= Clock Tower of Pristina =

Coordinates: 42°40′00″N 21°10′02″E

- Sahatkulla
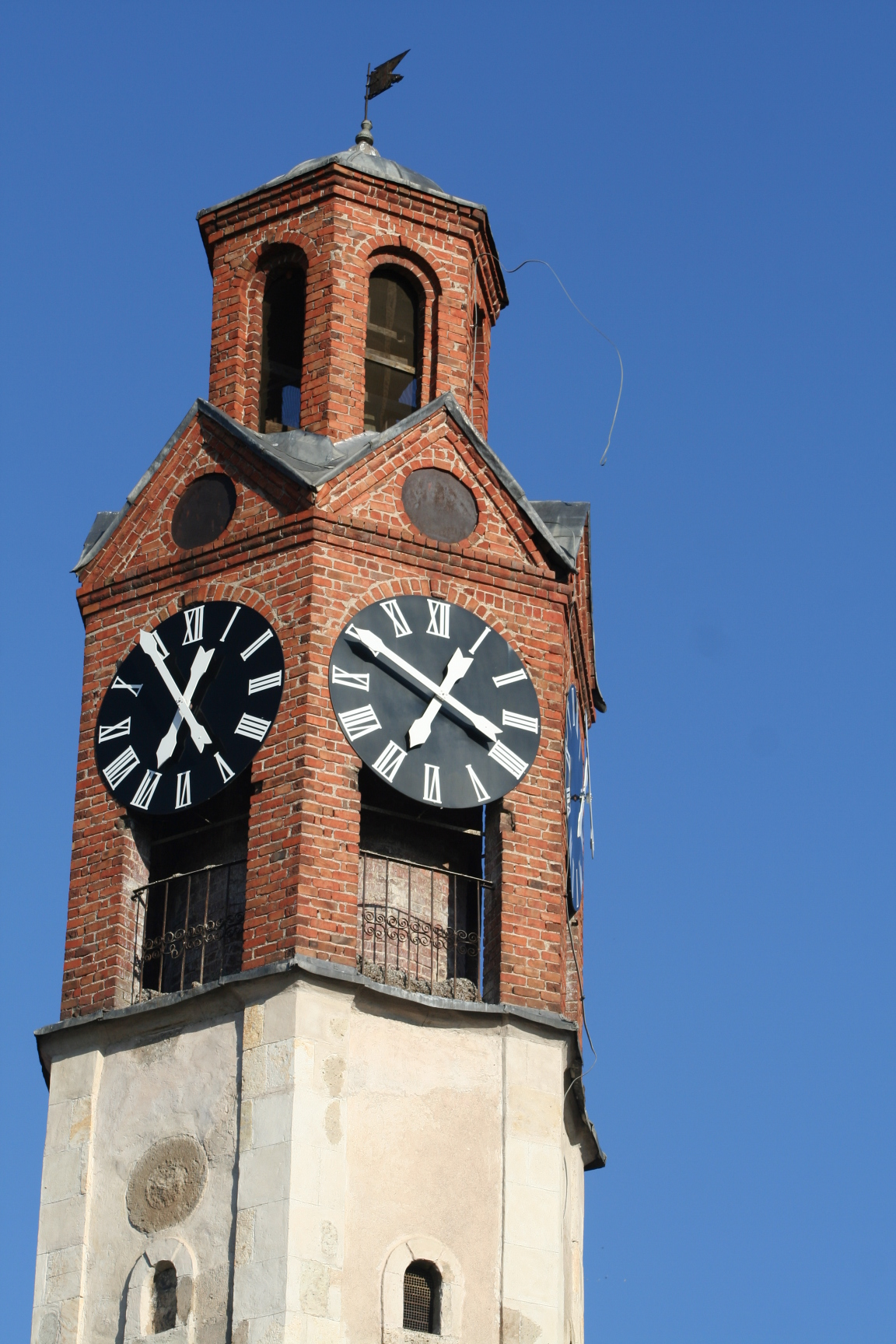
- View of the Clock Tower
- Interactive map of the Clock Tower of Pristina area

General information
- Type: Clock tower
- Architectural style: Ottoman
- Location: Pristina, Kosovo
- Completed: 19th century

Height
- Height: 26 meters

The Clock Tower (Albanian: Sahatkulla) in Pristina, Kosovo, was built in the 19th century by Jashar Pasha, after whom the Mosque is named not far from the Clock Tower. It served as a means of informing the town during the Ottoman Empire rule, in order to let people know when to pray as well as the traders closing their shops. The 26-meter high hexagonal clock tower was made of sandstone and bricks. The original tower was burned in fire and its bricks were used for reconstruction. The authentic bell was brought from Moldavia and has an inscription mentioning this fact. However, the circumstances of how the bell was brought to Pristina are not clearly known; its theft in 2001 is even more unclear. The same year, French KFOR troops assisted in installing a new clock by changing the old clock mechanism with an electric one.
