= Streetball Kosova =

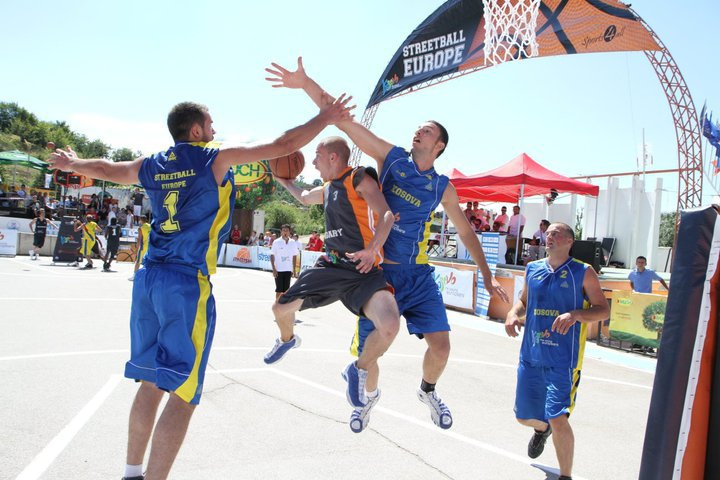
Streetballers at the Germia Park, basketball courts, Pristina, Kosovo

Streetball Kosova is a traditional streetball tournament held since 2000, organised in the amphitheatre of the swimming pool in Germia Park, Pristina, Kosovo. Streetball Kosova 2014 was the 15th edition in a row without any break.

== History ==
The interest for the games is large, hundreds of teams and thousands of players have participated. The teams are mixed and of different ages, and the games are viewed by a large number of people.

Streetball Kosova 2005 was the first tournament ever to be organised in the seven major cities of Kosovo.

Streetball Kosova 2006 was the first tournament ever to be organised in New York City, USA.

In 2009 Streetball Kosova participated for the first time in the Prague International Streetball Cup in the Czech Republic. Team Akull Kosova represented the Streetball Kosova in PIS 2010 and placed third.

Streetball Kosova 2012, held on 9–10 June, applied for the first time FIBA 3x3 rules. The tournament was divided in 3 competing categories; Senior Male, Senior Female and Junior's. Team Kujta won the tournament in the Senior class.

== Gallery ==
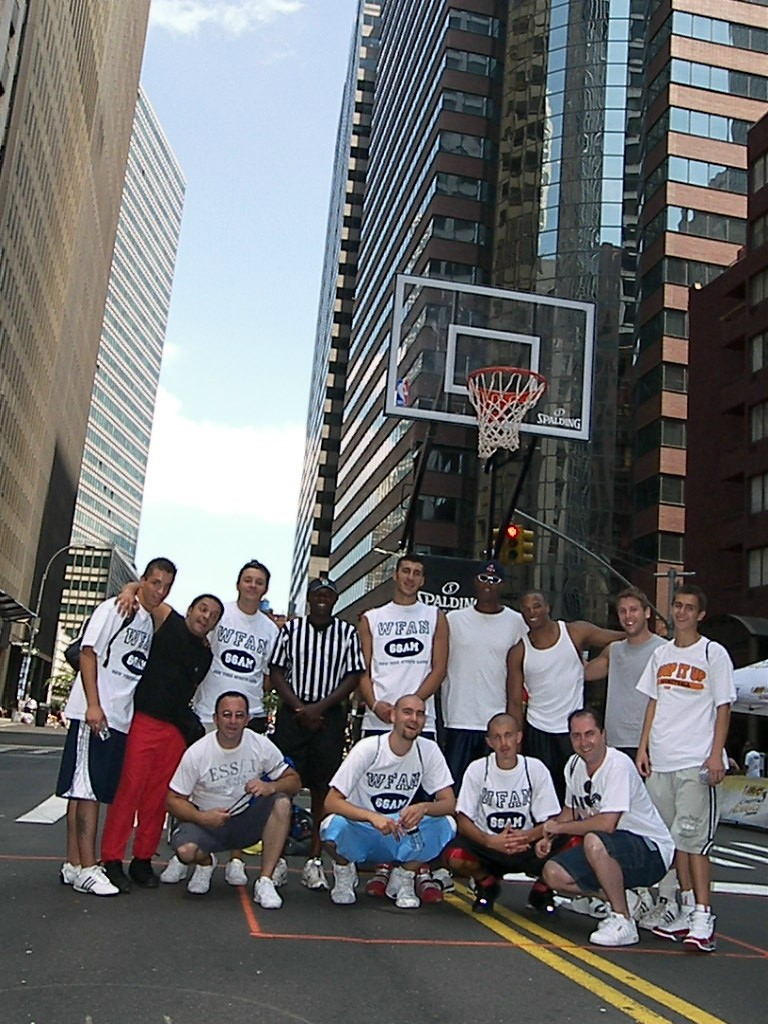
2006 Hoop It Up Championship. Kosova and USA teams

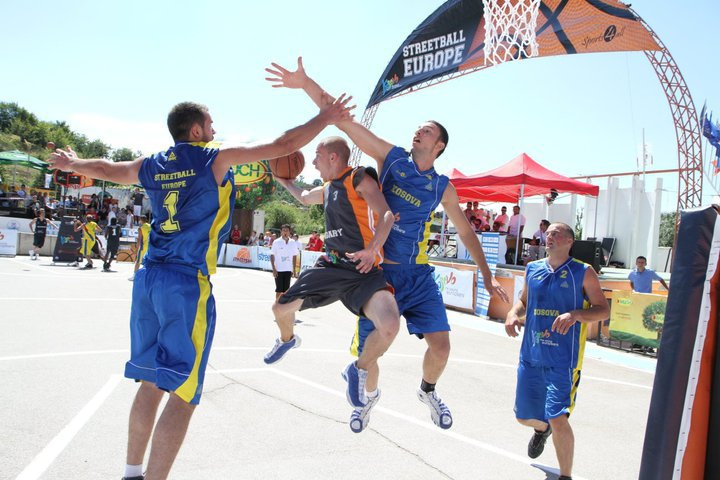
2010 Streetball Europe, Hungary vs Kosova

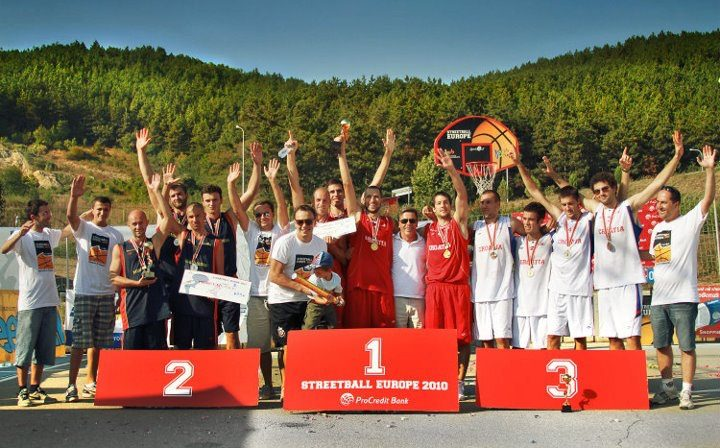
2011 Streetball Europe, Finalists
