= Pristina =

Capital and largest city of Kosovo

Pristina: Prishtina or Prishtinë (Albanian) Priština or Приштина (Serbian)
- Capital city and municipality
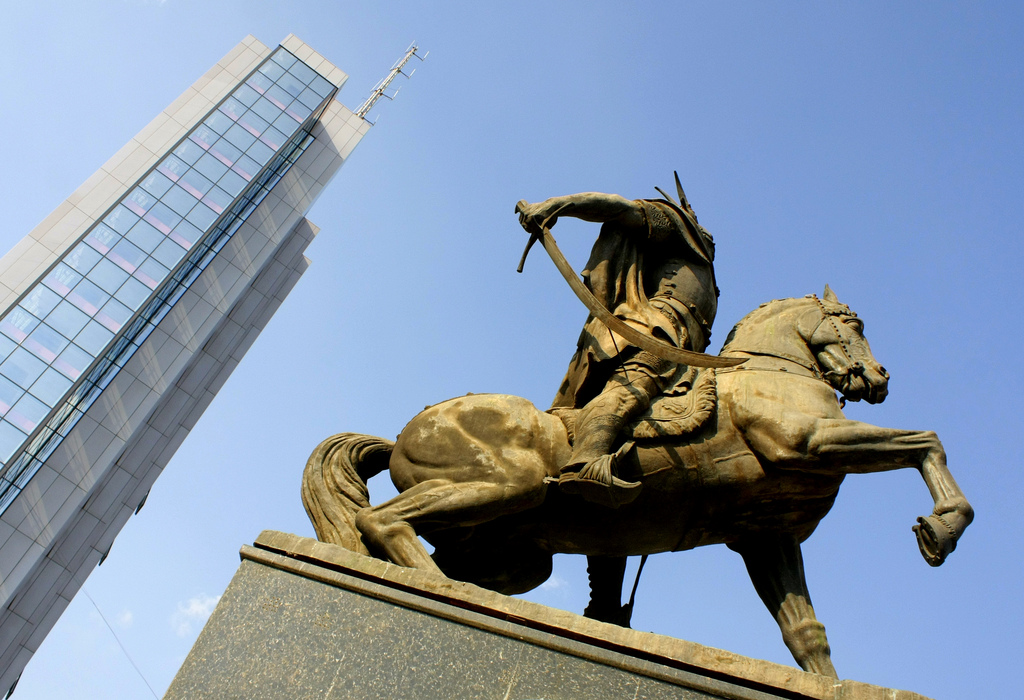
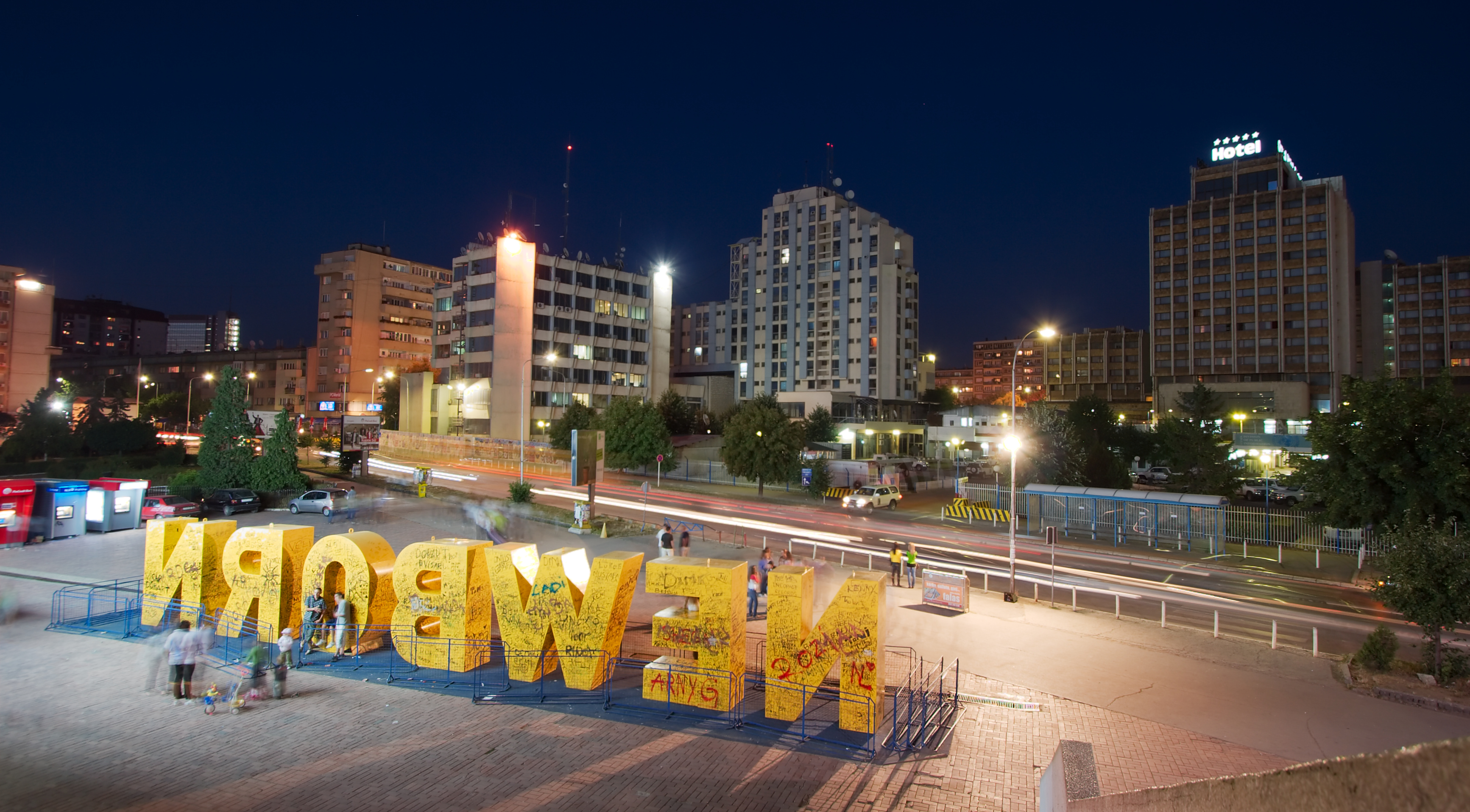
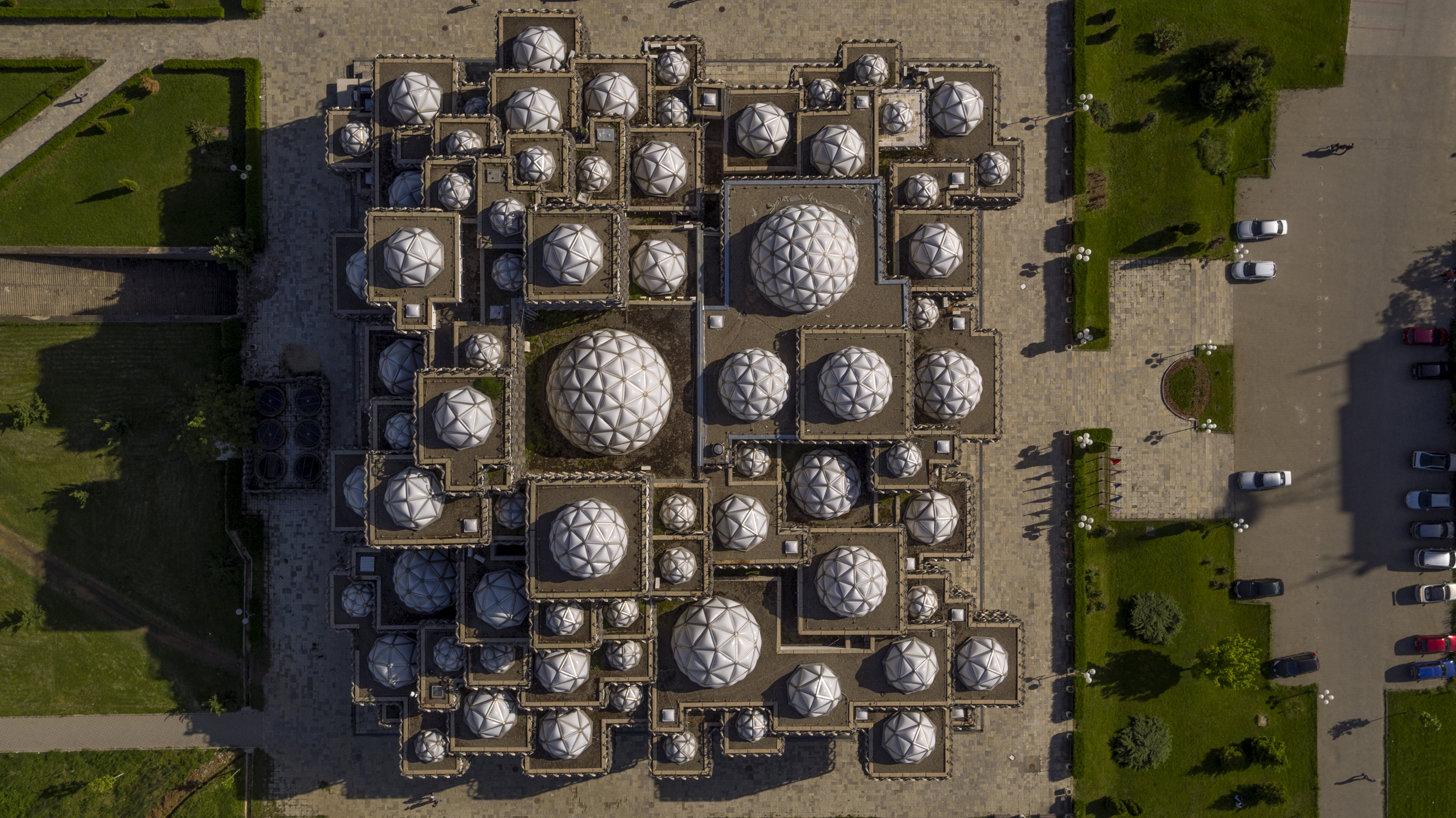
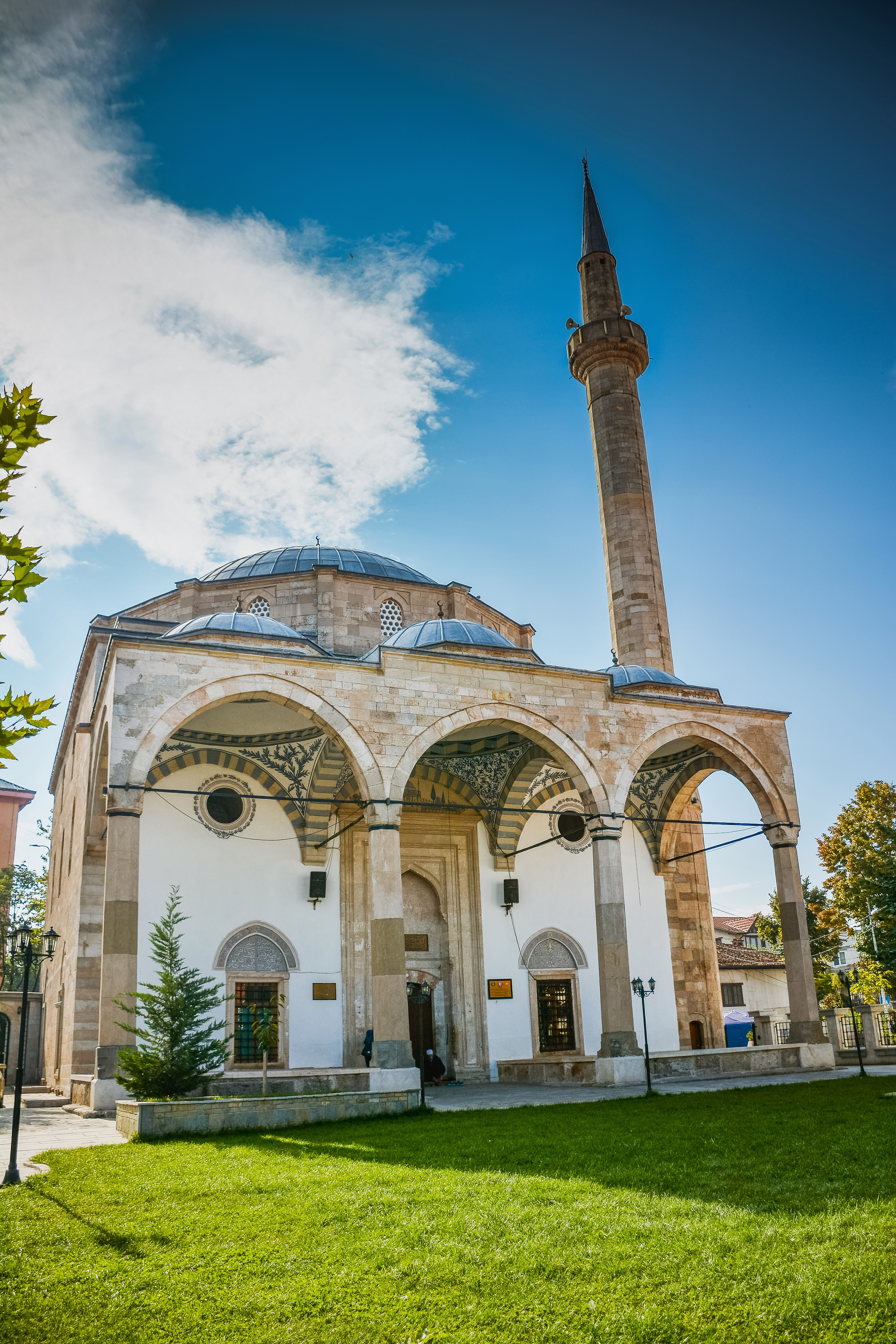
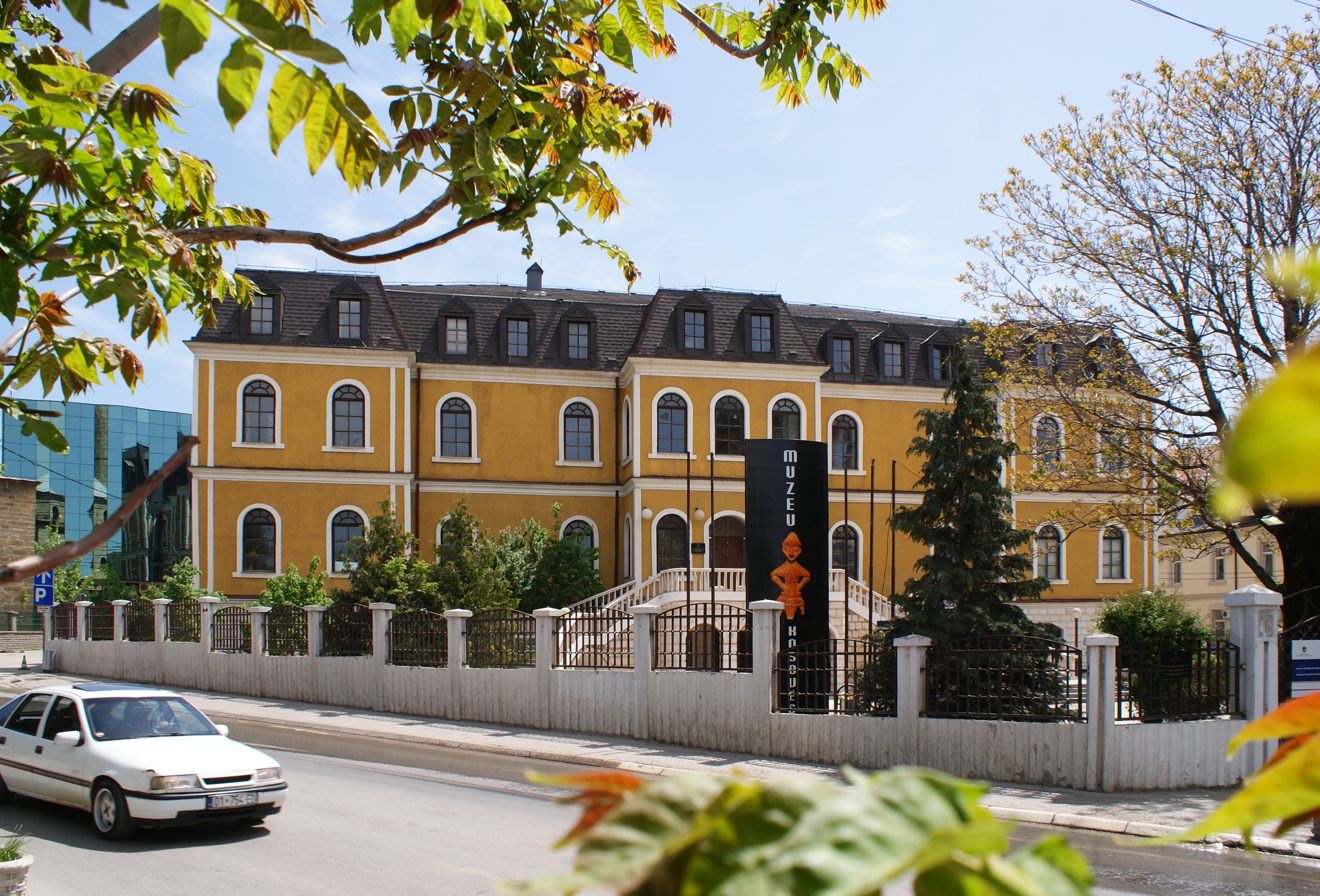
- Aerial view of Pristina overlooking the Cathedral of Saint Mother Teresa Skanderbeg Monument Newborn Monument National Library of Kosovo Palace of Youth and Sports Imperial Mosque Kosovo Museum

- Flag Seal
- Interactive map of Pristina
- Location of Pristina Pristina (Balkans) Pristina (Europe)
- Coordinates: 42°40′0″N 21°10′0″E
- Country: Kosovo
- District: District of Pristina
- Municipality: Pristina

Government
  - Type: Mayor–council
  - Mayor: Përparim Rama (LDK)
  - Council: Pristina Municipal Council

Area
  - Municipality: 523.13 km^{2} (201.98 sq mi)
  - Rank: 6th in Kosovo
- Elevation: 652 m (2,139 ft)

Population (2024)
  - Municipality: 227,466
  - Rank: 1st in Kosovo
  - Density: 434.82/km^{2} (1,126.2/sq mi)
  - Ethnicity: 98% Albanian; 2% Other
- Demonym(s): Albanian: Prishtinas (m), Prishtinase (f); Gheg Albanian: Prishtinali (m), Prishtinalike (f)
- Time zone: UTC+01:00 (CET)
  - Summer (DST): UTC+02:00 (CEST)
- Postal code: 10000
- Country code: +383 (0) 38
- Vehicle registration: 01
- Major airport: Adem Jashari Airport
- Website: kk.rks-gov.net/prishtine/

Pristina (or Prishtina (Note: Both names are officially used in English); UK: /ˈpriːʃtɪnə, prɪʃˈtiːnə/ PREE-shtin-ə, prish-TEE-nə, US: /ˈprɪʃtɪnə/ PRISHT-in-ə) (Note: Albanian: Prishtinë, pronounced [pɾiʃˈtinə], definite form: Prishtina, pronounced [pɾiʃˈtina]; Serbian: Приштина / Priština, pronounced [prǐʃtina]) is the capital and largest city of Kosovo. It is the administrative center of the eponymous municipality and district.

In antiquity, the area of Pristina was part of the Dardanian Kingdom. The heritage of the classical era is represented by the settlement of Ulpiana. After the Roman Empire was divided into a western and an eastern half, the area remained within the Byzantine Empire between the 5th and 9th centuries. In the middle of the 9th century, it was ceded to the First Bulgarian Empire, before falling again under Byzantine occupation in the early 11th century and then in the late 11th century to the Second Bulgarian Empire. The growing Kingdom of Serbia annexed the area in the 13th century and it remained under the Serbian Empire in the 14th century up to the start of the Ottoman era (1389–1455). City was capital of Serbian lord family of Branković. The next centuries would be characterized by Ottoman rule. During this period, Pristina developed from a village to a major urban center of the region. Following the end of the First Balkan War in 1914, it became a part of the newly formed Kingdom of Serbia. In 1948, it was chosen as the capital of the province SAP Kosovo under the statehood of Yugoslavia. Furthermore, Pristina would continue to serve as the capital of Kosovo after its 2008 independence from Serbia.

Pristina seems to have been a small village before the late 15th century. It is first recorded in 1342 as a village during the reign of Stefan Dušan; about a century later (and the beginning of the Ottoman era), in 1455, it had a small population of 300 households. In the following century, Pristina became an important mining and trading center due to its strategic position near the rich mining town of Novo Brdo. The city was known for its trade fairs and items, such as goatskin and goat hair as well as gunpowder.

Pristina is the capital and the economic, financial, political and trade center of Kosovo, due to its location in the center of the country. It is the seat of power of the Government of Kosovo, the residences for work of the President and Prime Minister of Kosovo, and the Parliament of Kosovo. Pristina is also the most important transportation junction of Kosovo for air, rail, and roads. Pristina International Airport is the largest airport in the country and among the largest in the region. A range of expressways and motorways, such as the R 6 and R 7, radiate out the city and connect it to Albania and North Macedonia. Pristina will host the 2030 Mediterranean Games.

== Etymology ==
The origin of the name of the city is unknown. Eric P. Hamp connected the word with an Indo-European derivative *pṛ-tu- (ford) + *stein (cognate to English stone) which in Proto-Albanian, spoken in the region before the reign of Roman Emperor Trajan (1st–2nd century CE) produced Pristina. Thus the name in the pre-Slavic migrations era would mean in the local Albanian variety "ford-stone" (compare Stanford).

Prišt in Serbo-Croatian means "boil" and this may be a reference to the seething waters of the nearby river Gračanka. Marko Snoj proposes the derivation from a Slavic form *Prišьčь, a possessive adjective from the personal name *Prišьkъ, (Note: Preserved in the Kajkavian surname Prišek, in the Old Polish personal name Parzyszek, and in the Polish surname Pryszczyk) and the derivational suffix -ina 'belonging to X and his kin'. The name is most likely a patronymic of the personal name *Prišь. (Note: Preserved as a surname in Sorbian Priš, and Polish Przybysz, a hypocoristic of the Slavic personal name Pribyslavъ) According to Aleksandar Loma, Snoj's etymology would presuppose a rare and relatively late word formation process. According to Loma, the name of the city could be derived from the Proto-Slavic dialectal word *pryščina, meaning "spring (of water)". (Note: Also attested in the Moravian dialects of Czech, derived from the verb *pryskati, meaning "to splash" or "to spray" (prskati in modern Serbian))

The inhabitants of this city, most of whom are Albanians, call themselves Prishtinali in the local Gheg Albanian.

== History ==
=== Early development ===
The area of Pristina has been inhabited since the Neolithic era by Early European Farmers after 7,000 BCE in the Balkans: Starčevo followed by its successors Vinča, Baden and lastly Bubanj-Hum. The earliest recognized references were discovered in Gračanica, Matiçan and Ulpiana.

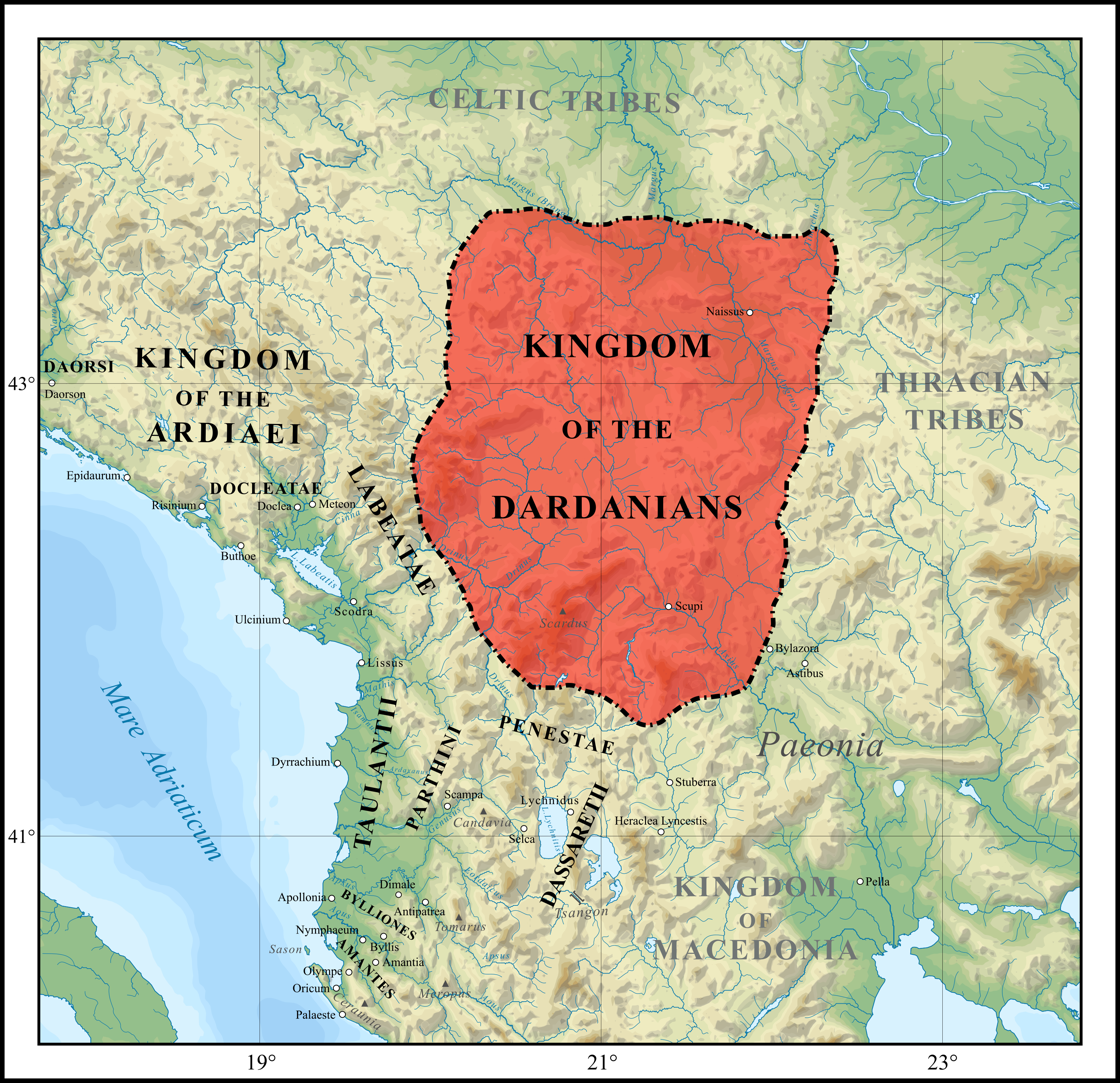
Kingdom of the Dardanians, late 3rd century BC

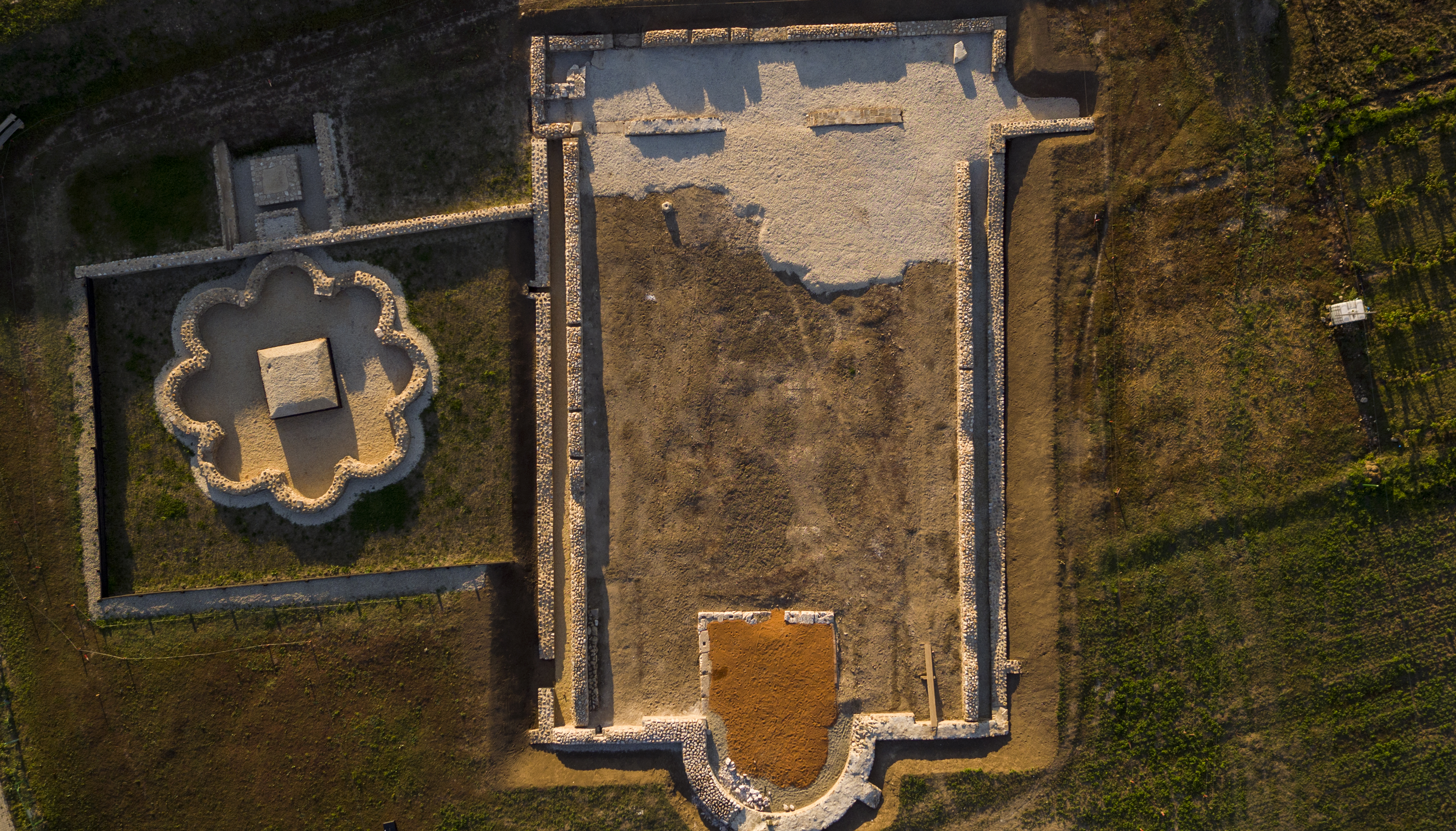
Ulpiana was an important political, cultural, and economic center of the Roman province of Dardania.

By the early Iron Age, the distinctly Dardanian local variant of the Illyrian Glasinac-Mati culture appears in Kosovo with a particular spread in hilltop settlements. In the area of Pristina, a hilltop settlement appears since the 8th century BCE at an elevation of 685 metres near the village Teneshdoll, around 16 kilometres north of the Pristina city center. Pottery finds suggests that the area may have been in use since the Bronze Age. The settlement seems to have maintained long-distance trade contacts as the finding of a skyphos vessel from Aegean Greece suggests. During the 4th century BC, the Kingdom of Dardania was established in the region.

Ulpiana was an important Roman city on the Balkan Peninsula and in the 2nd century BC it was declared a municipium. In the middle of the 9th century, it was ceded to the First Bulgarian Empire.

=== 11th to 16th centuries ===
In the early 11th century, Pristina fell under Byzantine Empire rule and the area was included into a theme (province) called Bulgaria. Between the late 11th and middle of the 12th century it was ceded several times to the Second Bulgarian Empire, before being annexed by the Kingdom (later Empire) of Serbia, which held it under its rule throughout the 13th and 14th centuries. In 1315, the nearby Gračanica monastery was founded by Serbian King Stefan Milutin. King Stefan Dušan used a location in the area of Pristina as his court before moving eventually to the vicinity of Skopje as he moved his rule southwards.

The first historical record mentioning Pristina by its name dates back to 1315–1318, in a chrysobull of Banjska near Mitrovica. A first brief description of it as a town was given a few years later by the Byzantine Emperor John VI Kantakouzenos, on his visit to Stefan Dušan at his royal court, describing Pristina as a 'unfortified village'. During the time of the Kingdom of Serbia in the early 14th century, the main route between the Western Balkans and Constantinople ran through Pristina. Following the Battle of Kosovo, Pristina fell within the realms of the Serbian Despotate under Prince Stefan Lazarević. A bitter feud between Lazarević and Đurađ Branković developed and led to open conflict, with Pristina being the scene of heavy fighting in 1409 and 1410. At the turn of the 15th century, during the time of the Serbian Despotate, Pristina was a major trading post for silver, with many traders hailing from the Republic of Ragusa.

Between the end of the 14th and the middle of the 15th century, Ottoman rule was gradually imposed in the town. In 1477 Pristina had a small Muslim population. The settlement at the time had about 300 households. About three-quarters were Christian and one-quarter were Muslim. In 1477 and 1525, Prishtina also had a Christian Albanian population. The 1487 defter recorded 412 Christian and 94 Muslim households in Pristina, which at the time was administratively part of the Sanjak of Viçitrina. By the late 16th century, 60% of the population in Pristina had converted to Islam. The Muslim households contained Muslim and Islamised Albanian names and the Christian ones Christian, Slavic and Albanian.

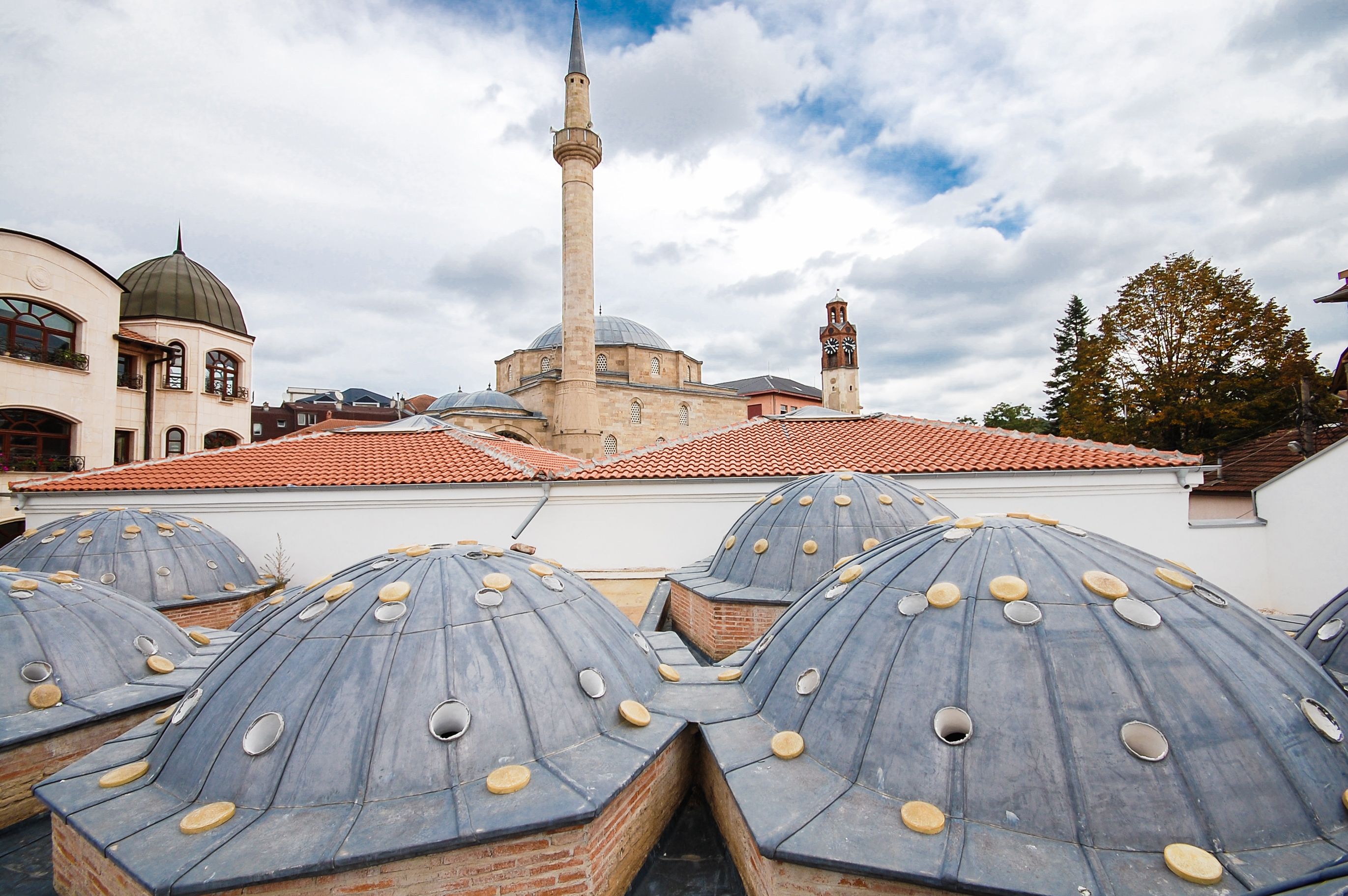
The Imperial Mosque was built by orders of Sultan Mehmed the Conqueror in the 15th century.

=== 17th to 19th centuries ===
During the Austro-Turkish War in the late 17th century, citizens of Pristina under the leadership of the Catholic Albanian priest Pjetër Bogdani pledged loyalty to the Austrian army and supplied troops. He contributed a force of 6,000 Albanian soldiers to the Austrian army which had arrived in Pristina. According to Noel Malcolm, the city in the 17th century was inhabited by a majority population of 15,000 Muslims, probably Albanian but very possibly including some Slavs. Sources from the 17th century mention the town as "situated in Albania". Austrian military archives from the years of 1689-90 mention "5,000 Muslim Albanians in Prishtina who had risen against the Turks". Gjergj Bogdani, a nephew of Pjetër Bogdani, wrote later: 'My uncle, being found already dead and buried, was dug up from his grave and put out as food for the dogs in the middle of Prishtina'.

During the 18th century, the history of the city is less documented, though recent data show a regular life unfolding in the city after the Great Turkish War. While in the first few decades the city was rebuilding its infrastructure, in the second part of the century it is better known for the governing of the local feudal family, the Gjinollis.

After the League of Prizren (1878), the Ottoman authorities moved the capital of the vilayet of Kosovo to Prishtina, likely to weaken the influence of the League of Prizren and to strengthen their control by placing the capital in a more central position of the vilayet. Prishtina remained the capital from 1879 to 1888. During this time, Prishtina saw major economic and cultural growth, recovering from decades of decline. The first registered state printing press was moved to the city, and key buildings like today's Kosovo Museum (completed in 1885) were built.

=== 20th century ===
In May 1901, Albanians pillaged and partially burned Pristina. The Kingdom of Serbia opposed the plan for a Greater Albania, preferring a partition of the European territory of the Ottoman Empire among the four Balkan allies. On 22 October 1912, Serb forces took Pristina. However, Bulgaria, dissatisfied with its share of the first Balkan War, occupied Kosovo in 1915 and took Pristina under Bulgarian occupation.

During the Massacres of Albanians in the Balkan Wars, Pristina suffered many atrocities; the Serbian army entered Pristina on 22 October. Albanian and Turkish households were looted and destroyed, and women and children were killed. A Danish journalist based in Skopje reported that the Serbian campaign in Pristina "had taken on the character of a horrific massacring of the Albanian population". An estimated 5,000 people in Pristina were murdered in the early days of the Serbian occupation. The events have been interpreted as an early attempt to change the region's demographics. Serbian settlers were brought into the city, and Serbian Prime Minister Nikola Pašić bought 491 hectares (1,214 acres) of land. Pristinans who wore a plis were targeted by the Serbian army; those who wore the Turkish fez were safe, and the price of a fez rose steeply.

In late October 1918, the 11th French colonial division took over Pristina and returned Pristina back to what then became the 'First Yugoslavia' on 1 December 1918. In September 1920, the decree of the colonization of the new southern lands' facilitated the takeover by Serb colonists of large Ottoman estates in Pristina and land seized from Albanians. From 1929 to 1941, Pristina was part of the Vardar Banovina of the Kingdom of Yugoslavia.

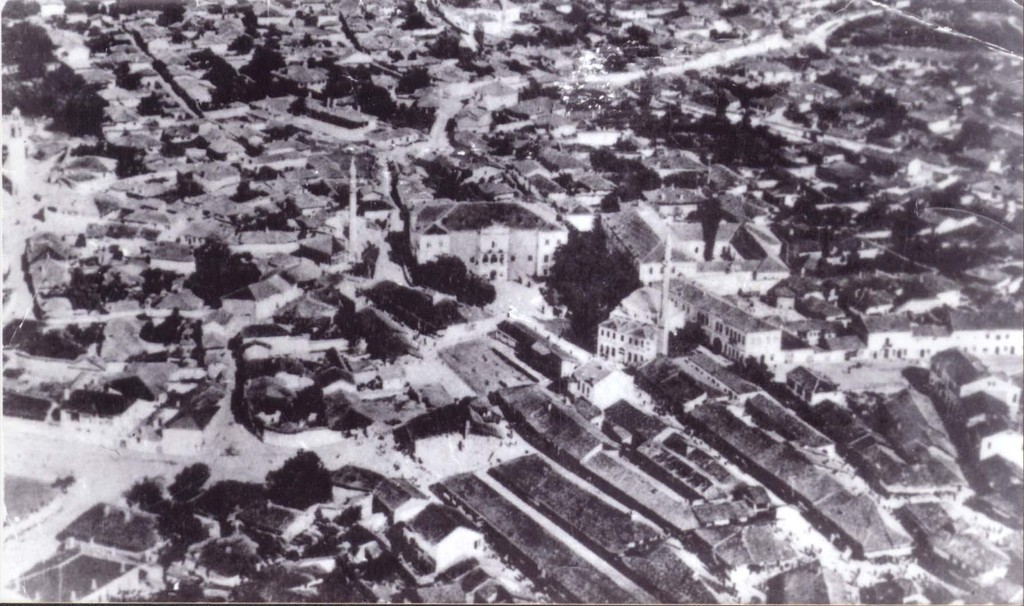
Aerial view of Prishtina in 1924

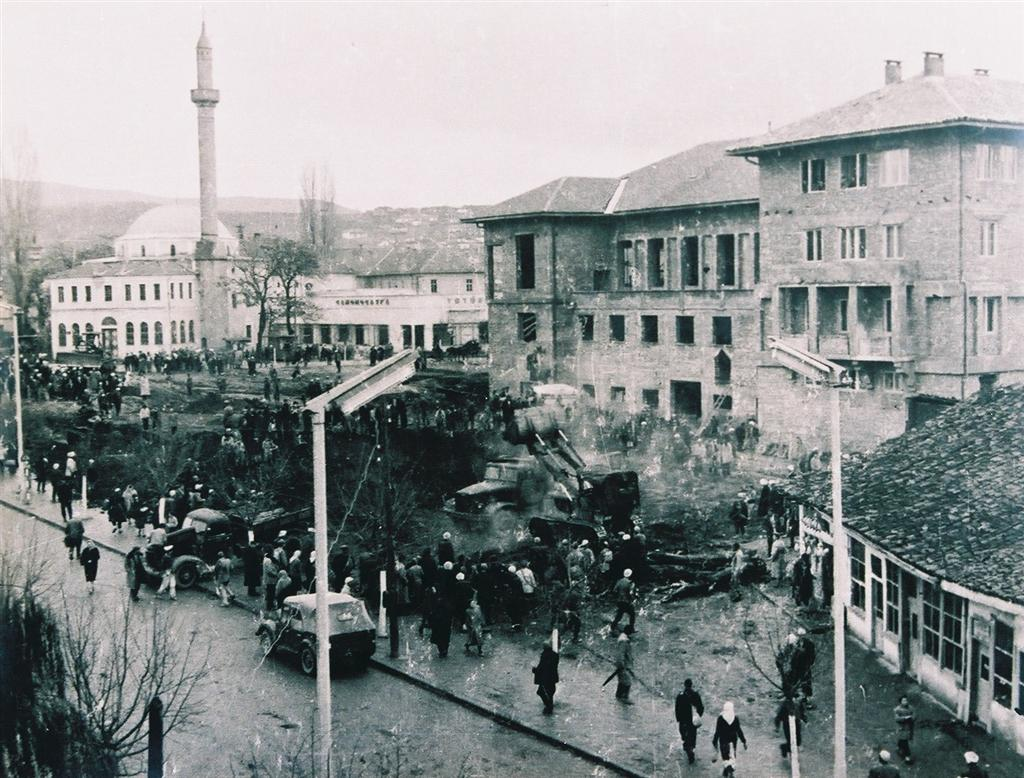
Destruction of Bazaar of Pristina after World War II

As part of Yugoslav colonisation of Kosovo, in an attempt by the Yugoslav government to change the ethnic composition of Kosovo, Prishtina was among the affected areas. During the period between the two World Wars, Serb colonist families were settled both in the city itself and across many villages, newly established settlements or within existing villages. These Serb settlers originated from Montenegro, Serbia, the Serb-inhabited regions of Bosnia and Herzegovina, and other regions where economic conditions were very difficult for them.

In city of Prishtina, around 70 Serb families were settled across various neighborhoods. Then the Serb settlers were also to be found in the villages of Badofci, Ballabani, Barilevë, Besia, Çagllavicë, Dabisheci, Gllogovica, Hajkobillë, Hajvalia, Keçekollë, Koliçi, Lebana, Makoci, Mareci, Bardhosh, Nisheci, Orlloviqi, Prapashticë, Slivova, Teneshdolli, Truda, and Vranidolli, with the number of families in each area ranging from 2 to 70. These settlers contributed to the demographic composition of the municipality in the past.

On 17 April 1941, Yugoslavia surrendered unconditionally to axis forces. On 29 June, Benito Mussolini proclaimed a greater Albania, with most of Kosovo under Italian occupation united with Albania. There ensued mass killings of Serbs, in particular colonists, and an exodus of tens of thousands of Serbs. After the capitulation of Italy, Nazi Germany took control of the city. In May 1944, 281 local Jews were arrested by units of the 21st Waffen Mountain Division of the SS Skanderbeg (1st Albanian). The Jews were later deported to Germany, where many were killed.

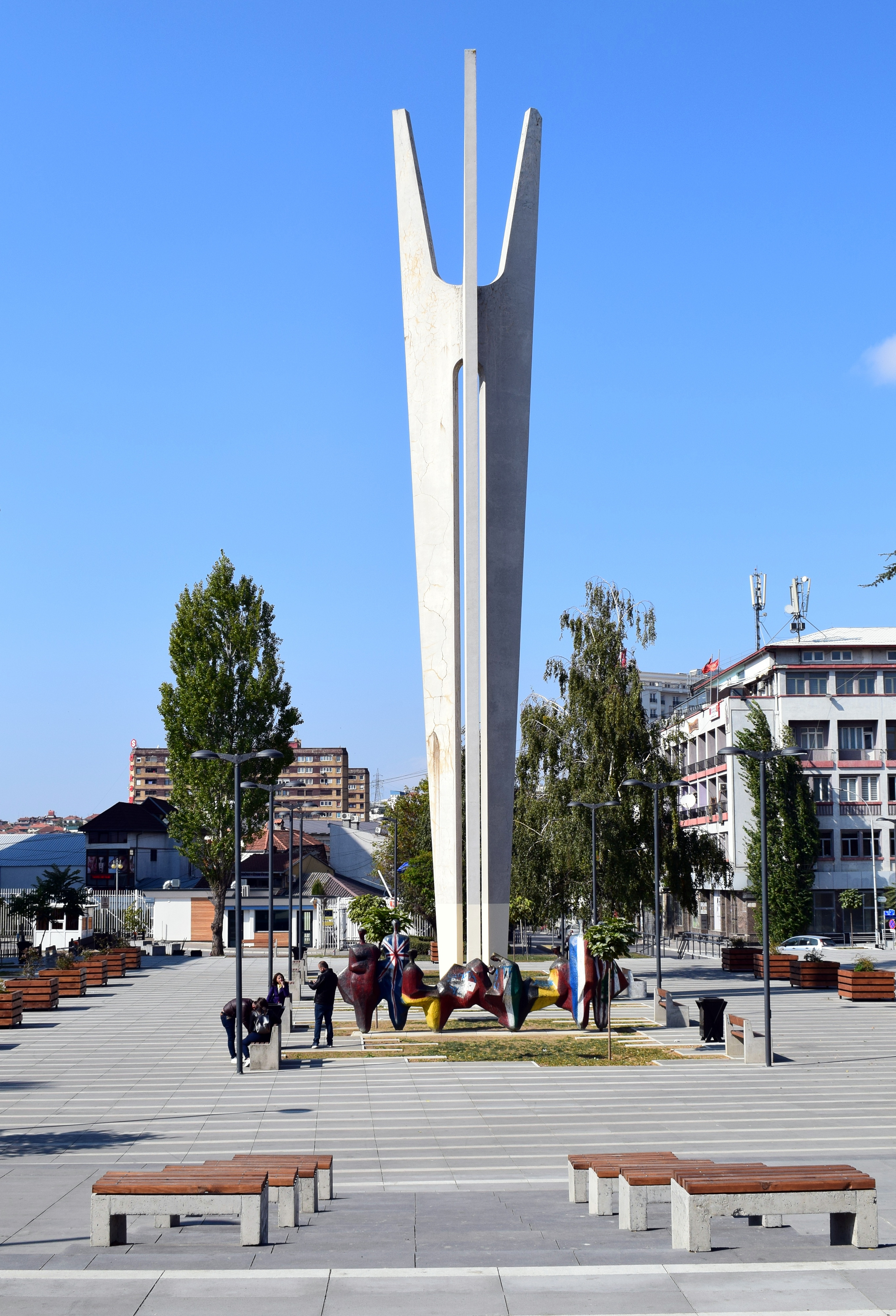
The Monument of Brotherhood and Unity by Miodrag Živković in the city center. "Brotherhood and unity" was a popular slogan of the Communist Party of Yugoslavia.

This ended a long period when the institution had been run as an outpost of Belgrade University and gave a major boost to Albanian-language education and culture in Kosovo. The Albanians were also allowed to use the Albanian flag.

==== Kosovo War ====
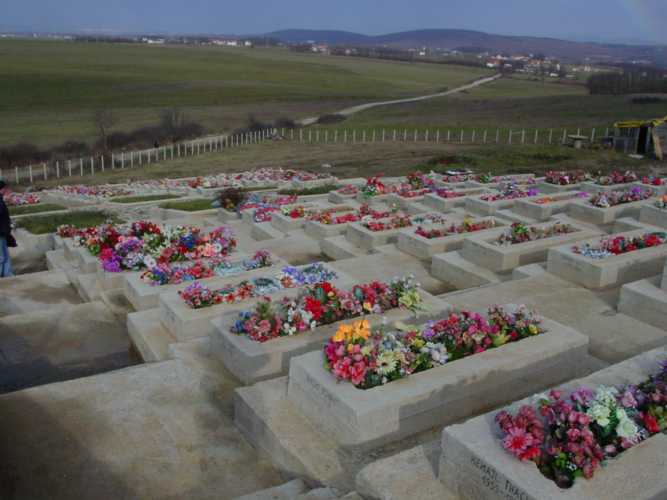
Graves of Albanian war victims south of Pristina

Following the reduction of Kosovo's autonomy by former Serbian President Slobodan Milošević in 1989, a harshly repressive regime was imposed throughout Kosovo by the Yugoslav government with Albanians largely being purged from state industries and institutions. The LDK's role meant, that when the Kosovo Liberation Army began to attack Serbian and Yugoslav forces from 1996 onwards, Pristina remained largely calm until the outbreak of the Kosovo War in March 1999. Pristina was spared large scale destruction compared to towns like Gjakova or Peja that suffered heavily at the hands of Serbian forces. For their strategic importance, however, a number of military targets were hit in Pristina during NATO's aerial campaign, including the post office, police headquarters and army barracks, today's Adem Jashari garrison on the road to Kosovo Polje.

Widespread violence broke out in Pristina. Serbian and Yugoslav forces shelled several districts and, in conjunction with paramilitaries, conducted large-scale expulsions of ethnic Albanians accompanied by widespread looting and destruction of Albanian properties. Many of those expelled were directed onto trains apparently brought to Pristina's main station for the express purpose of deporting them to the border of the Republic of Macedonia, where they were forced into exile.

The majority Albanian population fled Pristina in large numbers to escape Serb policy and paramilitary units. The first NATO troops to enter the city in early June 1999 were Norwegian special forces from FSK Forsvarets Spesialkommando and soldiers from the British Special Air Service 22 S.A.S, although to NATO's diplomatic embarrassment Russian troops arrived first at the airport. Apartments were occupied illegally and the Roma quarters behind the city park were torched. Several strategic targets in Pristina were attacked by NATO during the war, but serious physical damage appears to have largely been restricted to a few specific neighborhoods shelled by Yugoslav security forces. At the end of the war the Serbs became victims of violence committed by Kosovo Albanian extremists. On numerous occasions Serbs were killed by mobs of Kosovo Albanian extremists for merely speaking Serbian in public or being identified as a Serb. Violence reached its pinnacle in 2004 when Kosovo Albanian extremists were moving from apartment block to apartment block attacking and ransacking the residences of remaining Serbs. A majority of the city's 45,000 Serb inhabitants fled from Kosovo and today only several dozen remain in the city.

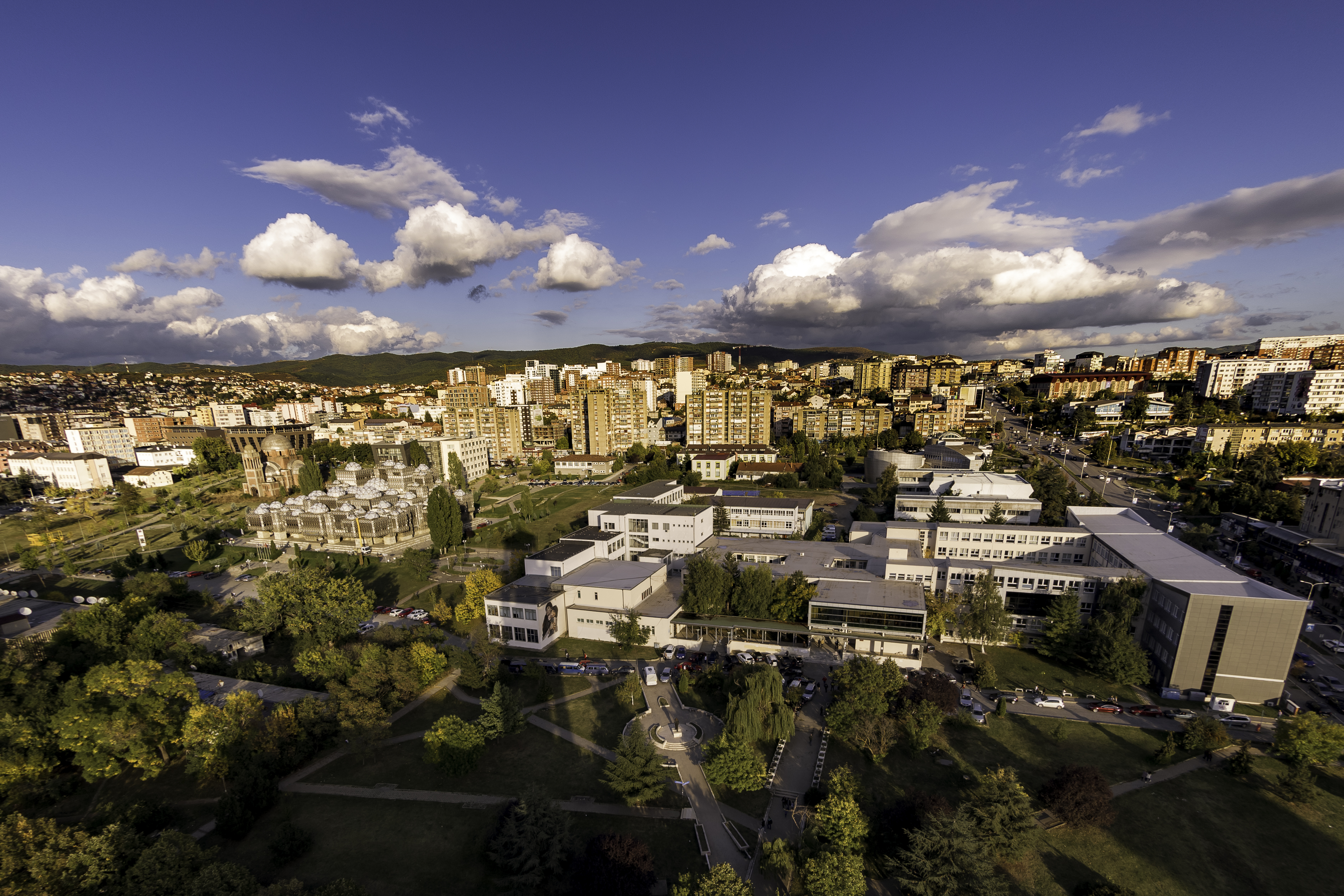
The city from the Cathedral of Saint Mother Teresa.

=== 21st century ===
Pristina International Airport's new terminal opened for operations in October 2013, which was built in response to a growing demand for air travel in Kosovo. In November of the same year, the R7 motorway as part of the Albania-Kosovo motorway, linking Pristina and the Albanian city of Durrës on the Albanian Adriatic Sea Coast, was completed. Another extensive development for the city has been the completion of the R6 motorway in 2019, connecting Pristina to North Macedonia's capital, Skopje.

Prishtina's post-1999 urban growth has also been the subject of academic study, including research that examines how university campuses interact with broader city planning and urban transformation within the frameworks of sustainable and resilient development.

== Geography ==
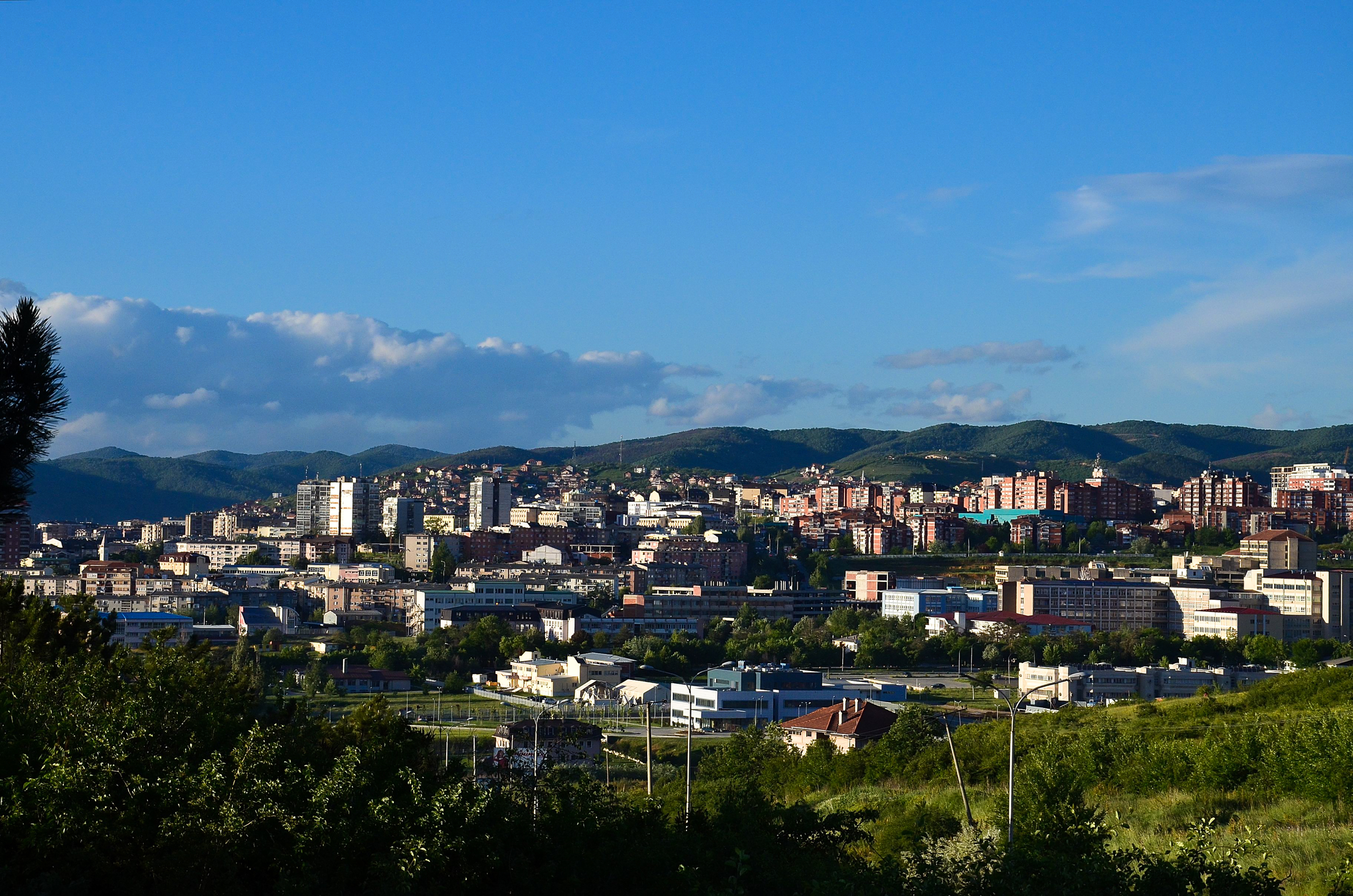
View of Pristina from the south.

Pristina is situated on an alluvial plain in the regions of Llap and Kosovo across the Gollak Hills in central and eastern Kosovo. Bodies of water in Pristina municipality include Badovc and Batllava lakes as well as the Llapi, Prishtevka, and Vellusha rivers. The park of Germia lies in the east of Pristina and extends in the north of the villages of Llukar and Kolovica to the south at Badovc.

Pristina is one of the urban areas with the most severe water shortages in Kosovo. Its population have to cope with daily water curbs due to the lack of rain and snowfall, which has left Pristina's water supplies in a dreadful condition. The water supply comes from the two main reservoirs of Batllava Lake and Lake Badovc. However, there are many problems with the water supply that comes from these two reservoirs which supply 92% of Pristina's population. As such, the authorities have increased their efforts to remedy the situation and to make sure that such crises do not hit the city again.

=== Climate ===
According to the Köppen climate classification, Pristina falls under the periphery of the humid continental climate (Dfb) zone bordering a hot-summer humid continental climate (Dfa) with an average annual temperature of 11.2 °C (52.2 °F). The warmest month in Pristina is July with an average temperature rising to 21.9 °C (71.4 °F), while the coldest month is January with an average temperature falling to −0.3 °C (31.5 °F). Pristina has a moderate climate with an average of 2043.6 hours of sunshine annually. July is the sunniest month of the year with an average of about 11.5 hours of sunshine a day and by contrast, the average hours of sunshine are less than 4.5 hours per day in January. The lowest temperature ever recorded in the city was −29.7 °C (−21.5 °F) on January 24, 1942, and the highest value of 41.2 °C (106.2 °F) on July 24, 2007.

Climate data for Pristina (Velania Station) 1991–2020 normals, extremes 1940–present
Month	Jan	Feb	Mar	Apr	May	Jun	Jul	Aug	Sep	Oct	Nov	Dec	Year
Record high °C (°F)	15.8 (60.4)	20.2 (68.4)	26.0 (78.8)	29.8 (85.6)	33.7 (92.7)	36.5 (97.7)	41.2 (106.2)	40.5 (104.9)	36.3 (97.3)	30.2 (86.4)	24.8 (76.6)	17.1 (62.8)	41.2 (106.2)
Mean daily maximum °C (°F)	3.8 (38.8)	6.4 (43.5)	11.7 (53.1)	17.2 (63.0)	22.1 (71.8)	26.2 (79.2)	28.8 (83.8)	29.1 (84.4)	23.9 (75.0)	17.8 (64.0)	10.6 (51.1)	4.8 (40.6)	16.9 (62.4)
Daily mean °C (°F)	−0.3 (31.5)	1.6 (34.9)	6.1 (43.0)	11.0 (51.8)	15.8 (60.4)	19.8 (67.6)	21.9 (71.4)	21.9 (71.4)	17.1 (62.8)	11.7 (53.1)	6.1 (43.0)	1.1 (34.0)	11.2 (52.2)
Mean daily minimum °C (°F)	−3.8 (25.2)	−2.4 (27.7)	1.2 (34.2)	5.2 (41.4)	9.6 (49.3)	13.2 (55.8)	14.9 (58.8)	14.7 (58.5)	10.8 (51.4)	6.5 (43.7)	2.1 (35.8)	−2.1 (28.2)	5.8 (42.4)
Record low °C (°F)	−29.7 (−21.5)	−25.5 (−13.9)	−19.0 (−2.2)	−6.8 (19.8)	−1.8 (28.8)	0.5 (32.9)	3.9 (39.0)	4.4 (39.9)	−4.0 (24.8)	−8.0 (17.6)	−17.6 (0.3)	−24.2 (−11.6)	−29.7 (−21.5)
Average precipitation mm (inches)	42.1 (1.66)	40.5 (1.59)	45.3 (1.78)	56.4 (2.22)	76.2 (3.00)	68.9 (2.71)	46.1 (1.81)	39.5 (1.56)	51.2 (2.02)	55.4 (2.18)	59.8 (2.35)	53.6 (2.11)	633.0 (24.92)
Average precipitation days (≥ 0.1 mm)	10.8	10.1	11.2	12.4	14.1	12.3	9.5	8.1	9.4	10.5	11.2	11.6	131.2
Average snowy days	10.2	8.3	6.2	1.5	0.0	0.0	0.0	0.0	0.0	0.5	3.4	8.1	38.2
Average relative humidity (%)	83.0	78.5	70.0	64.5	65.0	63.5	60.5	59.5	66.5	74.0	81.0	84.5	70.9
Mean monthly sunshine hours	71.3	96.0	145.7	174.0	223.2	252.0	297.6	285.2	207.0	145.7	87.0	58.9	2,043.6
Source: Republic Hydrometeorological Service of Serbia

== Demography ==
Historical population of the settlement of Pristina
Year	Pop.	±% p.a.
1948	19,631	—
1953	24,081	+4.17%
1961	38,593	+6.07%
1971	69,514	+6.06%
1981	108,083	+4.51%
1991	155,499	+3.70%
2011	145,149	−0.34%
2024	143,469	−0.09%
Source: Kosovo Agency of Statistics

Historical population of the municipality of Pristina
Year	Pop.	±% p.a.
1948	41,030	—
1953	47,985	+3.18%
1961	64,928	+3.85%
1971	99,140	+4.32%
1981	141,201	+3.60%
1991	191,501	+3.09%
2011	198,897	+0.19%
2024	227,466	+1.04%
Source: Kosovo Agency of Statistics

As per the 2024 census conducted by the Kosovo Agency of Statistics (KAS), Pristina is home to 227,466 residents, making it the most populous city and municipality in Kosovo. With a population density of 434 people per square kilometer, Pristina is the third most densely populated municipality of Kosovo. The population of Pristina grew by 14.2% between 2011 and 2024, which shows the rapid rate of urbanization in both the city and Kosovo as a whole.

=== Ethnicity ===
In terms of ethnicity, Albanians comprise 98% of Pristina's residents. The remaining 2% is made up of various minority groups, ranked as follows: 0.94% Turks, 0.34% Serbs, 0.22% Romani, 0.19% Ashkali, and 0.16% Bosniaks.

The Albanians of Pristina are Ghegs, an ethnic subgroup of Albanians, and they speak Gheg Albanian, a distinct dialect of the Albanian language.

=== Religion ===
In 2024, Pristina's religious composition was 91.46% Muslim, 1.02% Roman Catholic, 0.36% Orthodox, 0.14% other religions, 1.82% irreligious, and 4.19% preferred not to answer. Kosovo is a secular state with no state religion. The freedom of belief, conscience and religion is explicitly guaranteed in the Constitution of Kosovo. Islam is the most widely practiced religion among the people of Pristina, but the city has centers of worship for a multitude of faiths for its population.

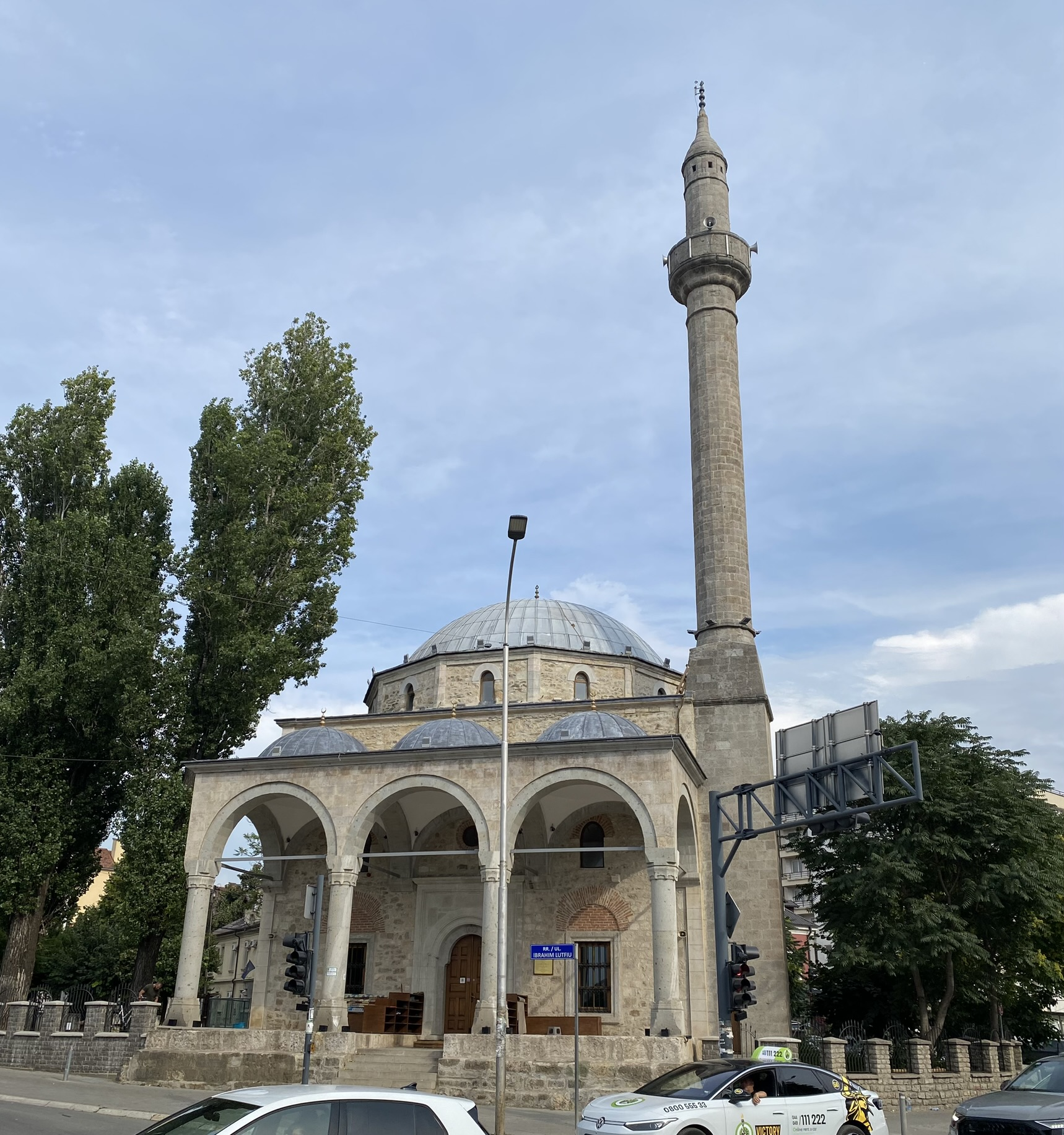
The Çarshi Mosque stands as the oldest building in Pristina

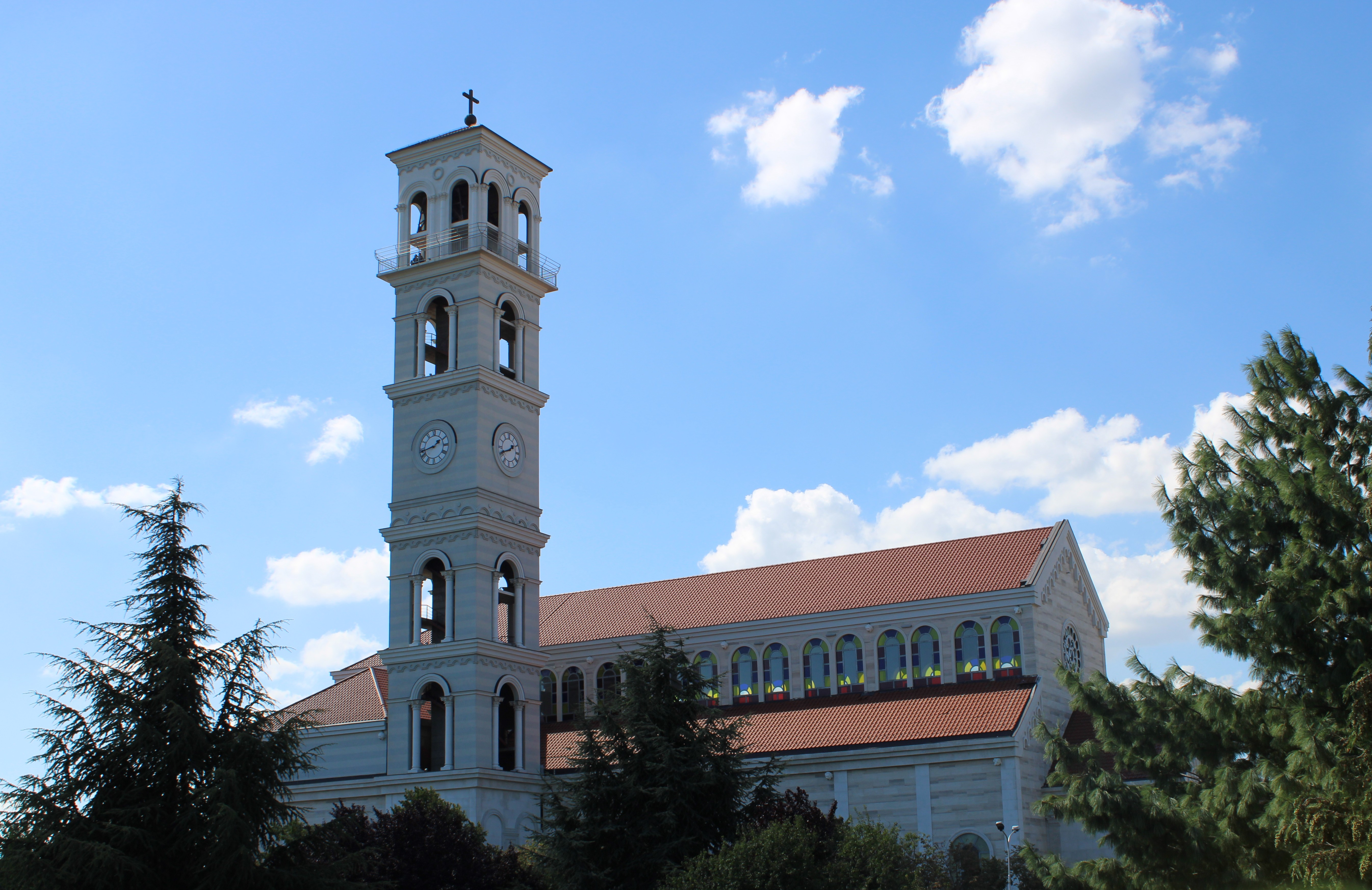
The Cathedral of Saint Mother Teresa is a Roman Catholic cathedral dedicated to Mother Teresa

== Politics ==
Pristina is the capital city of Kosovo and plays an instrumental role in shaping the political and economic life of the country. It is the location of the Parliament of Kosovo (which is headquartered at the Mother Teresa Square); Pristina is also the official residence and workplace of the President and Prime Minister of Kosovo. Pristina is also home to Kosovo's Constitutional Court, Supreme Court and Appeal Court as well as the Basic Court of Pristina.

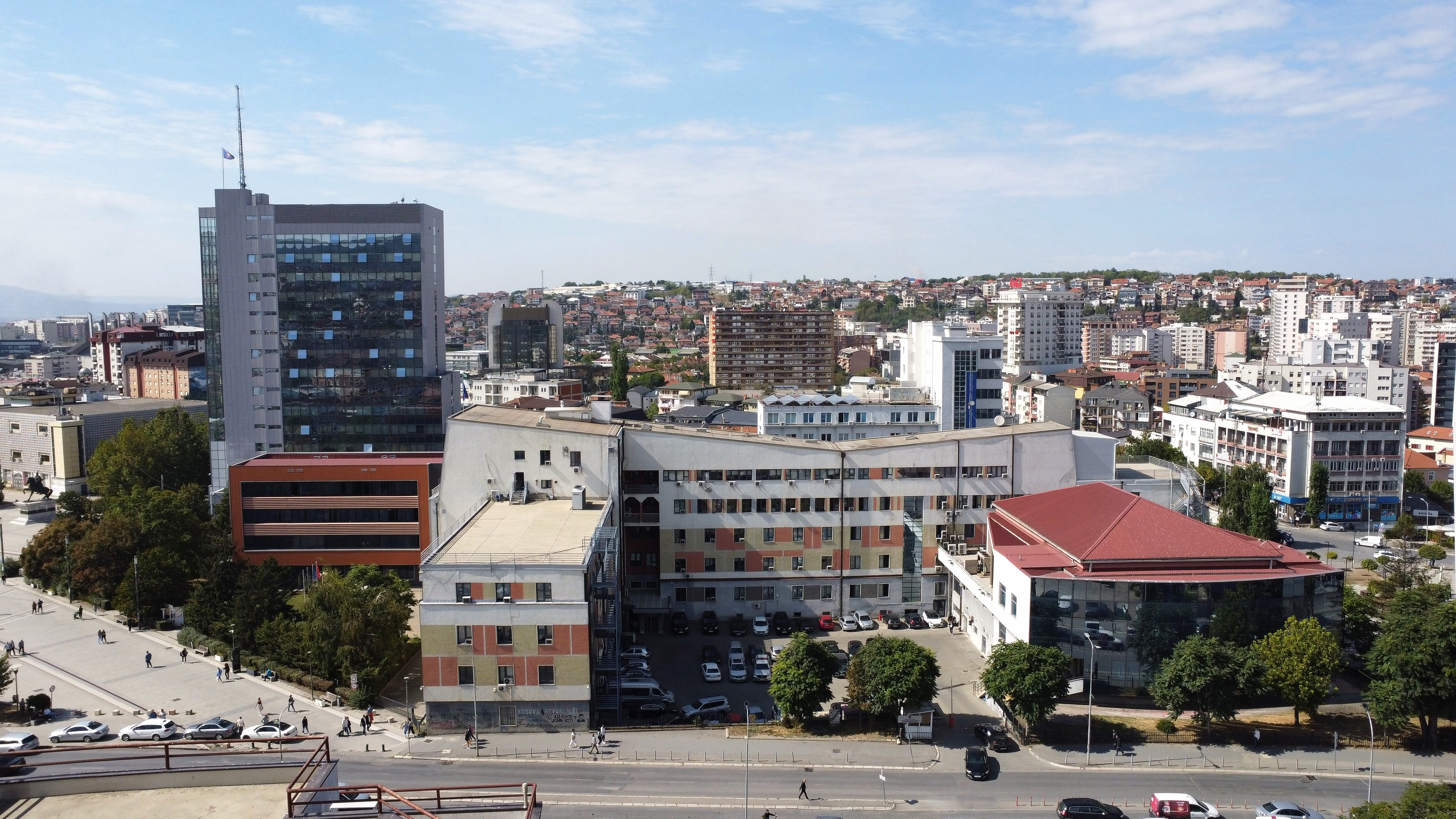
Kosovo's Assembly and government buildings

Pristina is a municipality governed by a mayor–council system with the mayor of Pristina and the members of the Pristina municipal council responsible for the administration of Pristina municipality. The municipality is encompassed in Pristina district and consists of 43 adjacent settlements with Pristina as its seat. The mayor of Pristina is elected by the people to act as the chief executive officer of Pristina municipality. The Pristina municipal council is the legislative arm of the municipality and is also a democratically elected institution, comprising 51 councilors since the latest municipal election.

== Economy ==
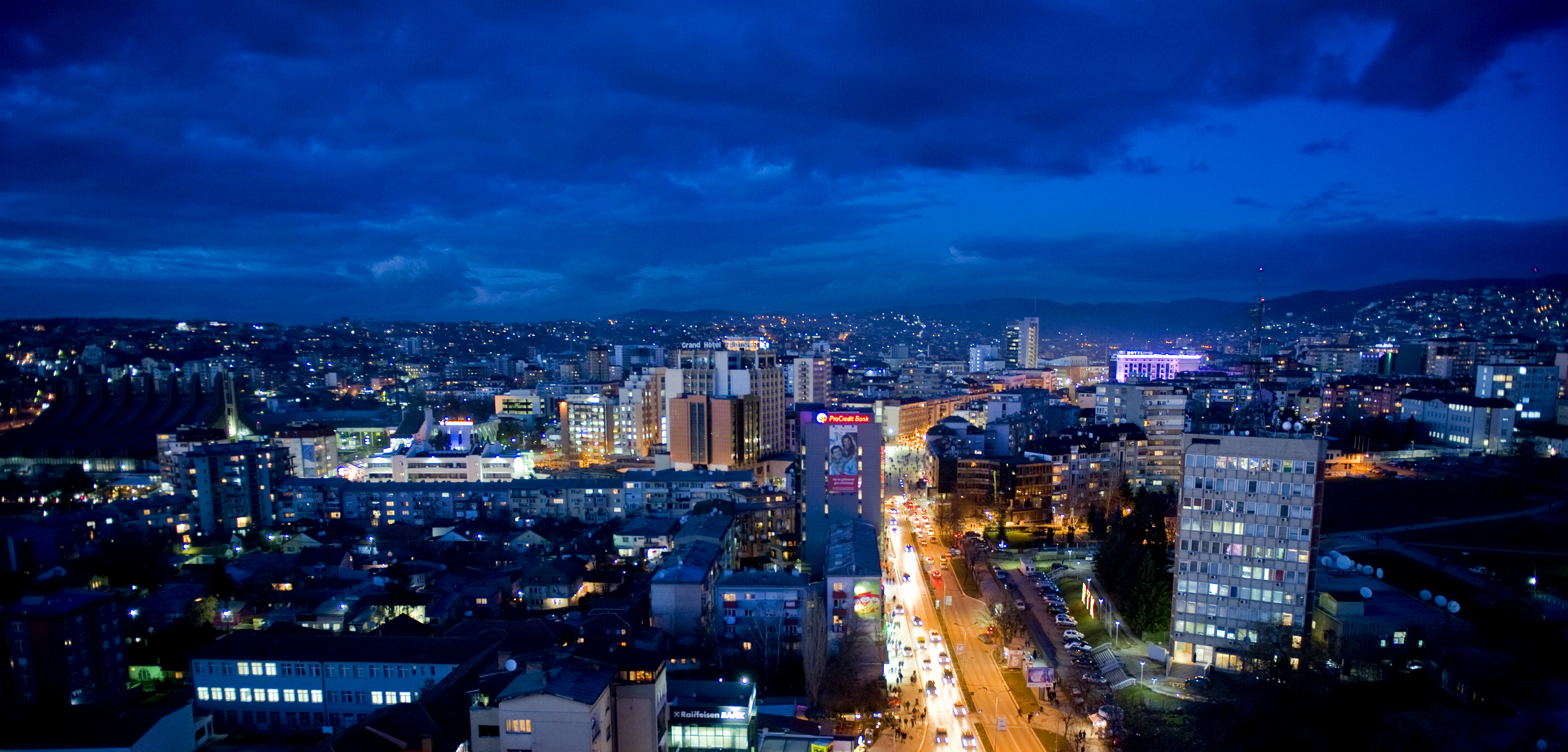
Pristina is home to the largest companies of Kosovo.

Pristina constitutes the heart of the economy of Kosovo and of vital importance to the country's stability. The tertiary sector is the most important for the economy of the city and employs more than 75% of workforce of Pristina. 20% of the working population makes up the secondary sector followed by the primary sector with only 5%.

Pristina is the primary tourist destination in Kosovo as well as the main air gateway to the country. It is known as a university center of students from neighboring countries as Albania, North Macedonia, Montenegro and Serbia. In 2012, tourism in Pristina attracted around 100,000 foreign visitors. which represents 74.2%. Most foreign tourists come from Albania, Turkey, Germany, United States, Slovenia, Montenegro, North Macedonia, with the number of visitors from elsewhere growing every year.

The city has a large number of luxury hotels, modern restaurants, bars, pubs and very large nightclubs. Coffee bars are a representative icon of Pristina and they can be found almost everywhere. The largest hotels of the city are the Swiss Diamond and the Grand Hotel Prishtina situated in the heart of the city. Other major hotels present in Pristina include the Emerald Hotel, Sirius Hotel and Hotel Garden.

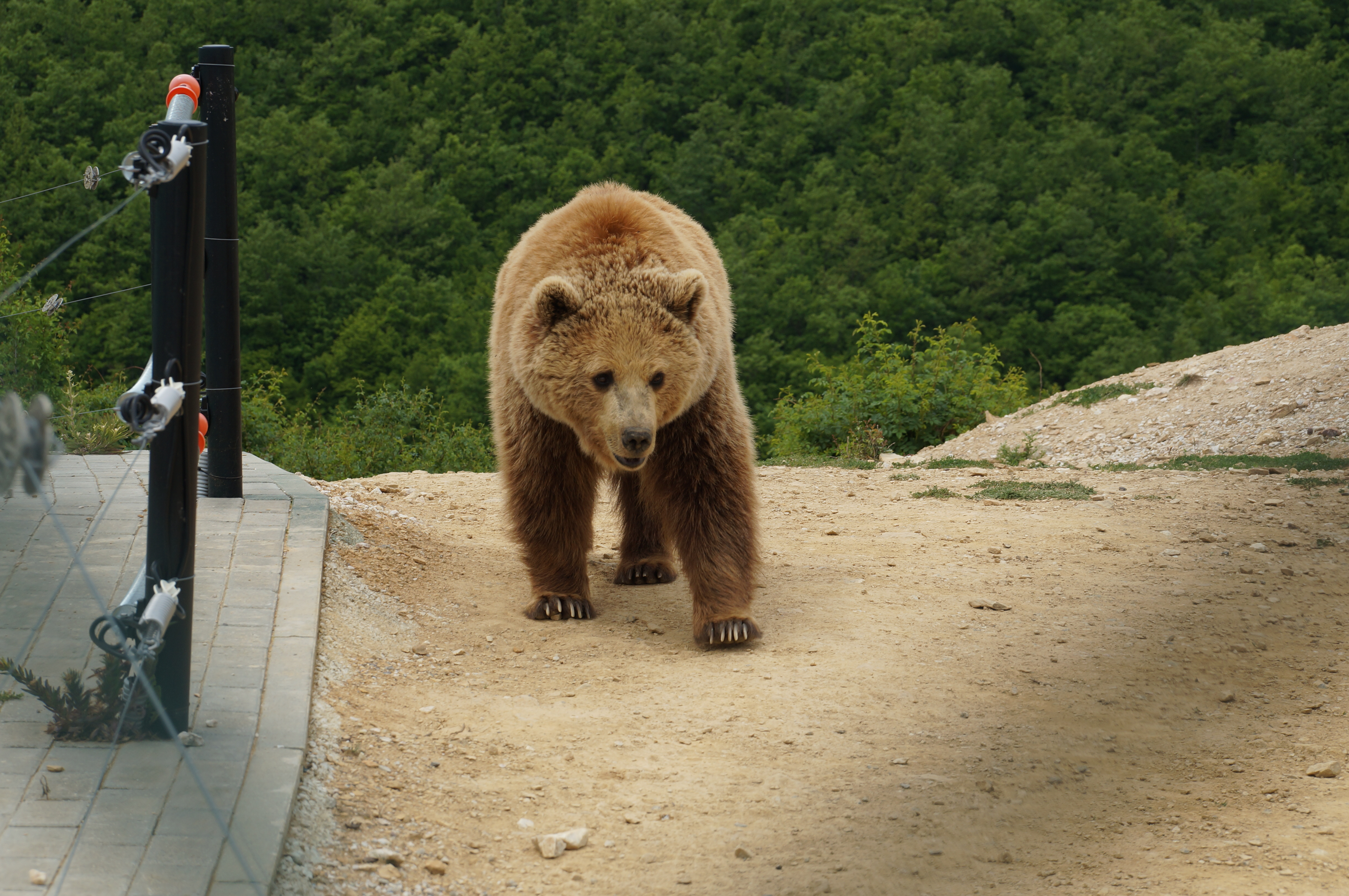
One of the bears of Bear Sanctuary Prishtina

Some of the most visited sights near the city include Batllava Lake and Marble Cave, which are also among the most visited places in country. Pristina has played a very important role during the World War II, being a shelter for Jews, whose cemeteries now can be visited. There is also a bear sanctuary located around 22 km (14 mi) away from Pristina in the direction of Gjilan that is a tourist destination for local and foreign tourists.

== Education ==
National Library of Kosovo

Pristina is the center of education in the country and home to many public and private primary and secondary schools, colleges, academies and universities, located in different areas across the city. The University of Pristina is the largest and oldest university of the city and was established in the 20th century.

Finance, arts, journalism, medicine, dentistry, pharmaceuticals, veterinary programs, and engineering are among the most popular fields for foreigners to undertake in the city. This brings a many of young students from other cities and countries to Pristina. It is known for its many educational institutions such as University of Pristina, University of Pristina Faculty of Arts and the Academy of Sciences and Arts of Kosovo, and AAB College.

Among the first schools known in the city were those opened during the Ottoman period. Albanians were allowed to attend these schools, most of which were religious, with only few of them being secular.

The city has numerous libraries, many of which contain vast collections of historic and cultural documents. The most important library in terms of historic document collections is the National Library of Kosovo.

== Culture ==
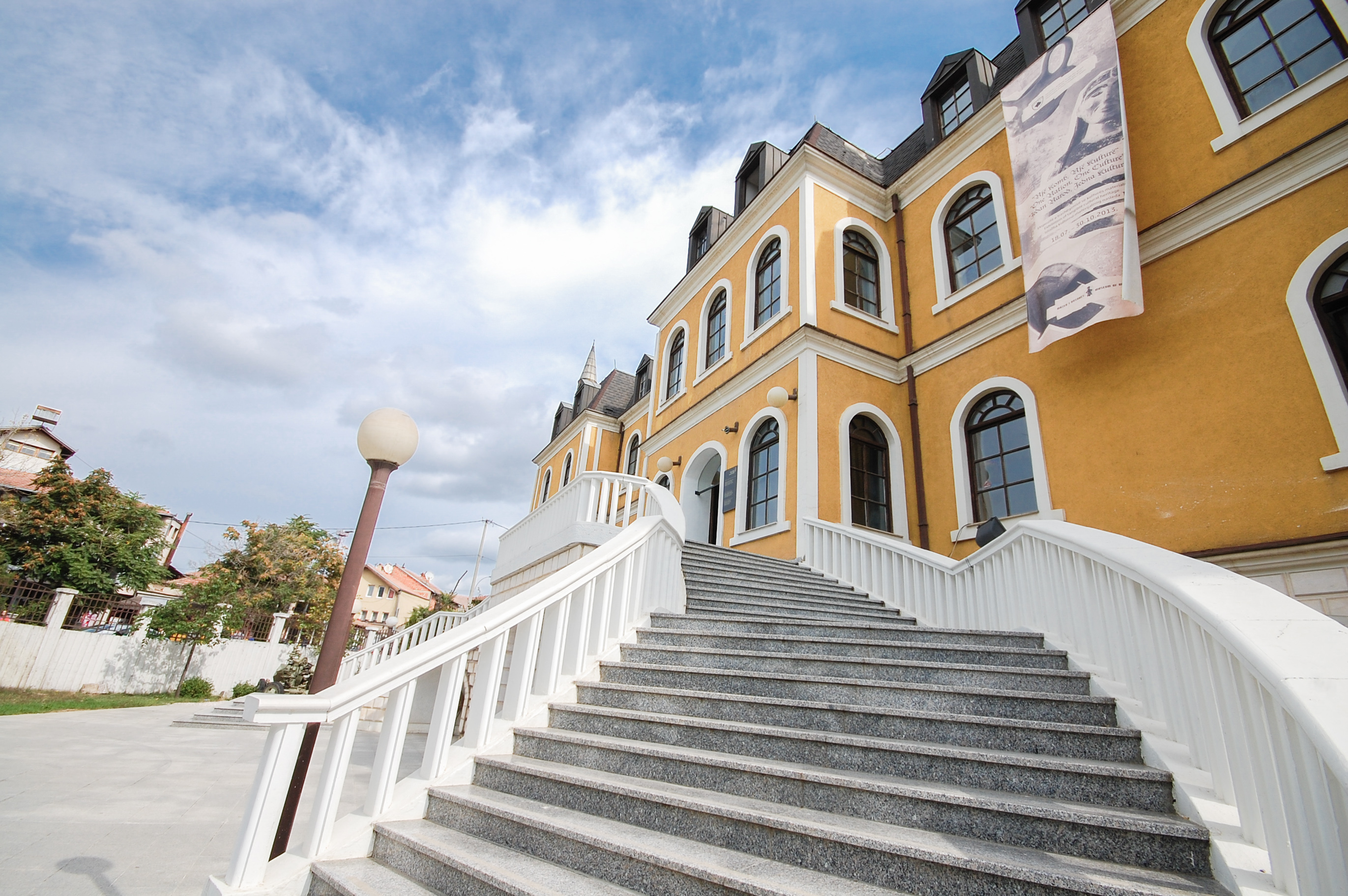
The Kosovo Museum is the earliest institution of cultural heritage in Kosovo.

Pristina is home to the largest cultural institutions of the country, such as the National Theatre of Kosovo, National Archaeology, Ethnography and Natural science Museum, National Art Gallery and the Ethnological Museum. The National Library of Kosovo has more than 1.8 million books, periodicals, maps, atlases, microfilms and other library materials.

There are many foreign cultural institutions in Pristina, including the Albanian Albanological Institute, the French Alliance Française, the British Council, and the German Goethe-Institut and Friedrich Ebert Foundation. The Information Office of the Council of Europe was also established in Pristina.

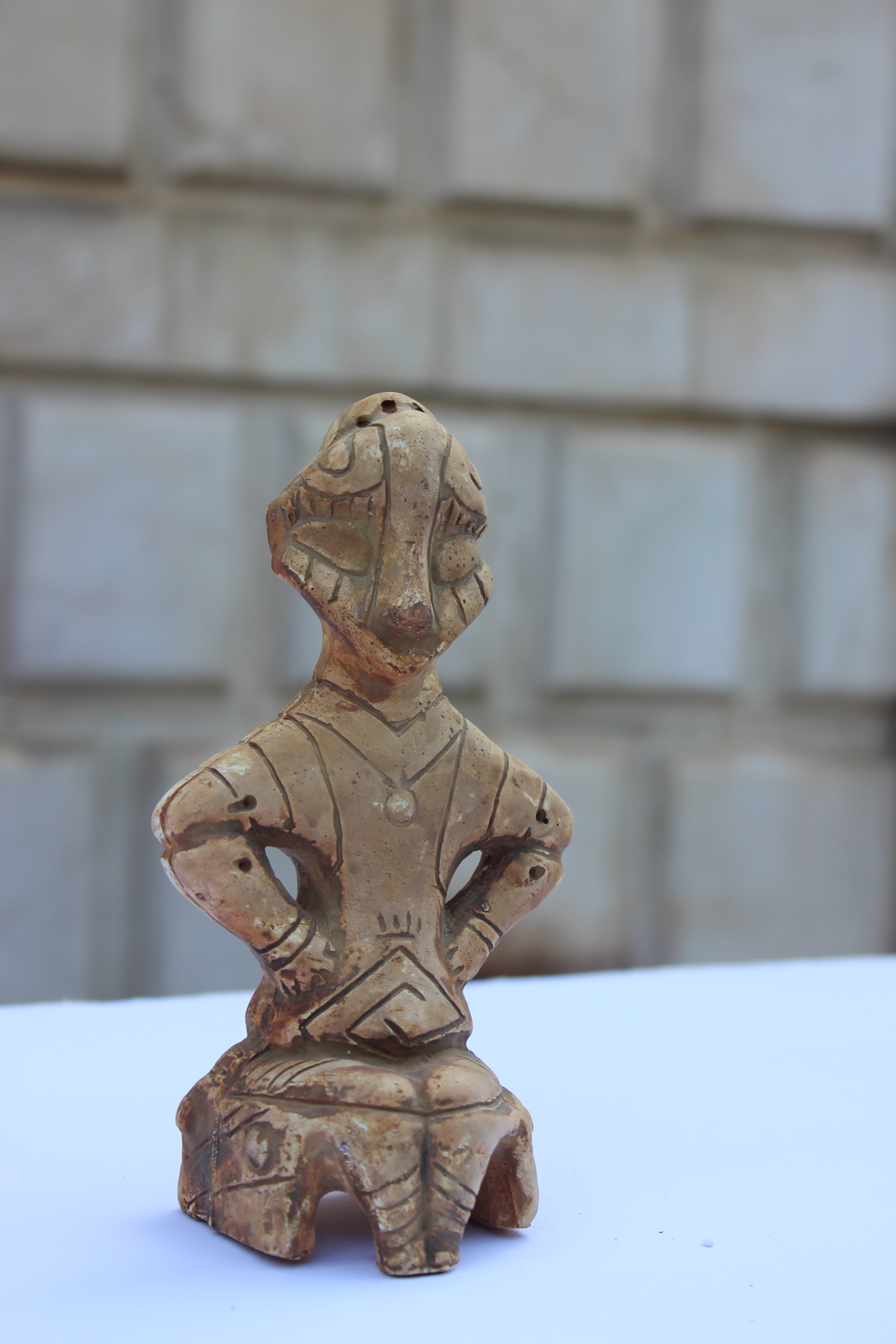
The Goddess on the Throne is one of the most precious archaeological artifacts of the country and has been adopted as the symbol of Pristina.

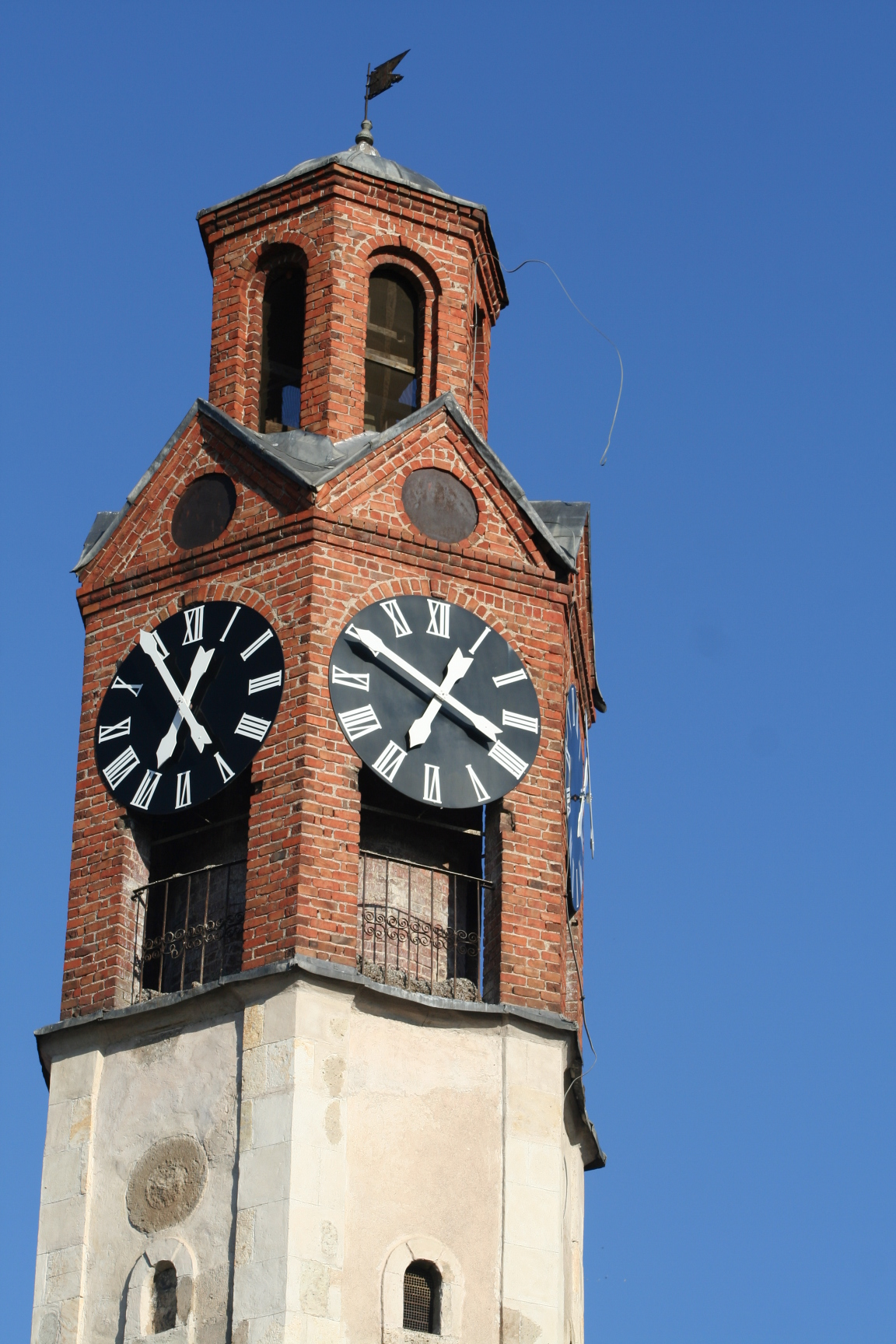
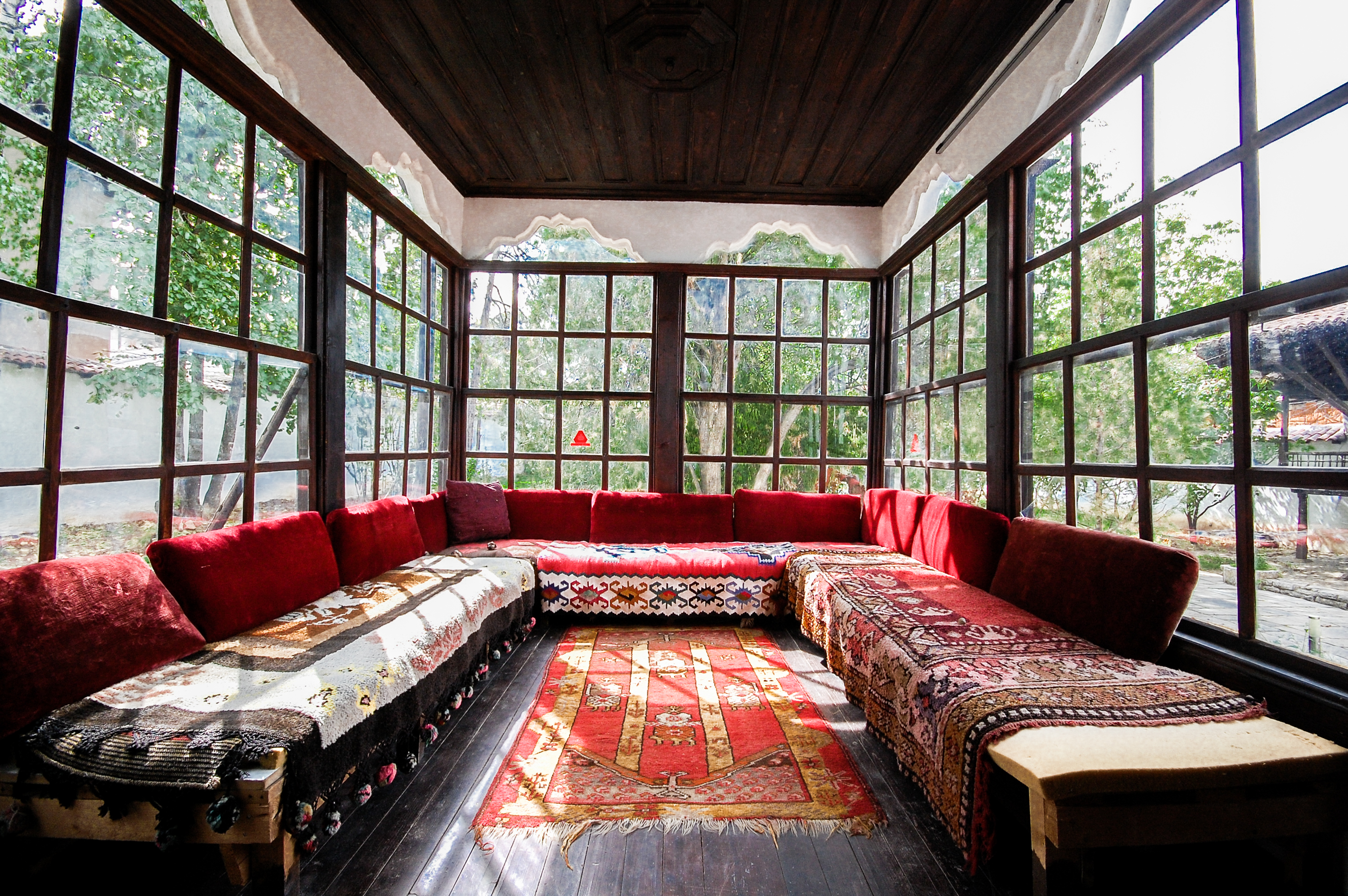
The Clock Tower served as a means of informing the town in order to let people know when to pray as well as the traders closing their shops. (left) The Ethnological Museum. (right)

Of 426 protected historical monuments in Kosovo, 21 are in Pristina. A large number of these monuments date back to the Byzantine and Ottoman periods.

Starting in 1945, the Yugoslav authorities began constructing a modern Pristina with the idea of "destroy the old, build the new". This modernization led to major changes in the structure of the buildings, their function and their surrounding environment.

However, numerous types of monuments have been preserved, including four mosques, a restored orthodox church, an Ottoman bath, a public fountain, a clock tower, several traditional houses as well as European-influenced architecture buildings such as the Kosovo Museum. These symbolize the historical and cultural character of Pristina as it was developed throughout centuries in the spirit of conquering empires (Roman, Byzantine, Ottoman and Austro-Hungarian).

The Hivzi Sylejmani Library was founded in 1945 and it is one of the largest libraries regarding the number of books in its inventory which is nearly 100.000. All of those books are in service for the library's registered readers.

The Mbretëresha e Dardanisë (Queen of Dardania) or Hyjnesha ne Fron (The Goddess on the Throne) is an artifact that was found during some excavations in 1955 in the area of Ulpiana, a suburb of Pristina. It dates back to 3500 BC in the Neolithic Era and it is made of clay. In Pristina there is also "Hamami i Qytetit" (The City Bath) and the house of Emin Gjika which has been transformed to the Ethnographic Museum. Pristina also has its municipal archive which was established in the 1950s and holds all the records of the city, municipality and the region.

=== Media ===
Media in Pristina include some of the most important newspapers, largest publishing houses and most prolific television studios of Kosovo. Pristina is the largest communications center of media in Kosovo. Almost all of the major media organizations in Kosovo are based in Pristina. The television industry developed in Pristina and is a significant employer in the city's economy. The four major broadcast networks, RTK, RTV21, KTV and KLAN KOSOVA are all headquartered in Pristina. Radio Television of Kosovo (RTK) is the only public broadcaster both in Pristina and in all of Kosovo as well, that continues to be financed directly by the state. All of the daily newspapers in Pristina have a readership throughout Kosovo. An important event which affected the development of the media, is that in University of Pristina since 2005 is established the Journalism Faculty within the Faculty of Philology in which are registered a large number of youth people.

=== Music ===
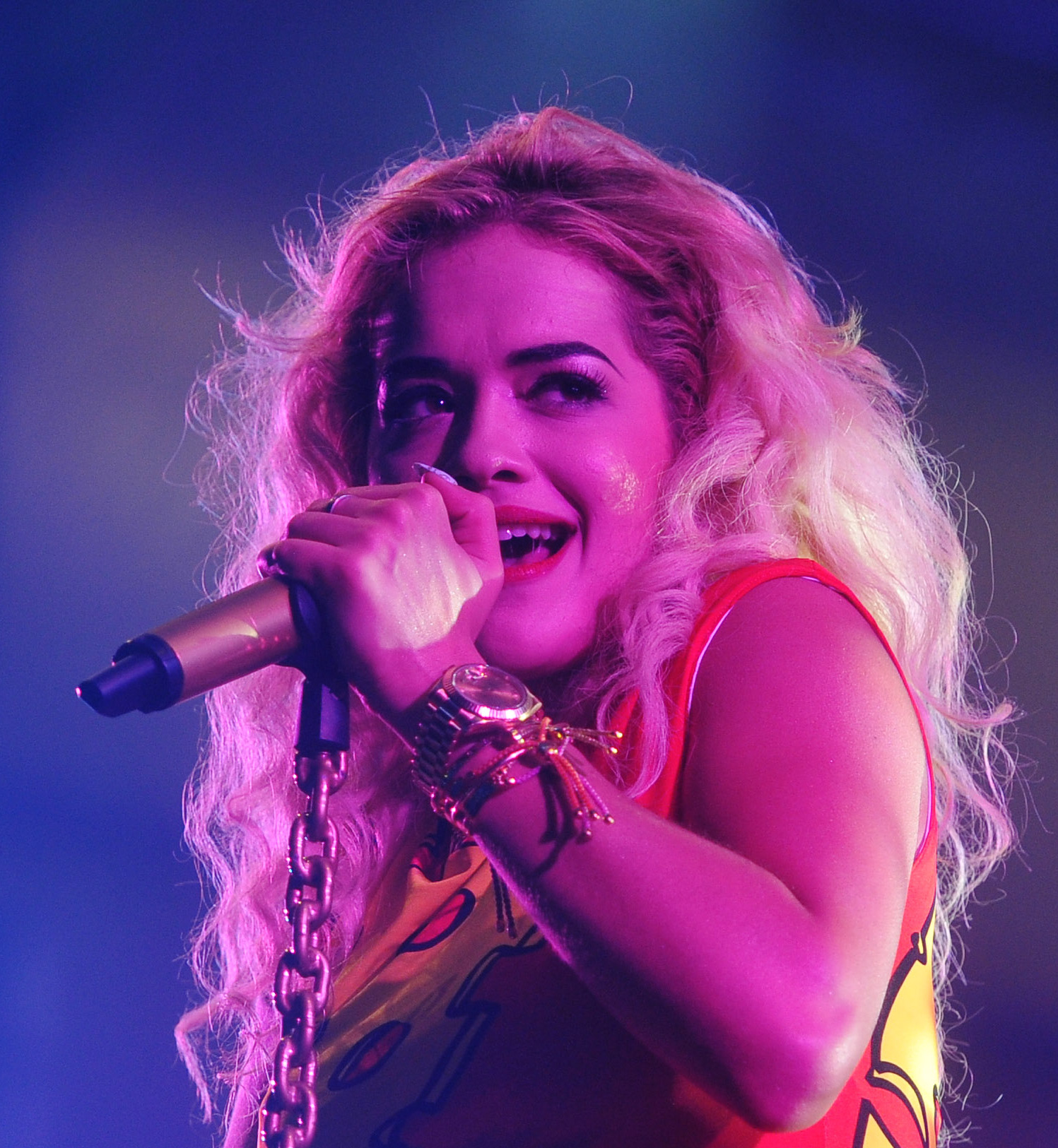
Singer Rita Ora was born in Pristina to Albanian parents

Albanian music is considered to be very rich in genres and their development. But before talking about genre development, a key point that has to be mentioned is without doubt the rich folklore of Kosovo most of which unfortunately has not been digitalized and saved in archives. The importance of folklore is reflected in two main keys, it is considered a treasure" of cultural heritage of our country and it helps to enlighten the Albanian history of that time, and the importance of that is of a high level especially when mentioning the circumstances of our territory in that time. Folklore has also served as inspiration and influence in many fields including music composition in the next generations One of the most notable and very first composers, Rexho Mulliqi in whose work, folklore inspiration and influence is very present.

When highlighting the music creativity and its starts in Kosovo and the relation between it and the music creativity in Albania even though they have had their development in different circumstances, it is proved that they share some characteristics in a very natural way. This fact shows that they belong to one "Cultural Tree".

Some of few international music artists of Albanian heritage that were born or their families were from Pristina are Rita Ora, Dua Lipa and Era Istrefi.

=== Theatre ===
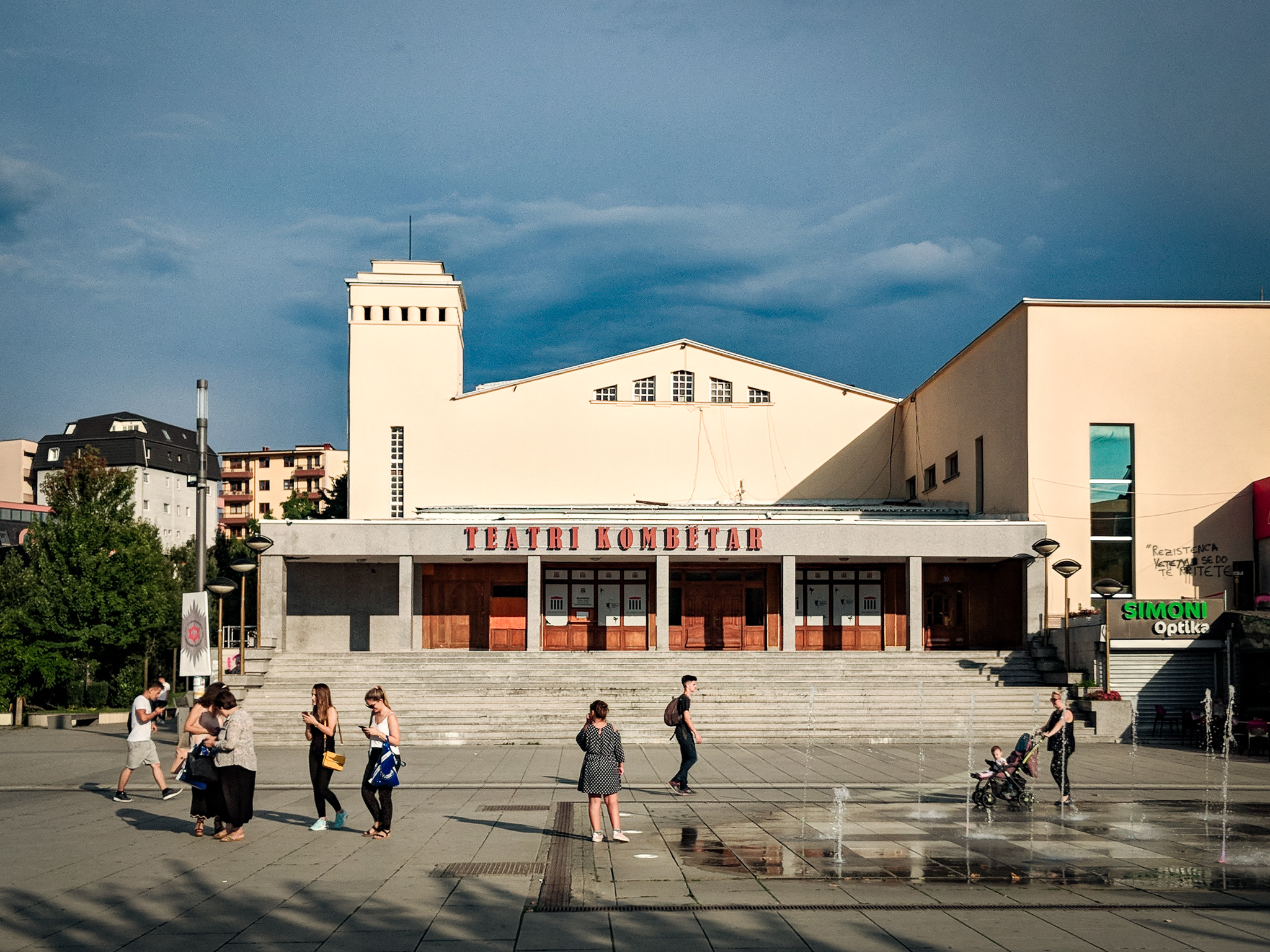
The National Theater of Kosovo, lies in the city center on the Skanderbeg Square

The city of Pristina hosts only three active theatres such as the National Theater, Oda and Dodona Theatre placed in center of Pristina. They offer live performances every week. The National Theatre, foiunded in 1946, is in the city centre, near the main government building. ODA Theatre is situated in the Youth Center Building and Dodona Theatre is found in Vellusha district, which is near Ibrahim Rugova Square. The National Theatre of Kosovo is the highest-ranked theatre in the country and has the largest number of productions. It is the only public theater in Kosovo and therefore it is financed by Ministry of Culture, Youth and Sport. This theatre has produced more than 400 premieres, which have been watched by more than 3 million spectators.

=== Festivals ===
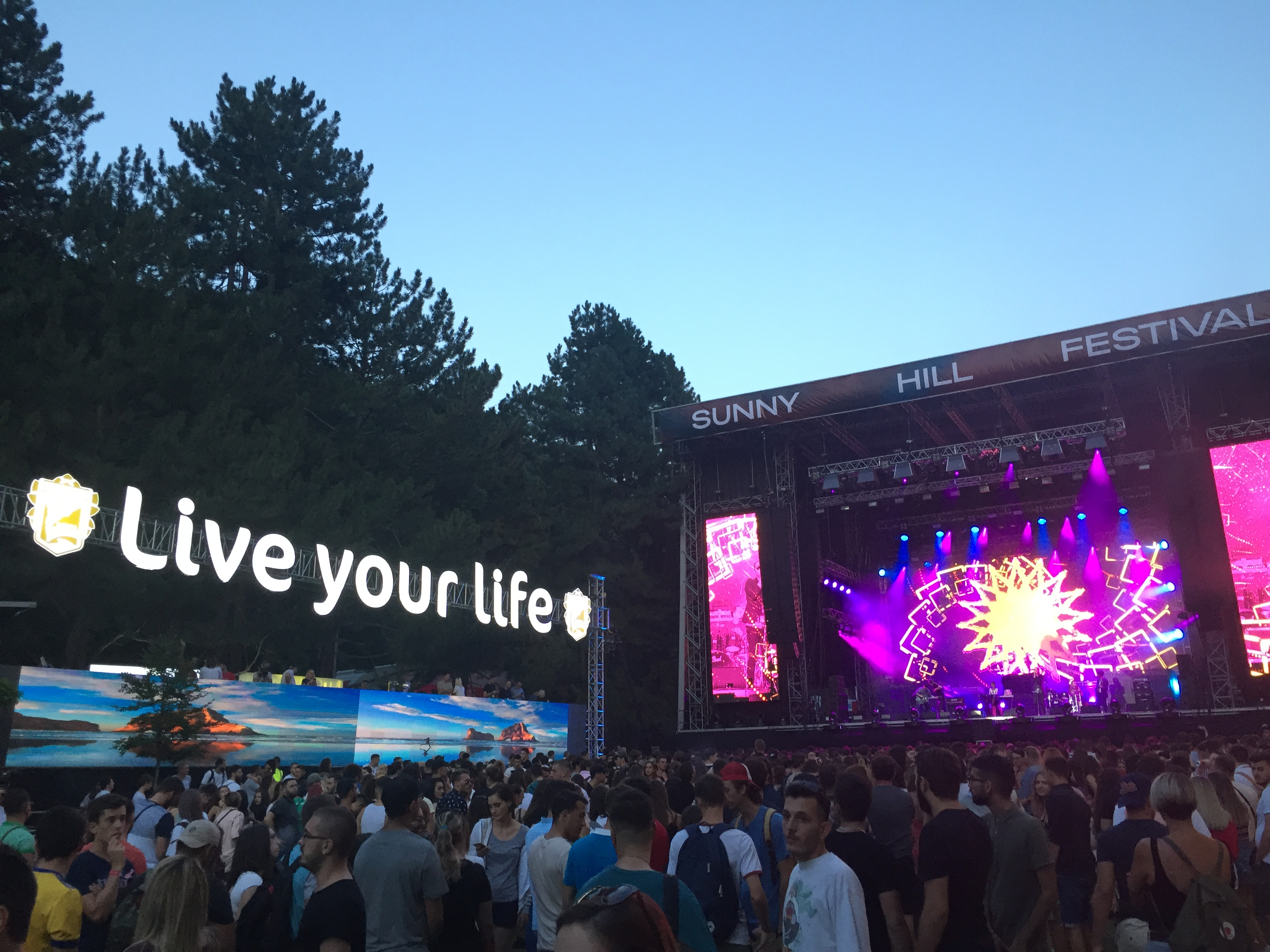
Sunny Hill Festival in the first year (2018)

The Sunny Hill Festival takes place in Pristina annually and it is the largest festival in Kosovo. It attracts over 100,000 music enthusiasts globally. The festival features renowned performers of contemporary times and notable figures on music charts, such as Dua Lipa, Miley Cyrus, J Balvin, Calvin Harris, Martin Garrix, Afrojack, Hardwell, Stormzy, Skepta, AJ Tracey, Action Bronson, Gashi, and numerous other regional and international artists and performers.

The Prishtina International Film Festival screens prominent international cinema productions in the Balkan region and beyond, and draws attention to the Kosovar film industry. It was created after the 2008 Kosovo declaration of independence. After its independence in 2008, Kosovo looked for ways to promote its cultural and artistic image.

One of major festivals include the Chopin Piano Fest Pristina that was established for the first time on the occasion of the 200th birth anniversary of Frédéric Chopin in 2010 by the Kosovo Chopin Association. The festival is becoming a traditional piano festival held in spring every year. It is considered to be a national treasure. In its 5 years of formation it has offered interpretations by both world-famous pianists such as Peter Donohoe, Janina Fialkowska, Kosovo-Albanian musicians of international renown like Ardita Statovci, Alberta Troni and local talents. The Festival strives to promote the art of interpretation, the proper value of music and the technicalities that accompany it. The Festival has served as inspiration for the formation of other music festivals like Remusica and Kamerfest.

The DAM Festival Pristina is one of the most prominent cultural events taking place in the capital. It is an annual music festival which gathers young and talented national and international musicians from all over the world. This festival works on enriching the Kosovar cultural scene with the collision of the traditional and the contemporary. The festival was founded by musician Dardan Selimaj.

=== Sports ===
Pristina is the center of sport in Kosovo, where activity is organized across amateur and professional levels, sport organizations and clubs, regulated by the Kosovo Olympic Committee and the Ministry of Culture, Youth and Sport. Sport is organized in units called Municipal Leagues. There are seven Municipal Leagues in Pristina. The Football Municipal consists of 18 clubs, the Basketball Municipal 5 clubs, the Handball Municipal 2 clubs, Table Tennis and Chess 6 clubs each, the Karate Municipal 15 and the Tennis Municipal 2 clubs. Football is the most popular sport in the city. It is represented by FC Prishtina, which plays their home games in the Fadil Vokrri Stadium. Basketball has been also one of the most popular sports in Pristina and is represented by KB Prishtina. It is the most successful basketball club in Kosovo and is part of the Balkan League. Joining it in the Superleague is another team from Pristina, RTV 21.

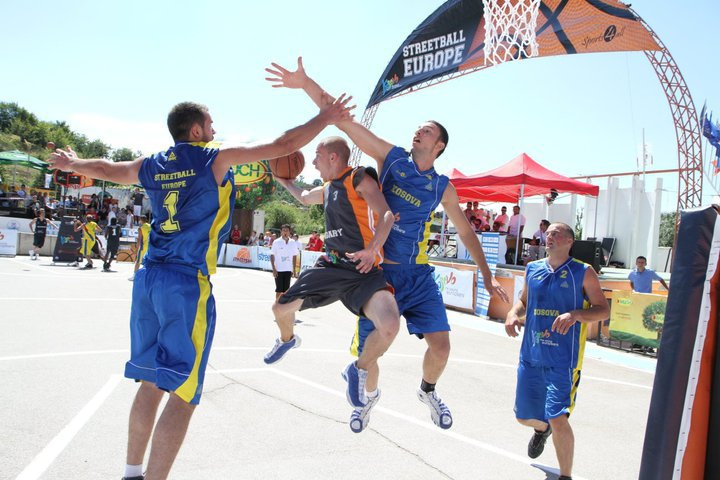
Streetballers at the Germia Park

Streetball is a traditionally organized sport and cultural event at the Germia Park since 2000. Apart from indoor basketball success, Che Bar team has been crowned the champion of the national championship in 2013. This victory coincided with Streetball Kosovo's acceptance in FIBA. Handball is also very popular. Pristina's representatives are recognized internationally and play international matches.

In September 2023, Pristina was named host city for the 2030 Mediterranean Games.

== Transport ==
Pristina constitutes the economic and financial heart of Kosovo, in part due to its high population, modern infrastructure and geographical location in the center of the country. Following the 2008 Kosovo declaration of independence, the city has undergone significant improvements and developments vastly modernizing and expanding the economy, infrastructure and most notably transportation by air, rail and road.

=== Road ===
Pristina is the most important and frequent road junction of Kosovo as all of the major expressways and motorways passes through the city limits. Most of the motorways of Kosovo are largely completed and partially under construction or under planning process. Prishtina is already connected to Albania through the Ibrahim Rugova Motorway, which has significantly shorten the time between Prishtina and the Albanian capital of Tirana as well as the port city of Durrës. Pristina has also direct access to Skopje through the R6 motorway.

=== Public transport ===
==== Buses ====
The Trafiku Urban city's buses serve to maintain a high level of connectivity between Prishtina many different districts and beyond. It operates with 15 lines in the urban area and more private lines that go through rural areas. Lines are operated through a public-private partnership, with more than 80 buses on the fleet altogether. In the beginning of the year 2025, the Municipality of Prishtina announced a new unified bus ticket to use on all buses, including privately operated ones, which would help with difficulties paying different tickets while travelling via bus.

==== Trains ====
Pristina effectively has two train stations. Pristina railway station lies west of the center, while Fushë Kosovë railway station is Kosovo's railway hub. Pristina is serviced by a train that travels through Pristina to Skopje daily.

Analysis from the Traffic Police have shown that, of 240,000 cars registered in Kosovo, around 100,000 (41%) are from the region of Pristina. The Pristina railway station is located near the city center.

=== Airport ===
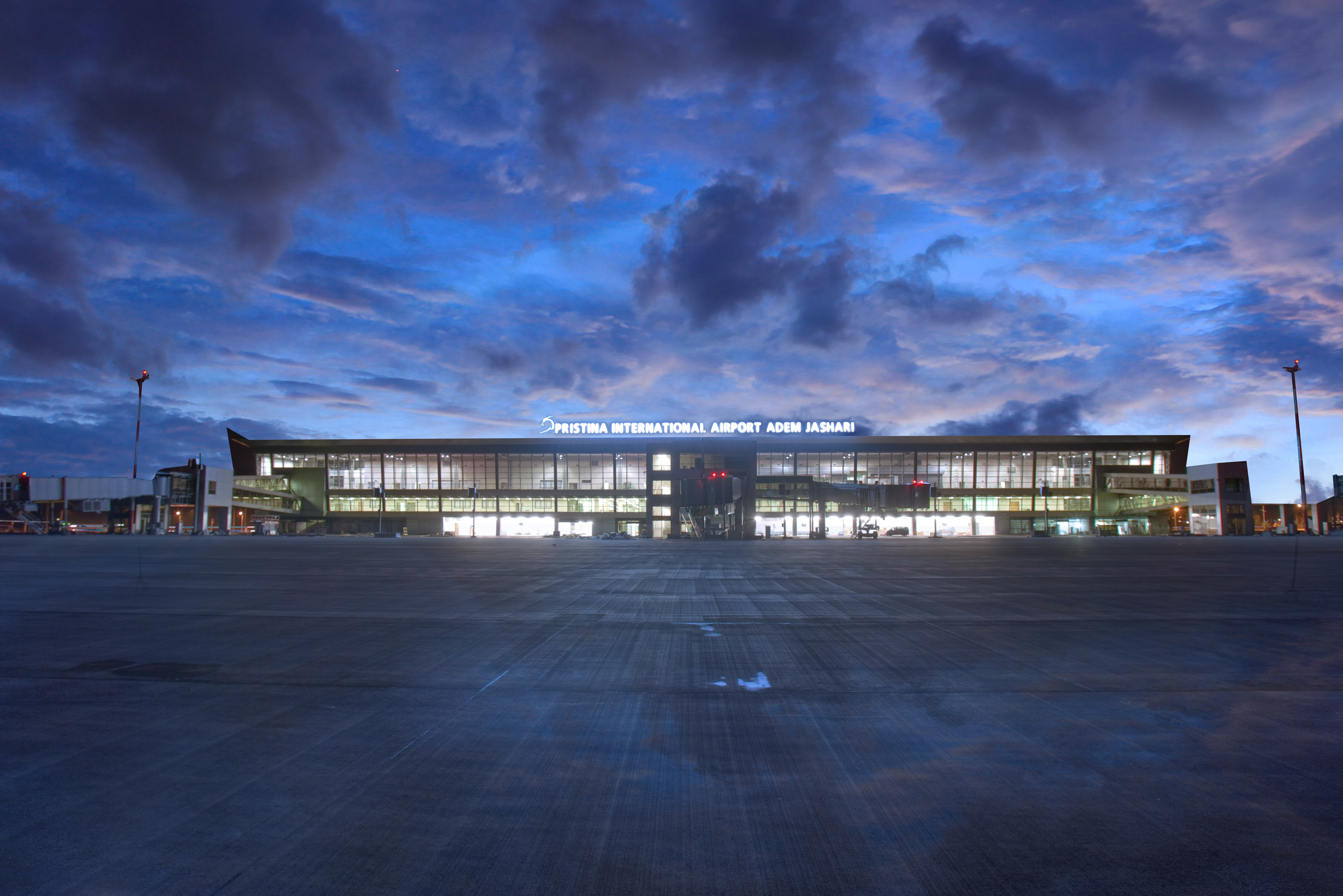
The terminal of Adem Jashari International Airport.

The Pristina International Airport serves as the premier gateway to the country and carries more than 4 million passengers per year with connections to many destinations around different countries and cities of Europe with the most frequent routes to Austria, Germany, Switzerland as well as to Slovenia, Turkey and the United Kingdom.

=== Cycling ===
During the administration of Përparim Rama, the municipality of Pristina introduced a new bike-sharing system named Prishtina Bikes, in partnership with Nextbike. There are around 100 bikes and 10 stations scattered around the city.

== Notable people ==
- Adelina Ismaili (b. 1979), Albanian singer and actress
- Ahmet Haxhiu (1932–1994), Hero of Kosovo, political activist
- Alban Ukaj (b. 1980), Albanian actor
- Albin Kurti (b. 1975), Prime Minister of Kosovo
- Aleksandar Arsenijević (b. 1992), Kosovo Serb politician
- Ardian Bujupi (b. 1991), Albanian and German singer and songwriter
- Arta Bajrami (b. 1980), Albanian singer and songwriter
- Aziz Salihu (b. 1953), Albanian Super heavyweight boxer
- Beg Ferati, (b. 1986), Albanian footballer
- Behgjet Pacolli (b. 1951), Albanian and Swiss politician
- Besart Berisha (b. 1985), Albanian football coach and former player
- Capital T (b. 1992), Albanian rapper and songwriter
- Dafina Zeqiri (b. 1980), Albanian singer
- Dalibor Jevtić (b. 1978), Serb politician
- Dragan Tomić (1935–2022), Serbian politician
- Đurađ Branković (1377–1456), Serbian Despot
- Ejup Maqedonci (b. 1977), Albanian colonel, KLA fighter and the current Minister of Defense
- Elyesa Bazna (1904–1970), German secret agent during World War II, of Albanian origin
- Era Istrefi (b. 1994), Albanian singer
- Ermal Fejzullahu (b. 1988), Albanian singer
- Enver Petrovci (1954–2025), Albanian actor, writer and director
- Gent Cakaj (b. 1990), Albanian politician, former Minister of Foreign Affairs of Albania
- Getoar Selimi (b. 1982), Albanian rapper and songwriter
- Glauk Konjufca (b. 1981), Albanian politician, current Minister of Foreign Affairs
- Goran Đorović (b. 1971), Serbian footballer
- Jana (b. 1974), Serbian turbo-folk and pop folk singer
- Kadri Prishtina (1878–1925), Albanian political figure
- Kaltrina Krasniqi (b. 1981), Kosovan film director
- Kenan Sipahi (b. 1995), Turkish basketball player
- Labinot Haliti (b. 1985), Albanian footballer
- Ledri Vula (b. 1986), Albanian rapper and songwriter
- Lirika Matoshi (b. 1996), Albanian fashion designer
- Lorik Cana (b. 1983), Albanian footballer
- Lumir Abdixhiku (b. 1983), Albanian politician
- Lyrical Son (b. 1984), Albanian rapper and songwriter
- Mazhar Krasniqi (1931–2019), Albanian businessman and human rights activist
- Majk (b. 1989), Albanian rapper and songwriter
- Marko Simonović (b. 1986), Serbian basketball player
- Mehmet Dragusha (b. 1977), Albanian footballer
- Melihate Ajeti (1935–2005), Albanian actress
- Mesihi of Prishtina (1470-?), Albanian poet, one of the best known Ottoman poets
- Milena Rašić (b. 1990), Serbian volleyball player
- Muharrem Qena (1930–2006), Albanian actor, director, writer and singer
- Nora Istrefi (b. 1986), Albanian singer
- Nebi Caka (b. 1946), Albanian engineer, linguist and academic
- Petar Palić (b. 1972), Croatian bishop
- Petrit Selimi (b. 1979), Albanian politician, entrepreneur and author, former Minister of Foreign Affairs
- Rasta (b. 1989), Serbian rapper, songwriter and producer
- Rita Ora (b. 1990), Albanian-British singer and actress
- Sava Petrović-Grmija (1882–1914), Serbian officer and member of the Serbian Chetnik Organization
- Savo Manojlović (b. 1986), Serbian lawyer and politician
- Slađana Đurić (b. 1964), Serbian scientist
- Tony Dovolani (b. 1973), Albanian-American ballroom dancer
- Tringa Hysa (b. 1996), Albanian ballet dancer
- Unikkatil (b. 1981), Albanian-American rapper and songwriter
- Valdet Gashi (1986–2015), German kickboxer and Islamic State terrorist of Albanian origin
- Visar Arifaj (b. 1987), Albanian politician
- Vladan Glišić (b. 1970), Serbian lawyer and politician
- Yll Limani (b. 1994), Albanian singer
- Zef Gashi (b. 1938), Archbishop of the Roman Catholic Church in Montenegro of Albanian origin
- Zoran Radosavljević (1965–1999), Serbian fighter pilot
- Zufer Avdija (b. 1959), Serbian-Israeli basketball coach
- Zvonimir Stević (b. 1957), Serbian politician

== International relations ==
Pristina is a founding member of the Union of Albanian Municipalities in the Region.

Pristina is twinned with: (Note: Citations regarding the twin or sister cities of Pristina:)

- Ankara, Turkey
- Bursa, Turkey
- Cospicua, Malta
- Des Moines, United States of America
- Karachi, Pakistan
- Kaohsiung, Taiwan
- Namur, Belgium

Pristina also has a partnership agreement with Zagreb.

== See also ==
- List of people from Pristina
