= Pristina railway station =

Railway station in Pristina, Kosovo

Pristina Railway station Stacioni hekurudhor i Prishtinës (Albanian)
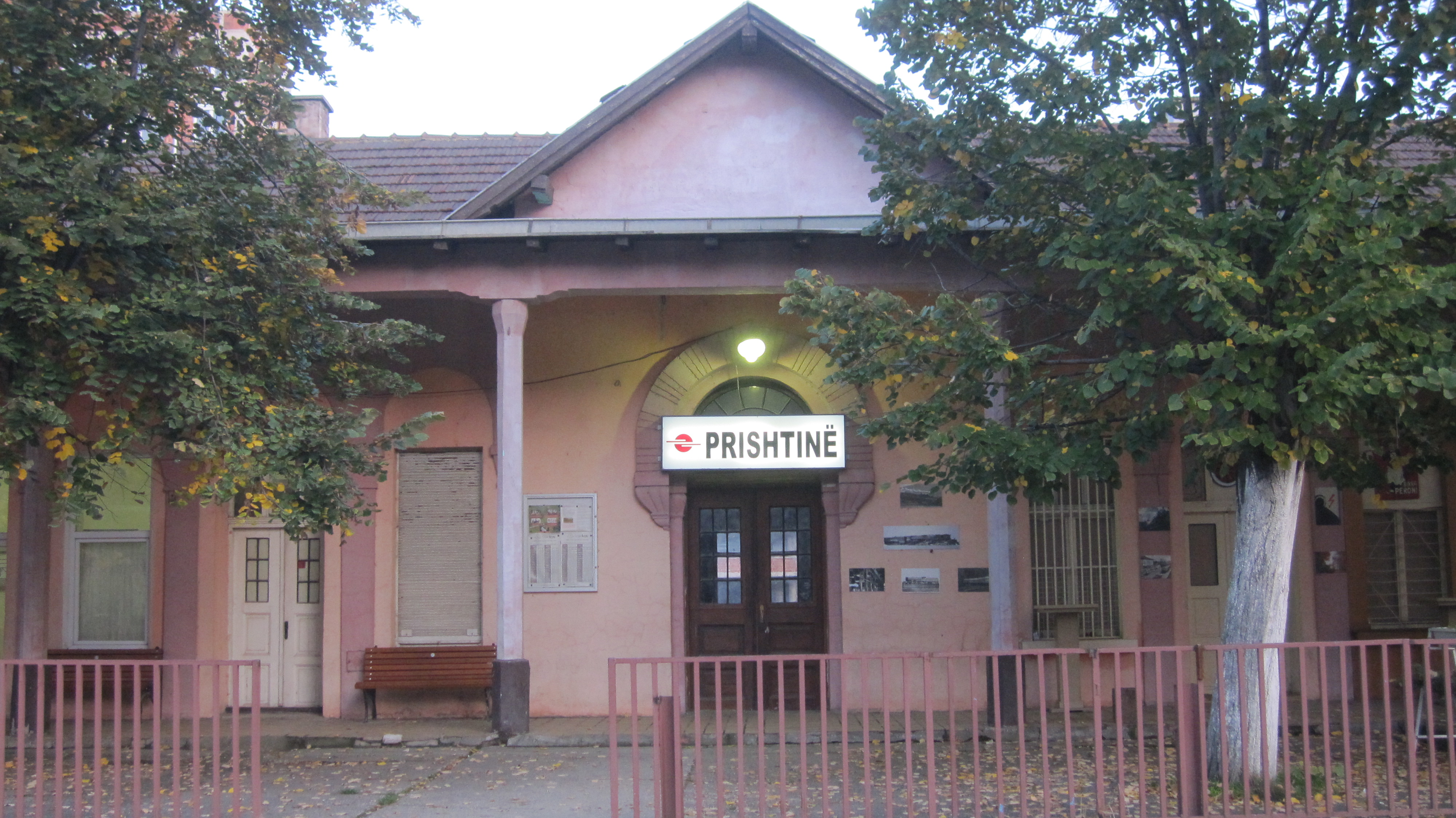
- View of the station from the back

General information
- Location: Pristina; Kosovo
- Coordinates: 42.658934°N 21.151067°E
- Owner: Infrakos
- Platforms: 2
- Tracks: 2
- Train operators: Trainkos

Construction
- Structure type: At-grade

History
- Opened: 1936; 90 years ago
Location
- Location within Kosovo

Pristina railway station (Note: Albanian: Stacioni hekurudhor i Prishtinës; Serbian: Приштинска железничка станица / Prištinska železnička stanica) is the central railway station in the city of Pristina, the capital of Kosovo. It opened on Tirana Boulevard in 1936, having been constructed by a French/British company. Trains calling at the station are operated by Trainkos sh.a.

The line on which the station sits is single-track, laid to standard gauge, but there is a loop at the station, allowing trains to pass there, with a second, parallel, loop lying out-of-use as of October 2016.

The train routes are currently out of service.

== Events ==
During the era when Kosovo was part of the Socialist Federal Republic of Yugoslavia, the country's leader Marshall Tito occasionally visited Pristina, arriving on his personal Blue Train.

During the 1999 Kosovo War, Serbian and Yugoslav regular forces, in conjunction with paramilitaries, conducted large-scale ethnic cleansing of ethnic Albanian inhabitants of Pristina through the station. Many of those expelled were directed onto trains apparently brought there for the express purpose of deporting them to the Macedonian border, where they were forced into exile.

The station was restored by British soldiers, serving as part of KFOR, later in 1999.
