= Bardhosh =

Bardhosh: Девет Југовића/Devet Jugovića (Serbian)
- Suburb
- Location within Kosovo
- Coordinates: 42.716081°N 21.149601°E
- Country: Kosovo
- District: Pristina
- Municipality: Pristina
- Elevation: 596 m (1,955 ft)

Population (2024)
  - Total: 3,126
- Time zone: UTC+1 (CET)
  - Summer (DST): UTC+2 (CEST)

Bardhosh (Serbian: Бардхош, romanized: Bardhoš), previously known as Nëntë Jugoviq (Serbian: Девет Југовића, romanized: Devet Jugovića), is a village of the Pristina municipality, Kosovo.
