= Rail transport in Kosovo =

Railway transport system in Kosovo

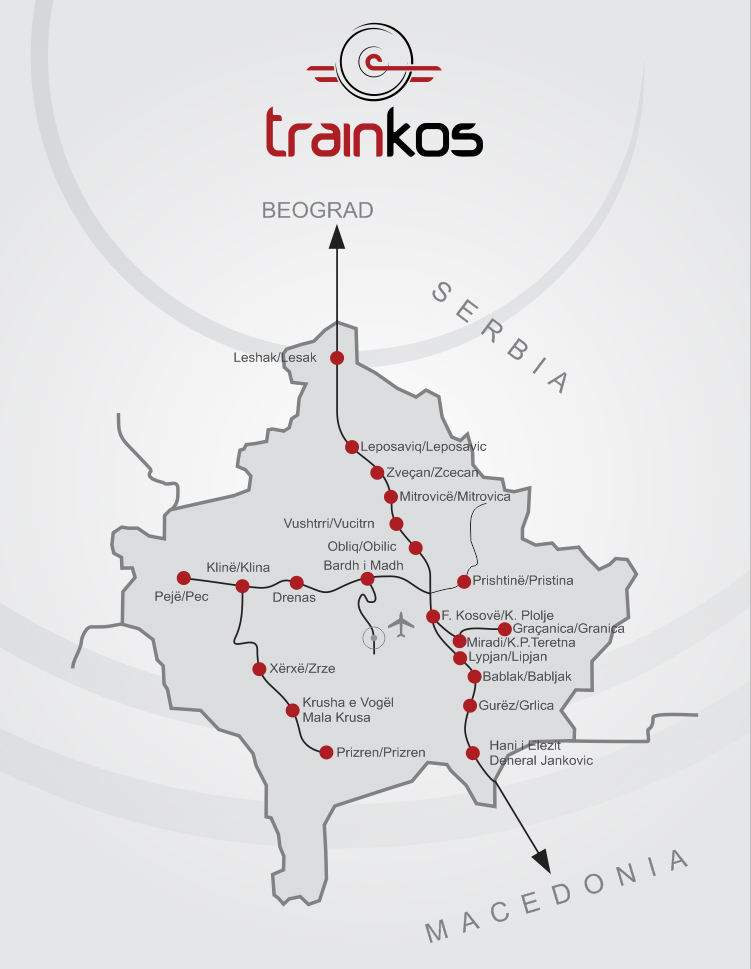
- a map depicting the rails in Kosovo

Overview
- Operator: Trainkos
- Headquarters: Fushë Kosovë, Kosovo
- Locale: Kosovo
- Dates of operation: 1874–present
- Predecessor: Kosovo Railways / Hekurudhat e Kosovës

Technical
- Electrification: None
- Length: 335.079 km (208.208 mi)

Other
- Website: www.trainkos.com infrakos.com

The railway network in Kosovo forms the country's railway system, with Infrakos responsible for managing the railway infrastructure and Trainkos operating passenger and freight railway services.

== History ==
The construction of the Kosovar rail network began in 1874 with the construction of the line between Hani i Elezit, Fushë Kosova and Mitrovica. The railway became very significant for the transportation of travellers and goods, as well as for the economic development of the country and connectivity with other regions. During the 20th century, the following lines were built: Mitrovica – Leshak and Fushë Kosova – Pristina in 1934, Fushë Kosova – Peja in 1936, Pristina– Besjana – Livadica in 1949, and Klina – Prizren in 1963.

On 27 September 1999, the Kosovo Train for Life charter train arrived in Pristina, bringing aid and rolling stock in connection with the Kosovo Force peace-keeping efforts.

In 2014, the rail infrastructure covered most of the country and connected all major cities with the exception of Gjilan and Gjakova. By August 2025, however, only one train line saw daily service, between Pristina and Peja.

== Trains ==
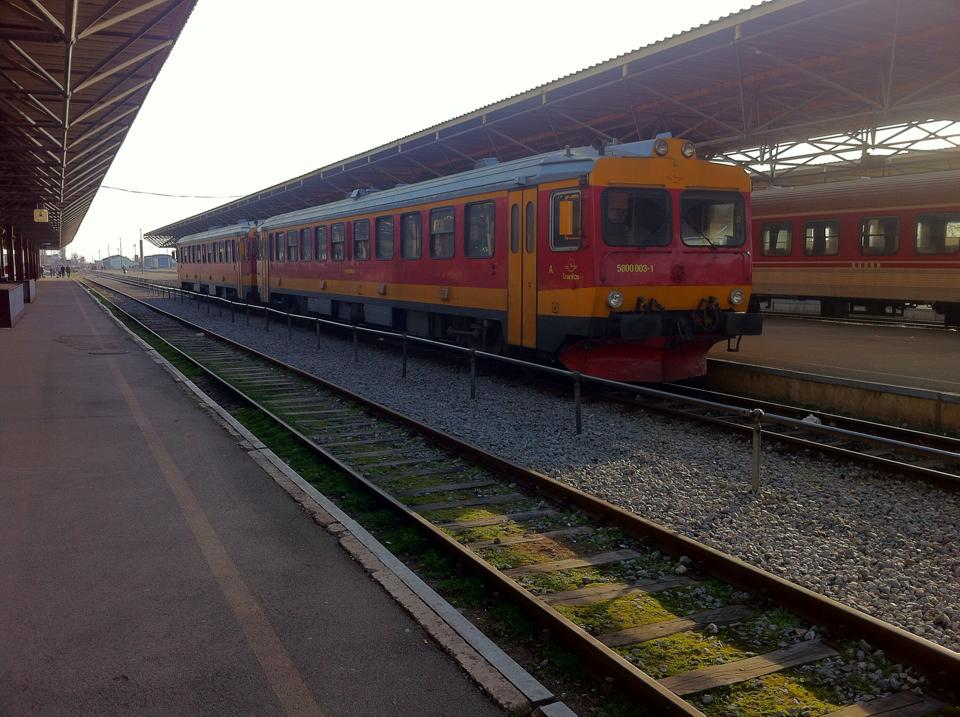
Y1 railcar

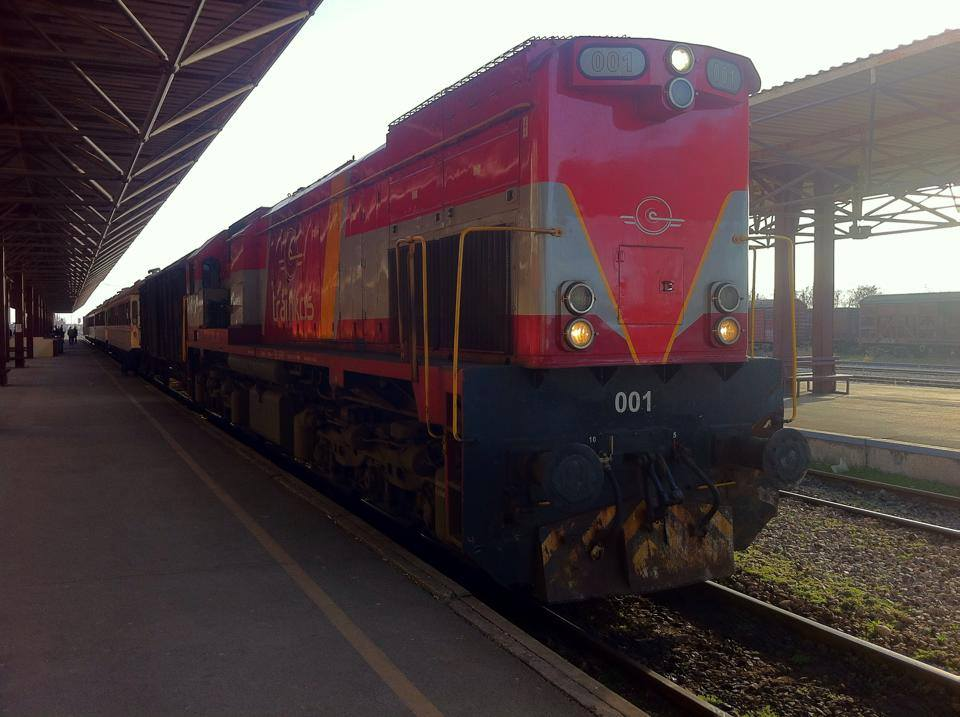
EMD GT22HW-2 diesel-electric locomotive

Trainkos operates diesel locomotives and passenger coaches for domestic passenger services, as well as locomotives and wagons for freight transport. Its rolling stock includes locomotives originating from the former Yugoslav Railways and locomotives acquired or rebuilt from other railway operators. The locomotive fleet has included JŽ 661-derived locomotives, EMD GT22HW-2 locomotives and EMD JT38CW-DC locomotives. NOHAB Di 3 locomotives were formerly operated by Trainkos but are no longer in regular service. The Y1 diesel railcars were also formerly used for passenger services but were not in operation in 2025.

The railways of Kosovo have historically played a role in the transportation of passengers and goods. Passenger numbers were estimated at 870 passengers per day in 2005. This increased to 1,100 passengers per day in 2006 and 1,143 in 2007. In 2008, passenger numbers decreased by 18.77% to approximately 929 passengers per day, before increasing by 10.51% in 2009 to 1,026 passengers per day. In 2010, passenger numbers increased slightly to 1,032 passengers per day.

Passenger traffic subsequently declined substantially. In 2011, Trainkos recorded 279,330 passengers, followed by 267,901 in 2012 and 276,852 in 2013. By 2024, annual passenger numbers had fallen to 68,743. In 2025, passenger numbers increased to 88,036, representing a 28.07% increase compared with 2024. Passenger transport during 2025 was limited to the Pristina–Peja–Pristina line because of the rehabilitation works on Railway Line 10, with six trains per day. Trainkos reported that the passenger figure does not include passengers exempt from travel fees, as no mechanism for recording them had yet been established.

Freight transport has also declined substantially from its historical levels. Trainkos recorded 877,332 tonnes of freight in 2010, 748,667 tonnes in 2011, 488,539 tonnes in 2012 and 778,134 tonnes in 2013. In 2024, only 1,984.66 tonnes were transported, while freight transport recorded 0 tonnes in 2025 because of the closure of Railway Line 10.

For a detailed list of Trainkos rolling stock, see Trainkos § Rolling stock.

== Services ==
=== Domestic transport ===
As of mid-2026, Trainkos only offers passenger service on one line: a local train running twice every day from Peja to Pristina and back.

=== International transport ===
==== Current and suspended international services ====
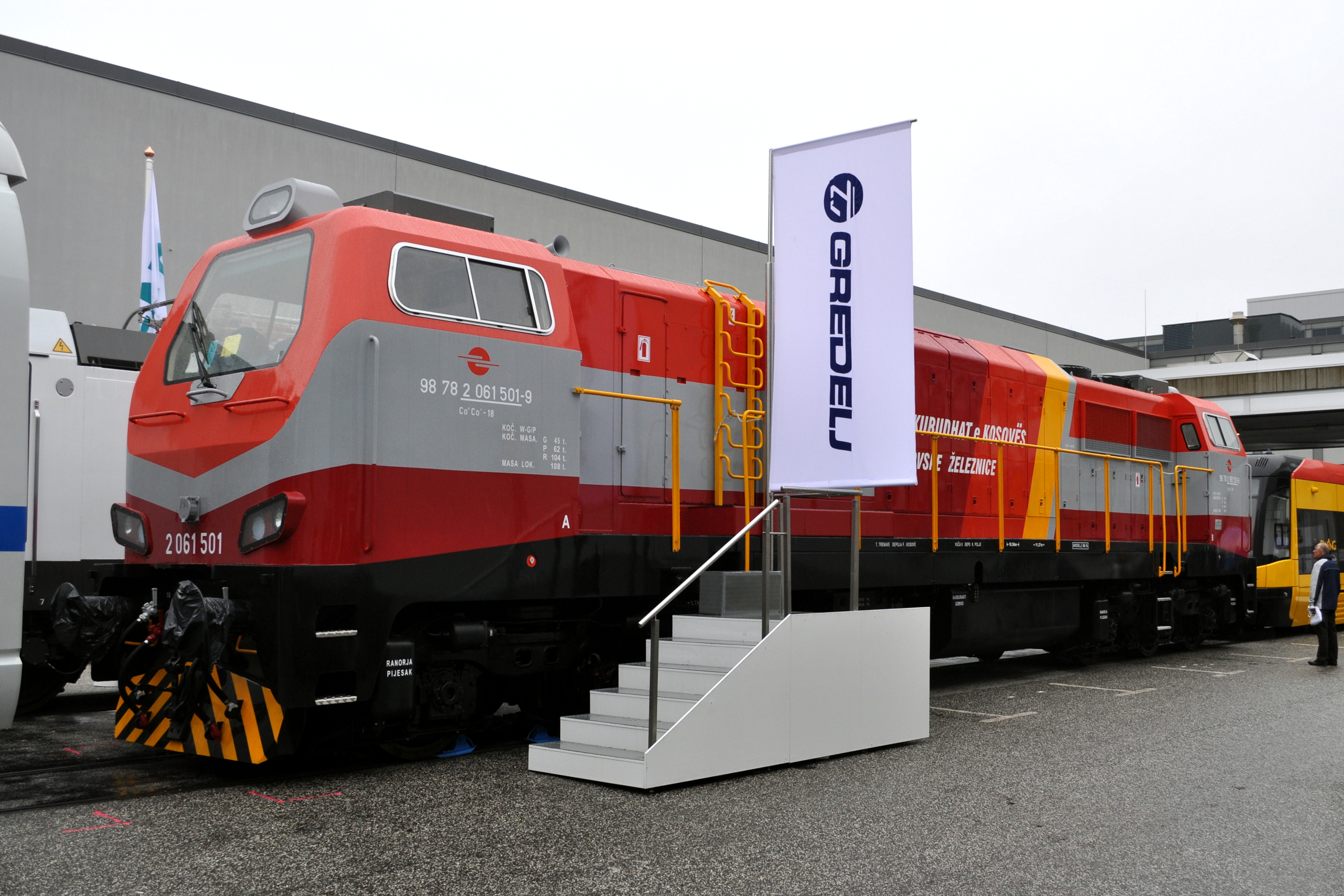
A JT38CW-DC locomotive at InnoTrans 2010. This locomotive was later used on the Pristina–Skopje line.

The railway connection between Pristina and Skopje in North Macedonia is Kosovo's principal international passenger railway connection. The route runs from Pristina via Fushë Kosovë, Ferizaj and Hani i Elezit to Skopje. Trainkos has operated international passenger services on the route in cooperation with the railway operator in North Macedonia.

Passenger service on the Pristina–Skopje route has been suspended since 2020. The suspension is related to the rehabilitation works on the railway line between Fushë Kosovë and Hani i Elezit.

- Albania – No connection
- Montenegro – No connection
- North Macedonia – Closed
- Serbia – Closed in Zvečan/Lešak and closed in Merdare

=== Former international connections and services ===
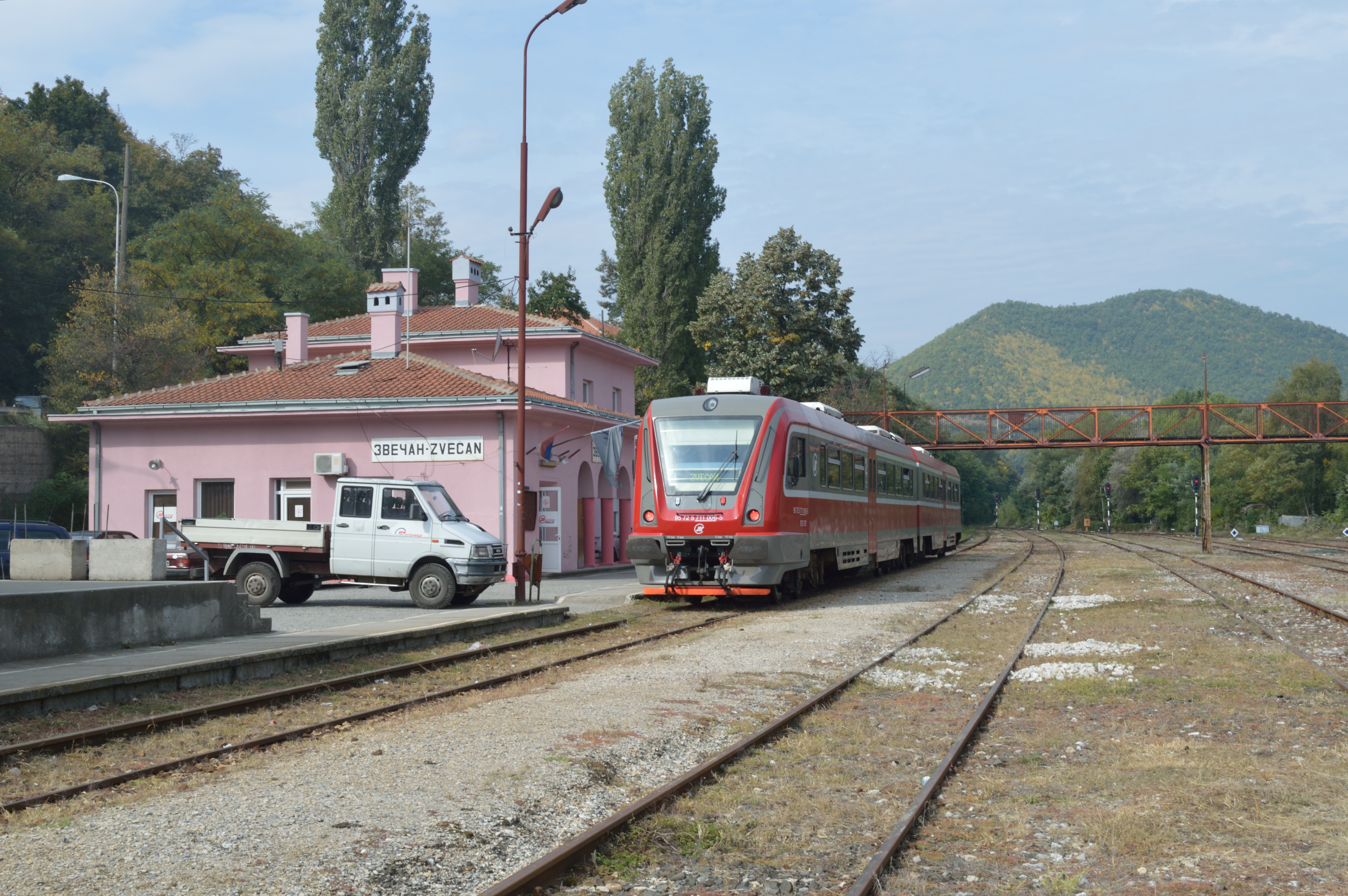
A Serbian Railways 711 train at Zvečan railway station in September 2013

From June 2008, Serbian Railways operated regular passenger services from Serbia to Zvečan in northern Kosovo, later extending the service to North Mitrovica. The services operated without authorization from Kosovo's railway authorities, which considered the operation illegal. The operation was also part of the wider political dispute over the administration of northern Kosovo. The services ended in 2020 during the COVID-19 pandemic, when trains from central Serbia stopped entering Kosovo and began terminating at Rudnica near the Jarinje crossing.

On 28 May 2026, Kosovo authorities took control of railway facilities in Zvečan and Leposaviq that had previously been operated by Serbian Railways. Kosovo's acting Minister of Infrastructure stated that all public railway facilities and properties in northern Kosovo had returned to the full management of INFRAKOS.

- North Macedonia – 1999–2020
- Yugoslavia – 1999–2003
- Serbia and Montenegro – 2003–2006
- Serbia – 2008–2020 (operated without authorization from Kosovo railway authorities)

== Future developments ==
=== Modernisation of Railway Line 10 ===
The modernisation of Railway Line 10, Kosovo's main north–south railway corridor, is being carried out in phases. The first major phase covers the section between Fushë Kosovë and Hani i Elezit on the border with North Macedonia. The works include the rehabilitation of tracks, tunnels and bridges, as well as signalling and electrification systems. The project has received financial support from the European Union, the European Investment Bank and the European Bank for Reconstruction and Development.

=== Kosovo–Albania railway ===
The planned Pristina–Durrës railway would connect Kosovo with the Port of Durrës on the Adriatic coast. The planned route would connect Pristina with Durrës through Gjakova and Shkodër. The feasibility study and preliminary design for the project were completed in 2025. In September 2026, the Government of Kosovo announced plans to begin construction of the Gjakova–Shkodër section as part of the planned Pristina–Durrës railway connection.

=== Restoration of the Kosovo–North Macedonia railway connection ===
Kosovo and North Macedonia have discussed restoring railway traffic between the two countries and establishing a joint railway border crossing. The connection would restore international passenger and freight railway traffic between Pristina and Skopje via Hani i Elezit and Blace. As of August 2026, the restoration was under discussion between the two countries and no fixed reopening date had been announced.

== Statistics ==
=== Passenger Transport ===
Year	Number of passengers	Ticket sales in EUR
2025	88,036	78,938
2024	68,743	59,397
2023	70,517	61,356
2022	71,696	61,110
2021	61,081	51,205
2020	58,819	48,075
2019	120,309	104,392
2018	118,466	97,424
2017	156,618	123,382
2016	278,190	203,216
2015	268,372	204,669
2014	352,410	250,711
2013	276,852	179,515
2012	267,901	171,943
2011	279,330	193,593
2010	281,650	184,972

=== Freight Transport ===
Year	Tons of goods (Net)	Revenues in EUR
2025	0	5,995
2024	1,985	16,704
2023	195,671	478,406
2022	22,340	145,584
2021	538,012	1,133,104
2020	334,150	794,297
2019	487,932	1,035,705
2018	268,700	587,888
2017	432,329	885,832
2016	244,649	646,002
2015	742,439	1,872,058
2014	837,830	2,665,437
2013	778,134	2,332,274
2012	488,539	1,601,675
2011	748,667	2,450,434
2010	877,332	2,864,370
