= Kosovo Train for Life =

1999 British aid mission during the Kosovo War

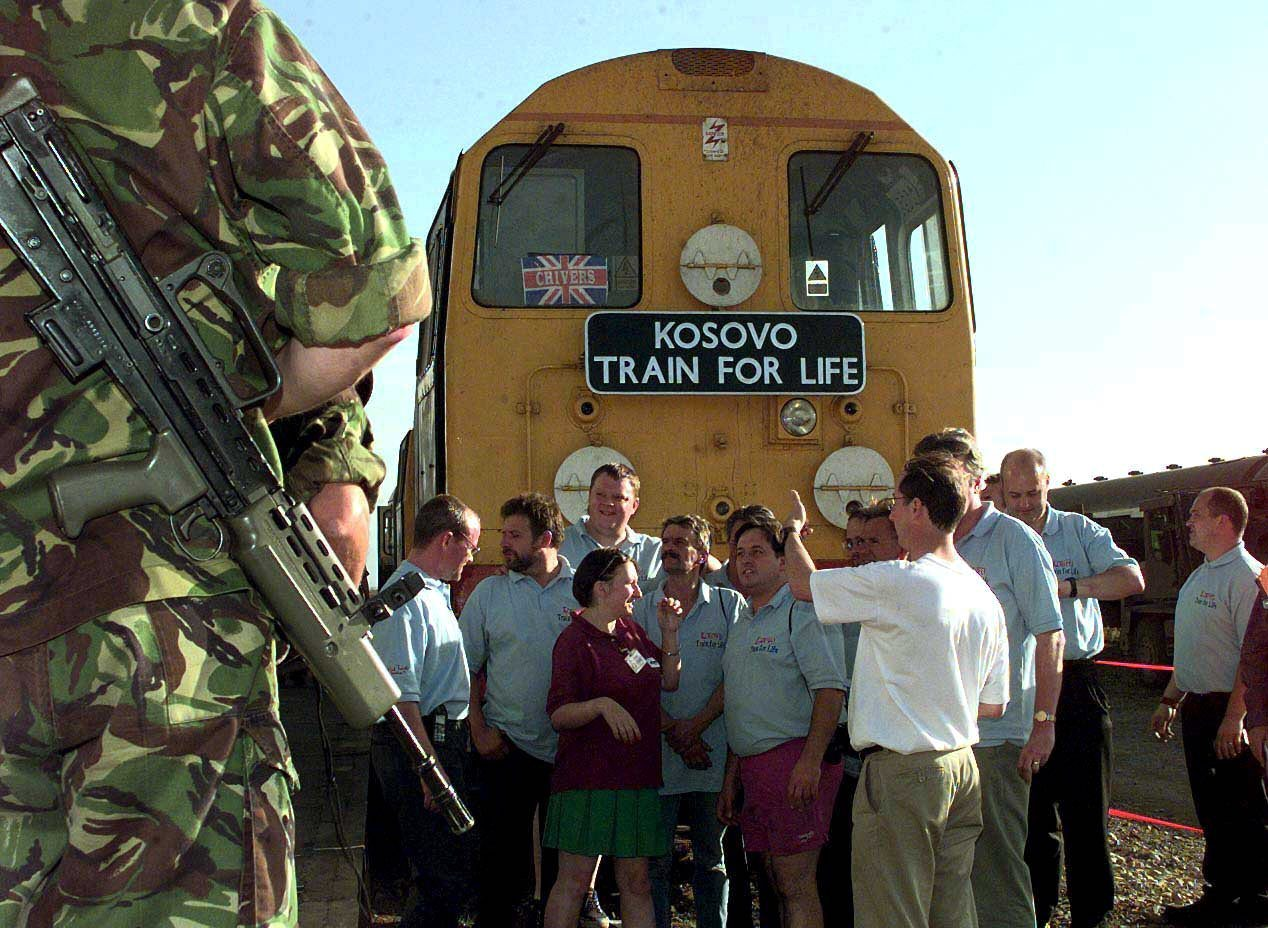
- Class 20 locomotive on arrival carrying "Kosovo Train for Life" headboard
- In service: 17–27 September 1999
- Operators: 79 Railway Squadron RLC
- Lines served: MR, RT, CT, RFF, SNCB, DB, ČD, ŽSR, MÁV, CFR, BDŽ, MŽ, UNMIK Railways

Specifications
- Maximum speed: 50 to 100 km/h 31 to 62 mph
- Weight: 740 tonnes
- AAR wheel arrangement: Bo'Bo'+Bo'Bo'+Bo'Bo'+...
- Braking system(s): Manual railway air brake
- Coupling system: Buffers and chain coupler
- Multiple working: ★ Blue Star (Class 20s)
- Track gauge: 1,435 mm (4 ft 8 1/2 in) standard gauge

The Kosovo Train for Life carried aid from the United Kingdom to Pristina, Kosovo, in September 1999 in connection with the United Nations Kosovo Force (KFOR) peacekeeping efforts after the Kosovo War.

== History ==
The train was hauled by British Rail Class 20 diesel locomotives 20903, 20901 and 20902 belonging to Direct Rail Services. The route covered 4,500 kilometres (2,800 mi) and the train arrived at Fushë Kosovë railway station in Kosovo Polje, near Pristina, on 27 September 1999 following delays —it had originally been intended to arrive on 25 September.

The trip had been organised by "Train of Events", a team of UK ex-British Rail personnel, including Neil Howard and John Morris. Drivers were provided by 79 Railway Squadron.

Loading took place at the Midland Railway – Butterley near Derby, with a "wave-off" organised at Kensington Olympia railway station. The route continued via the Channel Tunnel, Lille in France, Namur and Liège in Belgium. At Aachen in Germany additional rolling stock was attached with the train proceeding via Hamburg and Berlin-Lichtenberg station, to Dresden Hauptbahnhof. From Děčín the locomotives pulled the train under their own power.

The locomotives were subsequently deployed for rail transportation in Kosovo moving trains within Kosovo and to and from Skopje in Macedonia. The German couchette car 51 80 59-40 046-6 that had joined the train in Aachen also stayed in Kosovo. The three Class 20 locomotives were scheduled to stay for three months. After six months in Kosovo the three locomotives left Kosovo and returned to the United Kingdom by sea. The German couchette remains, without bogies, in Miradi yard.

In May 2000, model train manufacturer Lima released a limited run of 750 model OO gauge locomotives of 20901 in DRS livery with Kosovo Train for Life etched headboard plates.
