= Kosovo Polje railway station =

Railway station in Kosovo Polje, Kosovo

Kosovo Polje: Fushë Kosova or Fushë Kosovë (Albanian) Косово Поље / Kosovo Polje (Serbian)
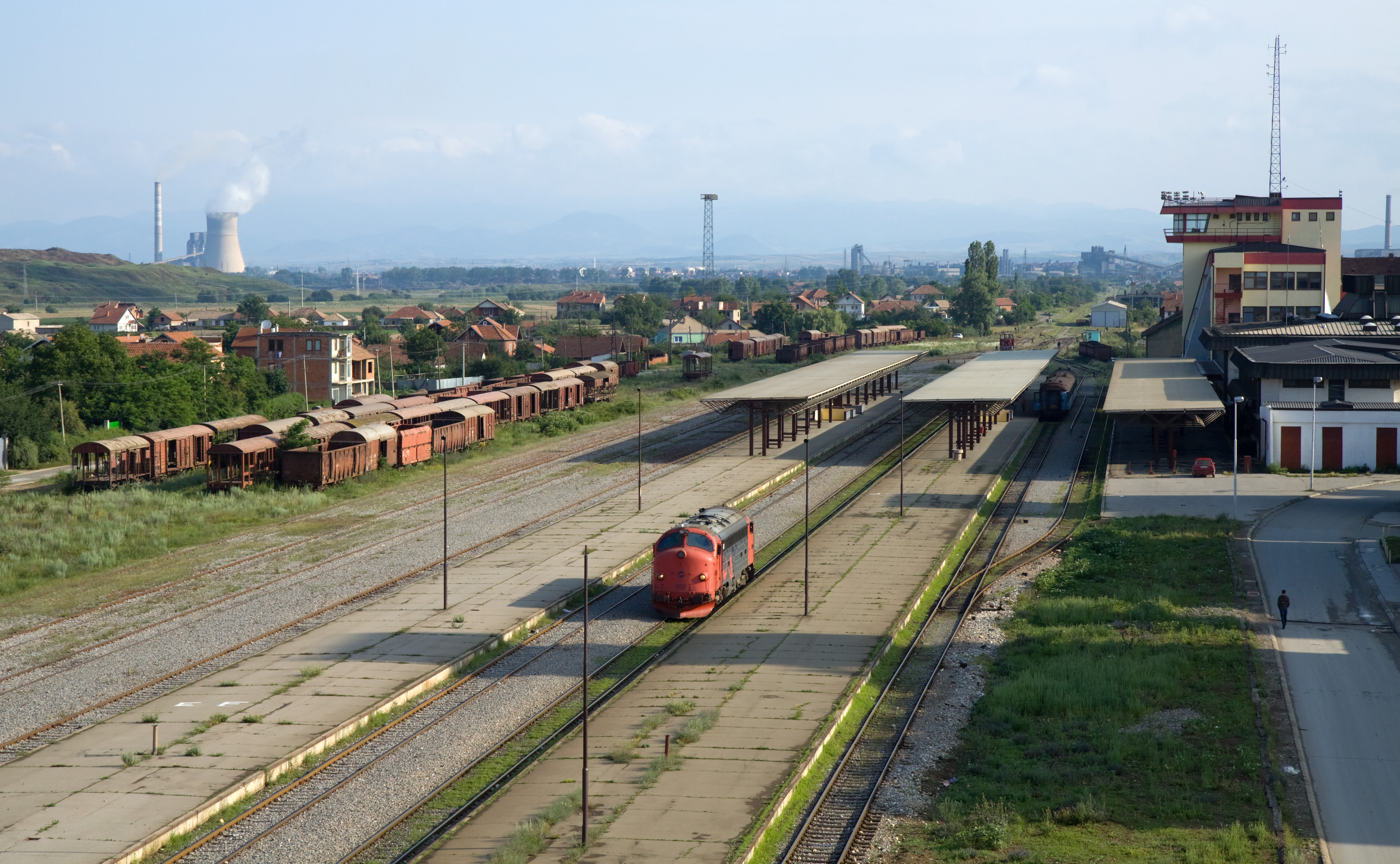
- The station in July 2009

General information
- Location: Kosovo Polje; Kosovo
- Coordinates: 42.6348°N 21.0815°E
Location

Kosovo Polje railway station (Fushë Kosova railway station) is a station in the town of Kosovo Polje, Kosovo. It is the largest railway station in Kosovo and headquarters of Kosovo Railways.

The station is situated in Pristina District, but the city of Pristina is served by Pristina railway station.

In September 1999, after the Kosovo War, the Kosovo Train for Life arrived at Kosovo Polje station, carrying 400 tonnes of aid, having traveled all the away from the United Kingdom, through the Channel Tunnel, and via France, Belgium, Germany, the Czech Republic, Slovakia and Hungary, Romania, Bulgaria, Greece and Macedonia, hauled by a trio of British Rail Class 20 diesel locomotives.

== Passenger transport ==
Fushë Kosova is served twice a day by the train line between Peja and Prishtina
