= 79 Squadron =

79 Squadron, 79th Squadron or No. 79 Squadron may refer to:

Aviation squadrons

- No. 79 Squadron RAAF, a unit of the Royal Australian Air Force
- No. 79 Squadron RAF, a unit of the United Kingdom Royal Air Force
- 79th Fighter Squadron (United States), a unit of the United States Air Force
- 79th Air Refueling Squadron, a unit of the United States Air Force
- 79th Rescue Squadron, a unit of the United States Air Force

Ground combat squadrons

- 79 Railway Squadron (United Kingdom), a unit of the United Kingdom Army's Royal Logistics Corps

== See also ==
- 79th Division (disambiguation)
