= Y1 (railcar) =

Diesel railcar

Kalmar Verkstad/Fiat Y1
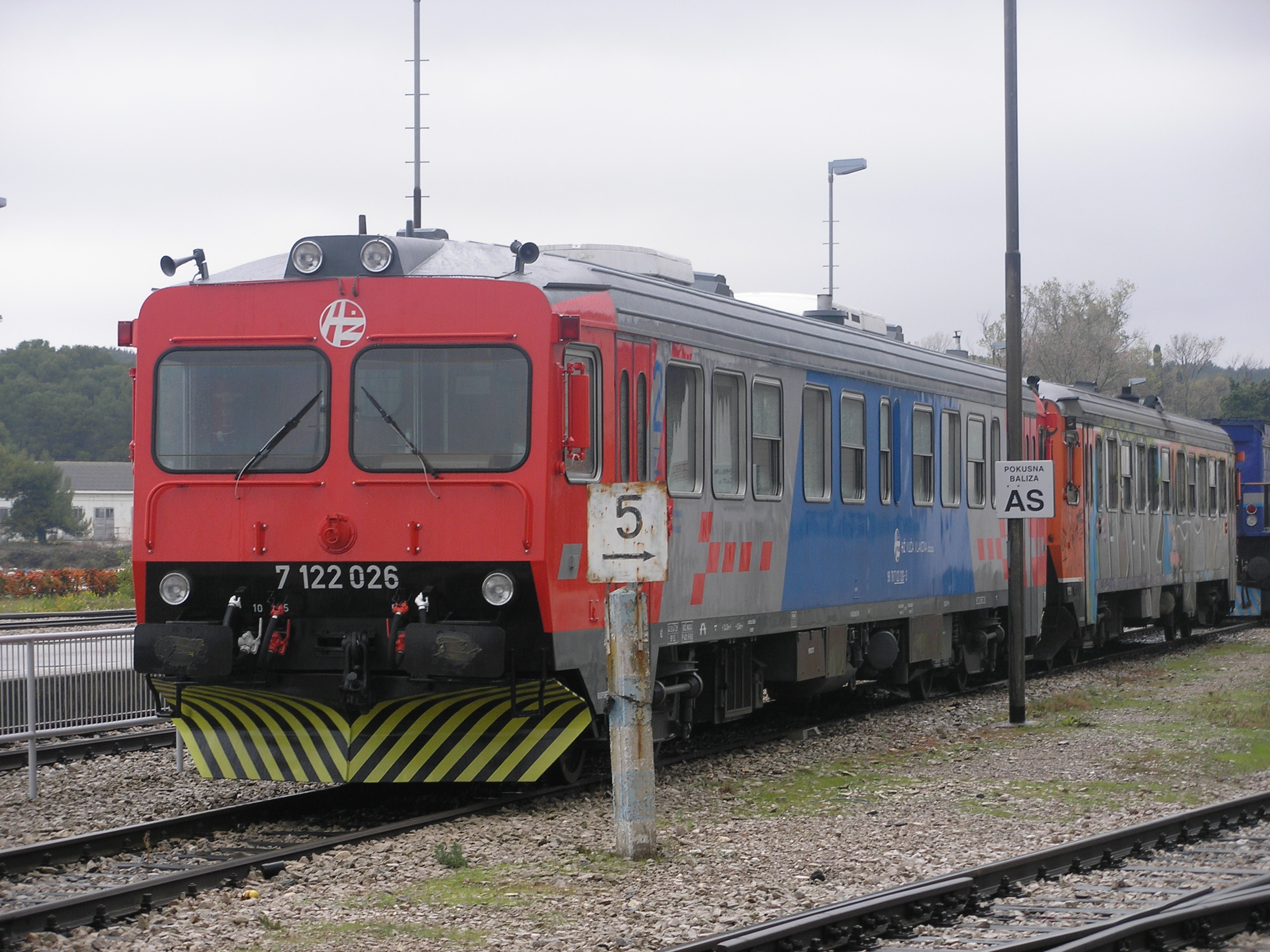
- A pair of Croatian Railways Y1 units
- Manufacturer: Fiat, Kalmar Verkstad
- Constructed: 1979–1981
- Number built: 100 (35 in HŽ)

Specifications
- Car length: 24.4 m (80 ft 1 in)
- Maximum speed: 130 km/h (81 mph)
- Weight: 47 t (46 long tons; 52 short tons)
- Prime mover(s): originally Fiat rebuilt with Volvo DH10
- Engine type: Diesel
- Power output: 294 kW (390 hp)
- Transmission: Hydraulic
- UIC classification: (1A)(A1)
- Track gauge: 1,435 mm (4 ft 8 1/2 in) standard gauge

The Y1 is a diesel-hydraulic standard gauge railcar (single self-propelling carriage). It is in use in Croatia, Serbia, Kosovo, Sweden and Uruguay. The production of the railcars was begun in 1980 by Kalmar Verkstad and Fiat Ferroviaria for Sweden.

== Italy ==
The Y1 is based on the Italian model ALn 668. This diesel railcar was built during the period 1954–1981, with 787 built.

== Sweden ==
SJ, the Swedish railways, needed new diesel railcars for lines like Inlandsbanan. SJ bought this model from Fiat. They were based on an existing model, but modified for Swedish needs. The first were produced in Italy, and later in Kalmar, Sweden. 100 vehicles were made during the period 1979–1981.

There were some variations, with some having a cargo area, needed in the remote parts of northern Sweden where mail and parcels are often transported by passenger buses and trains. They have 68 or 76 seats, but 48 only in those equipped with a cargo area. As first delivered, the vehicles had Fiat engines. During the 1990s several were updated and acquired new Volvo DH10 bus engines.

Many Y1s have been resold to other countries such as Uruguay and some of the former Yugoslavian countries.

Most of the Y1s in Sweden were in the 2000s owned by regional transport authorities, rather than by SJ AB, where they have been replaced by Bombardier Itino trains. The last regular line to use these railcars in regular traffic was Kinnekullebanan, run by Västtrafik, in 2019. A number of Y1 railcars were nevertheless stationed at different places around Sweden as reserve trains. The winter/summer tourist service on Inlandsbanan are now the only passenger operator of these railcars, except for several heritage railways. Other companies use Y1 for track maintenance and Trafikverket has converted one Y1 to a conference car.

== Croatia ==
Classified as series 7122 by Croatian Railways, second-hand examples began arriving from Sweden in 1996. As of 2017, there are 35 of them in service. These units have replaced HŽ series 7221 Šinobus units on branch lines. The 7122s are used in Istria and Dalmatia and around Bjelovar, Varaždin, Osijek and Karlovac.

Almost all of the incoming units were painted in standard orange-black livery. However, since 2007, a new, silver, blue and red livery was introduced. Some units are also coloured in silver livery, with a blue stripe on the bottom and modern HŽPP logo above.

The passenger compartment of the train is fully air-conditioned.

== Serbia ==
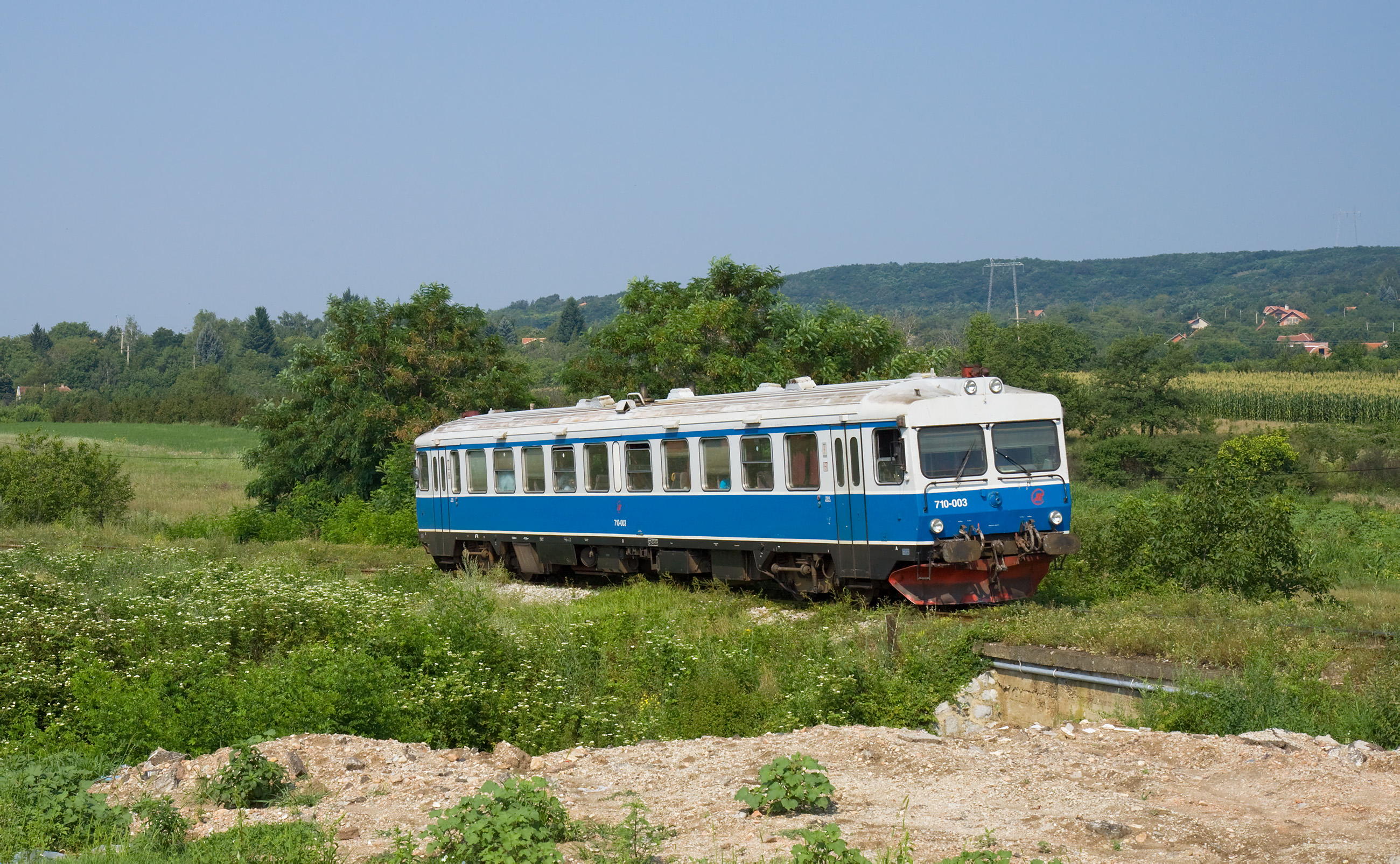
Former Swedish Y1 railcar, now Železnice Srbije class 710, on its way to Niš near Matejevac, Serbia.

Classified as series 710 by Serbian Railways, second-hand examples began arriving from Sweden in 2005. They were all painted in a white, blue, and black livery. Three units have undergone overhaul in the Bjelovar works (where most of the Croatian units are maintained) from 2019. - 2021. and are now painted in the blue-red "swoosh" livery similar to that of Srbija Voz Stadler FLIRT EMU units. The units chiefly work on the railway lines around Zaječar.

== Norway ==
Norges Statsbaner operated three units on the Bratsberg Line, between Porsgrunn and Notodden, from 2000 until August 2015. Purchased second-hand from Swedish State Railways and painted in a more orangey shade of red than that normally applied to NSB stock, the units were not classified according to the standard NSB system, but were referred to as Y1.

== Kosovo ==
A total of four former SJ Y1 railcars (nos 1281, 1304, 1306, 1313) were sold to Kosovo Railways in 2007 for service on local trains between Pristina and Pejë. The cars were renumbered 01, 02, 03, 04 (but still carry their old numbers below the new ones) and are painted in a red and yellow livery.

== Uruguay ==
Five Y1 type railcars (from the Y1R variant refurbished with Volvo engines and fully autoamic transmissions) were sold to the State Railways Administration of Uruguay. Railcars 1273, 1310, 1317, and 1354 are in use on local services around Montevideo (February 2017), with 1333 out of use. In April 2017, seven more were delivered with one to be used for spare parts.

== Gallery ==
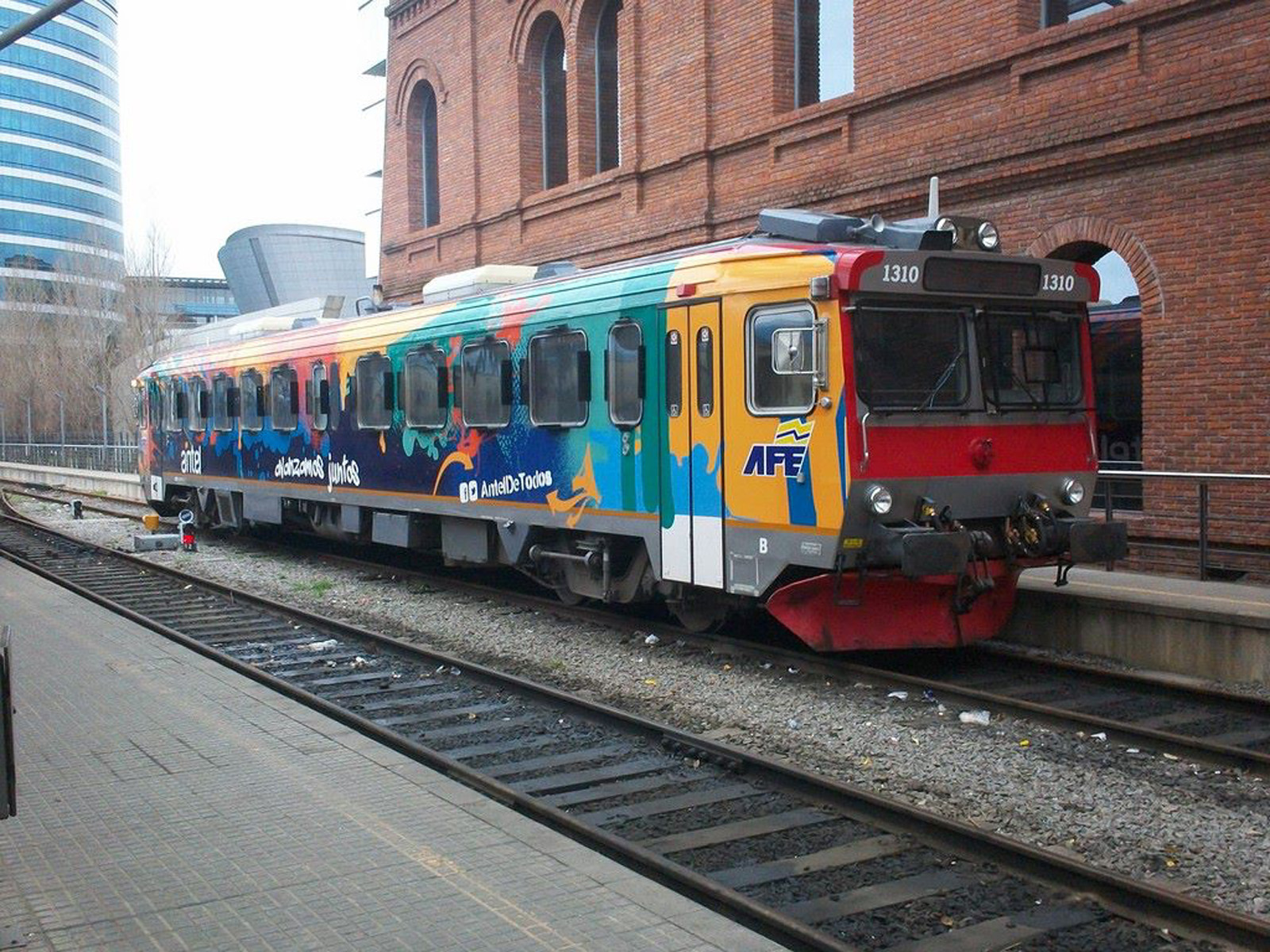
Fiat Y1R DMU on Nueva Terminal de Pasajeros de AFE, Montevideo, Uruguay.

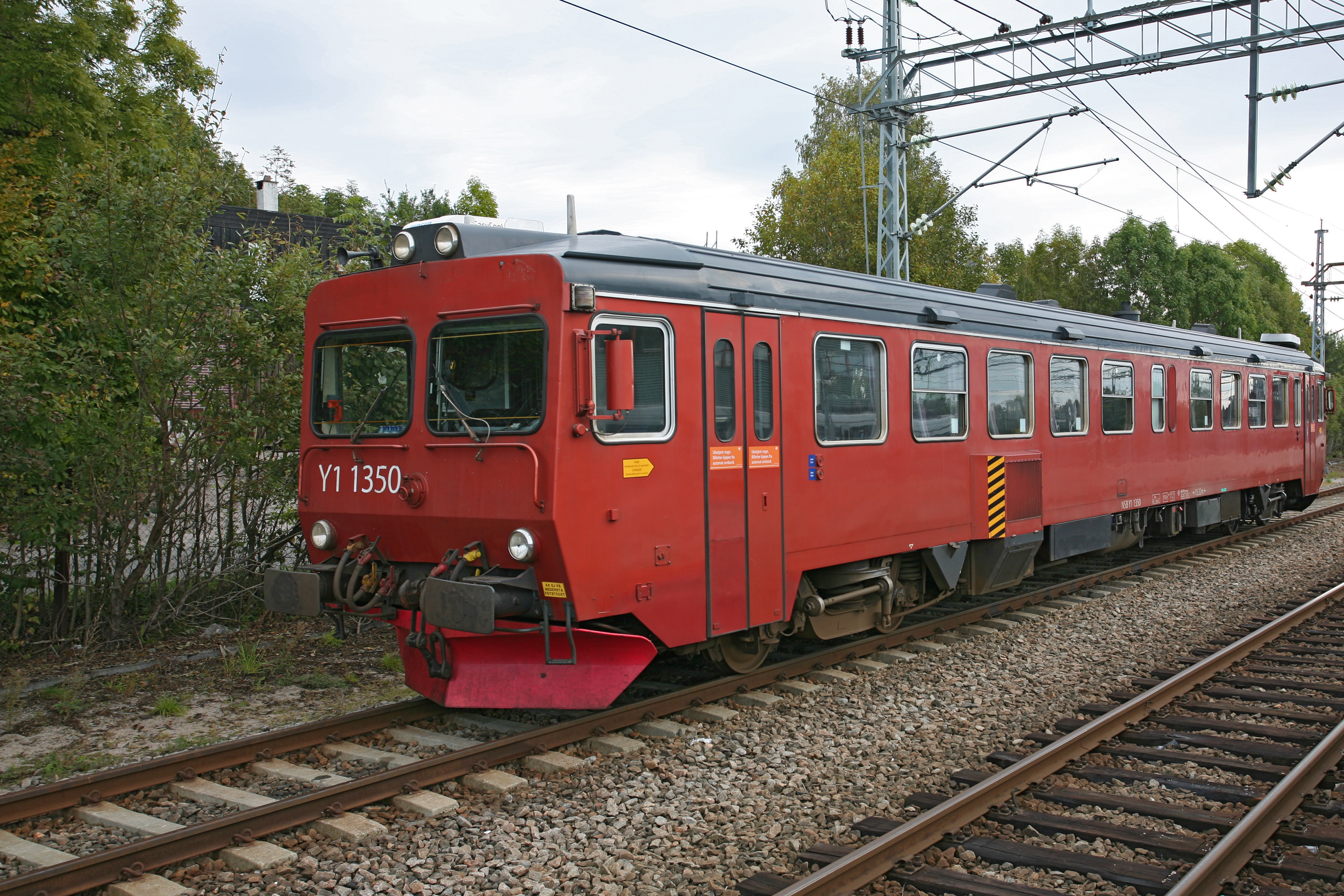
Norwegian Y1 1350 at Skien Railway Station

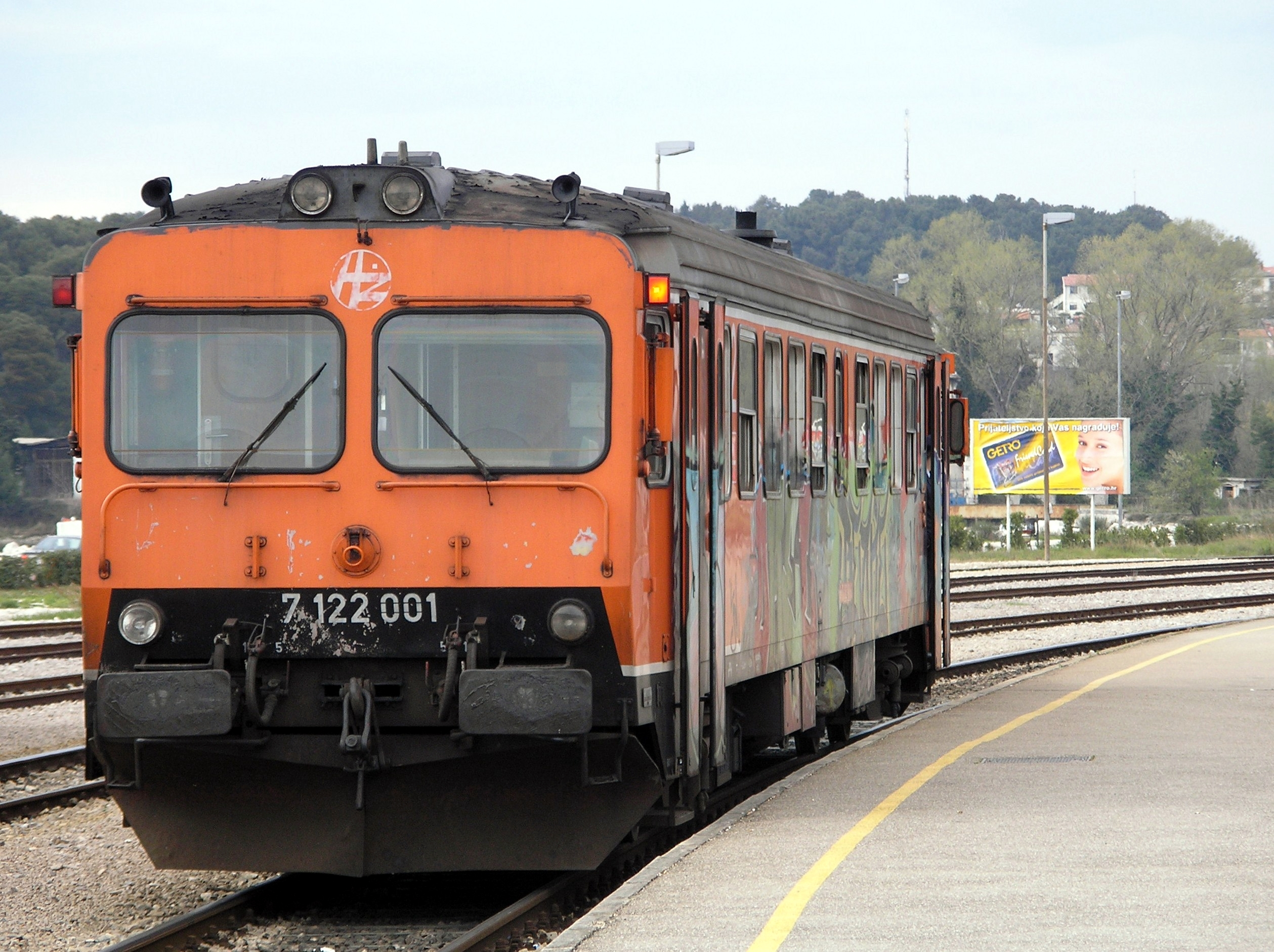
Croatian Y1 in old orange livery

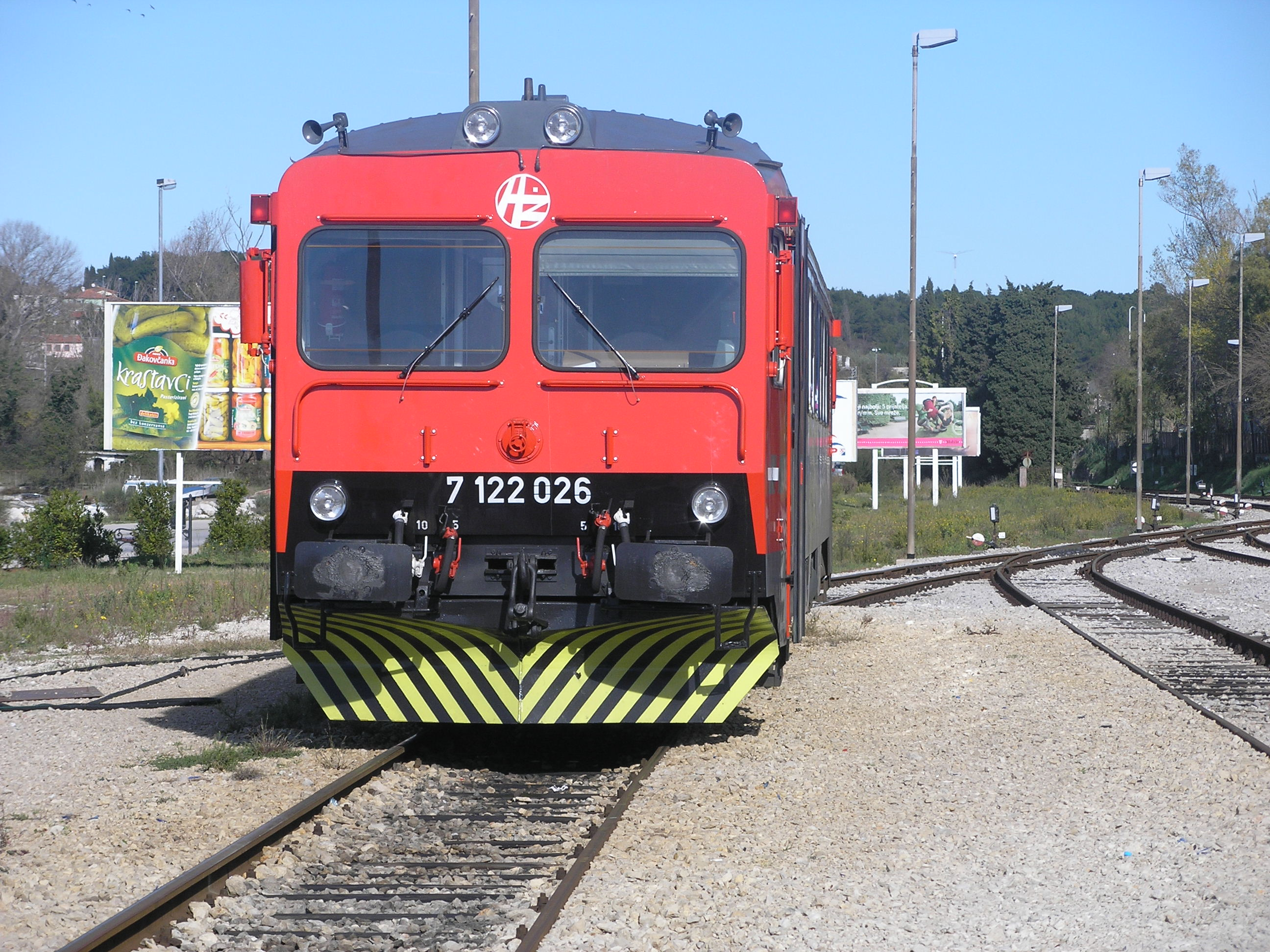
7122 series train in Pula, Croatia

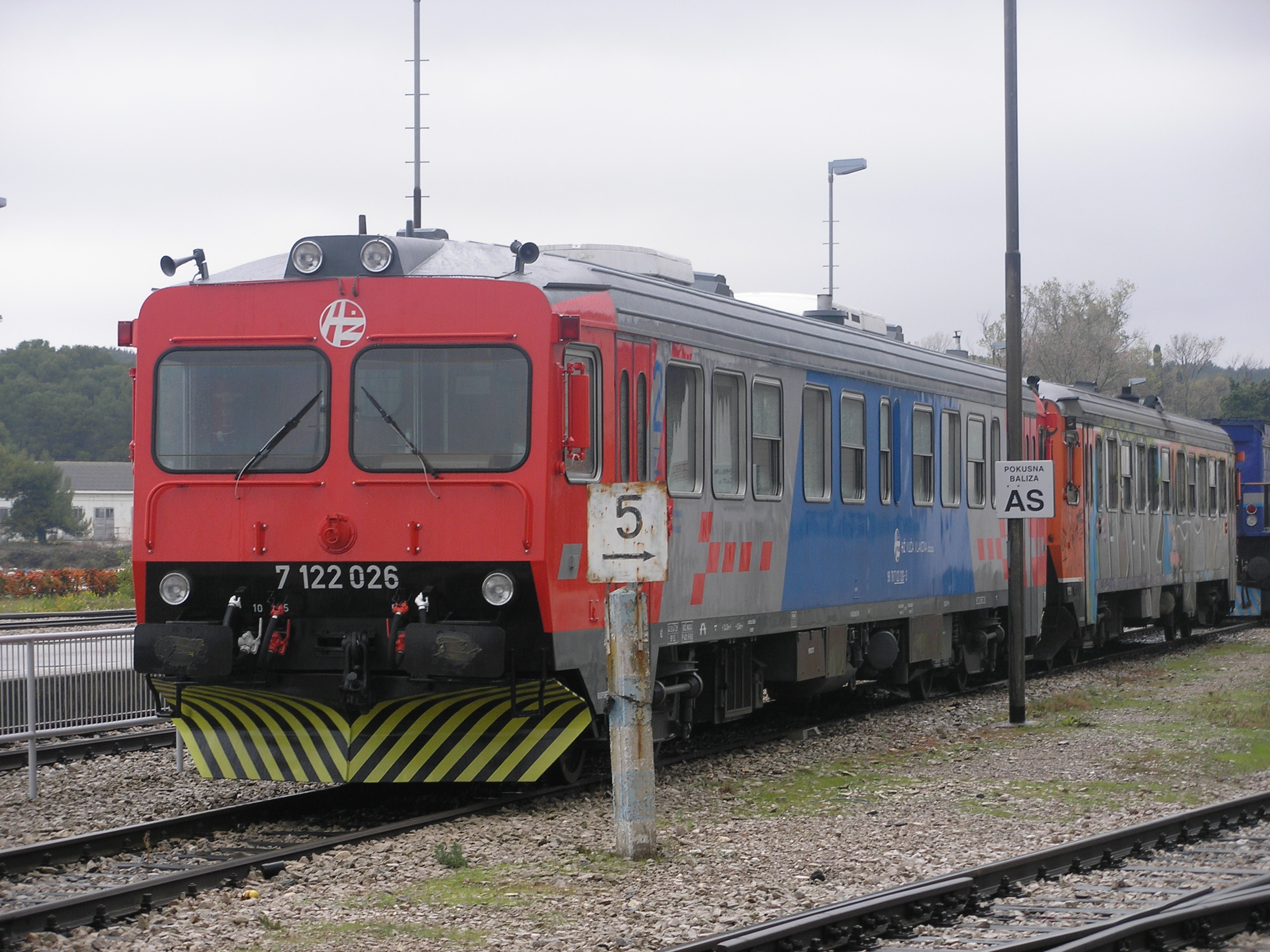
Two coupled units in new HŽ livery

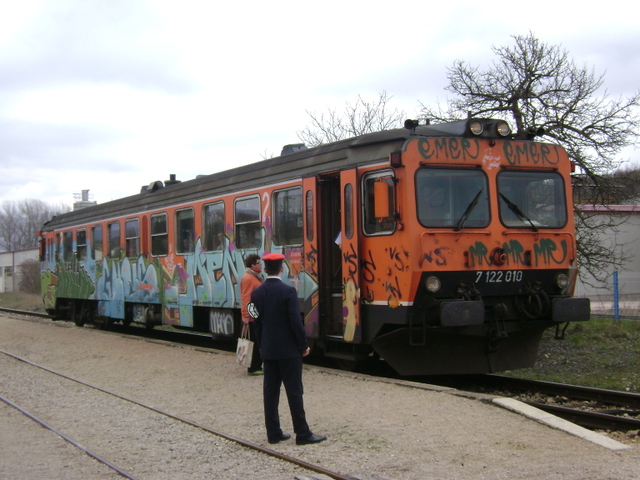
7122 series train in Borut, Croatia

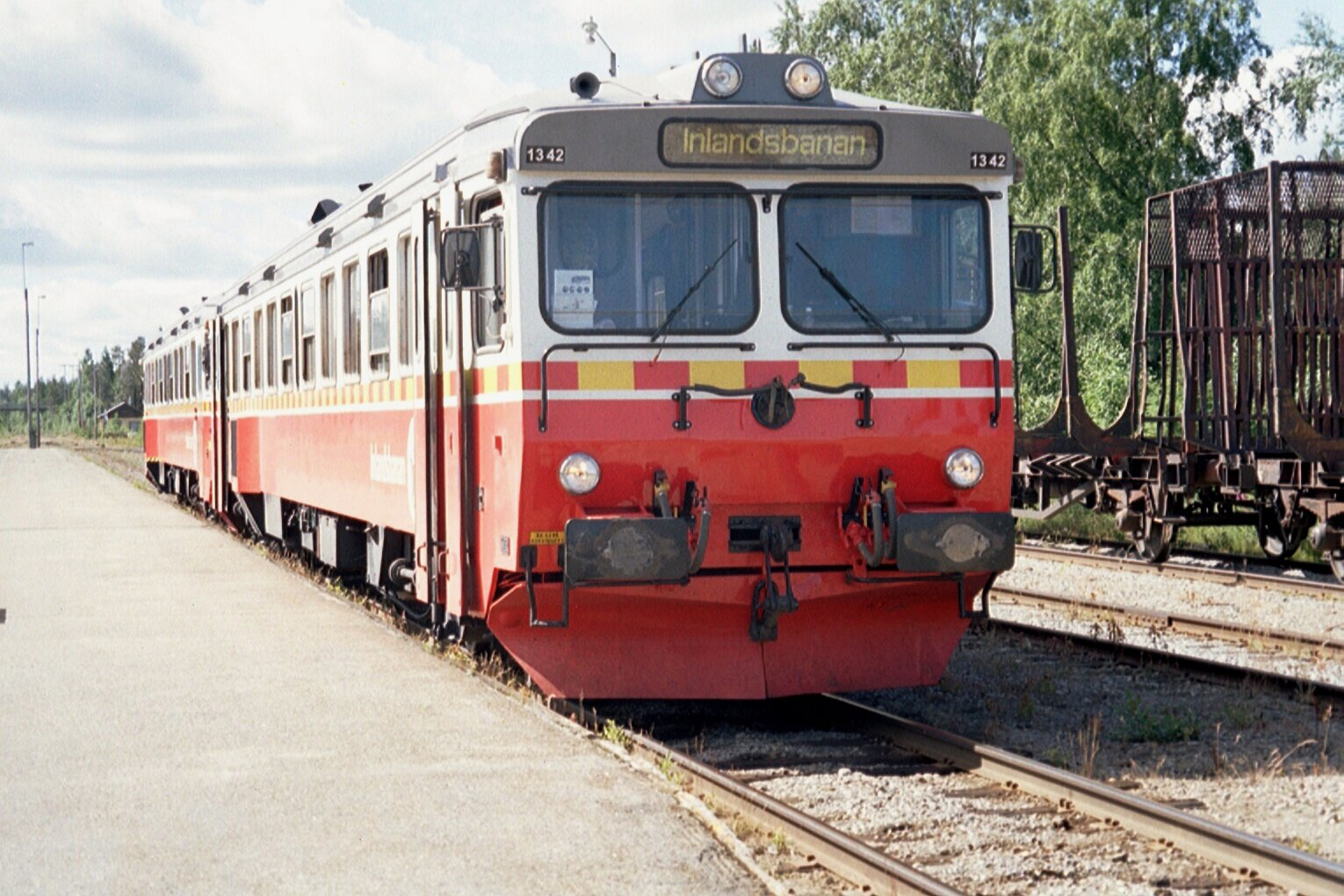
Two coupled units on Inlandsbanan north of Östersund, Sweden

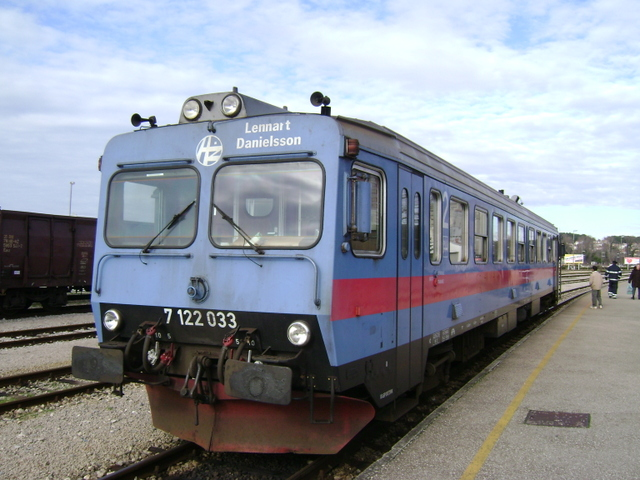
7122 series train in Pula, Croatia

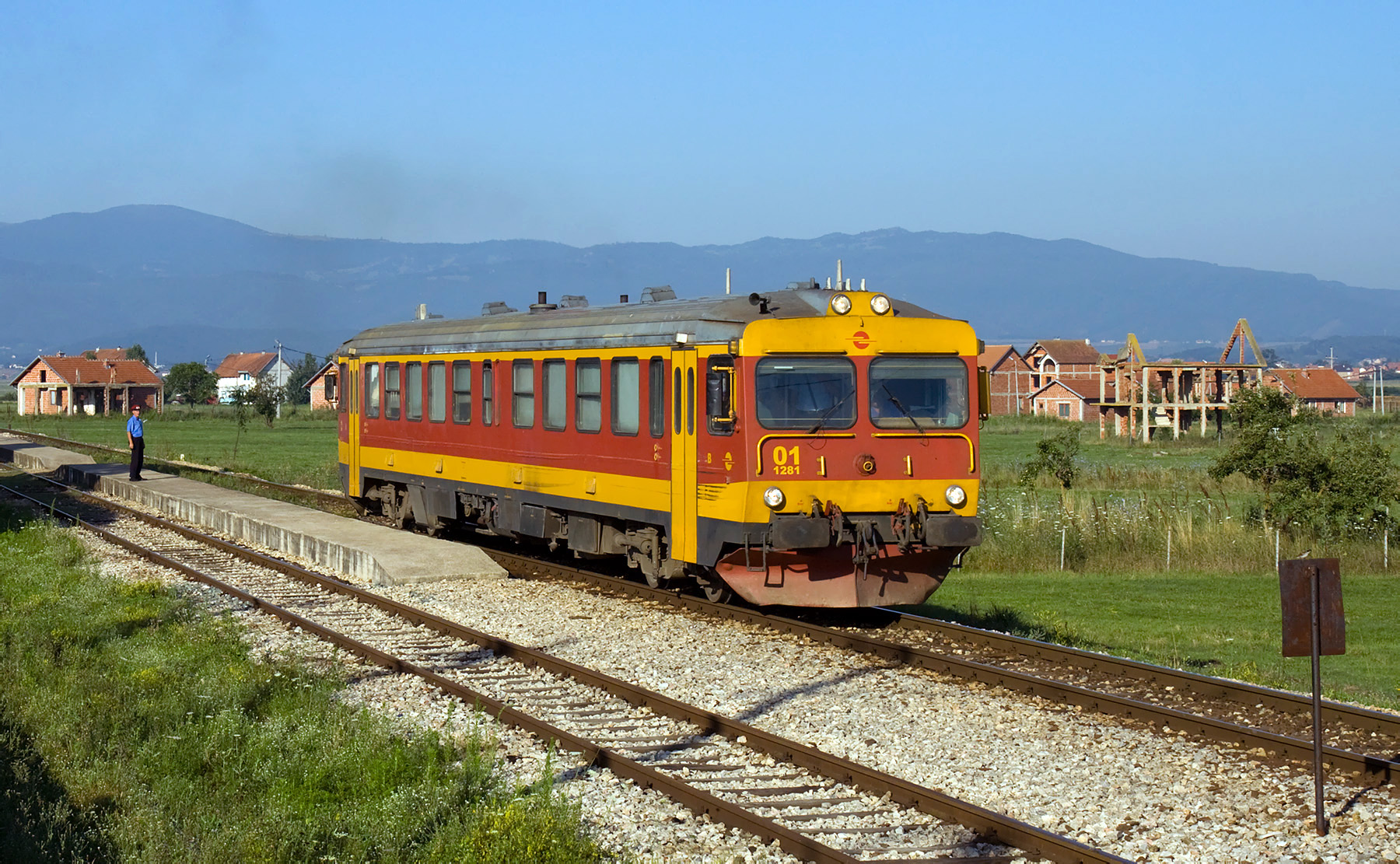
Y1 01 (1281) at Bablak, Kosovo

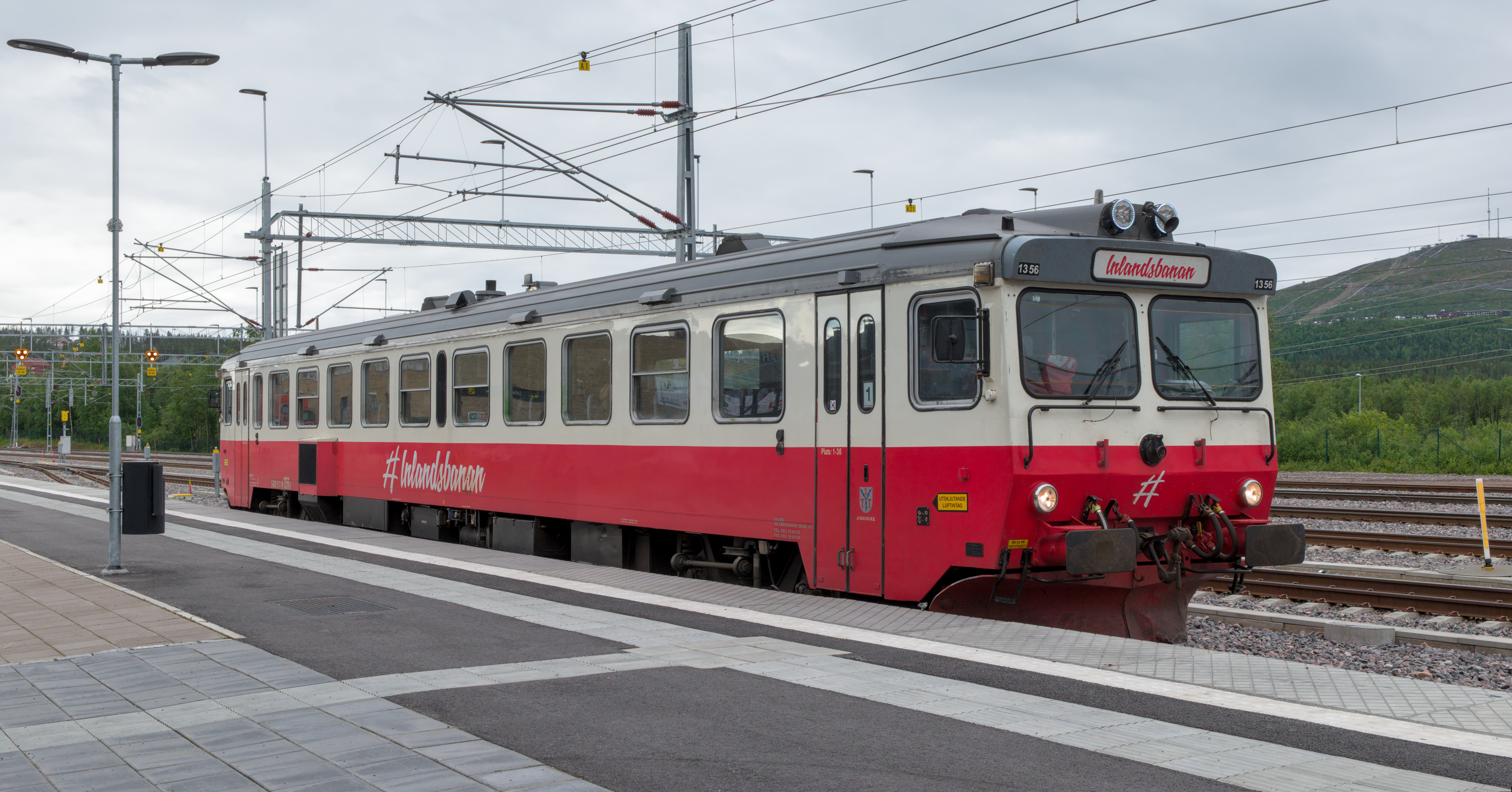
Inlandsbanan Y1 in Gällivare, Sweden
