= Trainkos =

National railway company of Kosovo

- Type: Private
- Industry: Rail transport
- Founded: 2011
- Founder: Government of Kosovo
- Headquarters: Pristina, Kosovo
- Revenue: 1,745,130 (2024)
- Operating income: −435,182 (2024)
- Net income: −488,629 (2024)
- Total assets: 3,255,393 (2024)
- Number of employees: 173 (2024)
- Parent: Government of Kosovo
- Website: http://www.trainkos.com

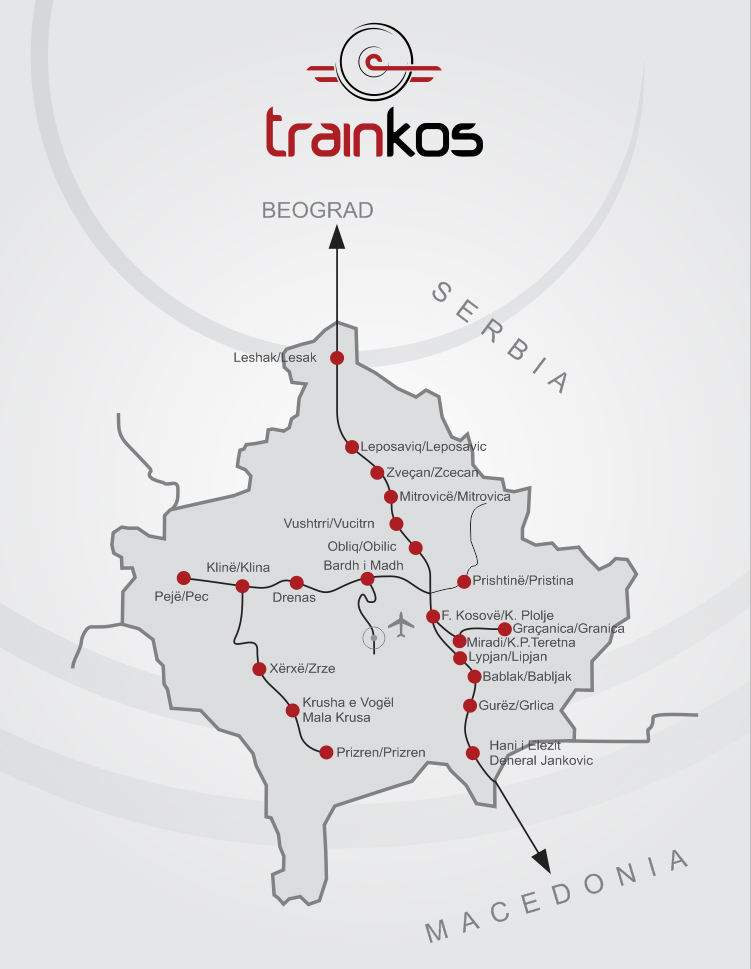
Trainkos

Trainkos is a private railway company based in Kosovo that also serves as the national rail carrier of the country. Established in 2011 alongside Infrakos, the two companies are the successors of Kosovo Railways, a public company that was split up and privatized. Trainkos offers rail service for both passengers and freight.

== History ==
The first railway line in Kosovo was built in 1873 under Turkish guidance for the Compagnie des Chemins de Fer Orientaux (CO), led by Maurice de Hirsch. It started in Thessaloniki, went on north to Skopje and reached Mitrovica.

The railway was used by the Ottomans until 1912, and after the Balkan Wars, it was used by the Serbian Railways until 1918, and then the Yugoslav Railways between 1918 and 1992. Serbian Railways stopped their operations in Kosovo after the Kosovo War in 1999 and then UNMIK established the public company Kosovo Railways.

After Kosovo's declaration of independence, Kosovo Railways came under management by the Government of Kosovo, which split up the company in order to avoid monopoly and privatized it in 2011. Now Trainkos manages passenger and freight travel, while Infrakos manages the rail network.

== Rail network ==
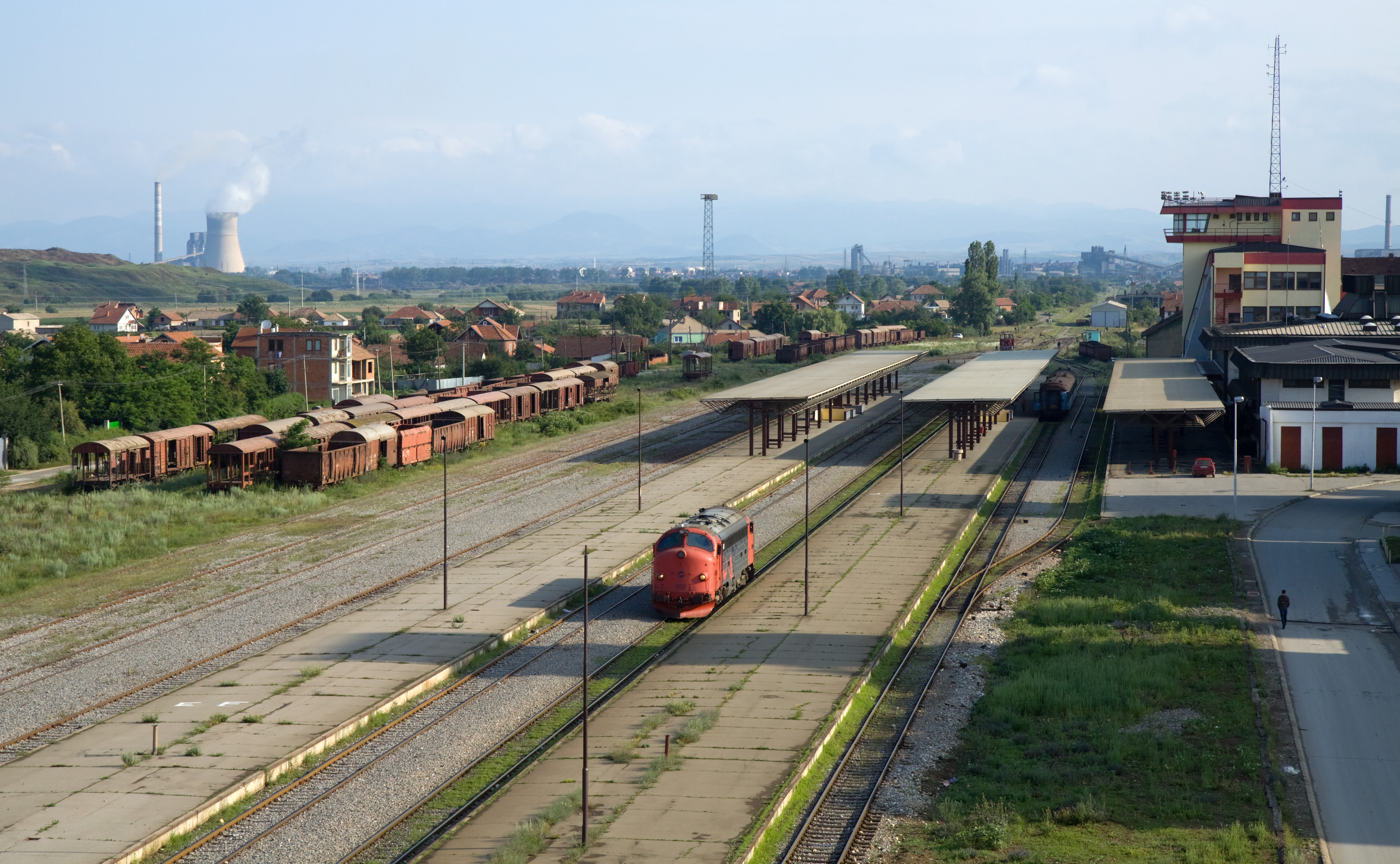
Fushë Kosova station

Trainkos operates passenger and freight railway services on the railway network managed by Infrakos. The railway network in Kosovo has a total length of 335.079 km (208 mi), excluding station and industrial tracks. The network is non-electrified and uses the standard gauge of 1,435 mm (4 ft 8 1/2 in).

The main railway route through Kosovo runs from Leshak at the border with Serbia through Mitrovicë, Fushë Kosovë, Pristina and Ferizaj to Hani i Elezit at the border with North Macedonia. This route forms the Kosovo section of Rail Route 10, which connects Kraljevo in Serbia with Skopje in North Macedonia.

Other railway lines branch from the main route, including the lines from Fushë Kosovë to Peja and from Klinë to Prizren. Infrakos's railway maintenance network also includes the Fushë Kosovë–Bardhosh–Livadh and Fushë Kosovë–Baincë lines.

The railway network has international connections with Serbia and North Macedonia. Passenger services currently operate between Pristina and Peja, while the southern section of Route 10 between Fushë Kosovë and Hani i Elezit has been affected by the ongoing rehabilitation works. The Route 10 rehabilitation project covers approximately 148 km (92 mi) between the Serbian and North Macedonian borders and is being implemented in three phases.

=== Rail links with adjacent countries ===
- Albania - no connection
- Montenegro - no connection
- North Macedonia - closed (undergoing modernisation/rehabilitation)
- Serbia - closed

== Recent investments ==
=== Route 10 rehabilitation ===
The rehabilitation of Rail Route 10 is the largest railway infrastructure investment in Kosovo. The route runs from Hani i Elezit on the border with North Macedonia through Fushë Kosovë and Mitrovicë to Leshak on the border with Serbia. The section within Kosovo is approximately 148–149 km long and forms part of the extension of the Trans-European Transport Network (TEN-T) into the Western Balkans.

The rehabilitation programme is divided into three phases. Phase 1 covers the section between Fushë Kosovë and the North Macedonian border at Hani i Elezit. Phase 2 covers the section between Fushë Kosovë and Mitrovicë, while Phase 3 covers the section between Mitrovicë and the Serbian border at Leshak.

The European Investment Bank has provided €80 million in loans for the Route 10 rehabilitation project, with €42 million signed in 2015 and a further €38 million in 2022. The project is promoted by Infrakos.

As of the end of 2025, the rehabilitation programme was still under implementation. Infrakos reported that Phase 1 had reached approximately 81% overall progress according to an independent assessment, with completion projected for around September 2027, subject to the resolution of outstanding technical and contractual issues. Phase 2 was also still under construction. The WBIF currently lists Phase 1 with an expected completion date of December 2027 and Phase 2 with an expected completion date of December 2028.

Phase 3, between Mitrovicë and the Serbian border, remains in the preparation stage. Detailed design and tender preparation have been supported through the Western Balkans Investment Framework, while financing for the construction works is being developed separately.

== Operations ==
=== Passenger traffic ===
Trainkos operates passenger services on several domestic and international routes. Its regular passenger services include trains between Pristina and Peja, trains between Fushë Kosovë and Hani i Elezit, and the international service between Pristina and Skopje in North Macedonia.

The Pristina–Peja route is operated by both local and InterCity services. Trainkos also used to operate Local and Freedom of Movement services between Fushë Kosovë and Hani i Elezit.

Trainkos publishes separate timetables for the Pristina–Peja and Pristina–Skopje routes. The international Pristina–Skopje service operates via Fushë Kosovë and Hani i Elezit before crossing the border into North Macedonia.

=== Freight traffic ===
Trainkos provides domestic and international freight transport and organises the movement of different types of goods, including containerised freight, through its domestic and international partners. The company maintains a freight transport department responsible for organising and operating freight trains on the railway network.

Rail freight customs facilities are available at several locations, including Hani i Elezit, Miradi, Peja and Pristina.

Trainkos's freight customers have included industrial and commercial companies in Kosovo, including NewCo Ferronikeli, Kosova Thëngjilli, HIB Petrol and M&Sillosi.

=== International traffic ===
Kosovo's international railway traffic has been affected by infrastructure rehabilitation and the political situation surrounding its northern border. Trainkos reported that international railway transport was completely interrupted in 2024, with the route through North Macedonia suspended because of the rehabilitation of Rail Route 10, while international traffic through the northern border remained closed.

The international passenger route between Pristina and Skopje has historically provided Kosovo's principal international passenger railway connection. Trainkos continues to publish a Pristina–Skopje timetable, although the service has been subject to suspension during the rehabilitation of the railway line between Fushë Kosovë and Hani i Elezit.

=== Northern Kosovo ===
The railway line north of Mitrovica forms the northern section of Rail Route 10 and extends to the Serbian border at Lešak. Following the Kosovo War and the subsequent political division of railway administration, the section north of Mitrovica was not administered by Kosovo's railway authorities and remained under the control of Serbian railway structures.

Regular railway services on the northern section have not operated since 2020. The line between Mitrovica and Lešak has consequently remained closed to regular railway traffic, although the infrastructure remains physically connected to the railway network towards Serbia.

In May September 2026, Infrakos announced that it had taken full management control of its railway assets in northern Kosovo, which had previously been occupied or controlled by Serbian parallel structures. Infrakos placed official signs and markings at the stations of Zvečan, Leposavić, Lešak and Slatina. The takeover concerned the management and administration of railway infrastructure and did not constitute the resumption of railway services.

Infrakos has identified the Mitrovica–Lešak section as part of the planned rehabilitation of Rail Route 10. The section is intended to restore the northern connection of Kosovo's railway network with Serbia, although rehabilitation and the resumption of international railway services remain subject to further infrastructure works and other conditions.

== Rolling stock ==
The rolling stock of Trainkos consists largely of locomotives and passenger coaches inherited from or acquired from railway operators in the former Yugoslavia and elsewhere in Europe. Following the Kosovo War, international organisations and European countries provided locomotives, railcars and passenger coaches to help restore railway operations in Kosovo.

=== Locomotives ===
Trainkos uses diesel locomotives for passenger, freight and shunting services. Its passenger locomotive fleet includes two Class 645 locomotives, while its freight fleet includes Class 661 locomotives, a Vossloh G 1700-2 BB and a modernised EMD JT38CW-DC. Trainkos also operates MDD3 shunting locomotives.

Number	Type	Former identity	Use	Status
2620 005	Class 645	Former JŽ 645-033 / HŽ 2044-031	Passenger	Operational
2620 016	Class 645	Former JŽ 645-018 / HŽ 2044-010	Combined transport	Operational
2640 007	Class 661	Former JŽ 661-228	Freight	Operational
2640 008	Class 661	Former JŽ 661-231	Freight	Operational
2760 009	Vossloh G 1700-2 BB	—	Freight	Under repair/assessment
2640 010	JT38CW-DC	Modernised locomotive	Freight	Out of service
2760 001	MDD3	—	Shunting	Operational
2760 002	MDD3	—	Shunting	Out of service

Trainkos's 2026 Business Plan records 2620 005 and 2620 016 as operational locomotives, while 2640 007 and 2640 008 were operational in freight service. Locomotive 2640 010 was out of service, while locomotive 2760 009 had been subject to procedures concerning its repair and return to service.

=== Diesel railcars ===
Trainkos has four former SJ Y1 diesel railcars, numbered 5800 001 through 5800 004. The vehicles were built in 1987 and are currently out of service.

Number	Type	Former identity	Built	Status
5800 001	Y1	Former Swedish State Railways	1987	Out of service
5800 002	Y1	Former Swedish State Railways	1987	Out of service
5800 003	Y1	Former Swedish State Railways	1987	Out of service
5800 004	Y1	Former Swedish State Railways	1987	Out of service

=== Former NoHAB locomotives ===
Four former NSB Di 3 diesel locomotives were transferred to Kosovo from Norway in 2001 as part of international assistance following the Kosovo War. The locomotives were numbered 005, 006, 007 and 008 and were used by UNMIK Railways and later the Kosovo Railways and Trainkos, including passenger and freight services. Locomotive 007 was the last of the four to remain operational, being withdrawn in 2017 after reaching its mileage limit.

Locomotives 006, 007 and 008 were subsequently scrapped in 2021. Locomotive 005, formerly NSB Di 3a 619, is the only one of the four to have survived. It is preserved in Kosovo and has been associated with a proposed transfer to Bahnpark Augsburg in Germany.

=== Carriages ===
Trainkos has ten passenger coaches in its current fleet. The coaches were built between 1966 and 1975. Several have undergone intermediate overhauls, while others require further maintenance. Four coaches were stationed at Hani i Elezit because of the closure of the railway line towards North Macedonia.

Number	Type	Built	Status
50 00 84 35 022-1	Passenger coach	1966–1975	Operational; intermediate overhaul required
50 00 23 35 023-4	Passenger coach	1966–1975	At Hani i Elezit; intermediate overhaul completed
50 00 23 35 024-2	Passenger coach	1966–1975	At Hani i Elezit; intermediate overhaul completed
50 00 23 35 025-9	Passenger coach	1966–1975	Out of service; used for spare parts
50 00 23 35 026-7	Passenger coach	1966–1975	Operational; intermediate overhaul required
50 00 84 35 027-0	Passenger coach	1966–1975	At Hani i Elezit; intermediate overhaul completed
50 00 84 35 028-8	Passenger coach	1966–1975	At Hani i Elezit; intermediate overhaul completed
50 00 84 35 029-9	Passenger coach	1966–1975	Operational; intermediate overhaul required
50 00 23 35 030-9	Passenger coach	1966–1975	At Hani i Elezit; intermediate overhaul completed
50 00 31 35 031-6	Passenger coach	1966–1975	Operational; intermediate overhaul required

== Pictures ==
=== Locomotives ===
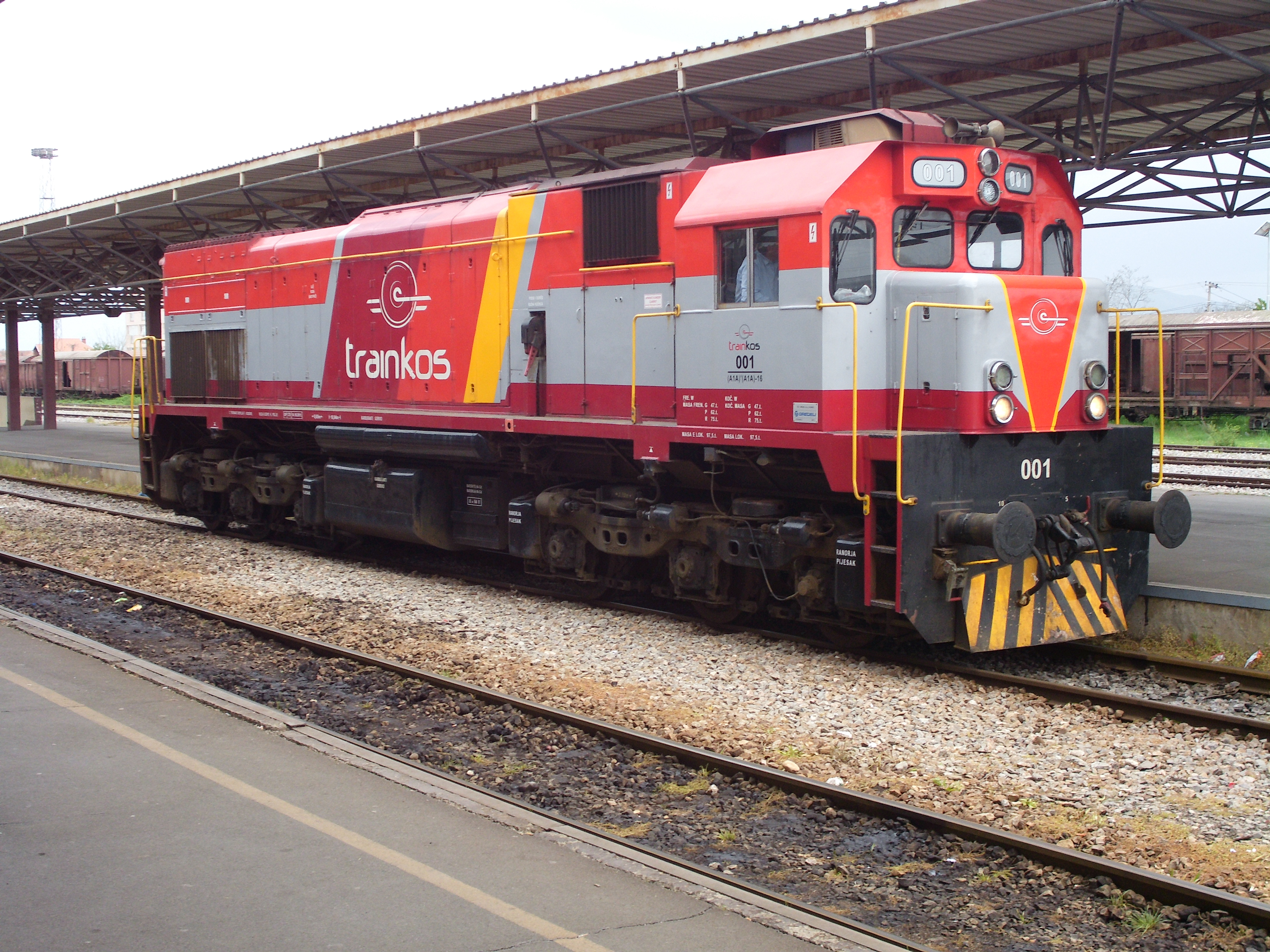
001, HŽ 2044-031

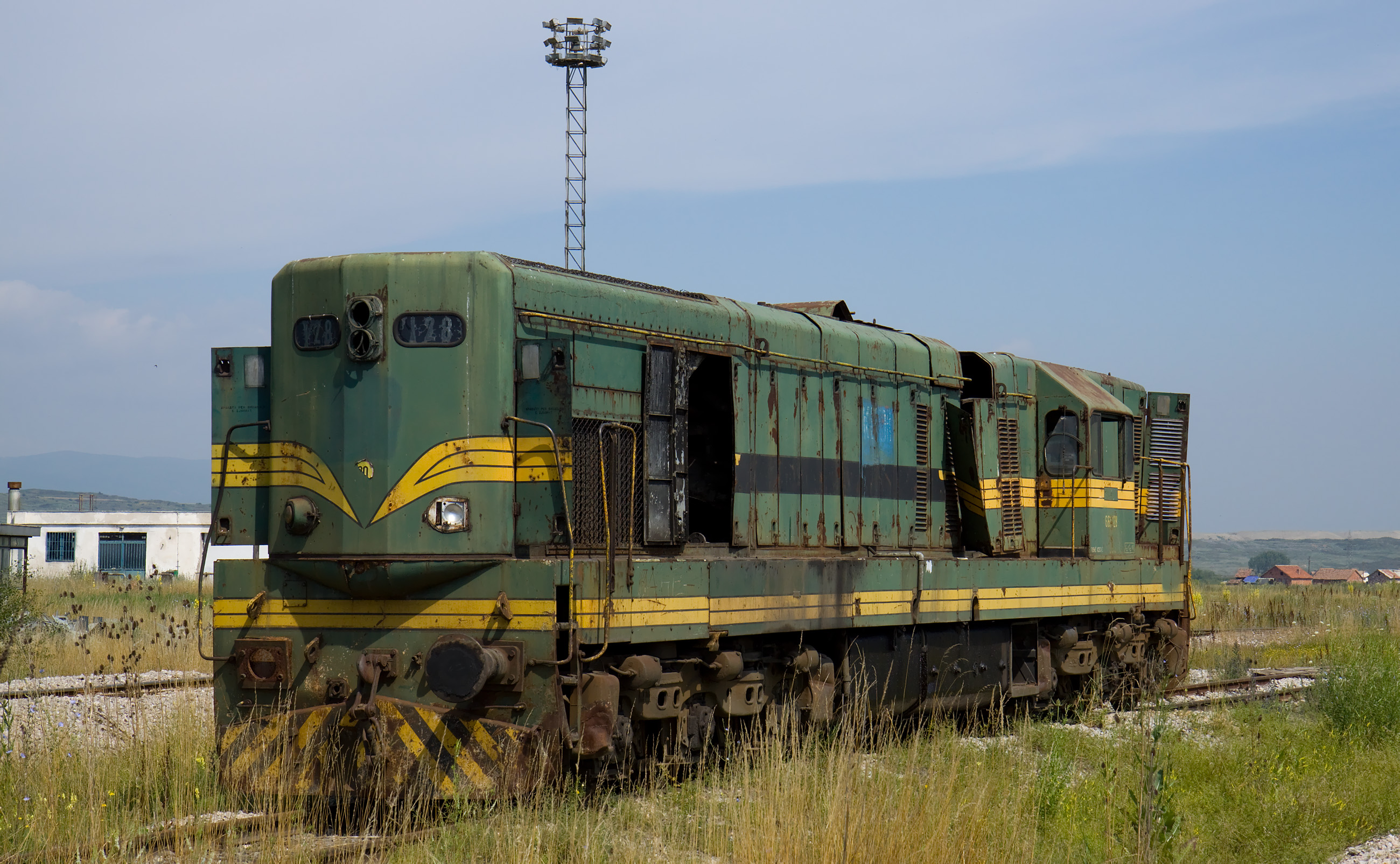
001 (formerly), JŽ 661 128

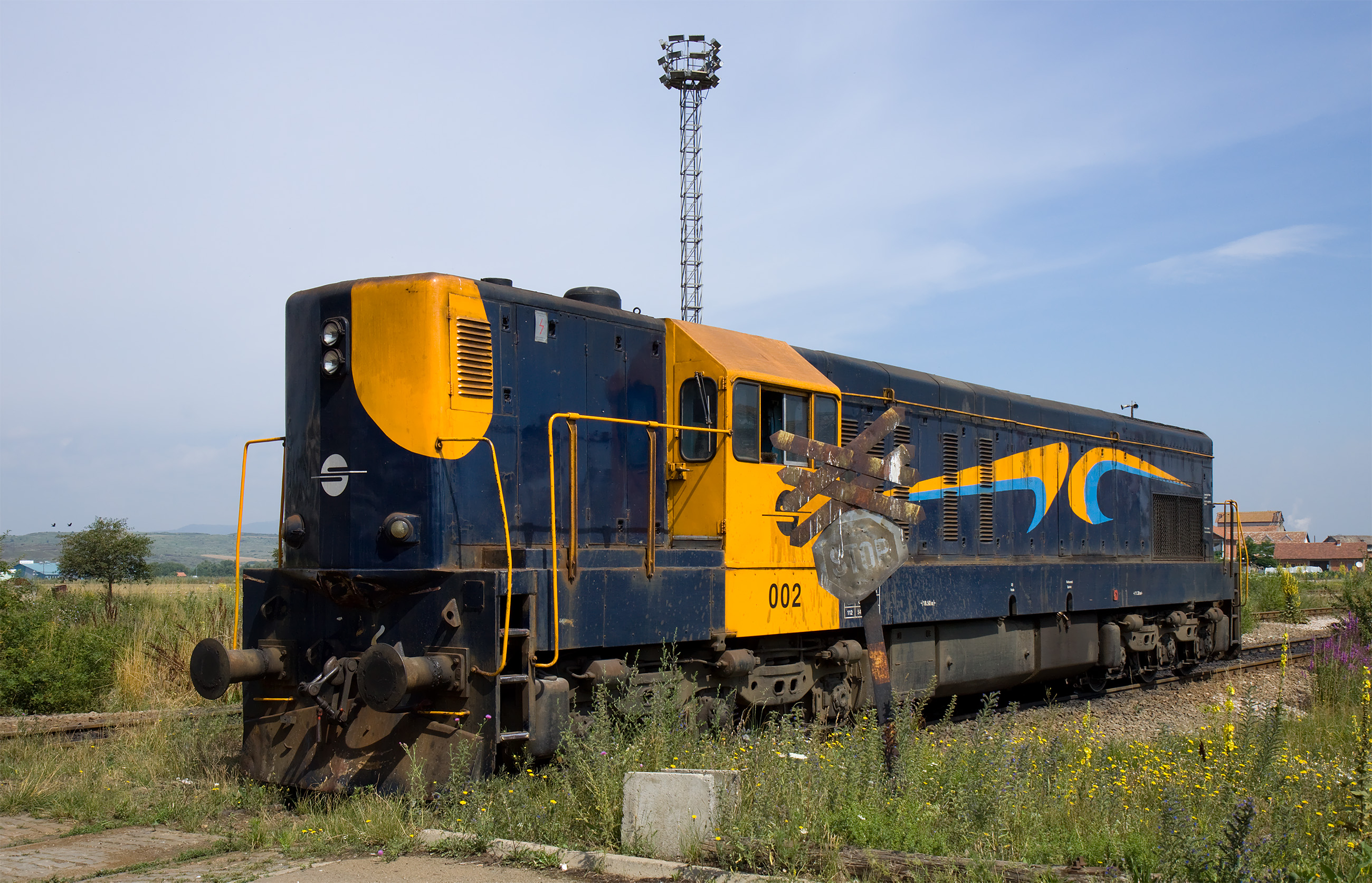
002, JŽ 661 132

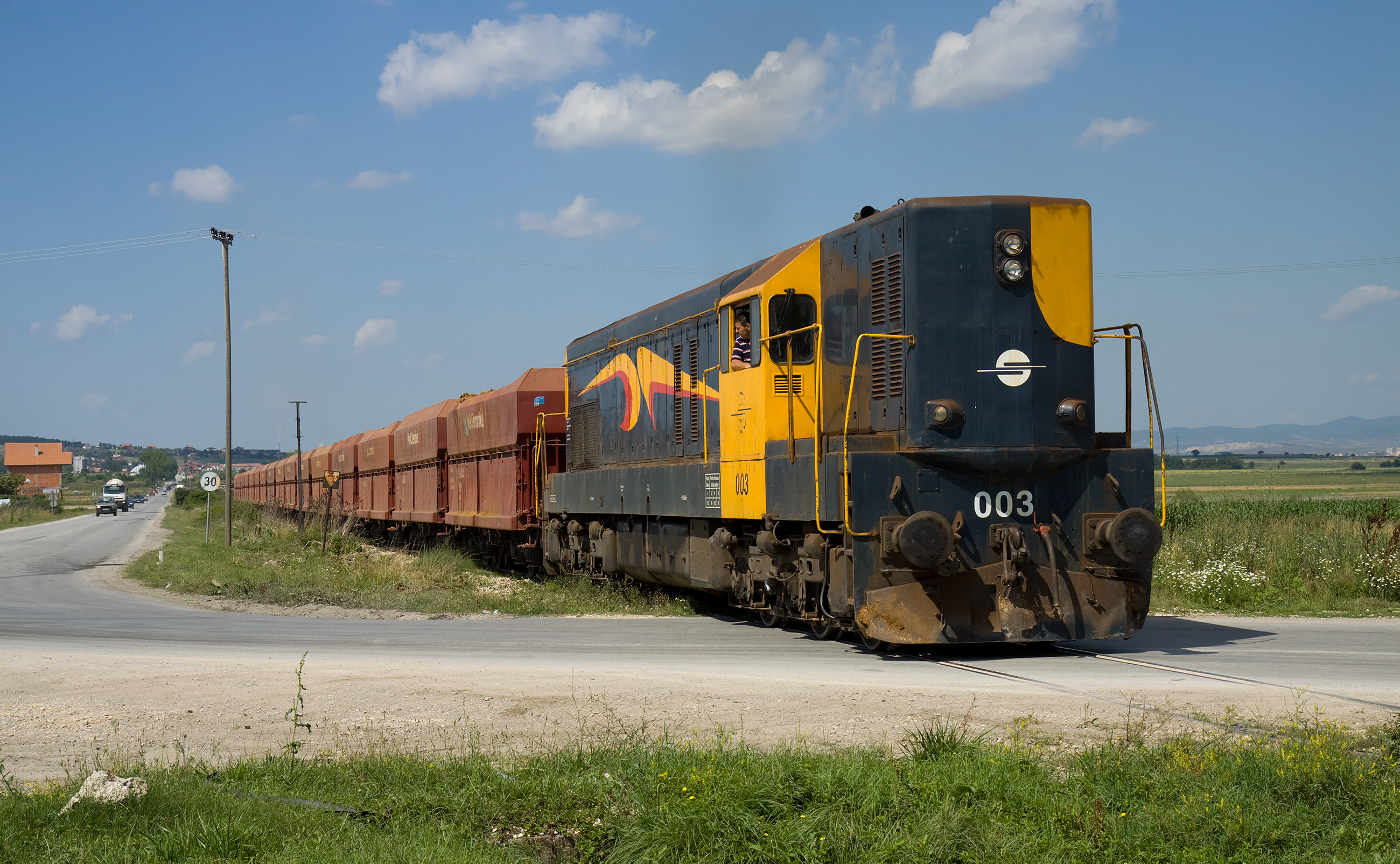
003, JŽ 661 228

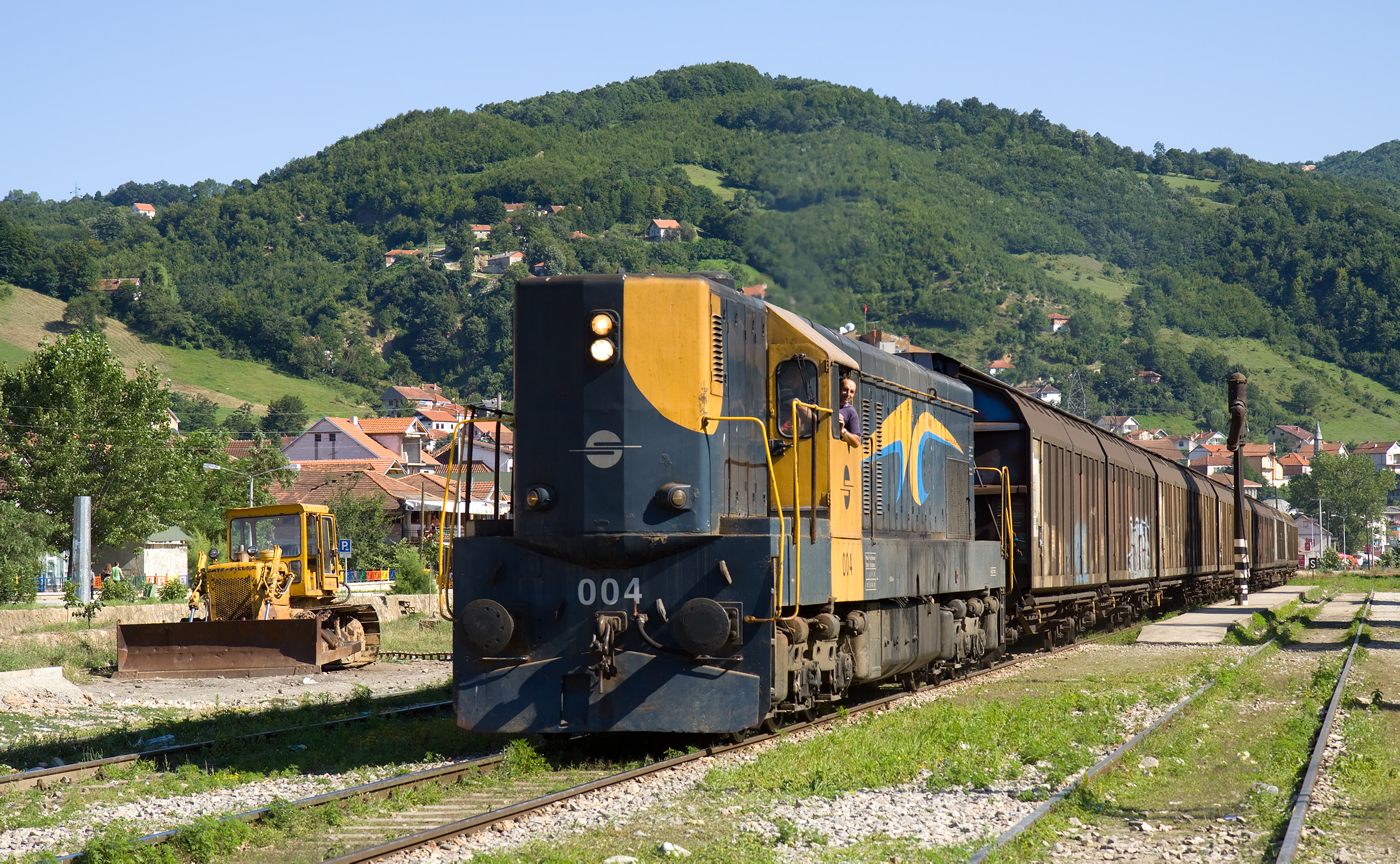
004, JŽ 661 231

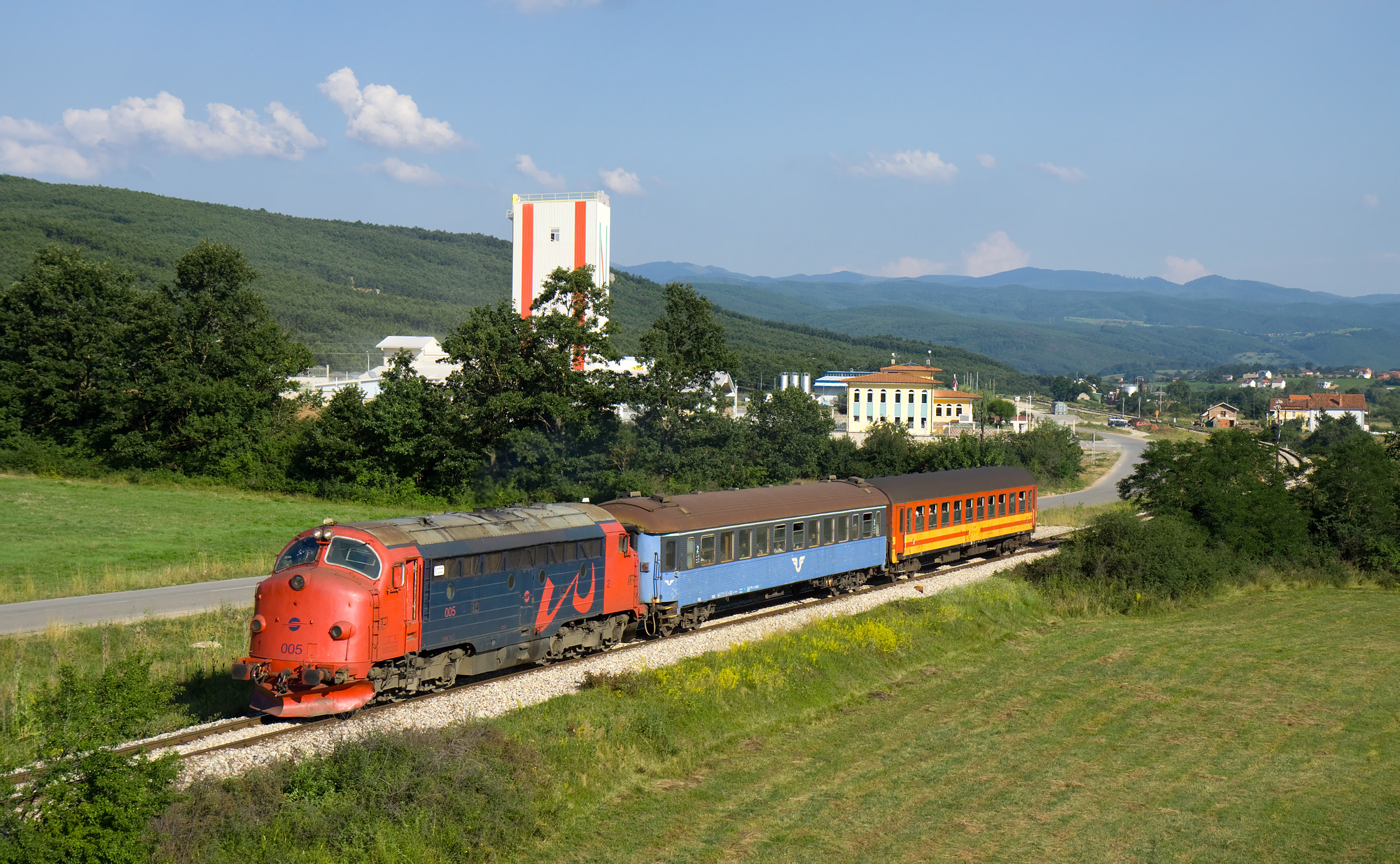
005, NSB Di 3a 619

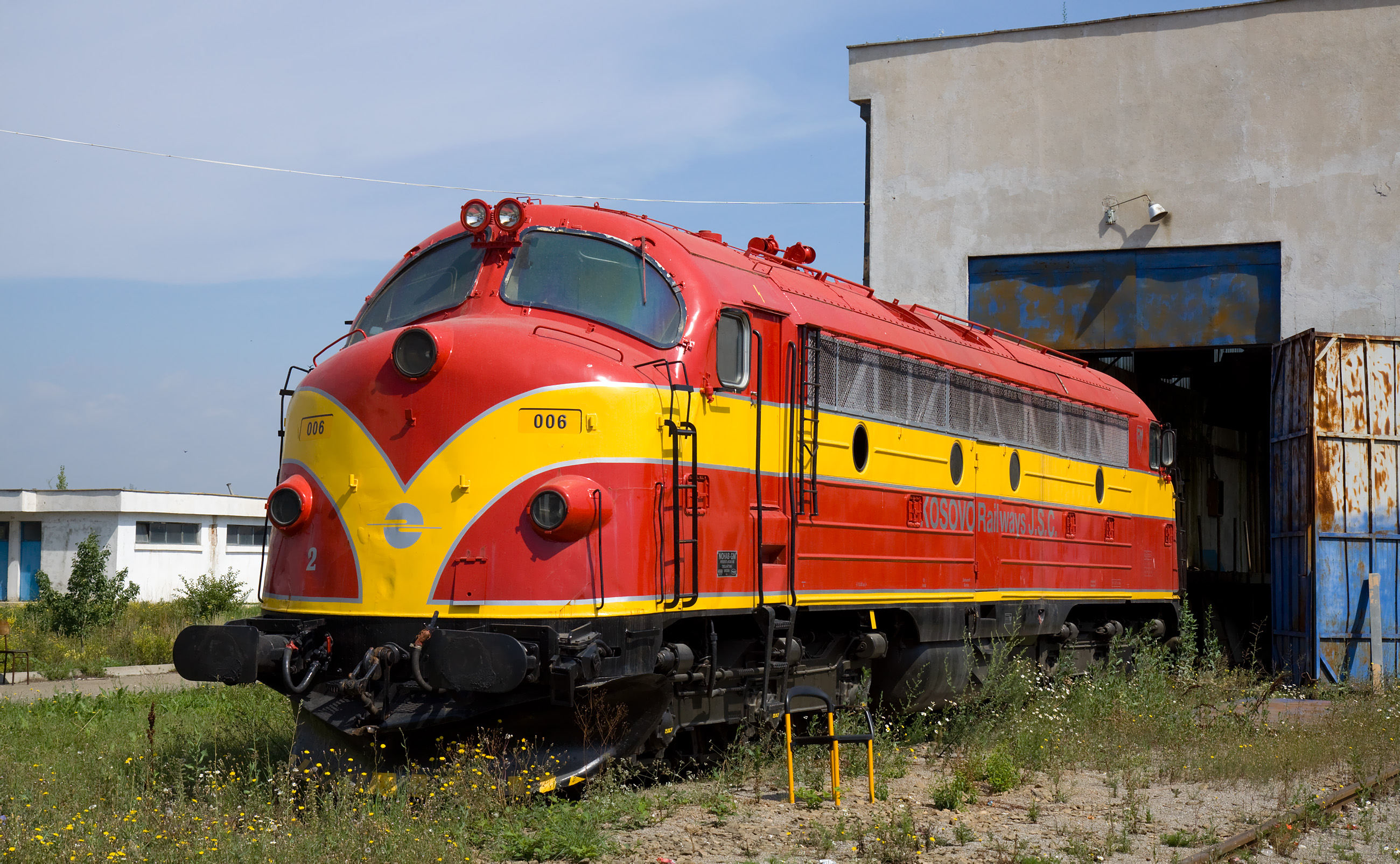
006, NSB Di 3a 633

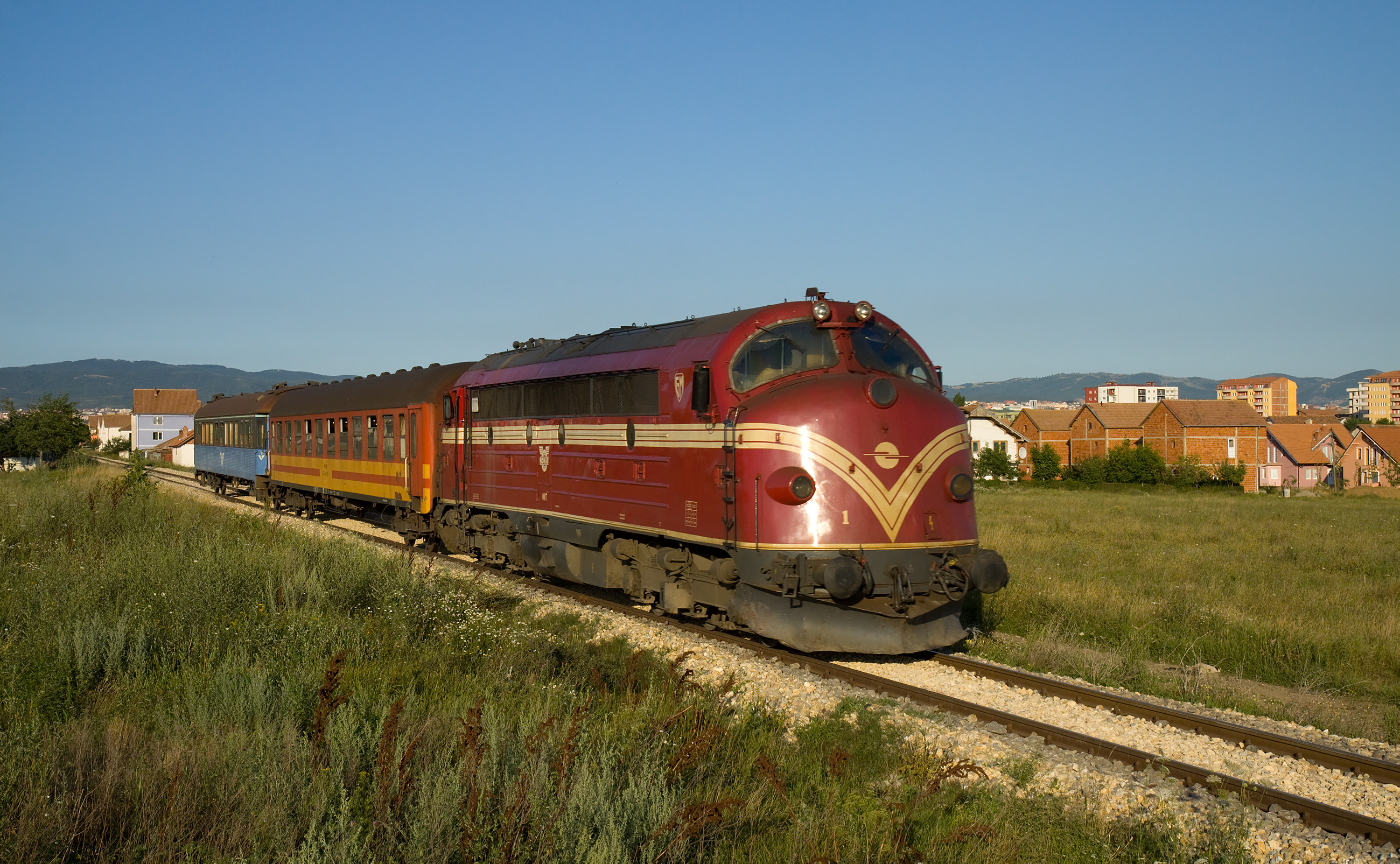
007, NSB Di 3b 641

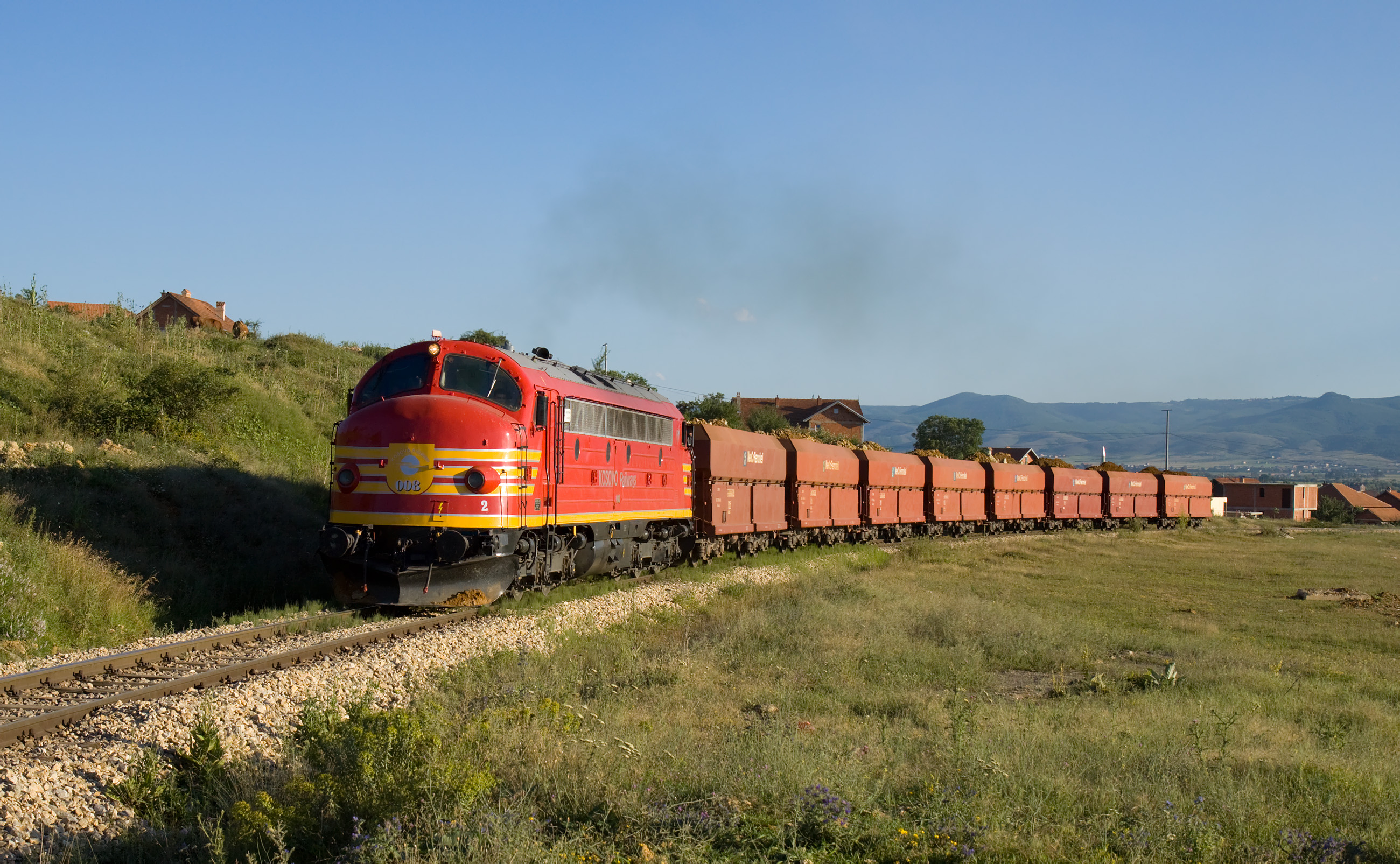
008, NSB Di 3b 643

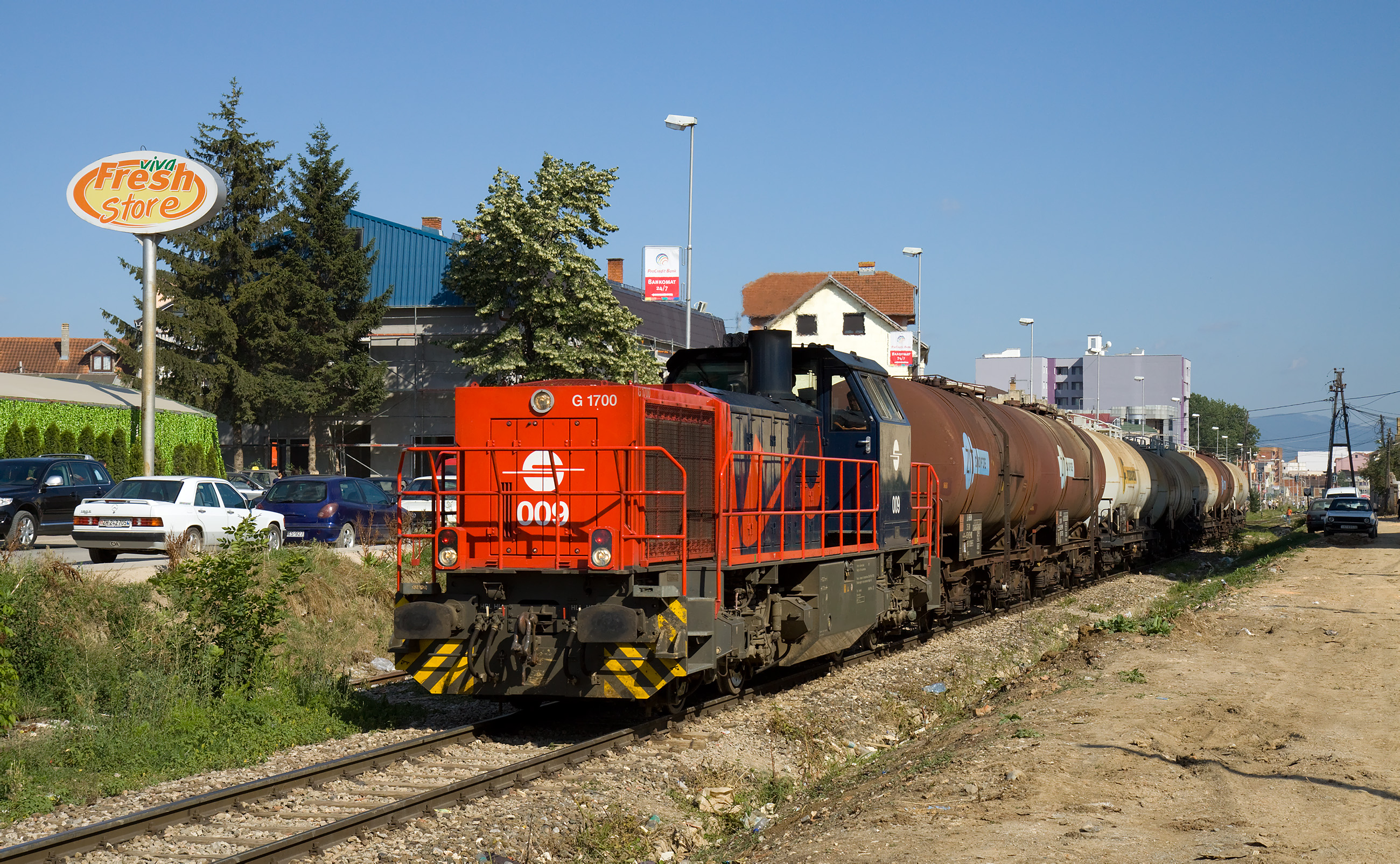
009, Vossloh G 1700

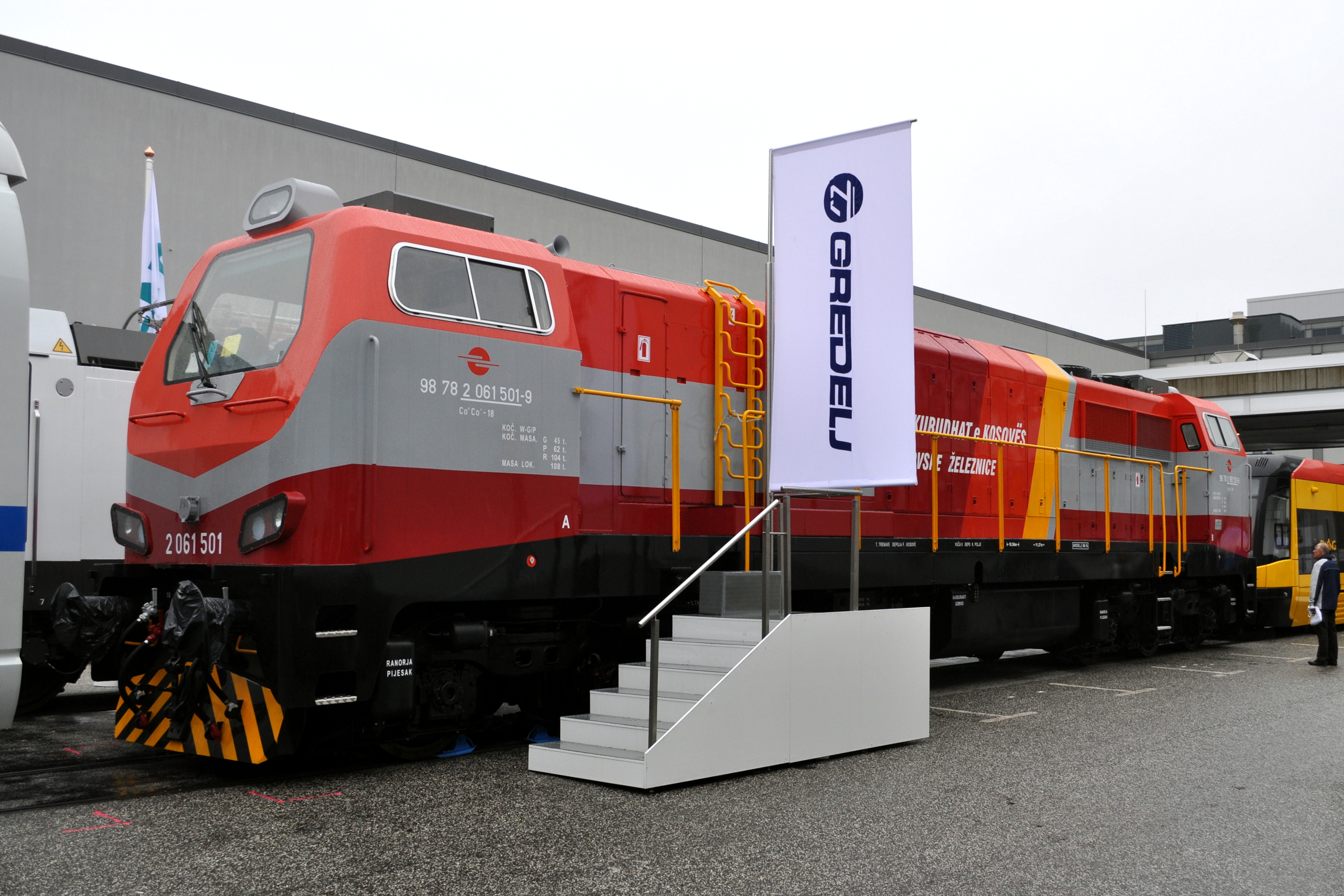
010, JT38CW-DC

== See also ==
- Transport in Kosovo
- Yugoslav Railways
