= Lešak =

Lešak Лешак Leshak
- Village
- Location within Kosovo
- Coordinates: 43°10′01″N 20°44′31″E
- Location: Kosovo
- District: Mitrovica
- Municipality: Leposavić

Population (2024)
  - Total: 330

Lešak (Serbian Cyrillic: Лешак) or Leshak (Albanian definite form: Leshaku), is a town settlement of Leposavić in northern Kosovo. It has population of 2,180, with an ethnic Serb majority.

Lešak was, along with the Leposavić municipality, ceded to SAP Kosovo in 1959.
