= EMD GT22HW-2 =

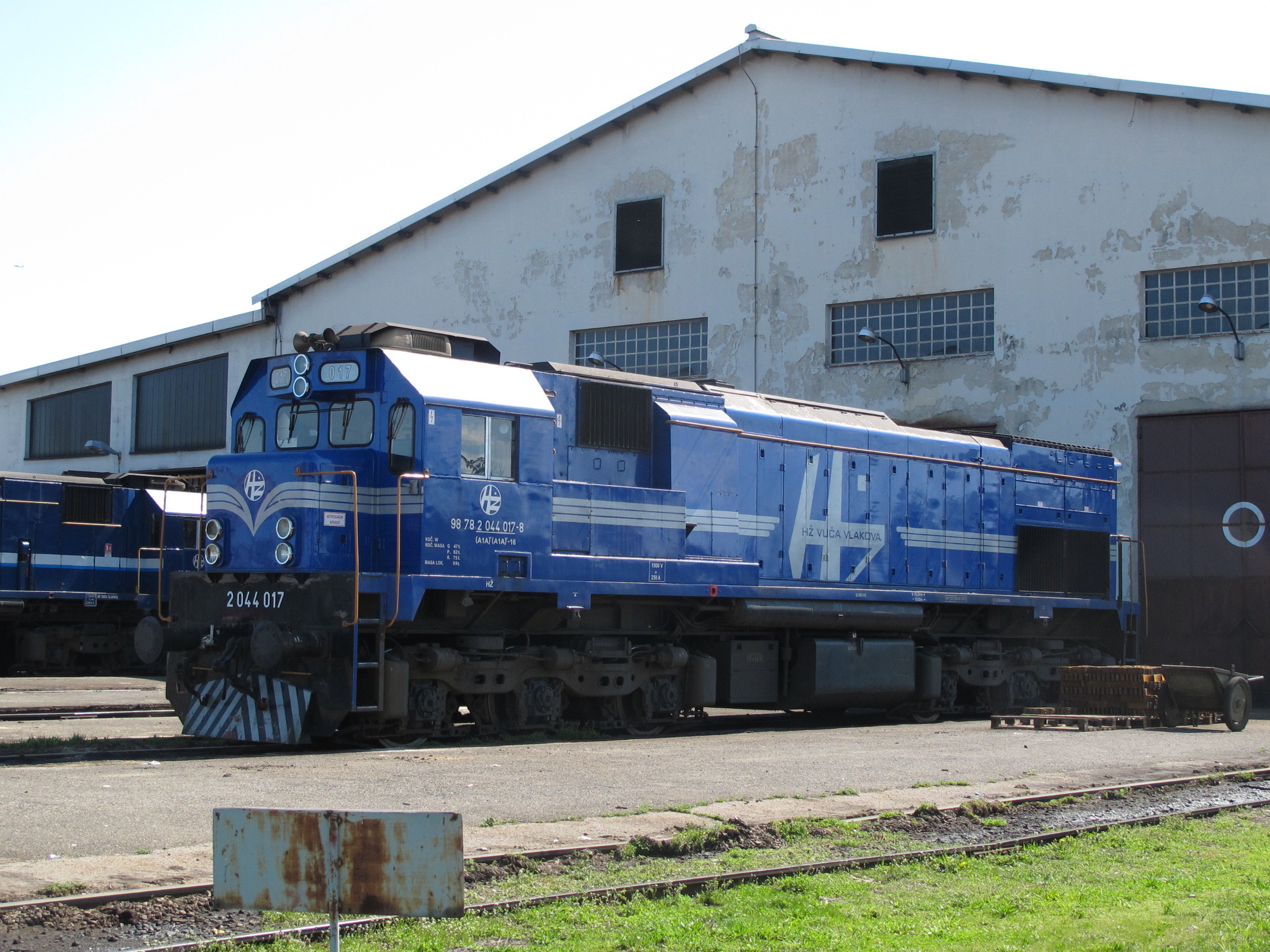
- Croatian Railways Series 2044
Type and origin
- Power type: Diesel-electric
- Builder: Electro-Motive Division / Đuro Đaković
- Build date: 1981 - 1984
Specifications
- Configuration
  - AAR: A1A-A1A
  - UIC: (A1A)' (A1A)'
- Gauge: 4 ft 8 1/2 in (1,435 mm) standard gauge
- Length: 16.994 m (55 ft 9 1/16 in)
- Loco weight: 97.5 t (96.0 long tons; 107.5 short tons)
- Prime mover: EMD 12-645E3
- Engine type: V12 diesel
- Cylinders: 12
Performance figures
- Maximum speed: 124 km/h (77 mph)
- Power output: 2,330 hp (1,740 kW)
Career
- Numbers: 2044.001–2044.031; 31 in HŽ (26 in use); JŽ-645
- Nicknames: "Karavela", "Mala Karavela"
- Locale: Croatia

The Electro-Motive Division GT22HW-2 is a custom designed EMD A1A-A1A diesel-electric locomotive built by Đuro Đaković for Yugoslavia. Mainly used for passenger service, the reliability of these locomotives made this model a success even after the breakup of Yugoslavia. Designated as the Series 645 in the Yugoslav Railways, these locomotives were later known as the Series 2044 in the Croatian Railways after 1991. Thirty four examples (645.001 - 645.034), of this model were built between February 1981 to August 1984 and were given four different lettering variations due to the various ethnicities existing in Yugoslavia at the time.

- .001 - .030 are lettered JUGOSLAVENSKE ŽELJEZNICE (Croatian)
- .031 - .032 are lettered ЈУГОСЛОВЕНСКЕ ЖЕЛЕЗНИЦE (Serbian Cyrillic)
- .033 - .034 are lettered JUGOSLOVENSKE ŽELEZNICE - HEKURUDHAT JUGOSLLAVE (Serbian/Albanian)

Due to the locomotive's unique designation, the model breaks down into several indications:

Electro-Motive Division / Đuro Đaković GT22HW-2
G	T	22	H	W	-2
Flushed Carbody	Turbocharged	EMD 645 Series Turbocharged V12 Diesel Engine	Head End Power equipped (Inverter type HEP System)	Wide traction motors (from standard gauge to Indian gauge)	EMD Dash 2 Electronics

Although the locomotives are equipped with A1A-A1A running gear, no official designation was present until 1993 due to low production.

== Sources ==
- Železnice Srbije (2006). "Dizel". Archived from the original on December 27, 2009.
- Valter, Z. (1984). Dizel-električna lokomotiva. Zagreb. 02-892/1-1984.
