= 79 Railway Squadron RLC =

The modern-day 79 Railway Squadron was part of the 17 Port and Maritime Regiment, The Royal Logistic Corps, of the British Army. They were responsible for maintaining and providing the British Army with its railway transportation requirements.

Originally, the Railway Squadron started life in the Royal Engineers at Longmoor Military Camp in Hampshire. They were known as the Longmoor Military Railway and operated steam locomotives. The squadron eventually moved to Mönchengladbach in West Germany and in the fullness of time became 79 Railway Squadron, Royal Corps of Transport. The locomotives were all diesel and for a while the future of the squadron seemed uncertain until 1983, when a multimillion-pound makeover was begun. New locomotives started to arrive, and the operating yard at Mönchengladbach got a makeover.

The squadron was relocated to Marchwood, near Southampton, in 1999. It was taken under command of 17 Port & Maritime Regiment RLC, and renamed 79 Port Enabling Squadron, with the addition of a troop of Vehicle Support Specialist (VSS) personnel.

The squadron was disbanded at Marchwood on 13 May 2012. The Vehicle Support Specialists were resubordinated elsewhere in the regiment, and the Military Railways capability ultimately lost on the disbandment of the remaining Territorial Army unit, 275 Railway Troop, in 2014.
