= Tourism in Kosovo =

Tourism in Kosovo is characterized by archaeological heritage from Illyrian, Dardanian, Roman, Byzantine, Serbian and Ottoman times, traditional Albanian and Serbian cuisine, architecture, religious heritage, traditions, and natural landscapes. Kosovo is situated in south-eastern Europe. With its central position in the Balkans, it serves as a link in the connection between central and south Europe, the Adriatic Sea, and Black Sea.

The New York Times included Kosovo on the list of 41 Places to go in 2011. In the same year, Kosovo saw a jump of about 40 places on the Skyscanner flight search engine which rates global tourism growth.

Kosovo's monuments are classified as common property for which the society is responsible to maintain them in order to transmit their authenticity to future generations.

Kosovo has a variety of natural features. It is surrounded by mountains: the Sharr Mountains are located in the south and southeast, bordering North Macedonia, while the Kopaonik mountain range rise in the north. The southwest borders with Albania and Montenegro are also mountainous and home to the country's highest peak, Gjeravica, 2,656 m (8,714 ft) high.

The bulk of international tourists going to Kosovo are from Albania, Germany, Italy, the United States, the United Kingdom, Croatia and Austria. Tourism is a growing sector with more tourists visiting every year.

== Natural attractions ==
=== National parks ===
Kosovo has two declared national parks and those are the Bjeshkët e Nemuna National Park and Sharr Mountains National Park.

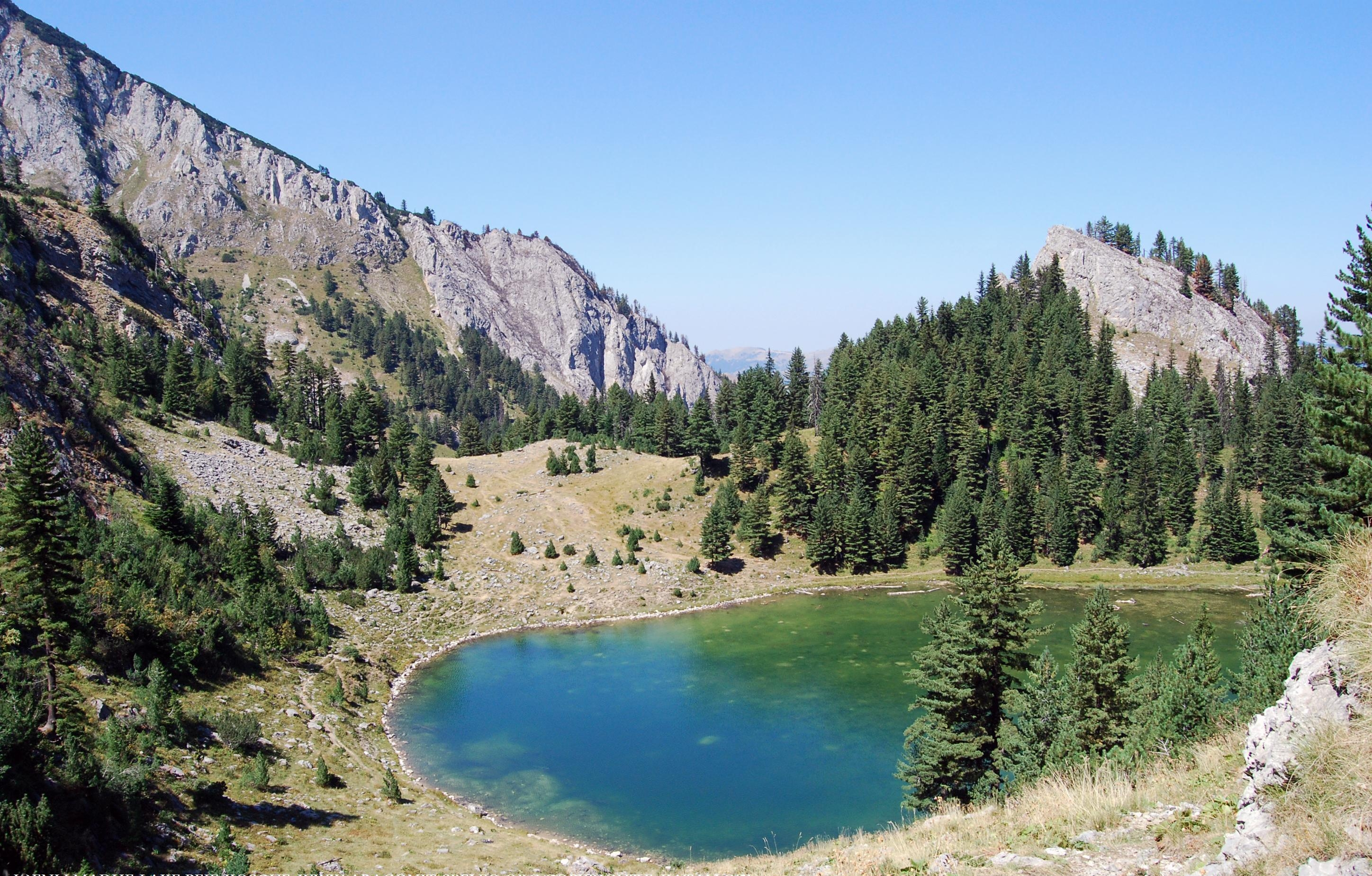
Liqenat Lake is a mountain lake located in the Bjeshkët e Nemuna National Park.

Bjeshkët e Nemuna National Park is located in the districts of Gjakova and Peja in the Accursed Mountains range in western Kosovo. Spanning over 63,028 hectares (155,750 acres) of rugged mountains, the area boasts a multitude of lakes, thick deciduous and coniferous forests, and alpine vistas. Its designation as a park stems from the need to safeguard the diverse ecosystems, biodiversity, and the rich tapestry of cultural and historical heritage it holds.

Sharr Mountains National Park, situated in southwestern Kosovo, it unfolds its natural beauty. Encompassing 53,272 hectares (131,640 acres), the national park includes diverse landscapes, the park features glacial lakes, as well as alpine and periglacial terrains. It was declared a national park in 1986, and re-established in 2012 by the new Kosovar Government.

=== Other ===
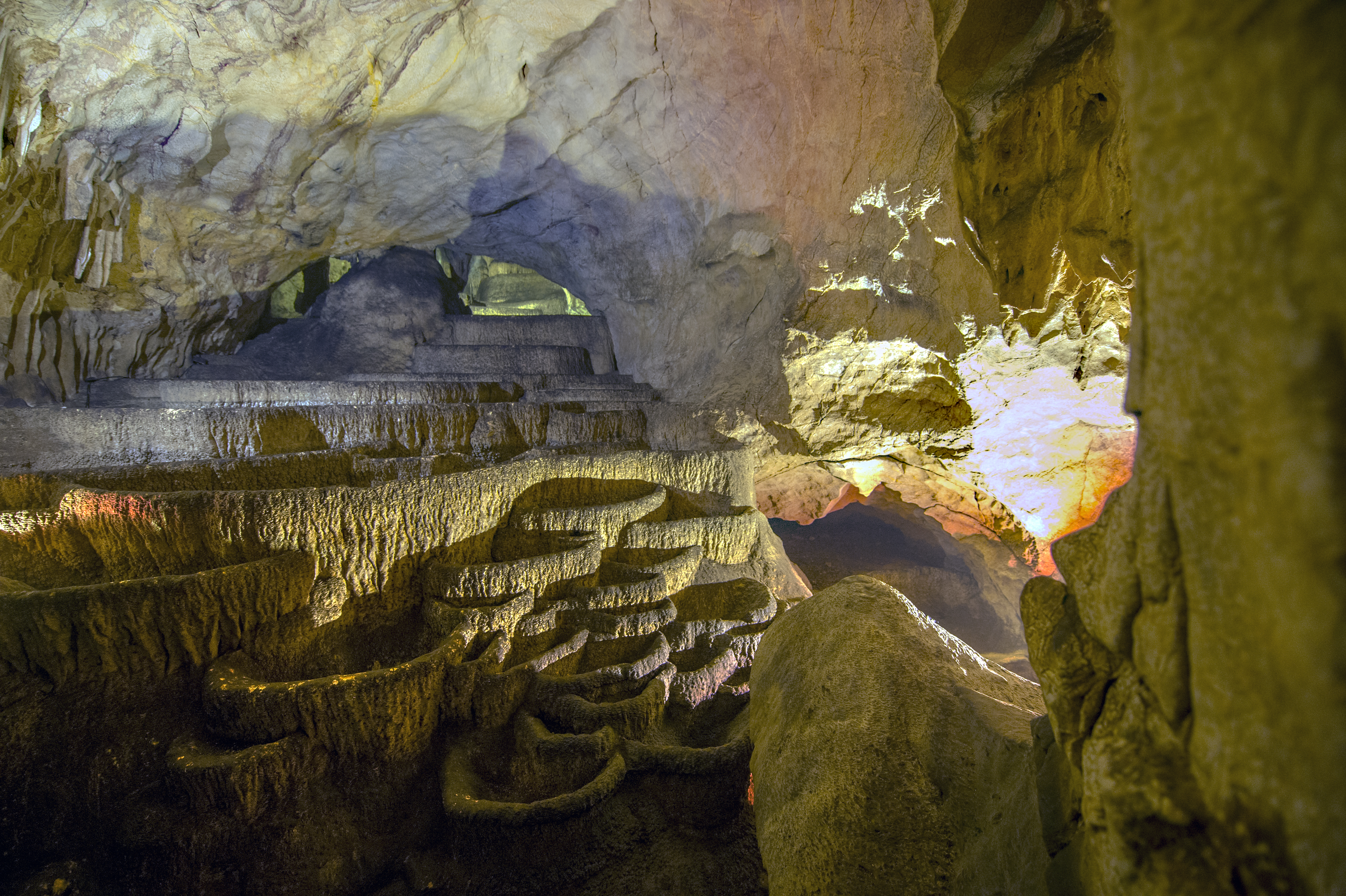
The Bukuroshja e Fjetur Cave stands as one of the rare caves nestled in Kosovo. Positioned close to the captivating White Drin Waterfall, it emerges as an excellent tourist hotspot.

White Drin Waterfall and the Bukuroshja e Fjetur Cave, both located near each other in the Accursed Mountains in the north of Peja, are some of the most famous tourist destinations in Kosovo, drawing thousands of visitors from both local and international origins.

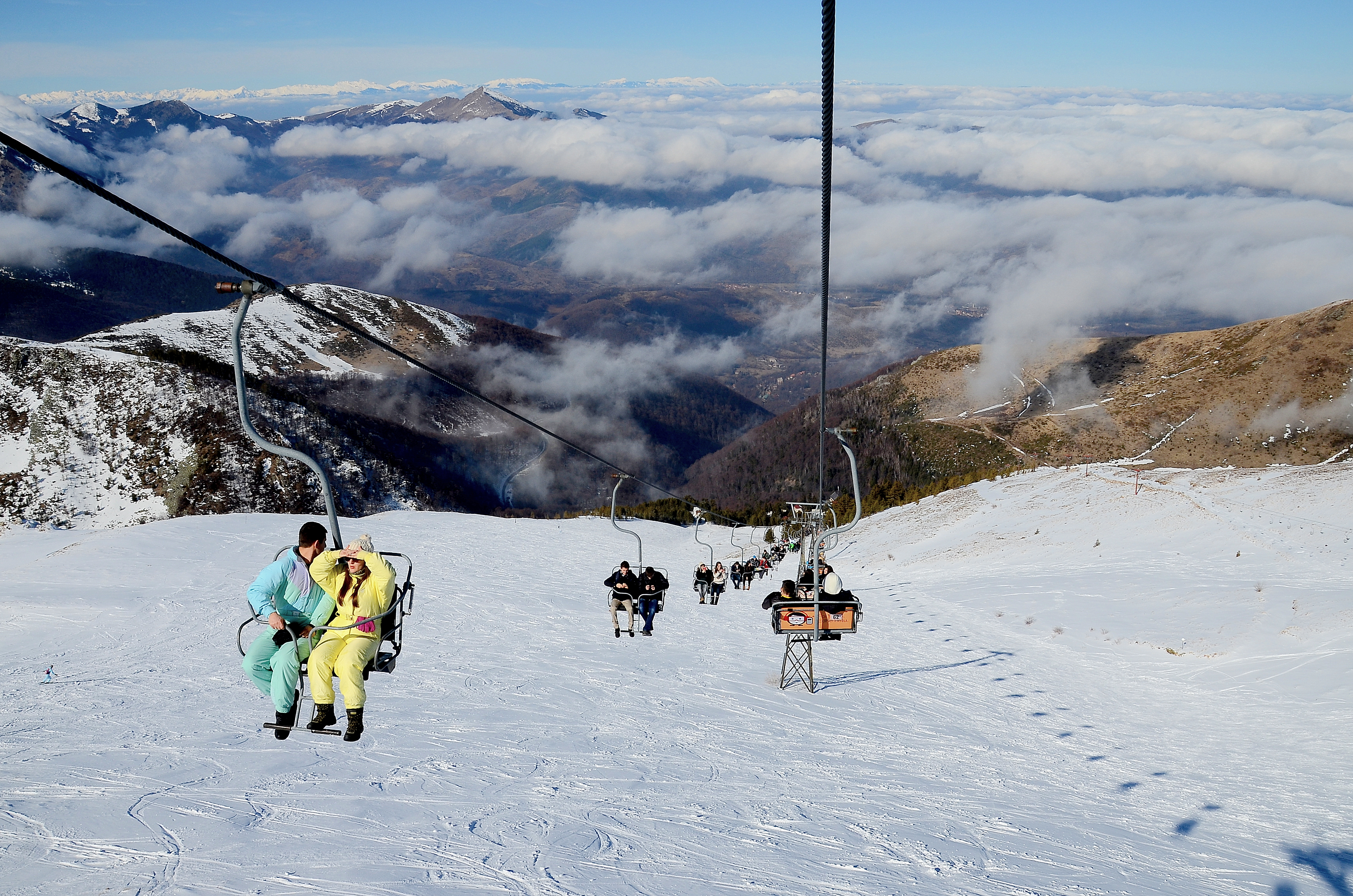
Brezovica ski resort is one of the best destinations for winter tourism in Kosovo.

Located on the slopes of Sharr Mountains in southern Kosovo, the Brezovica ski resort claims its status as the premier hub for winter tourism in Kosovo. During winter, mainly skiing and snowboarding take place. As the seasons transition to summer, the resort transforms into an eco-tourism haven, offering opportunities for hiking, mountain biking, golf and various outdoor activities.

Other natural attractions include Lake Batllava, Mirusha Waterfalls, Gjeravica, Marble Cave, Rugova Canyon.

== Cities ==
Some of the most visited cities include:

- Pristina – the capital of Kosovo. Pristina accommodates the grave of Kosovo's first president Ibrahim Rugova. The Gërmia and the Italian park are the most visited parks in the city. Other attractions in the capital include the Kosovo Museum, Ethnological Museum, the clock tower and the Imperial Mosque.

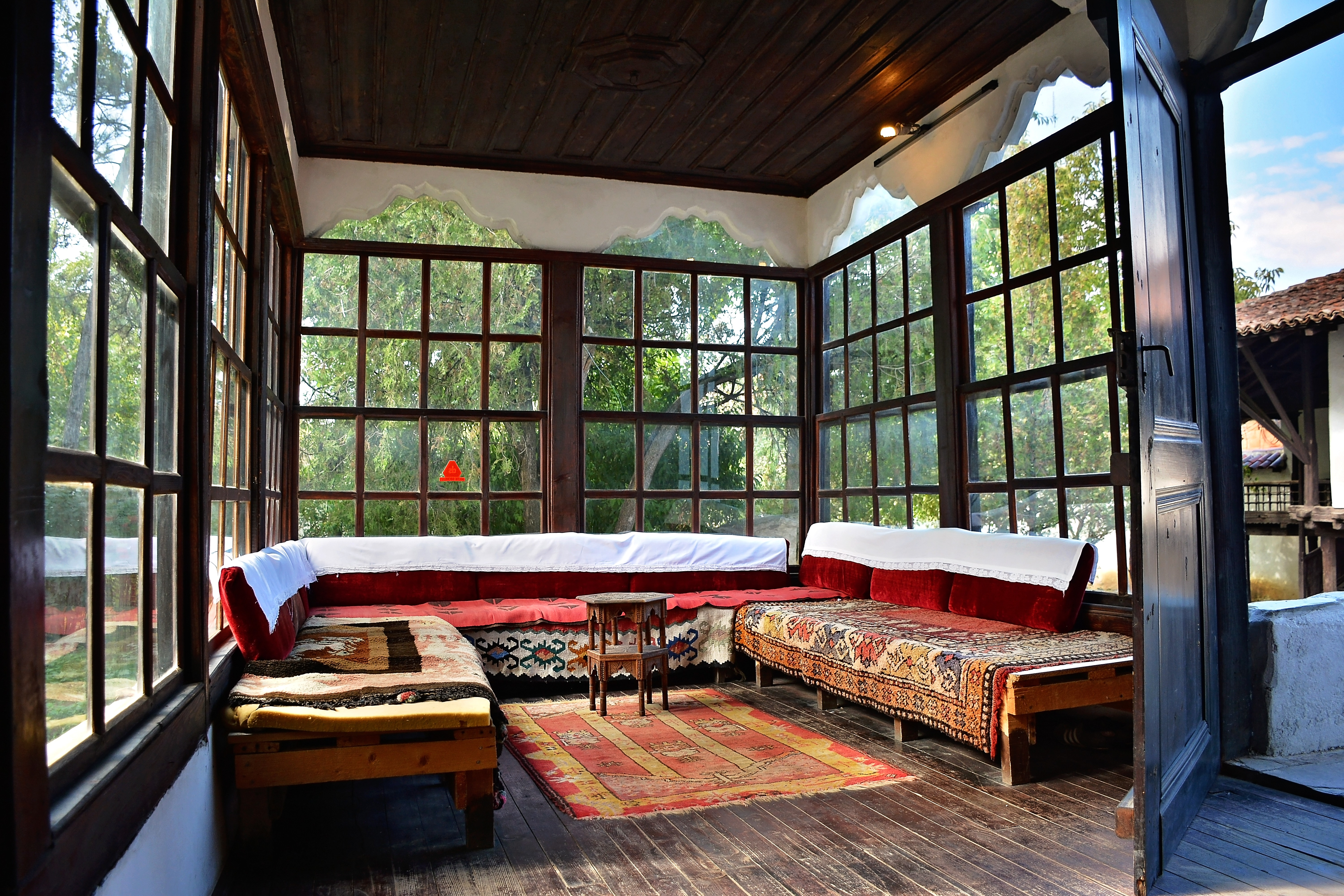
Ethnological Museum, a monument of culture from the 18th century

- Gjakova – a city with nightlife and historical monuments. Monuments include mosques, churches, bridges and museums.
- Peja – a city along the Lumbardhi i Pejës river. It is located near the Accursed Mountains. The center of the city is marked by different craft shops, such as tailors, goldsmiths and leather tanners. Old mosques like the Bajrakli mosque and the Orthodox church are part of the historical monuments of the city.
- Prizren – a town with a well-preserved Ottoman quarter, and a Roman-built castle. Prizren is located on the Lumbardhi i Prizrenit river and is near the Šar Mountains. Prizren contains the Prizren Fortress as well as the Serbian Orthodox Our Lady of Ljeviš church.
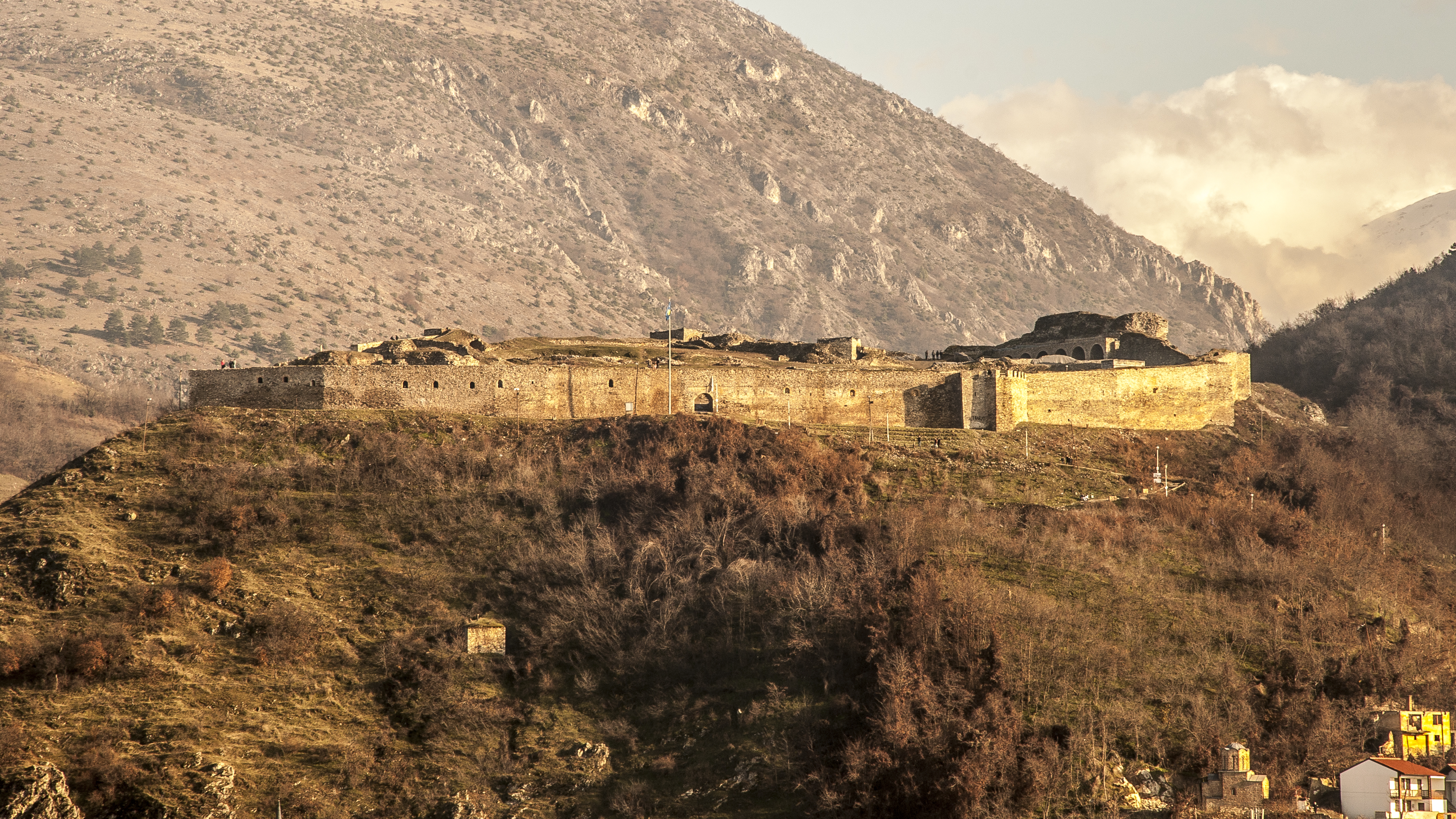
  The Prizren Fortress is a hilltop fortification that dates from the Bronze Age.
- Novo Brdo – a municipality in central Kosovo. Novo Brdo offers its visitors various hiking and mountain-biking possibilities. Some archaeological localities of the medieval town include the medieval castle, religious buildings and cemeteries.
- Ulpiana – an ancient city of Illyrian Dardania from the 2nd century in the Balkan peninsula. It is known to have been re-constructed by emperor Justinian I.
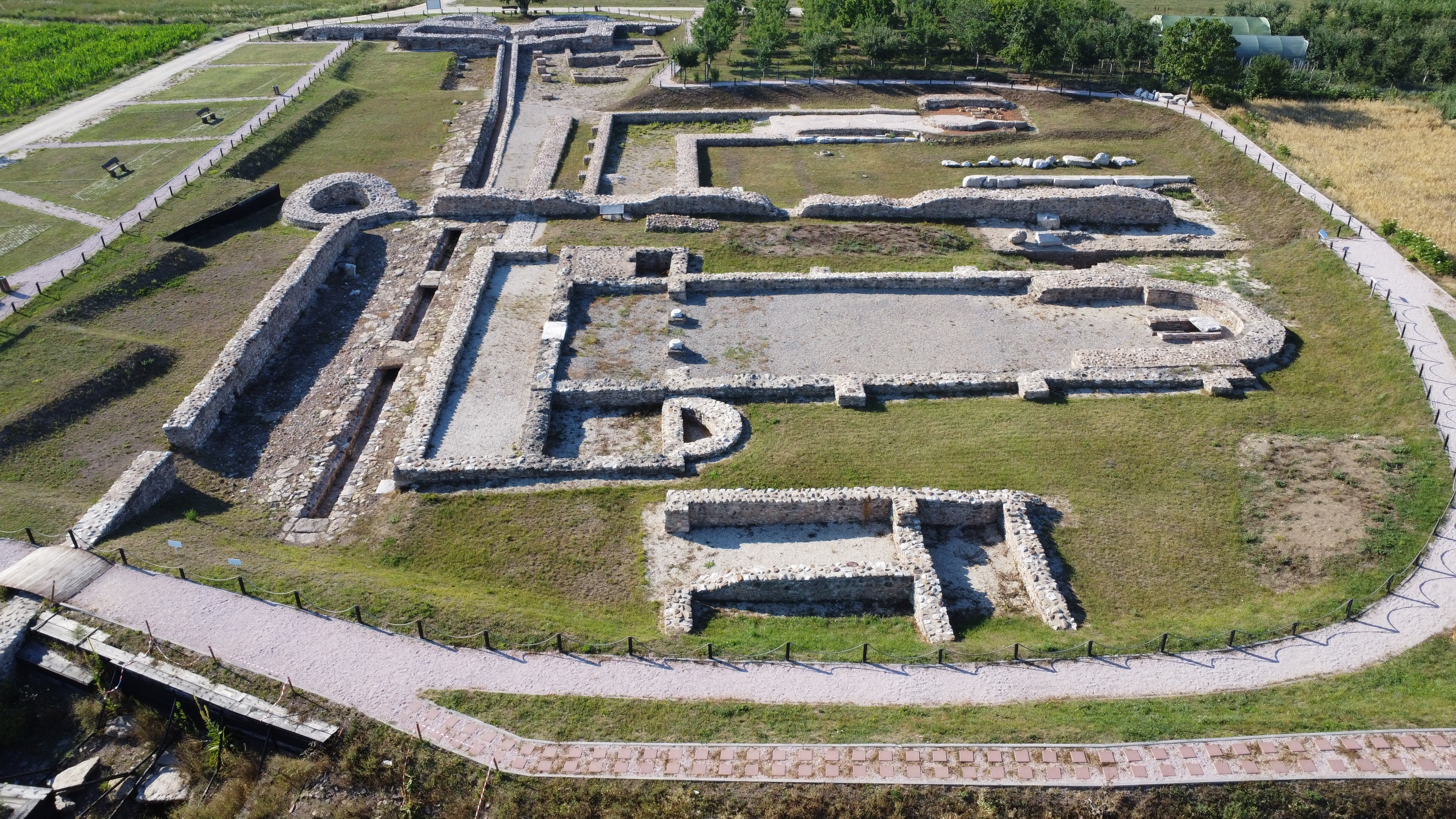
  Ulpiana, an ancient Dardanian city

== Architecture ==
- Medieval Monuments in Kosovo, a combined UNESCO World Heritage Site including:
  - Patriarchate of Peć, this complex of four churches was built between 1230 and 1330 by the medieval Serbian royal Nemanjić dynasty. The church was the seat of the Serbian Patriarchate since 1302. It is considered to be of great national importance to Serbs and Serbia.
  - Visoki Dečani Monastery, one of the most important monasteries of the Serbian Orthodox Church in Kosovo. It was built from 1307- 1328.
  - Gračanica monastery- was completed in 1321 by the Serbian King Milutin. The monastery is an example of Serbian medieval (14th century) ecclesiastical architecture, and is a UNESCO World Heritage Site.
  - Our Lady of Ljeviš
- Ottoman Architecture, including:
  - Imperial Mosque in Pristina (1461)
  - Mehmet Pasha's Mosque (1561) which is today encompassed by the Albanian League Museum
  - Sinan Pasha Mosque in Prizren (1615)
  - Tomb of Sultan Murad from the 14th Century
  - Hammams (bathhouses) in Prizren, Pristina, etc.

== Statistics ==
The Statistical Agency of the Kosovo publishes hotel statistics on a quarterly basis since 2008. In 2023, the reported number of hotel nights spent by non-residents was 746,501 compared to 544,701 in the previous year. The number of foreign visitors also increased from 297,588 in 2022 to 357,717 in 2023.

The following table illustrates the number of non resident visitors according to country of origin recorded in 2023. The data was issued by the Statistical Office of the Republic of Kosovo.

Rank	Country	Number
1	Albania	90,518
2	Germany	41,105
3	Switzerland	36,812
4	Turkey	23,482
5	North Macedonia	17,024
6	United States	15,780
7	Italy	11,164
8	Serbia	9,354
9	Austria	9,215
10	Montenegro	8,741
11	Others	44,849
	Total	357,717

== Issues regarding entering Kosovo ==
Serbia considers Kosovo to be an integral part of its territory and thus does not consider the designated crossing with Kosovo to be an international border. Serbia does not apply entry or exit stamps to the passports of those using these crossings. Serbia also does not recognize the designated entry points between Kosovo (including Pristina airport) and third countries because they are not under the control of Serbian authorities. Foreign nationals have been denied entry to Serbia by Serbian border officials if they don't have a current Serbian entry stamp in their passport. If a visit to Serbia is planned after visiting Kosovo, entering Serbia via North Macedonia is recommended.

Citizens of Albania, Montenegro and Serbia may use a national ID card at border crossings with no stamping involved. Meanwhile, citizens of EU countries, North Macedonia, Monaco and San Marino may use a biometric national ID card (excluding e.g. Austrian, French and Greek citizens, but including e.g. Dutch, German and Swedish citizens)

== See also ==
- Tourism in Pristina
- Geography of Kosovo
- Culture of Kosovo
- Hiking in Kosovo
- Medieval Monuments in Kosovo
- Cuisine of Kosovo
- Architecture of Kosovo
- Municipalities of Kosovo
