= Ethnological Museum, Pristina =

Ethnographic museum in Pristina, Kosovo

Ethnological Museum
- Muzeu etnologjik
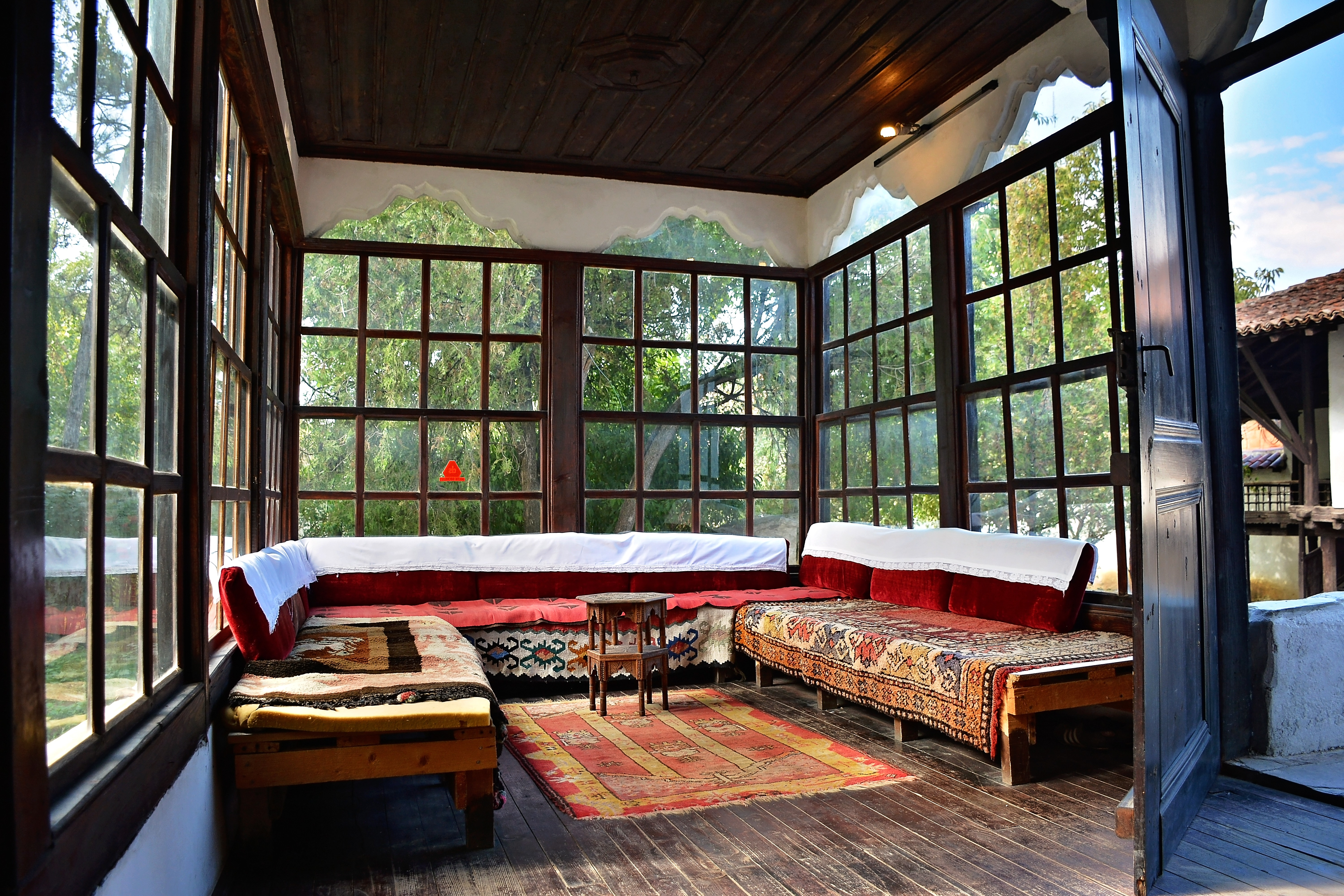
- Location: Pristina, Kosovo

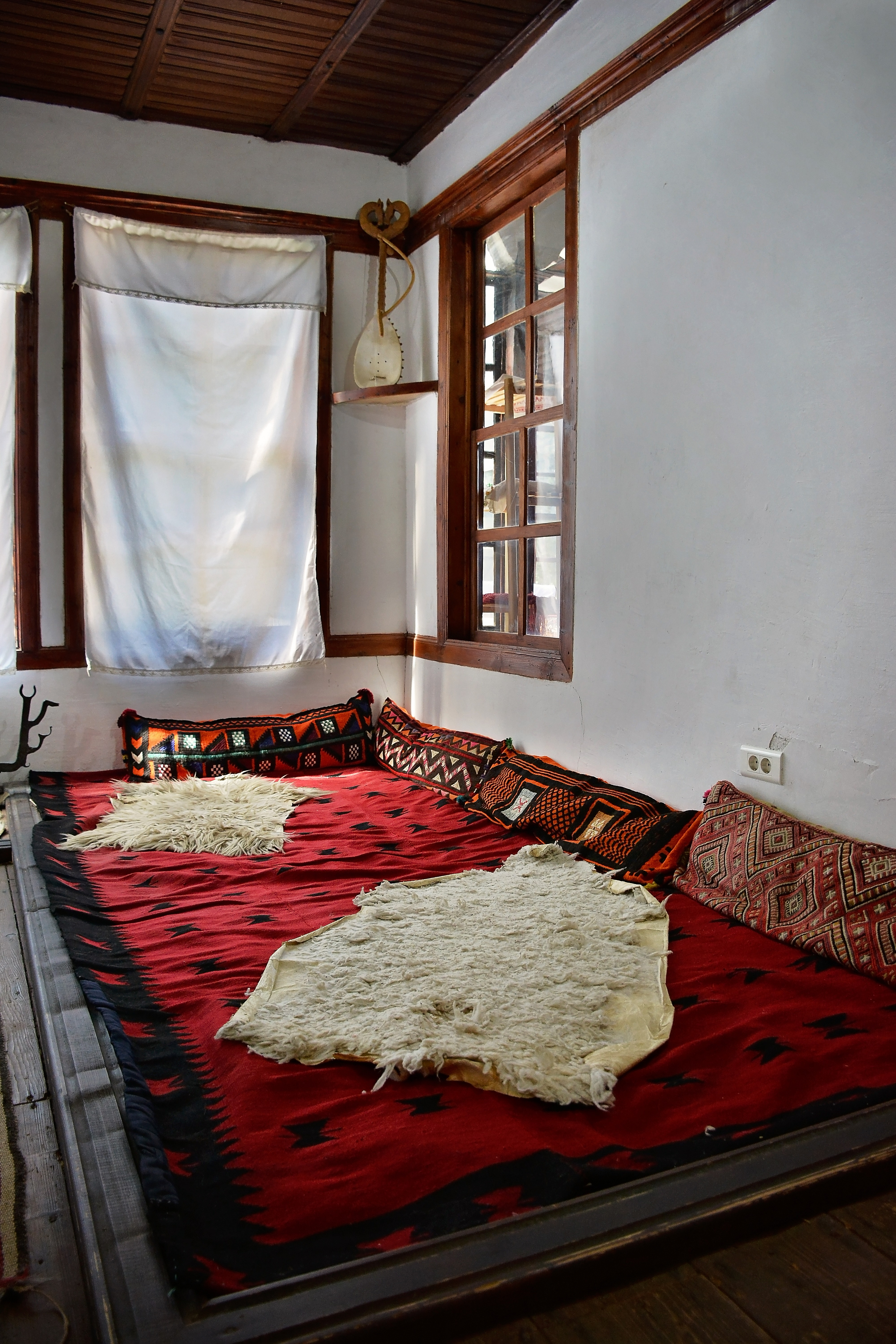
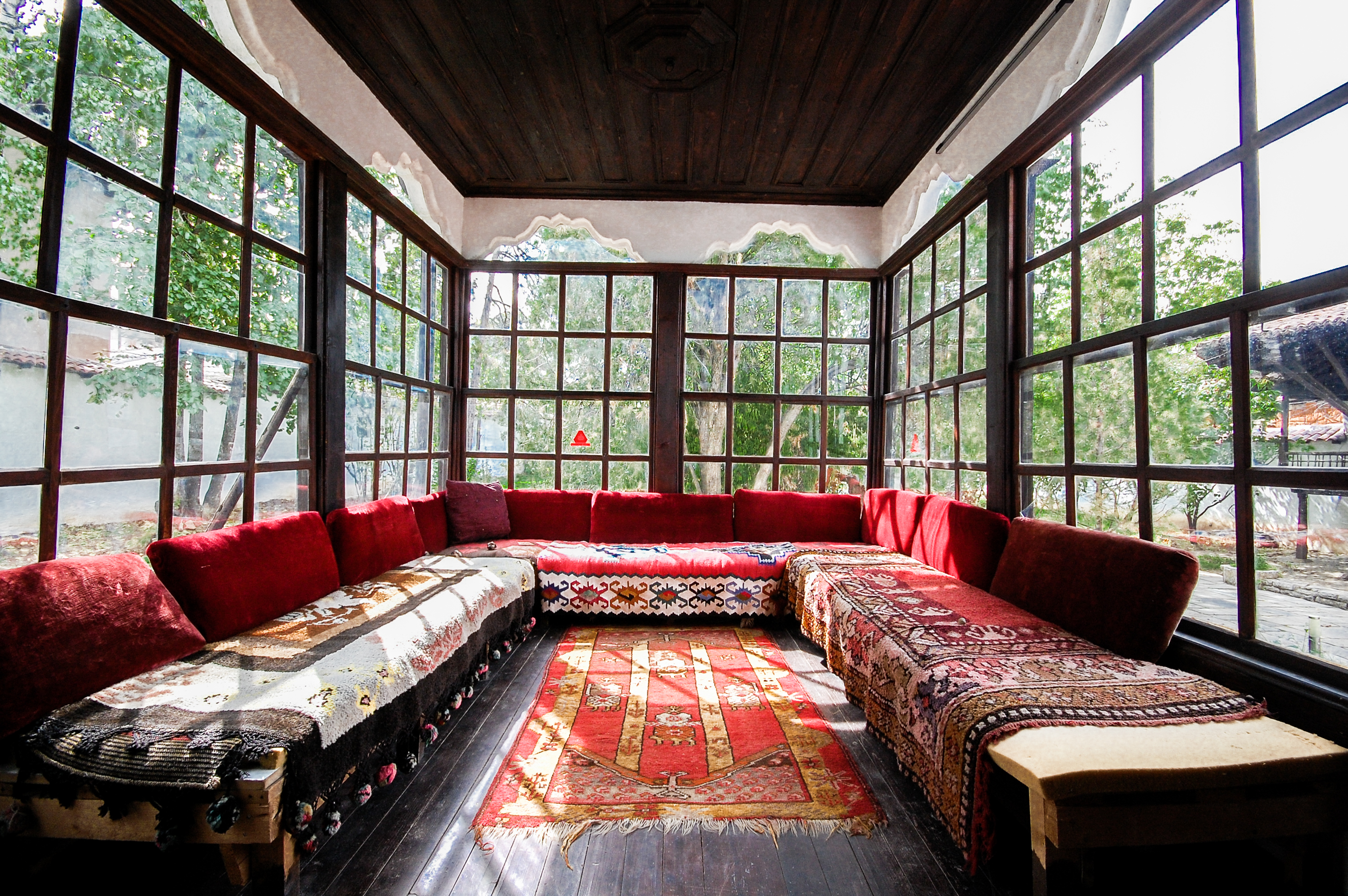
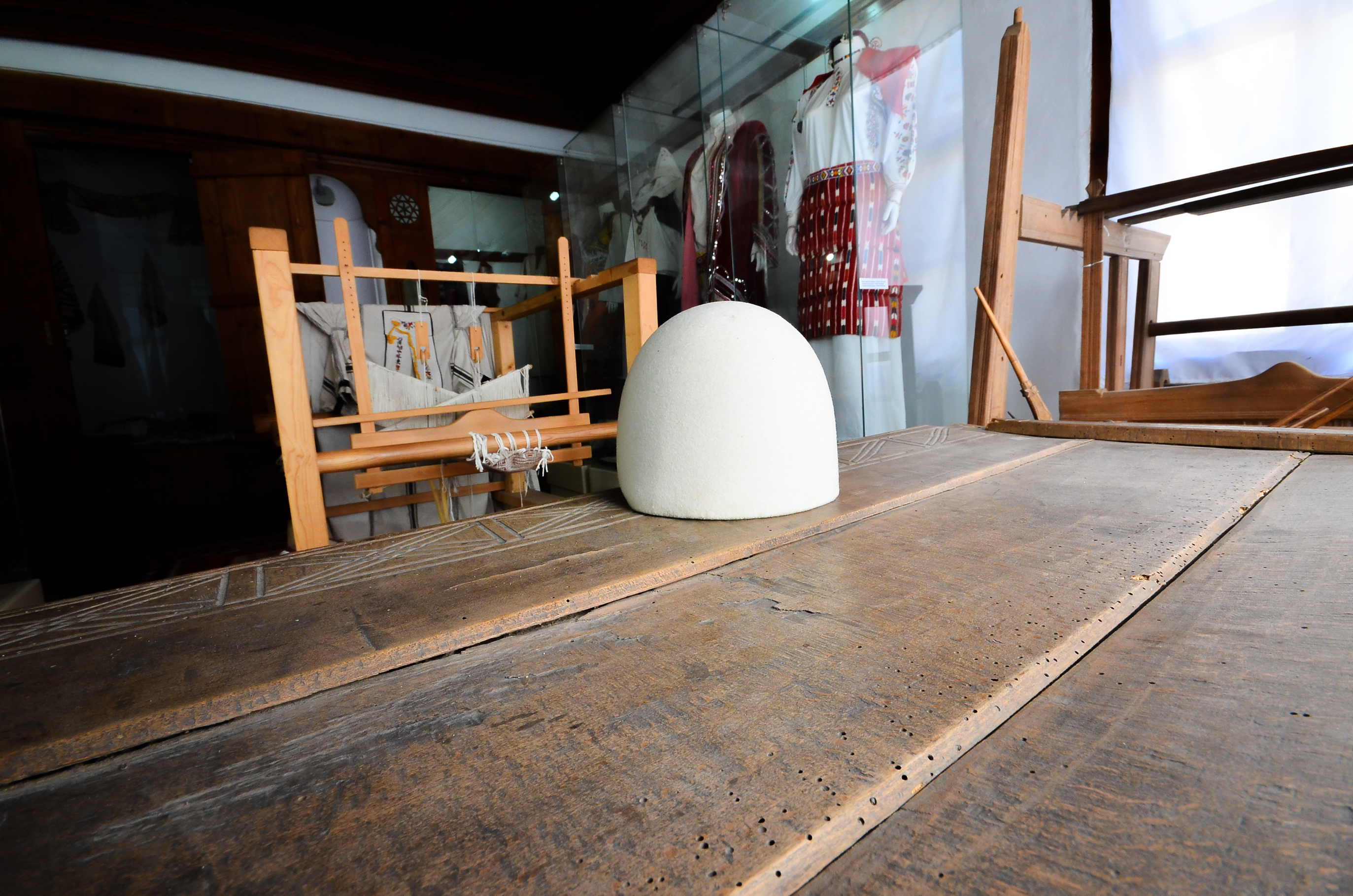
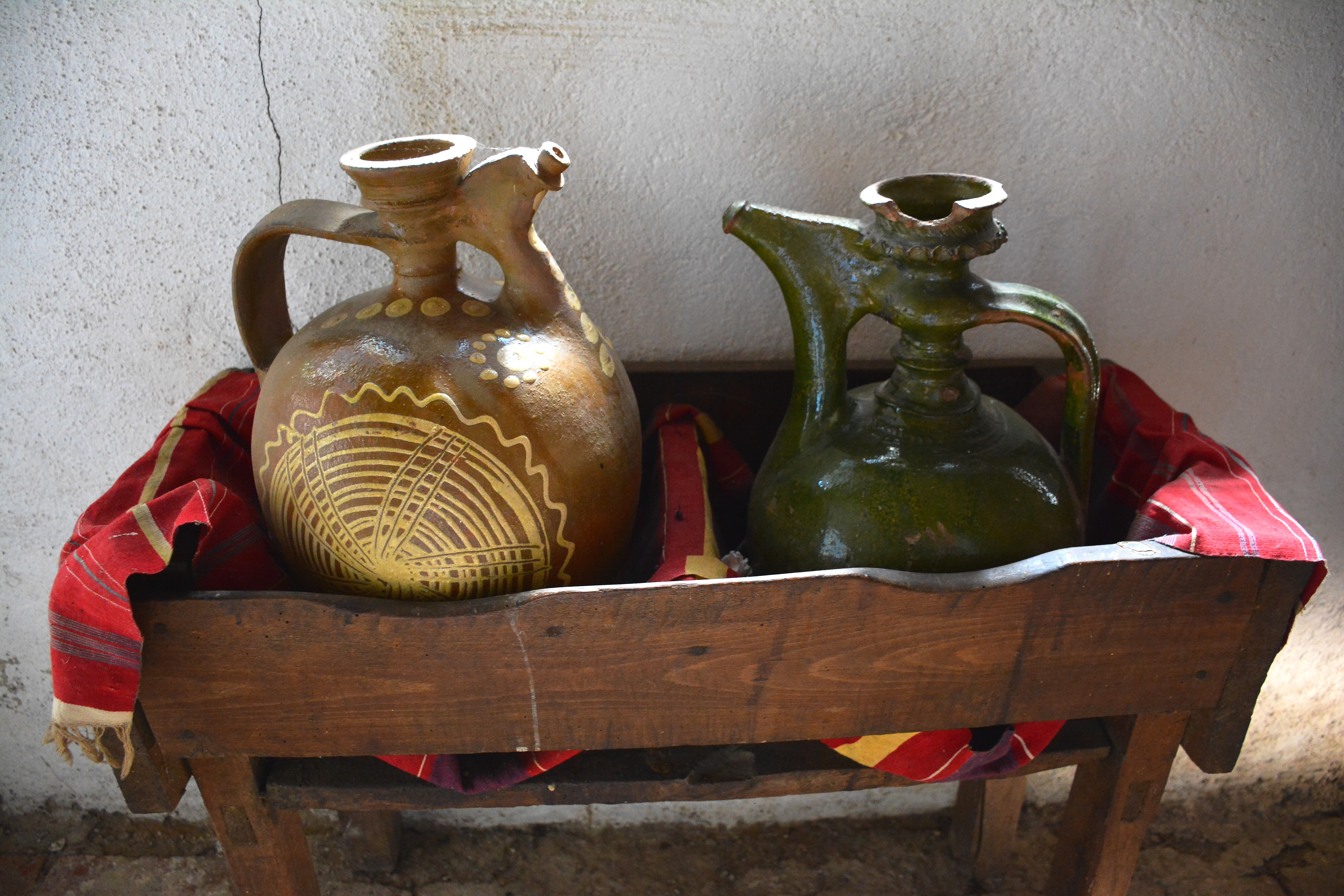
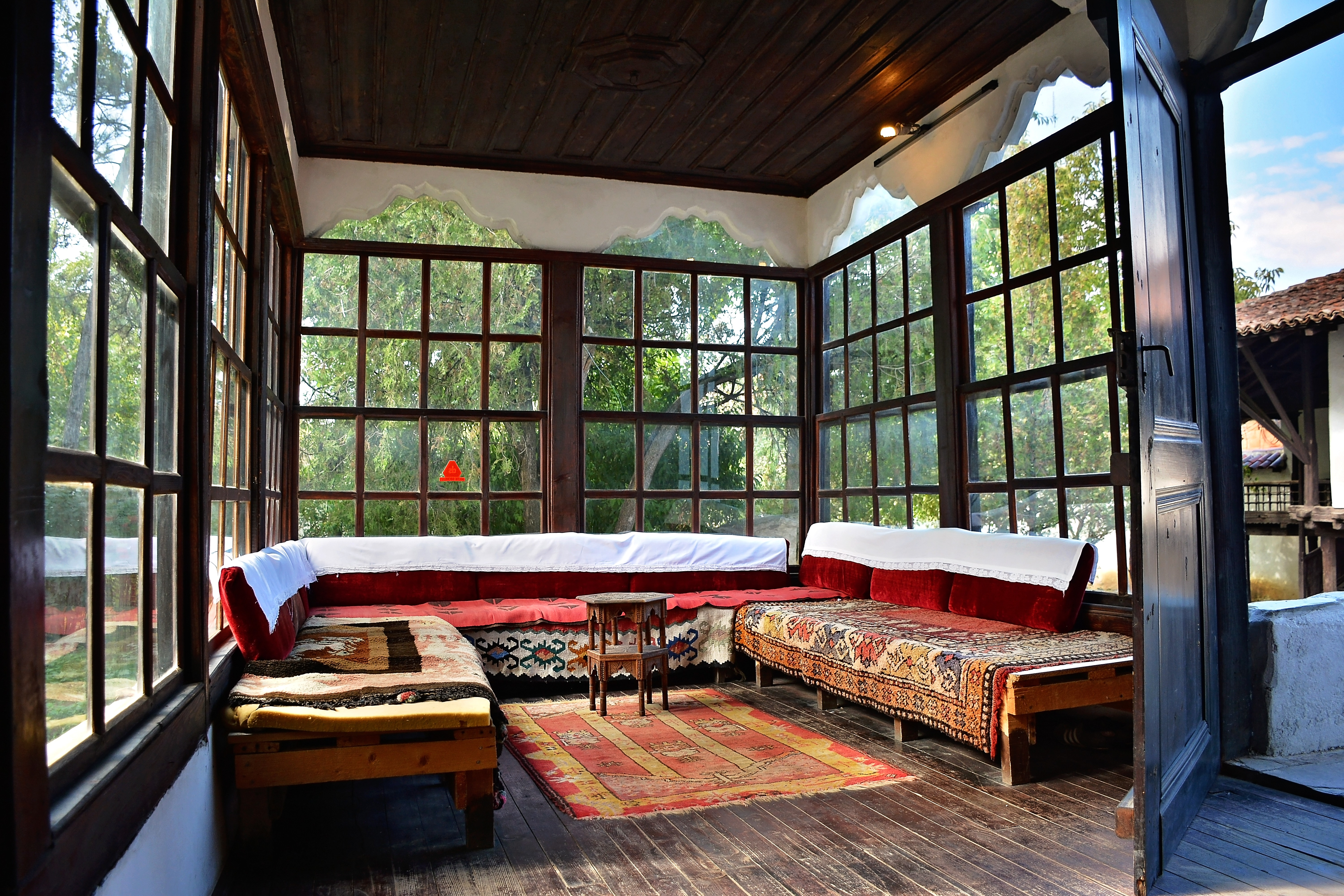
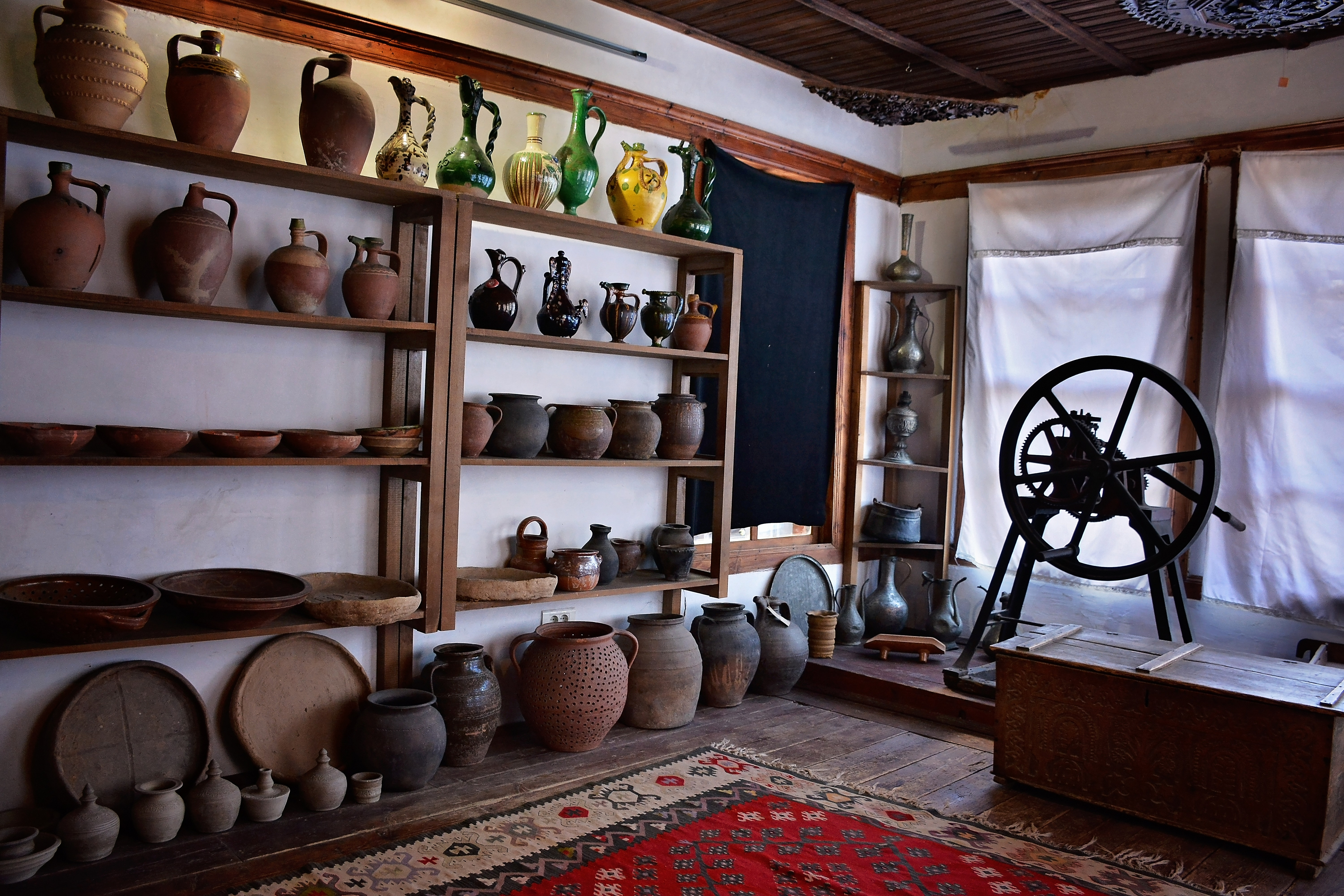
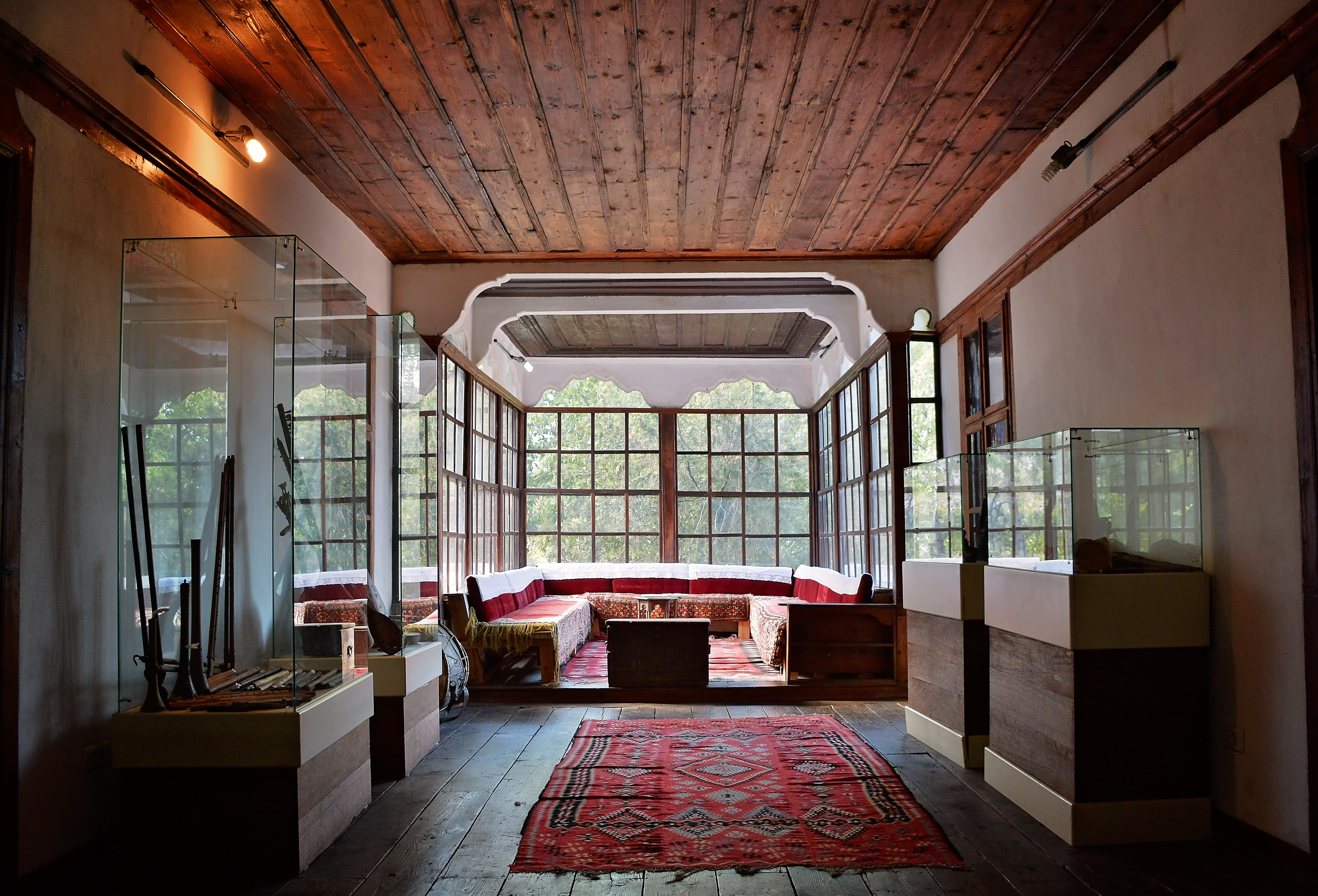
The Museum shows the story of life during the Ottoman rule in Kosovo from the 15th century through to the 20th century.

The Ethnological Treasure of Kosovo is an ethnographic museum in Pristina, Kosovo. It is located in the Emin Gjiku Complex, a monument of culture from the 18th century. The house was once owned by the family of Emin Gjikolli. The name Emin Gjikolli means "little man", in Turkish the spelling is "Eminçik", which the complex holds as the name today. In the museum, tools and items related to lifestyle from the Ottoman Kosovo period are on display.

In 2002, the Ethnological Museum opened its exhibition of a permanent nature, in which ancient clothing, tools, containers furniture, old weapons, etc., were presented.

Until 1990, the Emin Gjiku Complex served as a nature museum, but after the completion of internationally funded conservation works in 2003, it was turned into an ethnological museum housing a vast collection of traditional costumes as well as utensils, handcraft elements, and other tools used in everyday life. The above-mentioned collection is sheltered in the two central buildings of the complex (the house and the guest house) situated at the inner court, while at the entrance court, the relocated building is rented under a special contract by the museum to the Contemporary Art Centre 'Stacion' in Prishtina and the stable, the object of the study, is left unused to date, despite the constant promises by the director of the museum to turn it into a traditional food restaurant.

== Pottery ==
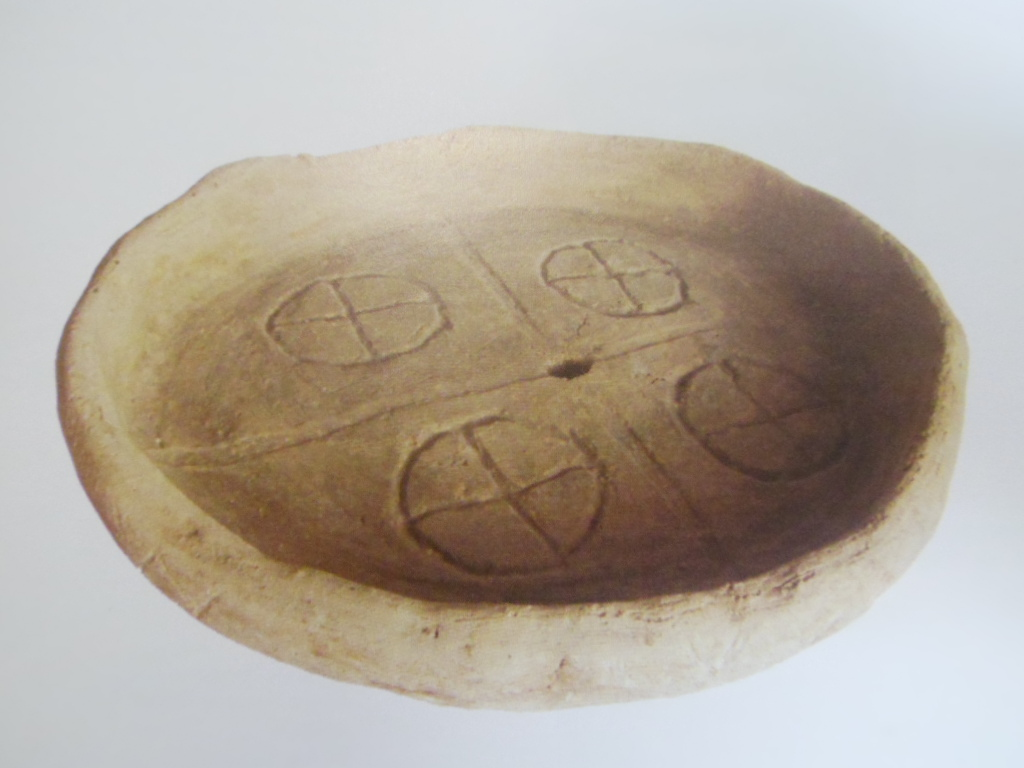
Çerep, an ancient pottery art, made by housewives for baking bread, it was used until the 20th century.

Pottery was an early art practice in daily ancient Albanian Illyrian life. Archaeological history findings tell that the production of these goods for practical life service dates back to antiquity and this type of production made of clay lives together with the human being even today, although now only as decorative means. -Productions of pottery amongst ancient Illyrians is found in usage in a daily life basis. They were made in the shape of dishes for storage of food and drinks. It was a known art in the Albanian ethnic area. This type of craftsmanship has been taught for generations because the baked clay was used for producing a series of objects for the preservation and cultivation of foods. The clay was also used to produce dishes of different types, shapes, and sizes adequate for the practical needs of service people at all times. These pots were known as pitos. Drinks, cereals, and other foods were preserved in them. The small types of dishes served in the daily practice for keeping fluid and except this other types of dishes and objects were produced serving for cult and decoration purposes. From the physiognomy and morphology of production, it must have been a craftsmanship almost professional with the exception of producing tools for baking bread, known as çerep. Dishes and furniture from pottery have found their usage extensively in Illyrian people in the village and city as well. This type of craftsmanship had been practiced a lot until around the 1970s. Pottery products now may be encountered only as illustrations of a past era or just for curiosity and decoration. Now, people may encounter rare masters of pottery, which could be counted as three or four.

== Wood treasures ==
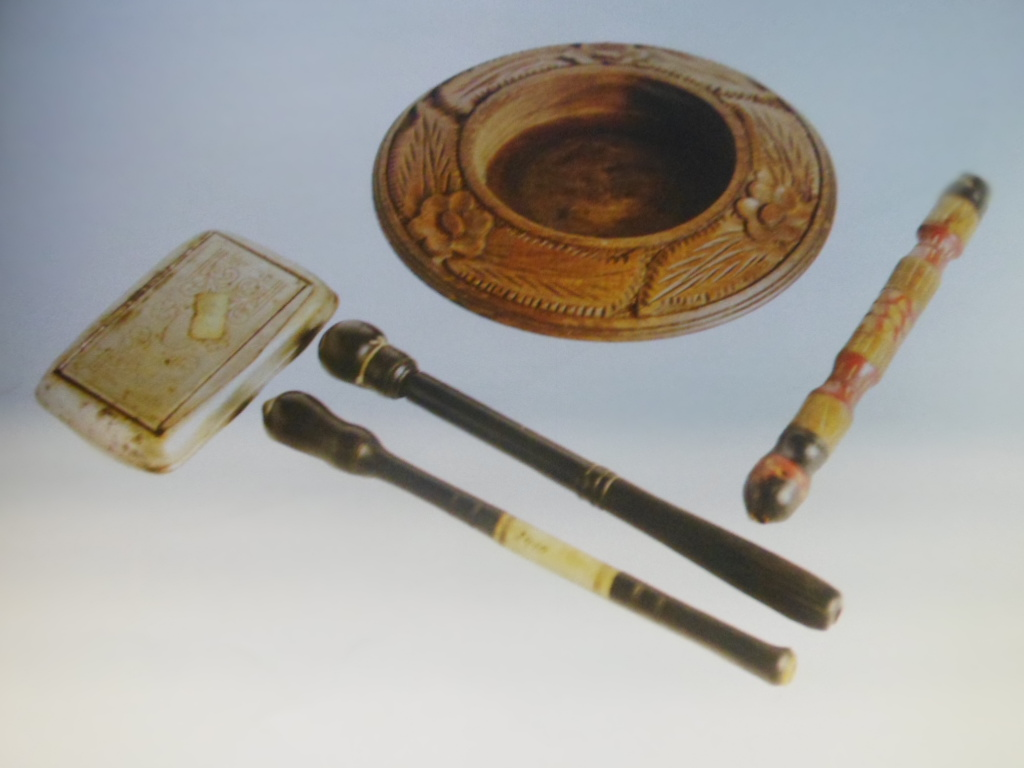
Albanian wooded ashtray.

Albanian people are considered one of the oldest peoples in the region of Balkans, and maybe even in the continent, possessing quite rich traditions and touching deeply in history regarding the use of wood in practical life. Products made of wood in Albanian people's work are of diverse types. In this aspect, it may be asserted that wood-made products are mainly outlined from the complexity of working tools, furniture, decorations, and household equipment for daily use. Almost from the earliest times, for wood products there were two types of craftsmen to be distinguished; the folk ones and the professional craftsmen. Both these categories of craftsmen used to produce in their form and manner, but it may be stated that the folk craftsman was more widely spread and would produce their own products mainly for home use, whereas the professional craftsman usually would put their products into the market; which implies that it had the universal concept, more advanced and involving an artistic charm of their products. It is important to mention that a considerable contingent of products of tools of wood contain in themselves a great ornamental wealth which undoubtedly expresses peoples beliefs, which deeply originate from history. Since paganism, such expressions have lasted centuries and the elements of such, although in minimal figures nowadays, are still encountered today and coexist in one form or another with Albanian people.

== Demotic linen and textiles ==
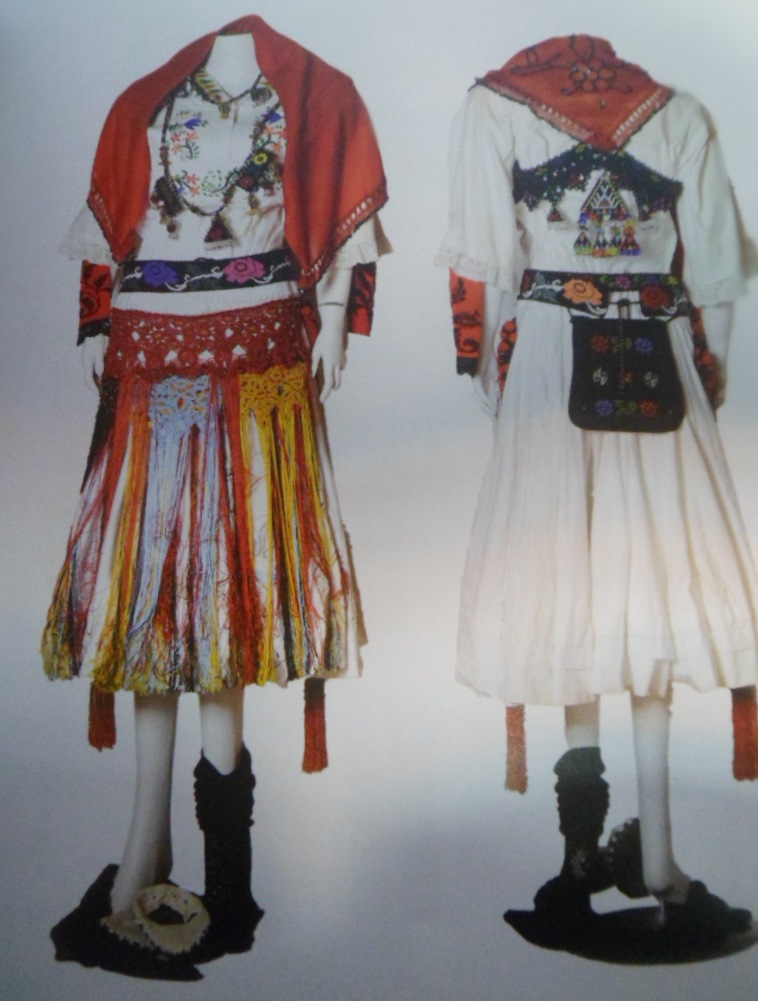
Traditional bridal clothes of the 20th century in the province of Rugova.

The history of textiles among Albanian people and their production, according to some study sources, dates back to antiquity. As for illustration, it can be mentioned that the Fustanella (kit) and Xhubleta, as worn by women, are considered to illustrate, by example, their life duration. Linen and textiles among Albanians are handmade and Vek-made products which in the past were very widely spread. They were so widely spread that each home and family had produced such as linen as well as textiles in their house environments with classical means, first of all, made of sheep and goat wool, and made of other materials like linen, cotton, etc. like very craftsmanship, this type of production of linen and fabric has the complexity of work in production. Traditionally Albanian people have had the fixed idea of wearing beautiful, orderly, and tasteful clothing, and they preserve it as a very precious treasure even nowadays. In linen and in textile as well, it is not only encountered as brilliant techniques of physical production but also as the art that is expressed through ornamental and artistic figures. Within the ornamental aspect, there are figures outlined that are directly related to people's beliefs, which reflect the spirit of the people, since the earliest times of paganism through periods until today. The craftsmanship and production of linen and textiles in the past have not been widely spread only in the urban or rural areas but in both areas. Although reality says so, the traditional treasures of linen and textile, classical production from vek. Thanking the interest and consequences of devoted researchers of ethnoculture in the sciences of a museum, there are traces even physically that are preserved in the Museum of Kosovo, through what ethnocultural values of tradition regarding linen and wearing are reflected through physical objects.

== Weapons ==
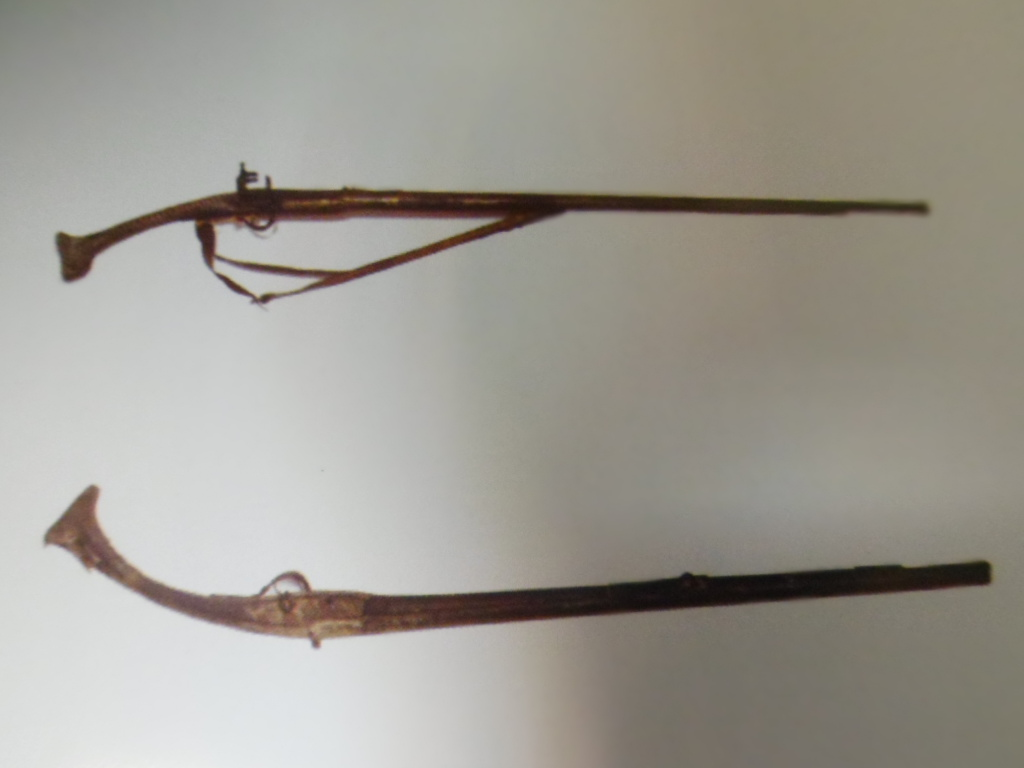
Albanian gun during 1878 called "Karanfile" (Gillyflower).

Albanian people, as one of the most antique peoples of the Balkans, inherited from the past, a rich material culture. When speaking of weapons, it must be mentioned that an Albanian person never went away from their weapon. The weapon accompanied them in all their lifetime. In every case. in any risk they have relied on it. An Albanian lets themself be killed but never surrenders their weapon. The gun has equal importance with the honor of their home, with the honor of their wife and his children, to always be ready in reaction to any war cry against invaders, each individual and every family was obliged to ensure a weapon, to any man from 13 to 15 years old. The weapons made in Kosovo, especially in Prizren, Peja and Gjakova were of high quality and they were sold throughout the whole Ottoman Empire, even outside the Empire, like in Egypt, Little Asia, Persia, India, etc. The shops where weapons were produced in the majority of cases were located on certain roads or in centuries of the cities. According to the data from 1866, in Prizren there were 208 weapon workshops, 53 were even specialized in the production of barrels of the weapon and circuits of the pistols and 155 shops were doing the decoration of weapons with golden and silver applications. Production of weapons was made in processes. The process of producing barrels (drilling with "metkap" and long "kalizvar"), the process of making circuits, making belts by leather workers, tempering and testing shots, assembling, and finally the process of decorating the boxes by the silversmiths. The weapons are decorated with different types of motifs. Every trade center had its own profile and special technique of weapon decoration. Techniques of weapon decoration were of diverse natures such as decoration with filigree, with "Savat", with silver work. (The text written for permanent exhibition in the complex Emin Gjiku, from the author Bashkim Lajçi).

== Body jewellery ==
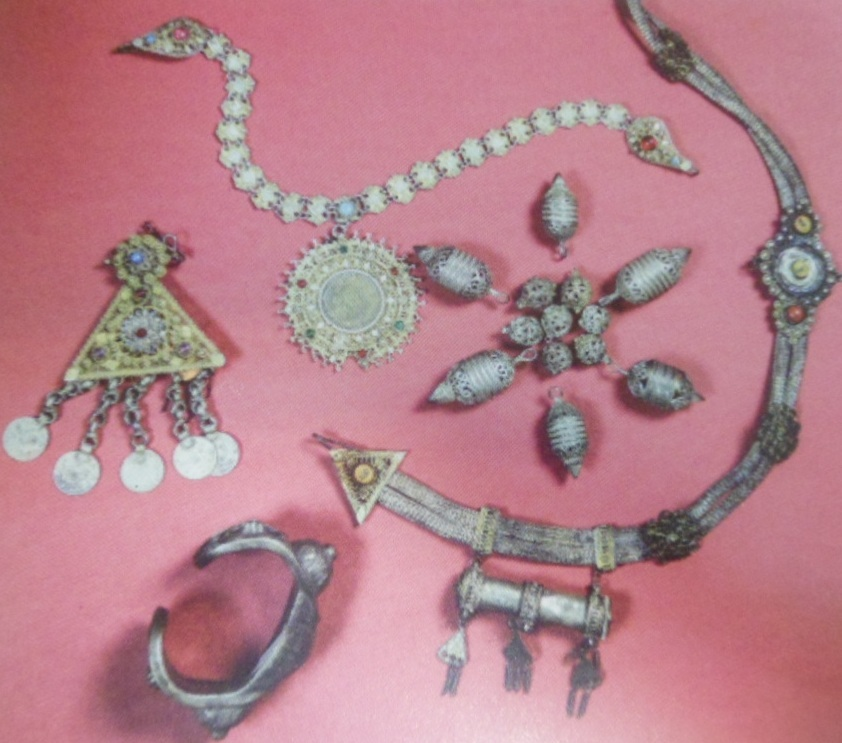
Albanian filigree from the 19th and 20th centuries.

Body jewellery as a specific type of our ethno-culture, in a particular manner, depicts the folk arts of this nature and they have been extended broadly as artistic productions amongst Albanian people. Thus the values under the possession of the institution (Museum) and 230 exhibits of this treasure which have been shown by the fund of the Museum of Kosovo as selected, were sent to Belgrade for a temporary exhibition in 1998.. They are of a complex, unique, and artistic profile, with multi-dimensional values. At the same time, they illustrate the layered historical nature of this segment of material and spiritual ethno-culture of the people in a complex manner by also involving the artistic and artisanal character, which has been built in a special manner amongst Albanian people. These treasures contain qualitative specifics because they are accompanied by elements that have played a non-portrait role; a component that has been preserved as an element of spiritual culture since pre-history until today in all Albanian ethnic backgrounds. Treasure of body jewelry in the aspect of the construction of motifs are made simply with classical tools but through which their complex meaning diversity is shown, and the harmonized arrangement of ornamentals is a perfect shape in which the objects belonging different ages, and through which that present motif where people's beliefs of the tradition are involved, the youth love, family love, love for the successors, the love for spouse and national symbols, symbols people's faith related to cult and other accessory elements intermingled in them.

== Musical instruments ==
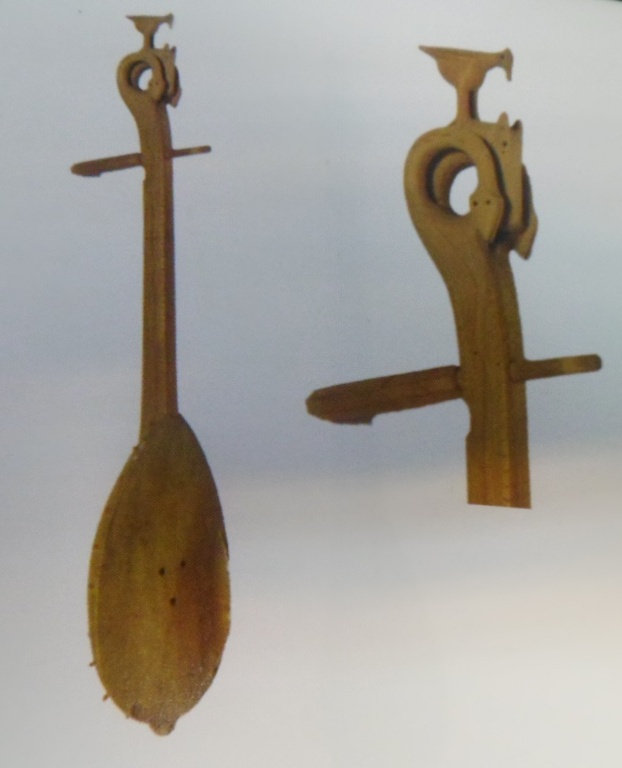
Lahuta, a chordophone instrument, 20th century

Since the existence of mankind, the beauty of artistic creation as well, where except the basic life needs, the human being also feels the need for amusement. Initially, the musical instruments were casual products, afterwards they took their practical function. The human spirit loves dancing, songs, and melodies of folk instruments which were inherited through generations for centuries, in order to find this delight, joy, and relaxation from the daily life matters. Amusement from instruments of folk art has been a school of noble and patriotic education of the people. It was at the same time a preserver and developer of the cultural heritage of the people for centuries, it has been an archive of folk memories of the history of the past generations. Although, not a highly educated people, it had its poets, prose, writers, humor artists, orators, and its bright actors, although a part of them remained anonymous; it had generous composers and dancers. The folklore art of the word, sounds of rhythms and dancing and musical instruments has been a powerful force of cohesion, amongst some other essential occurrences, which held this collectiveness as united, preserving it not to disintegrated and absorbed by cultures of other cultures or invading peoples The folk genius not only has he created and interpreted musical works, but he has also produced and still continues to produce them. In this case, it should be mentioned that musical instruments like the lute are made for a long life amongst people and it is undoubtedly considered one of the oldest in the Balkan Peninsula, but it belongs to the Albanian people, and it has been produced and invented for the first time by this people. According to the discoveries from archaeological digging, an interesting musical instrument has also been found, which is called ocarina. It dates back to the early Neolithic and was found in the village of Runik in the municipality of Skenderaj.

== See also ==
- Pristina
- Kosovo Museum
- Tourism in Kosovo
- History of Kosovo
- Albanians
