= Brezovica ski resort =

Ski resort in Kosovo

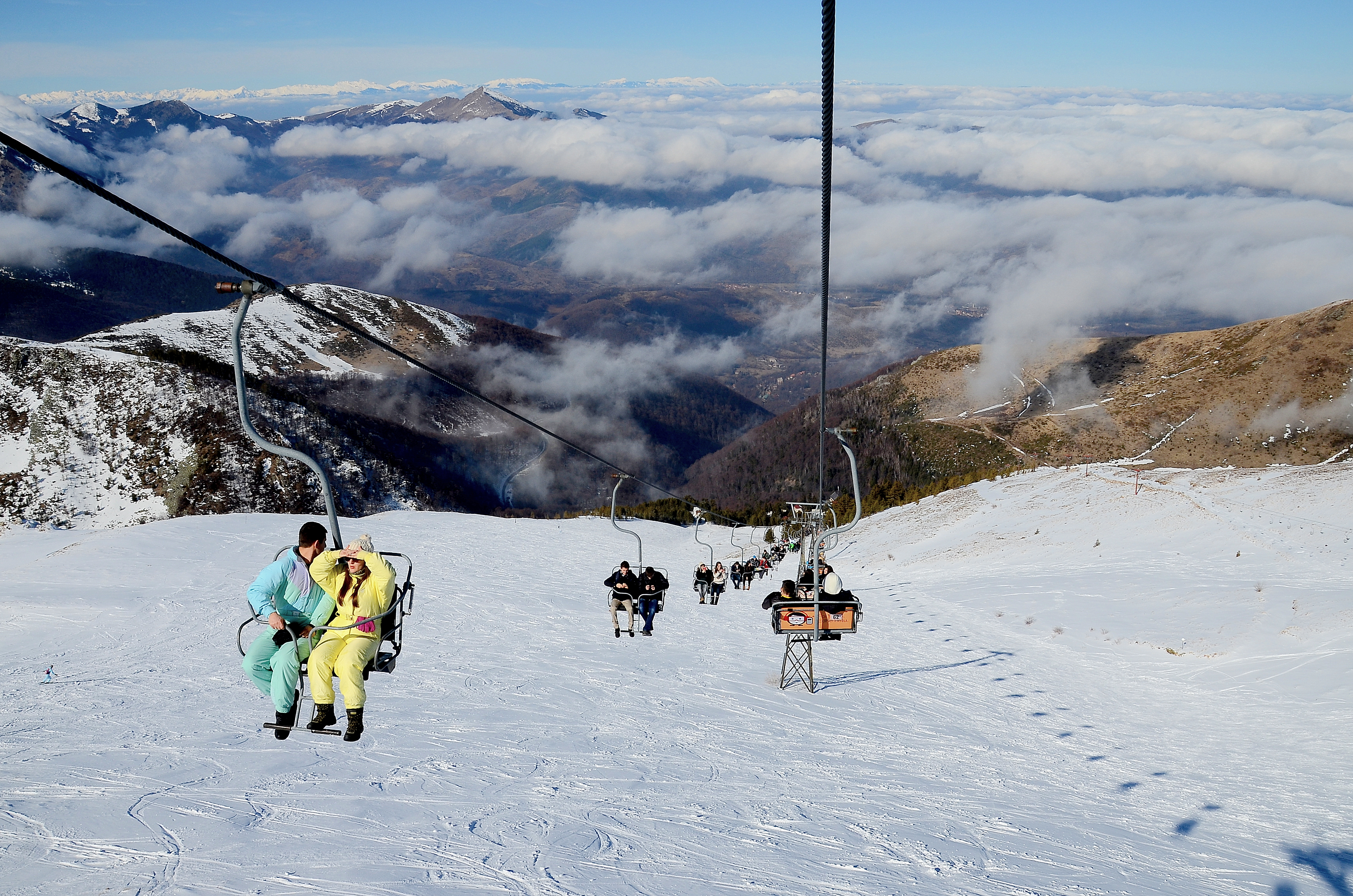
- Brezovica ski resort
- Interactive map of Brezovica ski resort
- Location: Sharr Mountains
- Nearest city: Brezovica, municipality of Štrpce, Kosovo
- Coordinates: 42°13′19″N 21°00′17″E
- Status: Active
- Top elevation: 2,212 m (7,257 ft)
- Skiable area: 15.6 km (9.7 mi)
- Trails: 9
- Longest run: 3.5 km (2.2 mi)
- Lift system: 9 total
- Lift capacity: 10,000/hour
- Snowfall: 128 days
- Website: www.brezovica-ski.net

Brezovica ski resort or Brezovica ski center (Albanian: Qendra e Skijimit Brezovicë, Serbian: Ски-центар Брезовица / Ski-centar Brezovica) is a mountain resort and the largest center of winter tourism in Kosovo. Located on the slopes of the Sharr Mountains, it is mainly a destination for skiing and snowboarding. In the summer, eco-tourism opportunities include hiking, mountain biking, golf, and other outdoor recreational activities. Hiking paths can lead the visitors to the nearby Livadh Lake.

== History ==
Brezovica ski resort was established in 1954. The ski resort area is ideally situated on the north and northwest-facing slopes of the Sharr Mountains National Park. The first of five chairlifts to the resort was installed in 1979. The resort features 16 kilometers of ski slopes located on the north and northeast facing slopes of the Sharr Mountains.

Although Brezovica served as an alternative site for downhill skiing events of the 1984 Sarajevo Winter Olympic Games and hosted a number of International Ski Federation events in the 1980s and 1990s, the resort has not received significant infrastructure investments for more than two decades.

The legal status of Brezovica ski resort was disputed since the 1999 Kosovo War, as both the Government of Serbia and Government of Kosovo claim that they have property rights over it. This resulted in lack of investments for more than two decades.

In November 2014, the government of Kosovo signed a 410 million euros contract with French consortium led by Compagnie des Alpes, to develop Brezovica ski resort over next two decades. However, in June 2016, the contract was cancelled as the French consortium could not provide bank guaranties for the investments.

As of 2018, most of the tourists are coming from Serbia, Kosovo and Macedonia.

In 2021, a corruption scandal involving the resort emerged, whereby municipal officials received large bribes in exchange for turning a blind eye to the construction of hotels and villas within an officially protected zone of the resort. In April 2023, a trial of 11 defendants began. One was subsequently granted a plea agreement and declared a cooperating witness.

== Gallery ==
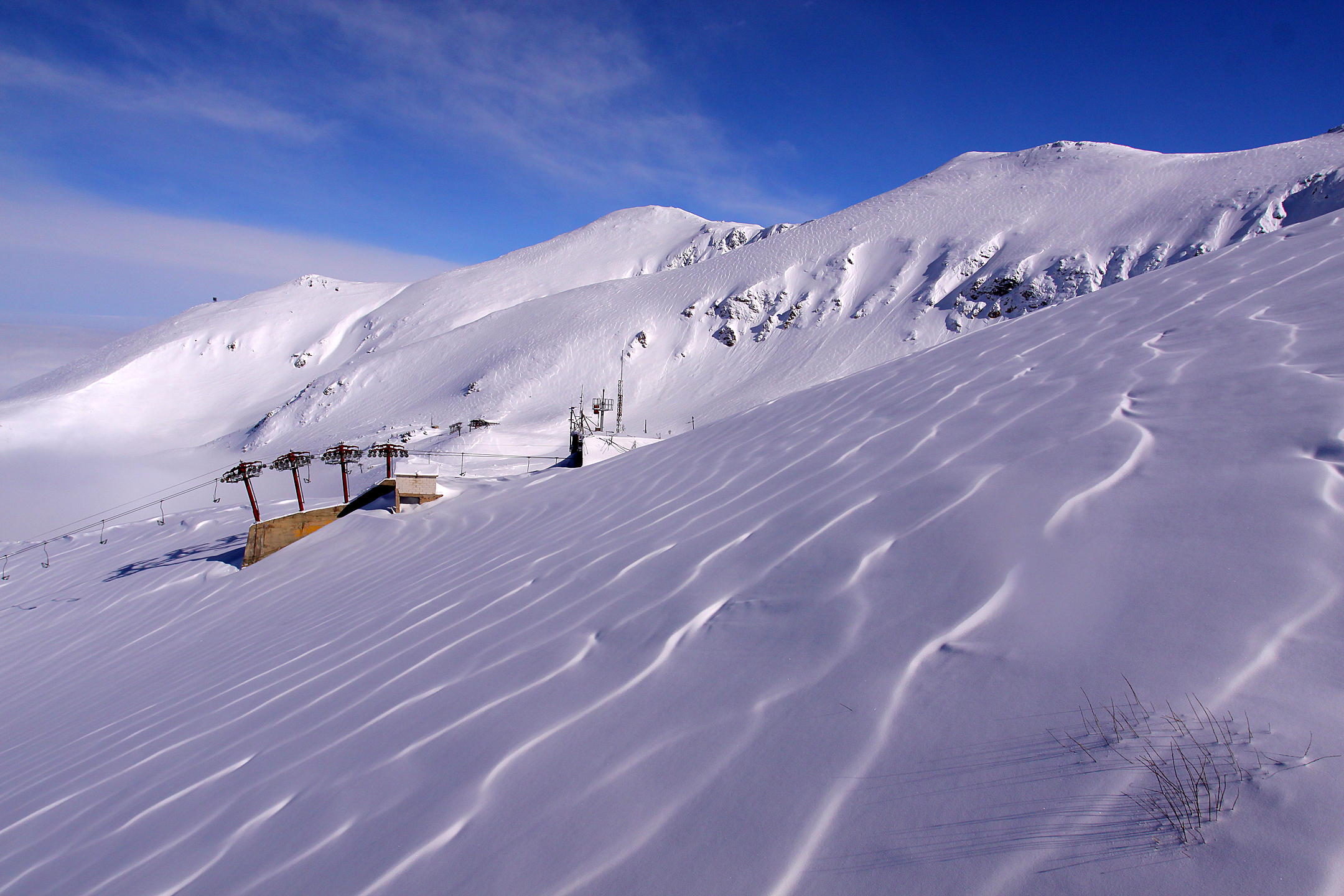
Top station of the „Karaula“ single seater chairlift, and the upper part od the „Velike Livade“ ski slope

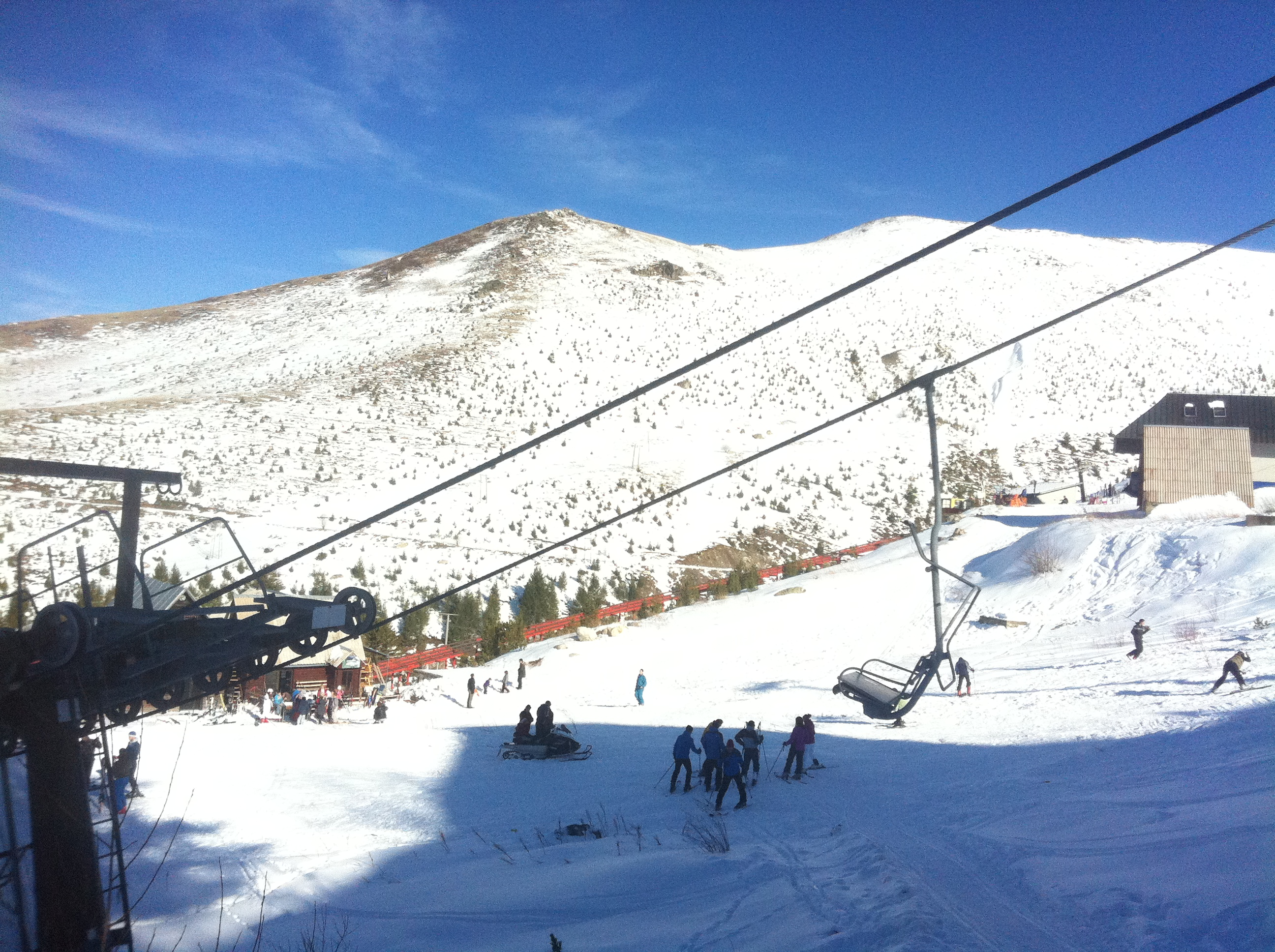
„Velike Livade“ double seater chairlift, near the bottom station

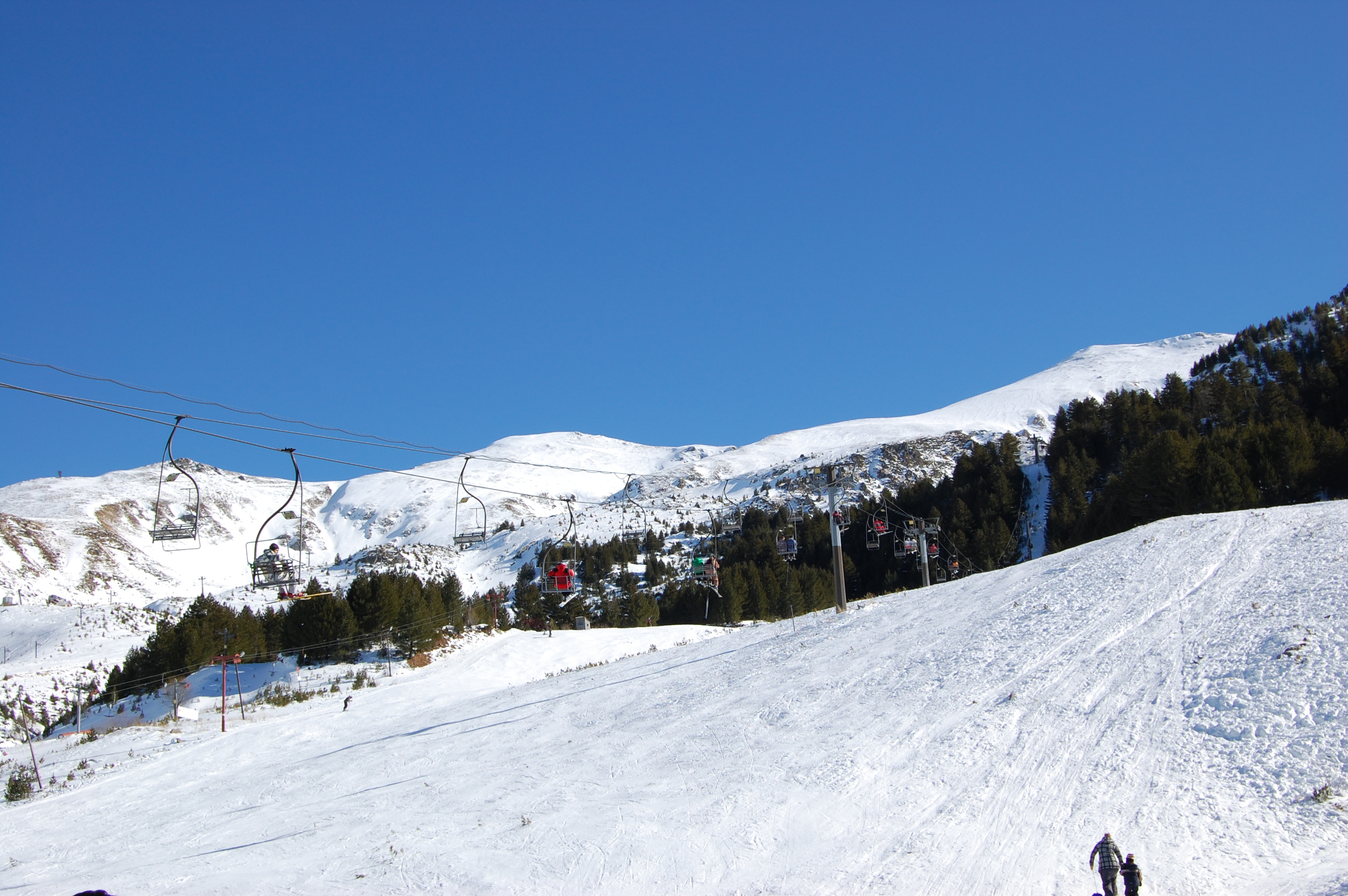
„Lavlja Vrata“ double seater chairlift, near the base station, and the „Bačila“ T-br ski lift with the „Bačila“ ski slope.

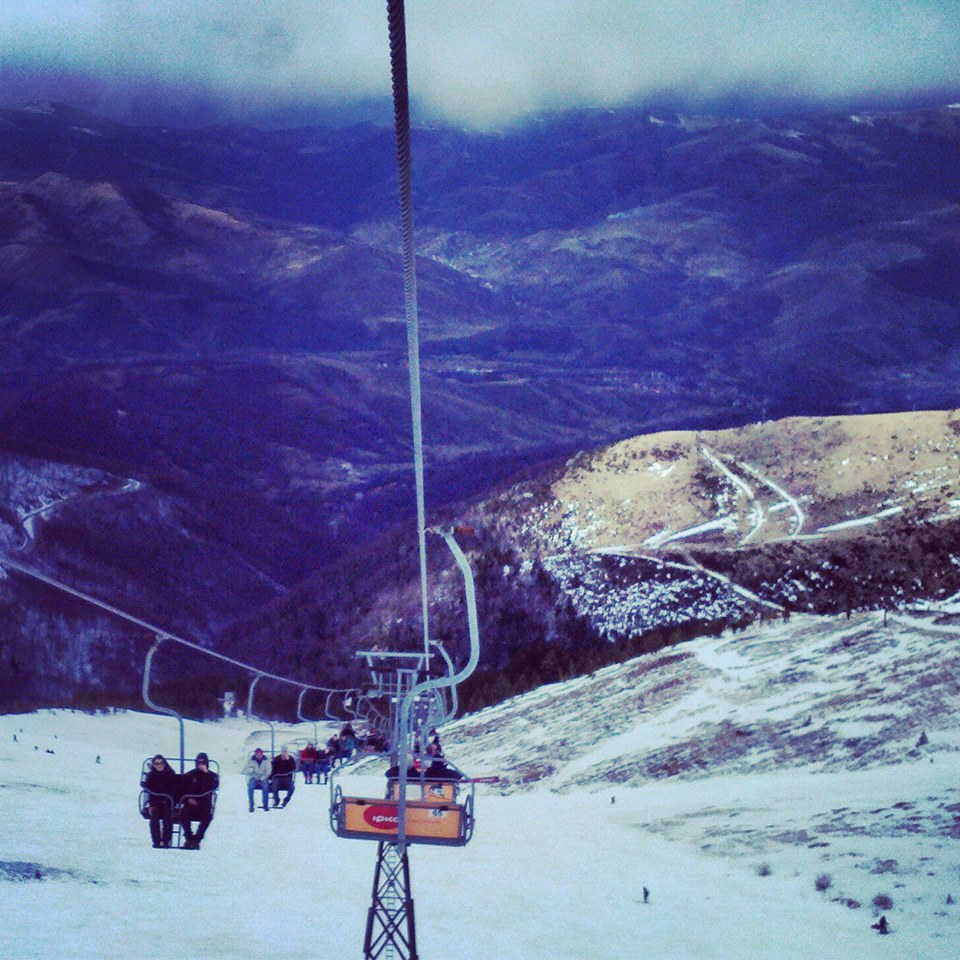
„Velike Livade“ double seater chairlift, and „Velike Livade“ ski slope, near the top station

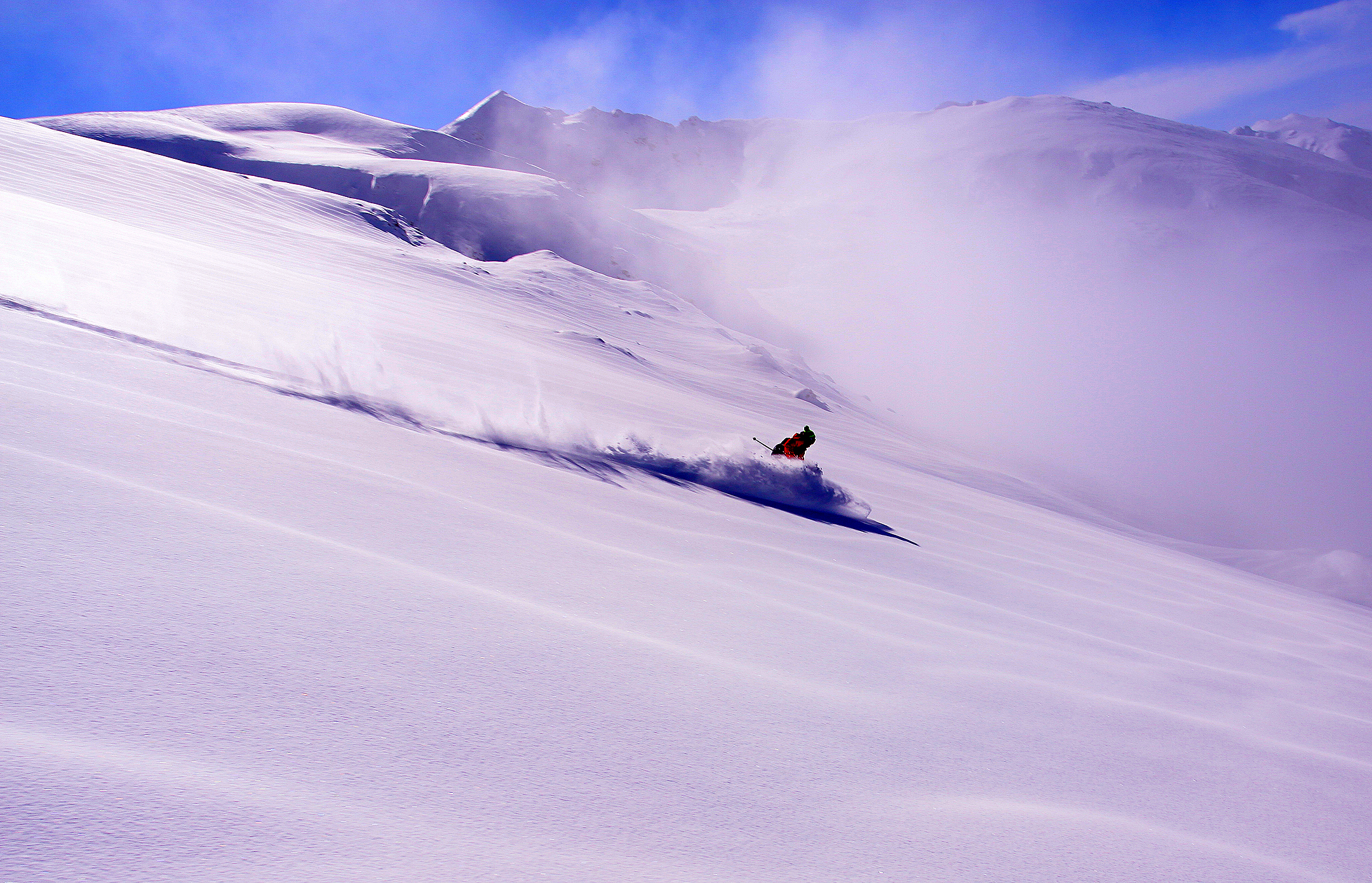
Skiing off piste

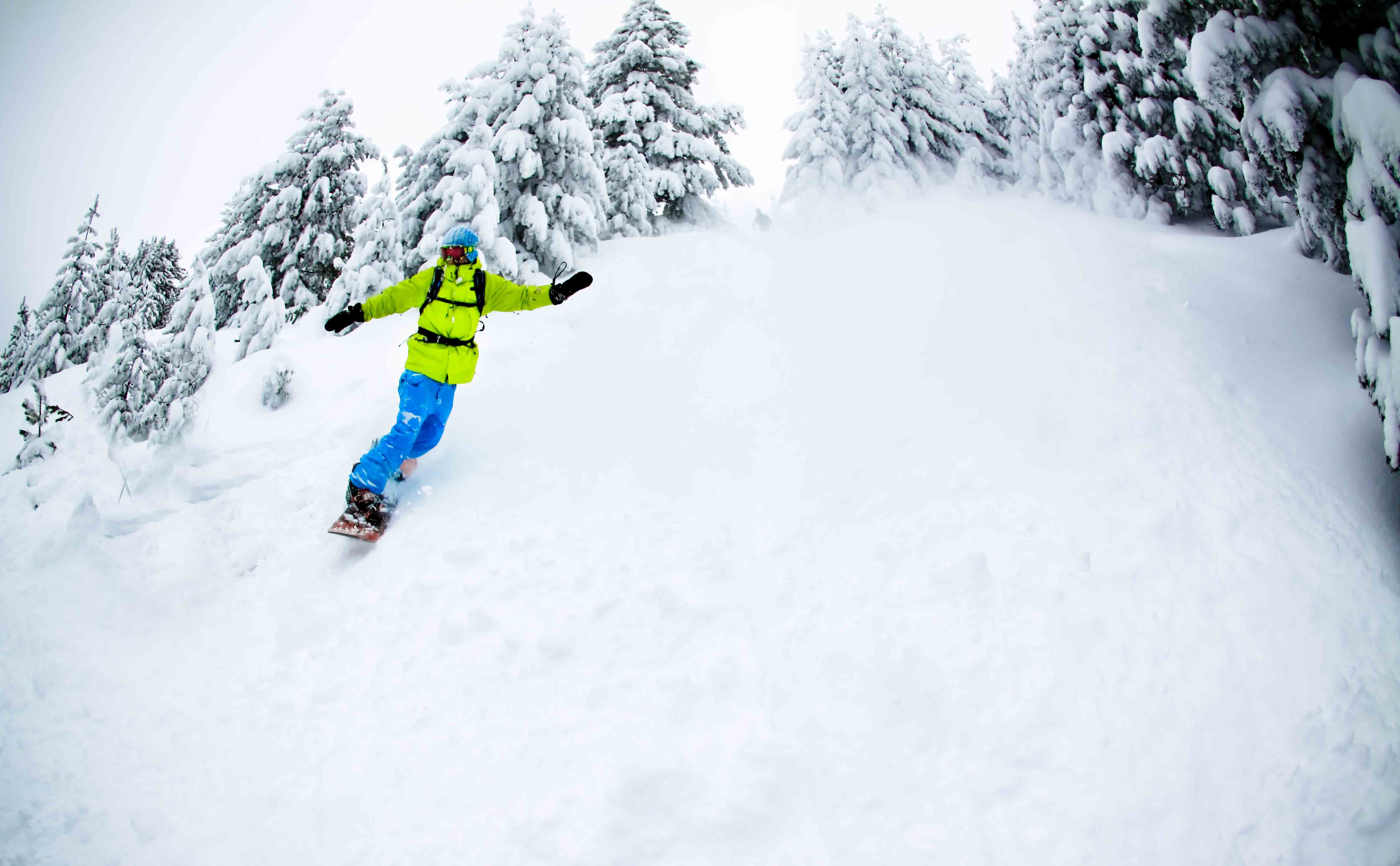
Snowboarding off piste

== Features ==
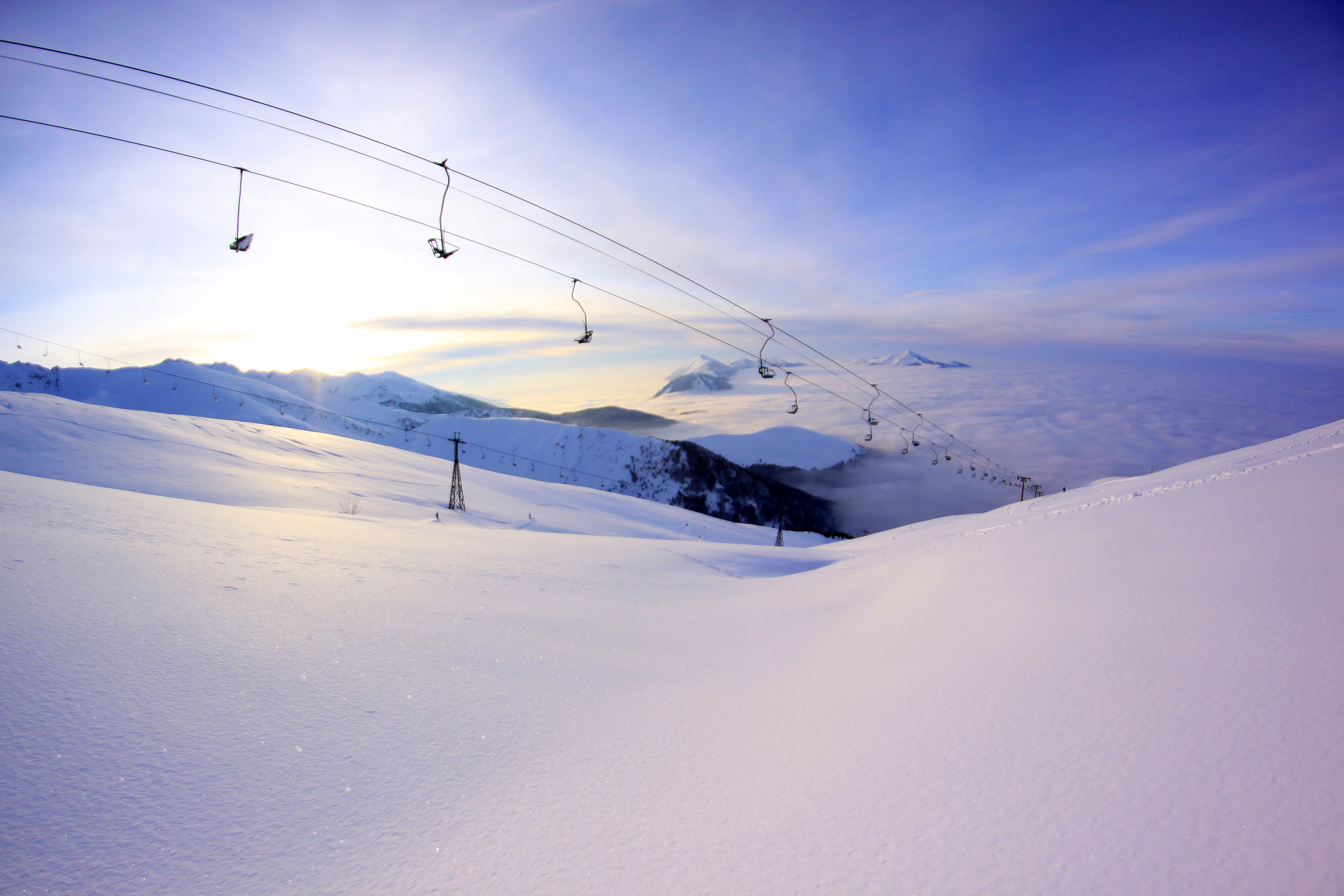
Brezovica ski resort landscape

The ridge line spans 39,000 hectares of high alpine mountain terrain and forests, with a highly diverse and abundant flora and fauna. Located within 90 minutes of two international airports (Pristina International Airport Adem Jashari and Skopje International Airport), the Brezovica resort area represents one of the last remaining under-developed ski resort areas in Southeast Europe. Inside of this area are ski slopes with maximum length of 3,5 km and an average incline of 38%, with the lowest lift station at 1718 meters above se level. The upper station highest chairlift is at a height of 2522 meters above sea level. Ski center Brezovica is open for skiing during the seasons, where in summer its surface is covered with snow, with a low exploitation possibility. Wide ski terrains of the Ski Centre Brezovica are made of a system that includes: five chair lifts and 5 ski lifts, connected with 16 km (10 mi) of ski slopes of the average length 3,000 meters. Three new lifts opened in 2008. On Brezovica FIS slopes for slalom, giant slalom, downhill race and Super G simultaneously could ski 50,000 skiers.

A number of successful national and international competitions are held at the resort, including the Belgrade-owned "Inex ski center Brezovica", among others. A number of Kosovo winter sport teams train at the resort. A major investment from MDP Consulting Compagnie des Alpes is expected to have a significant impact in the area concerning environmental issues.

Wide ski terrains of the Brezovica ski resort are made of a system that includes: 5 chair lifts and 5 ski lifts, connected with 16 km of ski slopes of the average length 3,000 meters. On Brezovica, there are FIS approved slopes for slalom, giant slalom, downhill race and Super G and simultaneously could ski 50,000 skiers.

The ski slopes have an average length of 4 kilometers and an average of 128 skiable days per year.

The ski centre has around 700 beds in four hotels, while additional accommodation possibilities exist in independent hotels and private facilities. However, these hotels are either operating minimally or are closed due to legal disputes between Government of Serbia and Government of Kosovo. Hotel clients have free transportation and free access to ski lifts. The construction of private houses is booming in the area despite it being a national park.

== Chairlifts and Ski lifts ==
The following is a list of the resort's chairlifts and ski lifts:

=== Chairlifts ===
1. „Karaula“

 - type: single seater chairlift
 - altitude of bottom station: 1732 m
 - altitude of top station: 2191 m
 - vertical rise: 459 m
 - length: 1186 m
 - total incline: 40% (21,8°)
 - speed: 3 m/s
 - transit time: 10 min.
 - capacity: 900 persons/hour
 - manufacturer: Graffer
 - currently out of service

2. „Piri Breg“

 - type: double seater chairlift
 - altitude of bottom station: 2266 m
 - altitude of top station: 2522 m
 - vertical rise: 236 m
 - length: 521 m
 - total incline: 53% (27,92°) 
 - speed: 2,5 m/s
 - transit time: 4 min.
 - capacity: 1200 persons/hour
 - manufacturer: Gimar Montaz Mautino
 - currently out of service

3. „Lavlja Vrata“

 - type: double seater chairlift
 - altitude of bottom station: 1718 m
 - altitude of top station: 2147 m
 - vertical rise: 429 m
 - length: 1428 m
 - total incline: 32% (17,74°) 
 - speed: 2,5 m/s
 - transit time: 10 min.
 - capacity: 1200 persons/hour

4. „Crvena Karpa“

 - type: double seater chairlift
 - altitude of bottom station: 1891 m
 - altitude of top station: 2264 m
 - vertical rise: 373 m
 - length: 1269 m
 - total incline: 31% (17,22°) 
 - speed: 2,5 m/s
 - transit time: 8 min.
 - capacity: 1200 persons/hour
 - currently out of service

5. „Velike Livade“

 - year of construction: 1993
 - type: double seater chairlift
 - altitude of bottom station: 1720 m
 - altitude of top station: 2202 m
 - vertical rise: 482 m
 - length: 1258 m
 - total incline: 42% (22,78°)
 - speed: 2,5 m/s
 - capacity: 1500 persons/hour
 - transit time: 9 min.
 - Manufacturer: Girak

=== Ski-lifts ===
1. „Bačila“

 - type: T bar, surface ski-lift
 - altitude of bottom station: 1730 m
 - altitude of top station: 1803 m
 - vertical rise: 73 m
 - length: 301 m
 - total incline: 25% (14,04°)
 - speed: 3 m/s
 - capacity: 650 persons/hour
 - transit time: 1,5 min.

2. „Munika“

 - type: Detachable platter, surface ski-lift
 - altitude of bottom station: 1730 m
 - altitude of top station: 1830 m
 - vertical rise: 95 m
 - length: 454 m
 - total incline: 22% (12,41°)
 - speed: 2,5 m/s
 - capacity: 750 persons/hour
 - transit time: 2,75 min.
 - currently out of service

3. „Grčke Livade“

 - type: Detachable platter, surface ski-lift
 - altitude of bottom station: 2050 m
 - altitude of top station: 2165 m
 - vertical rise: 113 m
 - length: 429 m
 - total incline: 29% (16,17°)
 - speed: 3 m/s
 - capacity: 750 persons/hour
 - transit time: 1,5 min.
 - currently out of service

4. „Berevačke Rupe“

 - type: T-bar, surface ski-lift
 - altitude of bottom station: 2100 m
 - altitude of top station: 2286 m
 - vertical rise: 186 m
 - length: 731 m
 - total incline: 26% (14,57°)
 - speed: 3 m/s
 - capacity: 850 persons/hour
 - transit time: 3 min.
 - currently out of service

5. „Tršenja“

 - type: surface ski-lift
 - altitude of bottom station: 1005 m
 - altitude of top station: 1171 m
 - vertical rise: 166 m
 - length: 556 m
 - total incline: 30% (16,70°)
 - speed: 2,5 m/s
 - capacity: 900 persons/hour
 - transit time: 2,5 min.
 - currently out of service

=== Ski-trails ===
1. „Piribreg“ (served by the „Piri Breg“ chairlift)

 - type: downhill ski course (FIS homologation expired in year 2010)
 - start: 2522 m
 - finish 1722 m
 - vertical drop: 800 m
 - length: 3500 m
 - difficulty: black (advanced or expert)

2. „Velika Livada“ (served by the „Velika Livada“ chairlift)

 - type: slalom, giant slalom and super giant slalom course  (FIS homologation expired in year 2010)
 - start: 2147 m
 - vertical drop: 550 m
 - difficulty: black and red (advanced or intermediate)

3. „Lavlja Vrata“ (served by the „Lavlja Vrata“ chairlift)

 - type: slalom, giant slalom and super giant slalom course  (FIS homologation expired)
 - start: 2202 m
 - vertical drop: 429 m
 - difficulty: black and red (advanced or intermediate)

4. „Crvena Karpa“ (served by the „Crvena Karpa“ chairlift)

 - type: giant slalom and super giant slalom course (FIS homologation expired)
 - start: 2264 m
 - vertical drop: 570 m
 - difficulty: black and red (advanced or intermediate)

5. „Berevačke Rupe“ (served by the „Berevačke Rupe“ ski-lift)

 - type: easy ski slope
 - difficulty: easy (blue)
 - start: 2286 m
 - finish: 2100 m
 - vertical drop: 186 m
 - length: 800 m  

6. „Molika“ (served by the „Munika“ ski-lift)

 - type: easy ski slope
 - difficulty: easy (green)
 - altitude of top station: 1830 m
 - altitude of bottom station: 1730 m
 - vertical rise: 95 m
 - length: 454 m

7. „Grčka Livada“ (served by the „Grčka Livada“ ski-lift)

  - type: easy ski slope
  - difficulty: easy (blue) 
  - altitude of top station: 2165 m
  - altitude of bottom station: 2050 m
  - vertical rise: 113 m
  - length: 500 m

8. „Bačilo“ (served by the „Bačila“ ski-lift)

  - type: easy ski slope
  - difficulty: easy (blue) 
  - altitude of top station: 1803 m
  - altitude of bottom station: 1730 m
  - vertical rise: 73 m
  - length: 301 m

== See also ==
- Tourism in Kosovo
