= Pristina Bus Station =

Bus station in Pristina

Pristina Bus Station Stacioni i Autobusëve në Prishtinë
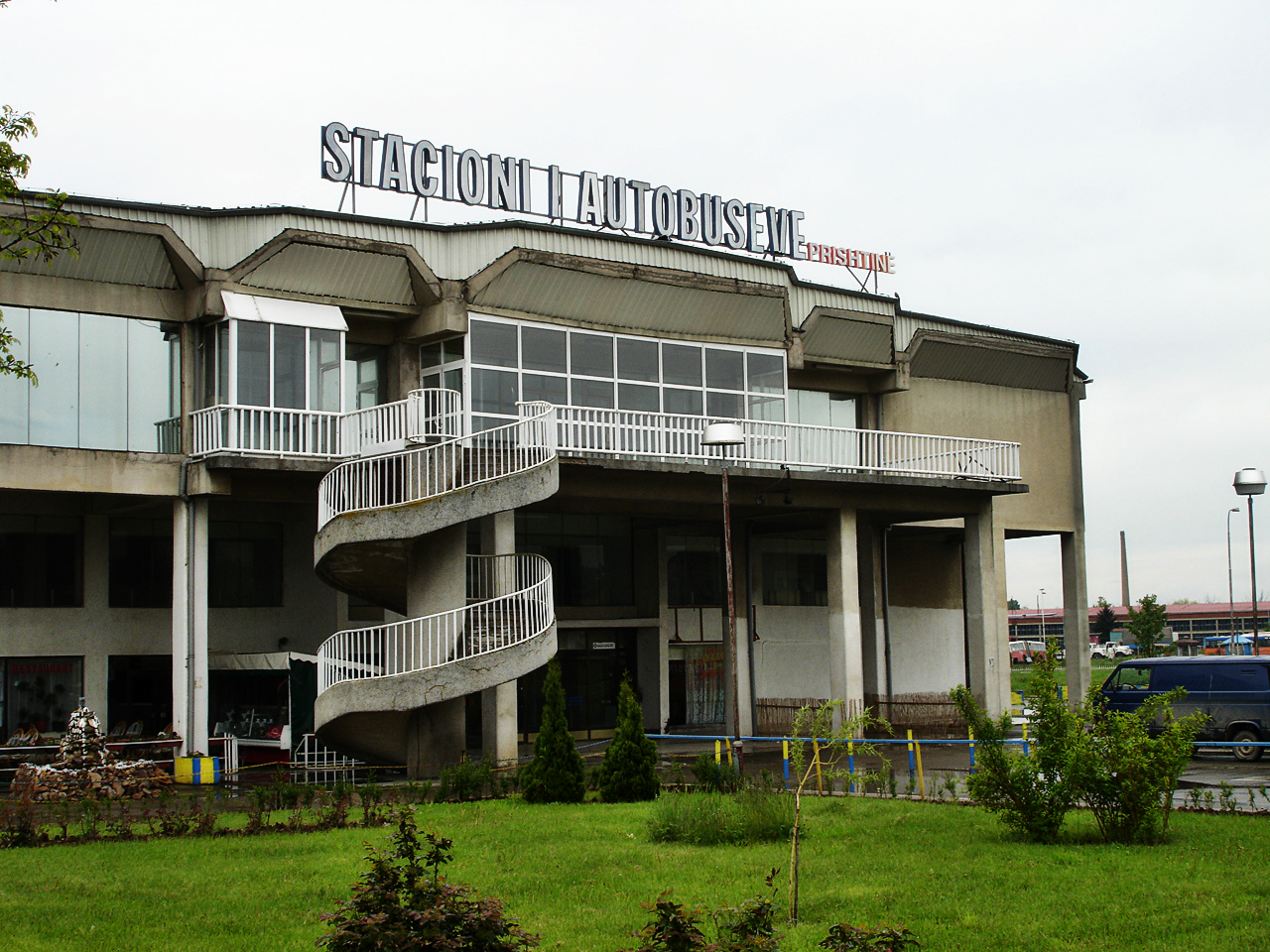

General information
- Coordinates: 42.650307°N 21.146886°E
- Owner: City of Pristina

Other information
- Website: www.sap-rks.com/en/

History
- Opened: 1977; 49 years ago
Location
- Location within Kosovo

Pristina Bus Station is the main bus station in Pristina, Kosovo, 2 km south-west of the city, near Bill Clinton Boulevard. The bus station is composed by a bus depot and bus terminals, responsible to provides transport to the rest of Kosovo and continental destinations.

== History ==
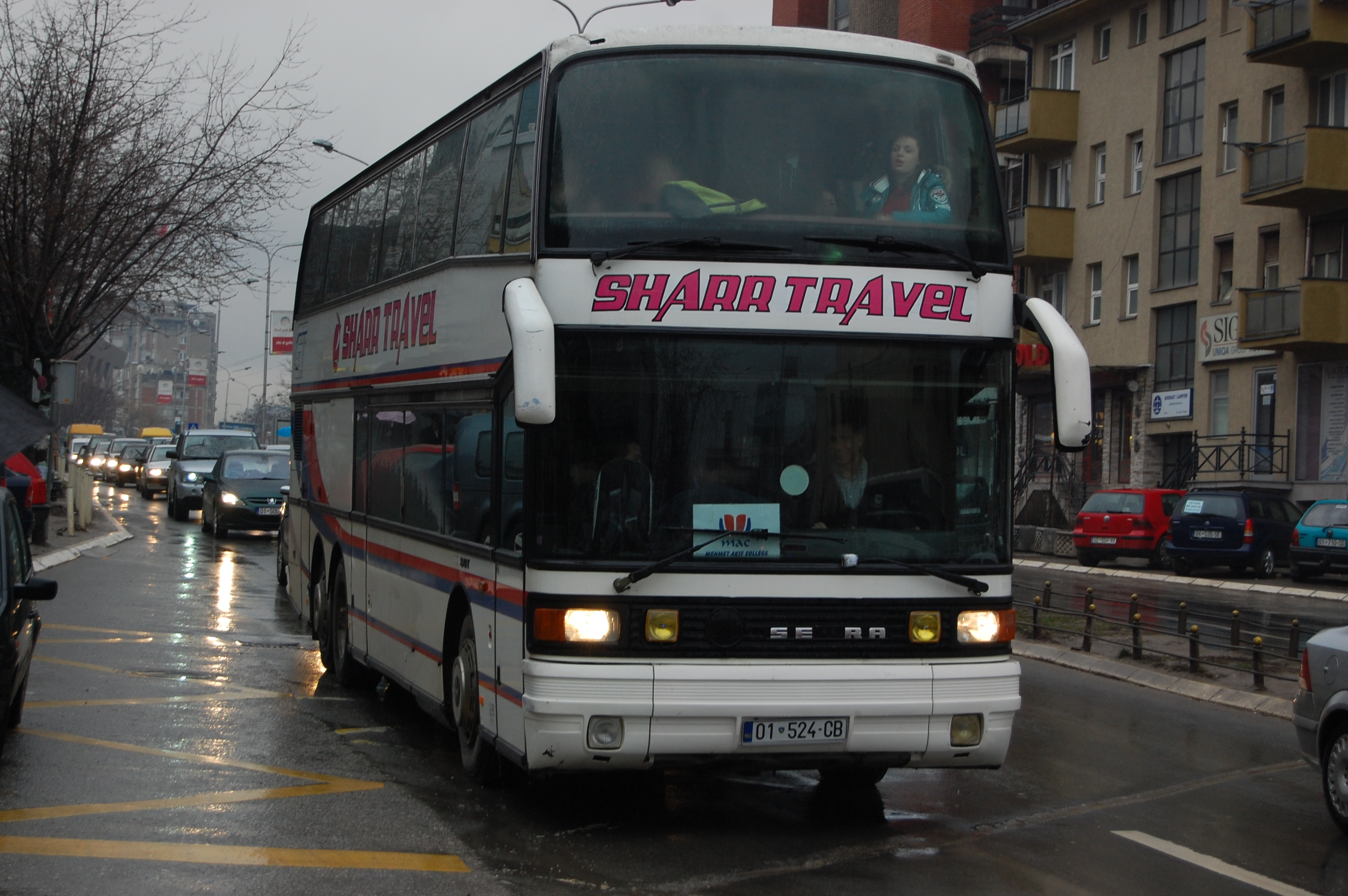
International bus in Pristina

The Pristina Bus Station was established in 1977 by the municipal government, but construction did not begin until 1982. Completed in 1983, it was administered by the Kosovo Trust Agency (Albanian: Agjencia Kosovare e Mirëbesimit) from the Kosovo War until 2015, when the Pristina Municipality took back control.

== Buses ==
=== Interurban buses ===
| Start | End | Price (Euros) | Time |
|---|---|---|---|
| Pristina | Peja | 4.00 | 7:30 Every 20 min |
| Pristina | Gjakova | 4.00 | 7:30 Every 20 min |
| Pristina | Prizren | 4.00 | 7:30 Every 20 min |
| Pristina | Mitrovica | 1.00 or 1.50 | 7:30 Every 20 min |
| Pristina | Gjilan | 2.00 | 7:30 Every 20 min |
| Pristina | Skenderaj | 1.00 or 1.50 | 7:30 Every 20 min |
| Pristina | Ferizaj | 1.00 or 1.50 | 7:30 Every 20 min |
| Pristina | Podujevë | 1.00 or 1.50 | 7:30 Every 20 min |

=== International buses ===
| Start | End | Price (Euros) | Time | Day |
|---|---|---|---|---|
| Pristina | (North Macedonia) Tetovo | 5–10 | 6:30; 9:30 | Monday-Sunday |
| Pristina | (Albania) Tirana | 20–25 | 6:00; 12:00 | Monday-Sunday |
| Pristina | (North Macedonia) Skopje | 5.00 | 7:55; 09:30 | Monday-Sunday |
| Pristina | (Montenegro) Podgorica | 10–15 | 17:45; 23:00 | Monday-Sunday |
| Pristina | (Serbia) Novi Pazar | 5–10 | 8:00; 14:00 | Monday-Sunday |
| Pristina | (Croatia) Zagreb | 15–20 | 4:30; 19:30 | Monday-Sunday |
| Pristina | (Serbia) Belgrade | 10–15 | 11:00; 17:00 | Monday-Sunday |

== See also ==
- Transport in Kosovo
- Transport in Pristina
- Fushë Kosova railway station
- Prishtina International Airport
