= Trafiku Urban =

Operator of public transport buses in Pristina, Kosovo

- Trafiku Urban logo

Overview
- Owner: Municipality of Pristina
- Locale: Pristina, Kosovo
- Transit type: Bus
- Number of lines: 15
- Number of stations: 233
- Daily ridership: 45,000/day
- Website: trafikurban-pr.com

Operation
- Began operation: 1976
- Operator: Municipality of Pristina
- Number of vehicles: 96
System map
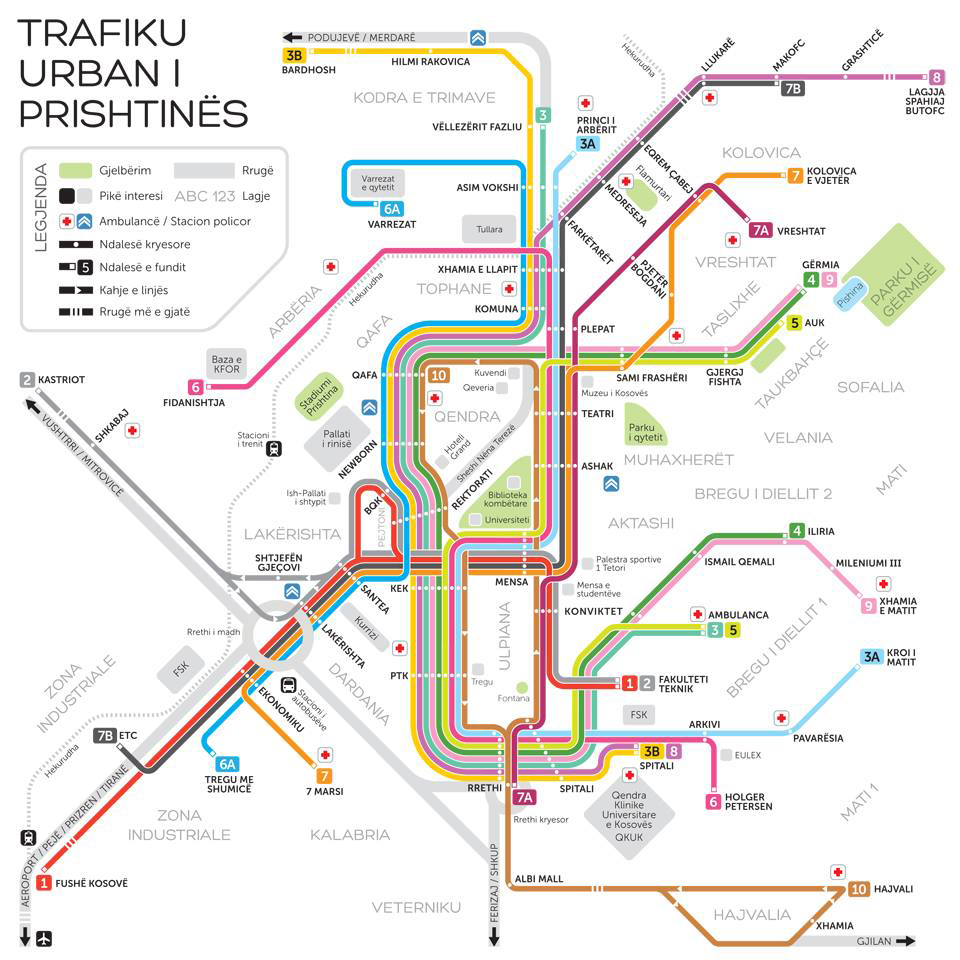

Trafiku Urban (TU) is the public transport company owned by the Municipality of Pristina. It operates with 15 lines in the urban area. Lines are operated through a public-private partnership. In 2016 the Municipality of Pristina purchased 51 new buses for the city, produced by Iveco, in an attempt to modernize the fleet.

== History ==
Trafiku Urban was established on 1 April 1976 by the Municipality of Pristina as a public company. It was developed in the year of rapid development of the city, when new neighborhoods emerged, and an influx of new residents arrived in the city. The buses from 1976 were present until 1999, when some of the lines were privatized. In 2016 the Municipality of Pristina signed a deal with EBRD to buy new buses for the first time since 1976. As part of the deal, a new Sustainable Urban Mobility Plan was commissioned. As of 2018, 51 new buses operate in 15 lines of the urban transport system, with the plan to reorganize into 20 lines by 2019.

The current 15 lines of bus transportation in the city carry approximately 45,000 travelers a day, and 21,600,000 travelers per year. The number is expected to grow through the development by the new Urban Mobility Plan for the city. The measures taken to reduce car usage in the city is considered to have a good impact on bus usage for the city residents, potentially increasing the number of users of the transport system.

=== Urban bus lines ===
| Bus line | Start | End |
|---|---|---|
| 1 | Sunny Hill (Bregu i Diellit) | Fushë Kosovë |
| 1A | Central Bus Station | Pristina International Airport |
| 2 | Technical Faculty | Kastriot (Obilić) |
| 3 | Mati 1 | Bardhosh |
| 3A | Matiçan (Çeshmja) | Kodrën e Trimave |
| 3B | Matiçan | Bardhosh |
| 3C | Bregu i Diellit (Street C) | Sinidoll |
| 4 | Matiçan | Germia Park |
| 6 | Arbëria | Hospital District |
| 6A | Arbëria | Green Market |
| 7 | Kolovica | "7 March" School (Emshir) |
| 7A | "Vreshtat" | Rrethi i Flamurit |
| 7B | Industrial Zone | Makovc |
| 7C | Kalabria | Kalabria (loop route) |
| 8 | Grashticë | University Clinical Center of Kosovo |
| 10 | Hajvalia | Hajvali (loop route) |
| 10C | Prishtina Mall | Prishtina Mall (loop route) |
| 15 | Llapi Mosque | Keqekollë |
| 19 | Pristina | Graçanica / Kišnica |

== See also ==
- Transport in Pristina
