= Transport in Pristina =

Aspect of life in Pristina

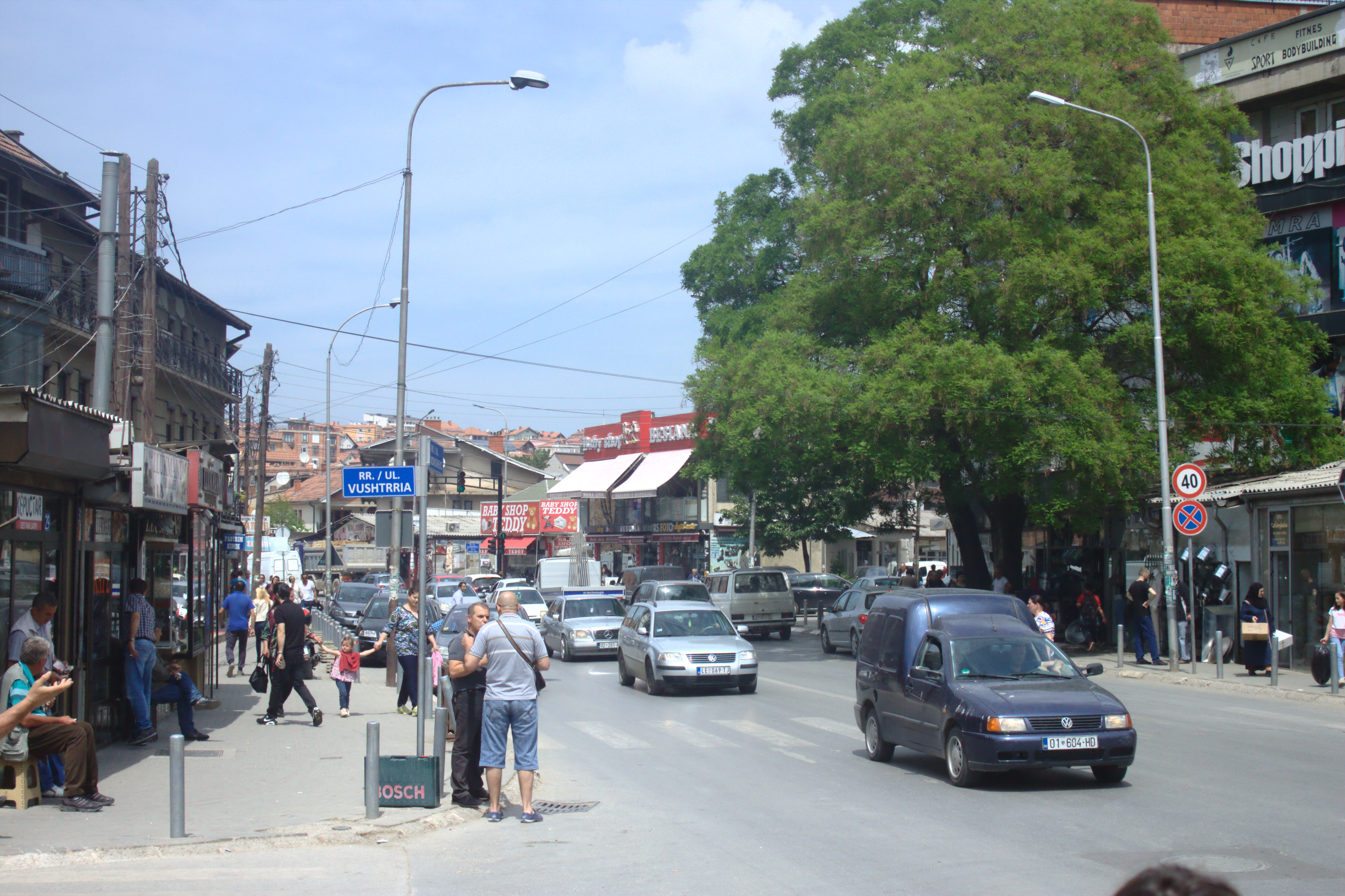
Photo from one of the roads of Pristina

Pristina is the capital of the Republic of Kosovo. Being so, Pristina's transport forms the hub of road, rail and air networks in Kosovo. The city's buses, trains and planes together all serve to maintain a high level of connectivity between Pristina many different districts and beyond. An analysis by the Traffic Police has shown that from 240,000 cars registered in Kosovo, around 100,000 cars (or 41%) are from the District of Pristina.

== Roads ==
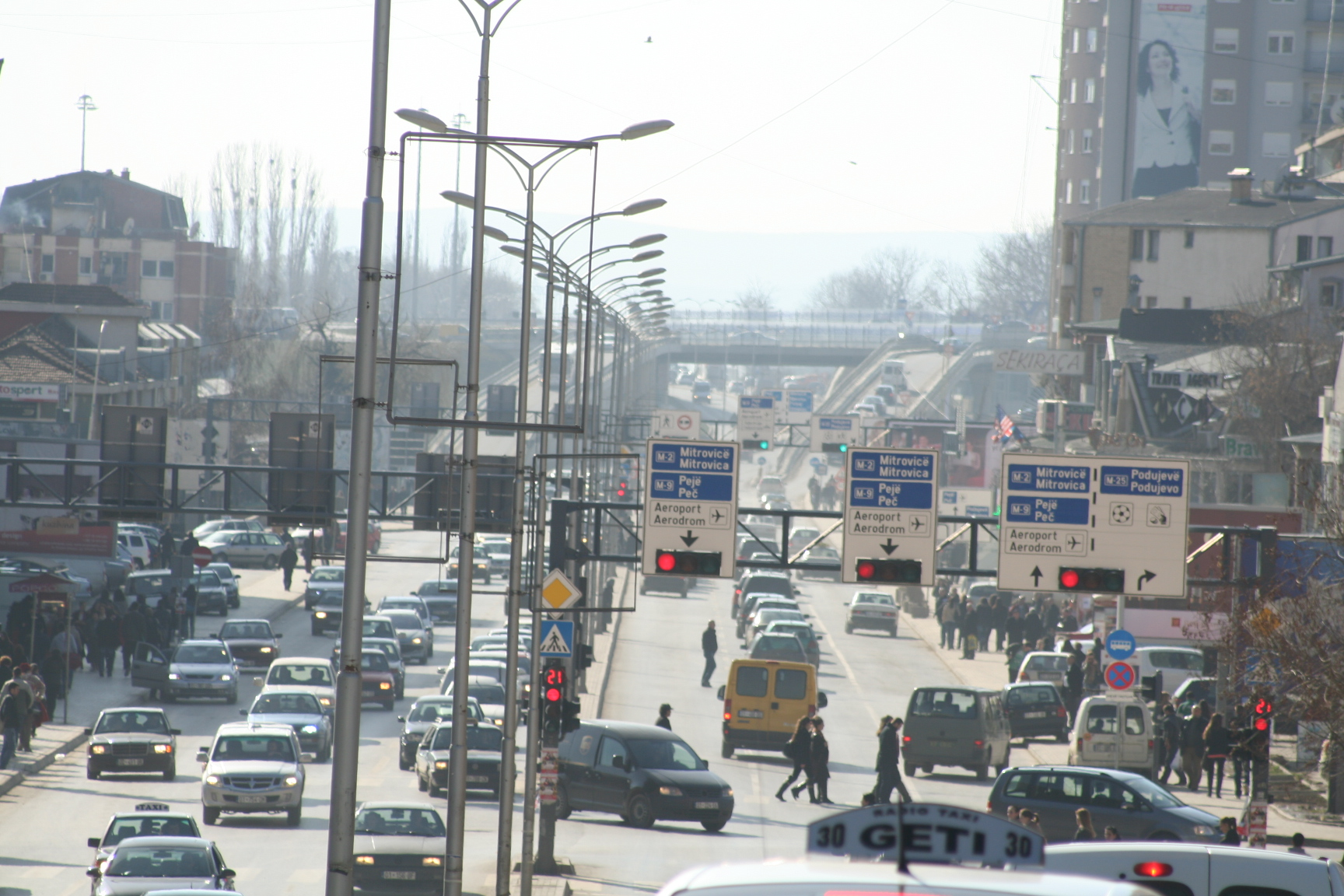
Afternoon in Pristina

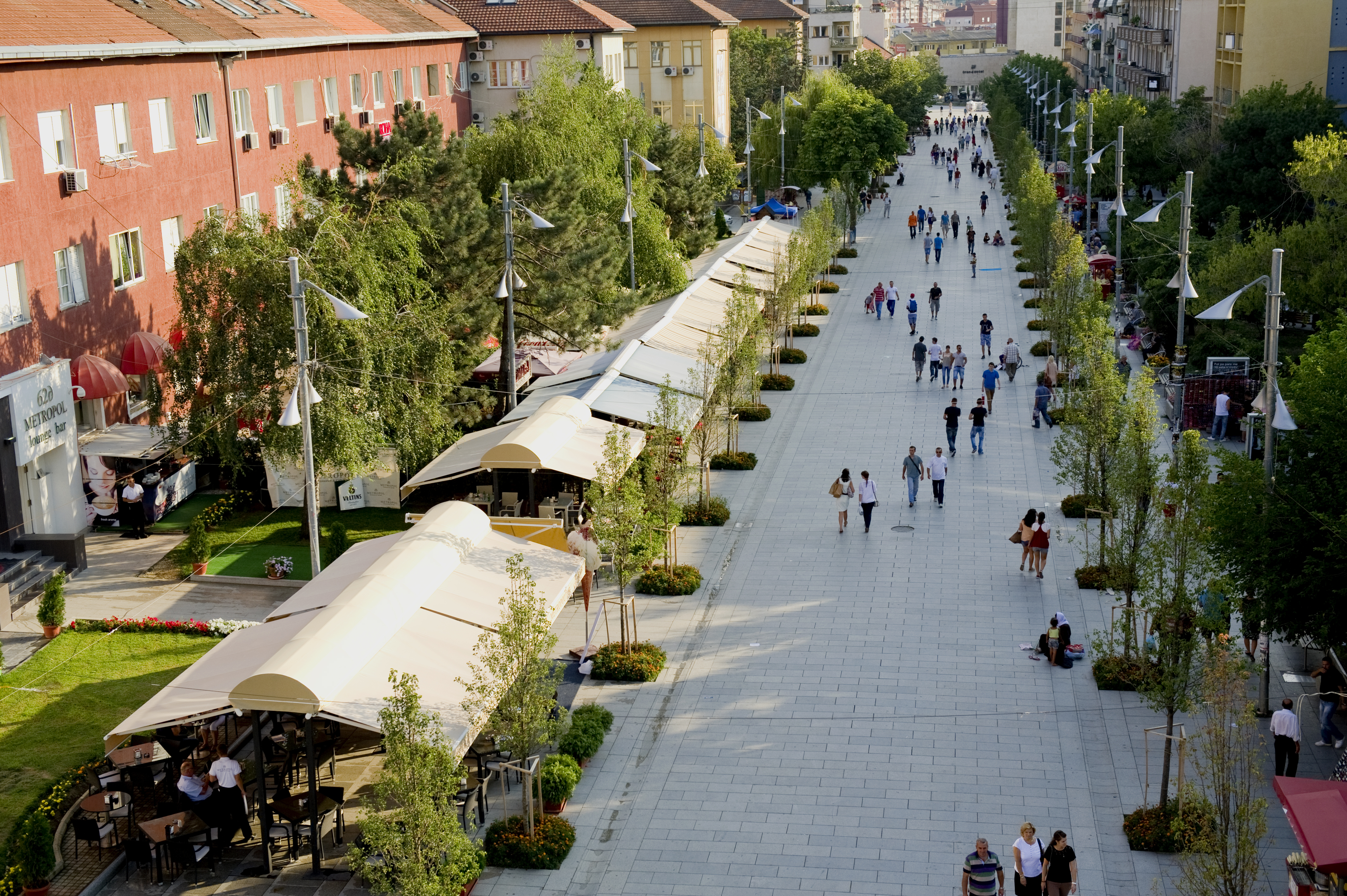
Pedestrians in Pristina, 2013

Roads in Pristina were in bad condition after the Kosovo War, forcing government investment to improve them. Today, all roads that connect the major villages with the urban centre are asphalted. Roads that connect Pristina with other cities form the main routes of Kosovo's network. The M2, which starts from the north with Central Serbia, passes through Pristina and reaches the southern border with North Macedonia, shortly linking Pristina with the Pan European Corridor X. The M25 starts in Niš and passes through Pristina and Prizren, eventually reaching the border with Albania. This road is becoming more important for its south branch, linking Kosovo with Albania, where construction of the Rrëshen – Blinisht – Kukës road is ongoing. The M9 passes through the east administrative line with Central Serbia, through Pristina to Peja to the border with Montenegro.

The circular route around the city of Pristina and Germia Park will serve the villages of Mramor and Lugare, as well as ameliorate traffic heading in the direction of Gjilan and the east side of the city. In addition, the interior circular and the center routes will be created, with the objective to pass through the center of the city. The structure of the axis is intended as a base for a future system of public transport, consisting of buses. This will make an impact on the high number of motorcycles and low private transport. The main routes of the traffic will shift toward Badovc Lake with the existing axis passing through the center, with a direct link to Pristina Airport, and will also pass through the main station in Fushë Kosovë.

=== Road casualties in Kosovo ===
- The following table shows the number of fatal road casualties on the roads of Kosovo, from 2008 to 2011.

	2008	2009	2010	2011
Fatal	118	152	158	129

== Airports ==
Pristina International Airport is located about 15 km south-west of the city. The number of passengers is steadily increasing every year, having handled over 2 million passengers for the first time in 2018. In 2012 it was described as the "most frequented airport of the region". After a decision was made by the Central Department for Public Private Partnership, allowing for concession, the management of PIA has gone under the responsibility of Turkish-French consortium "Limak-Aeroport de Lyon" until 2031.

=== History ===
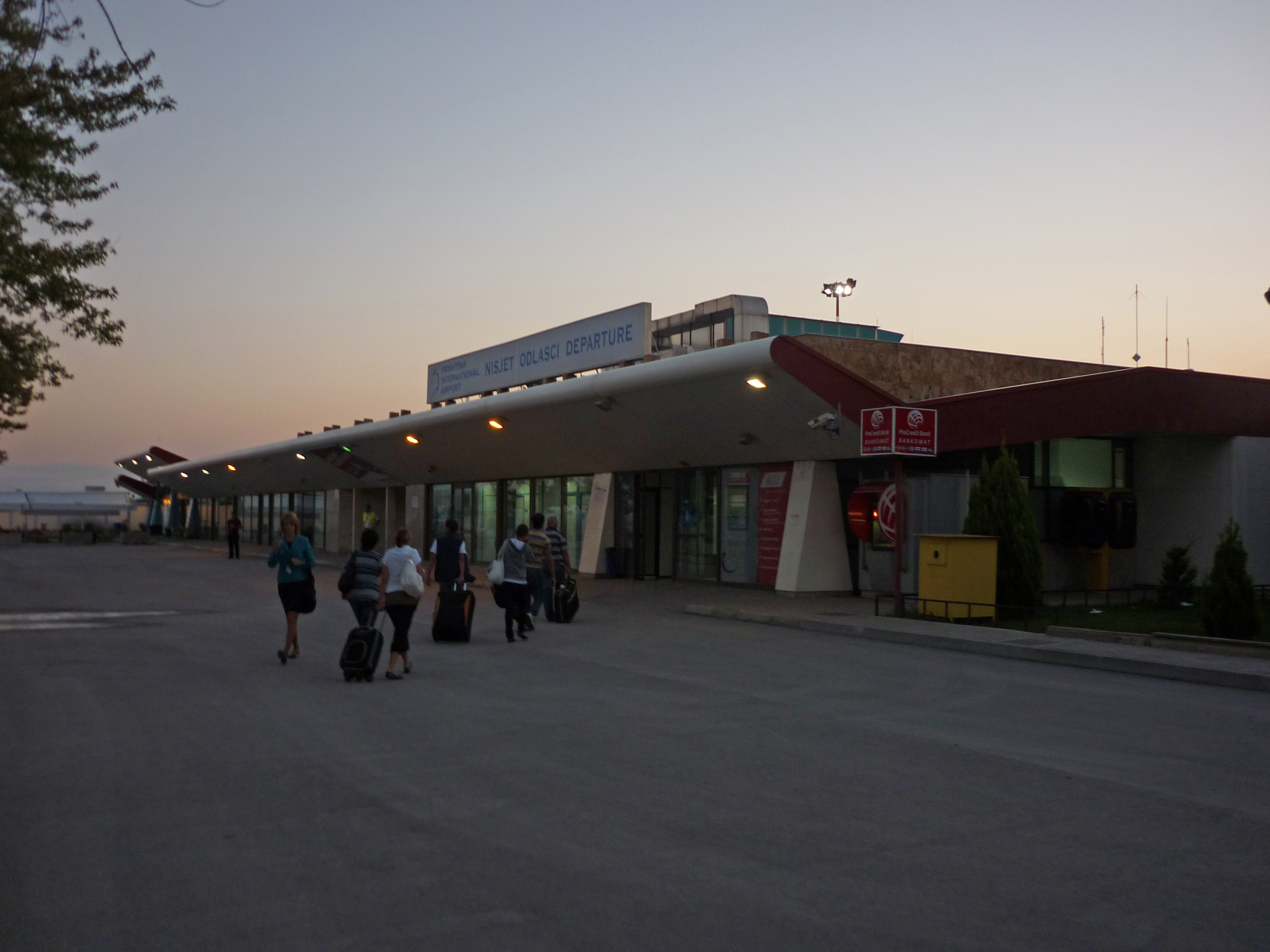
Pristina International Airport Adem Jashari

The history of PIA begins in 1965, when it was opened only for domestic flights to and from Belgrade, the capital of Yugoslavia. In 1985 the IT unit was equipped with modern technology in compliance with ICAO standards. In 1990, it began to handle its first international flights, notably to Germany and Switzerland. A new but short-lived era began for the airport after the Kosovo War, having been taken charge of by NATO and modified as a military airport through KFOR. The airport returned to its own control in 2000, with just 45 employees in total. Following damage during the war, it took 2 years and €50 million to help it start operating properly again. The airport was completely restructured and rebuilt in a 3 year period, from 2002 to 2005, which improved general quality for future passengers. As a result of different projects concerning security and safety, Pristina International Airport Adem Jashari was certified by the Icelandic Civil Aviation Authority in 2008.

=== After concession ===
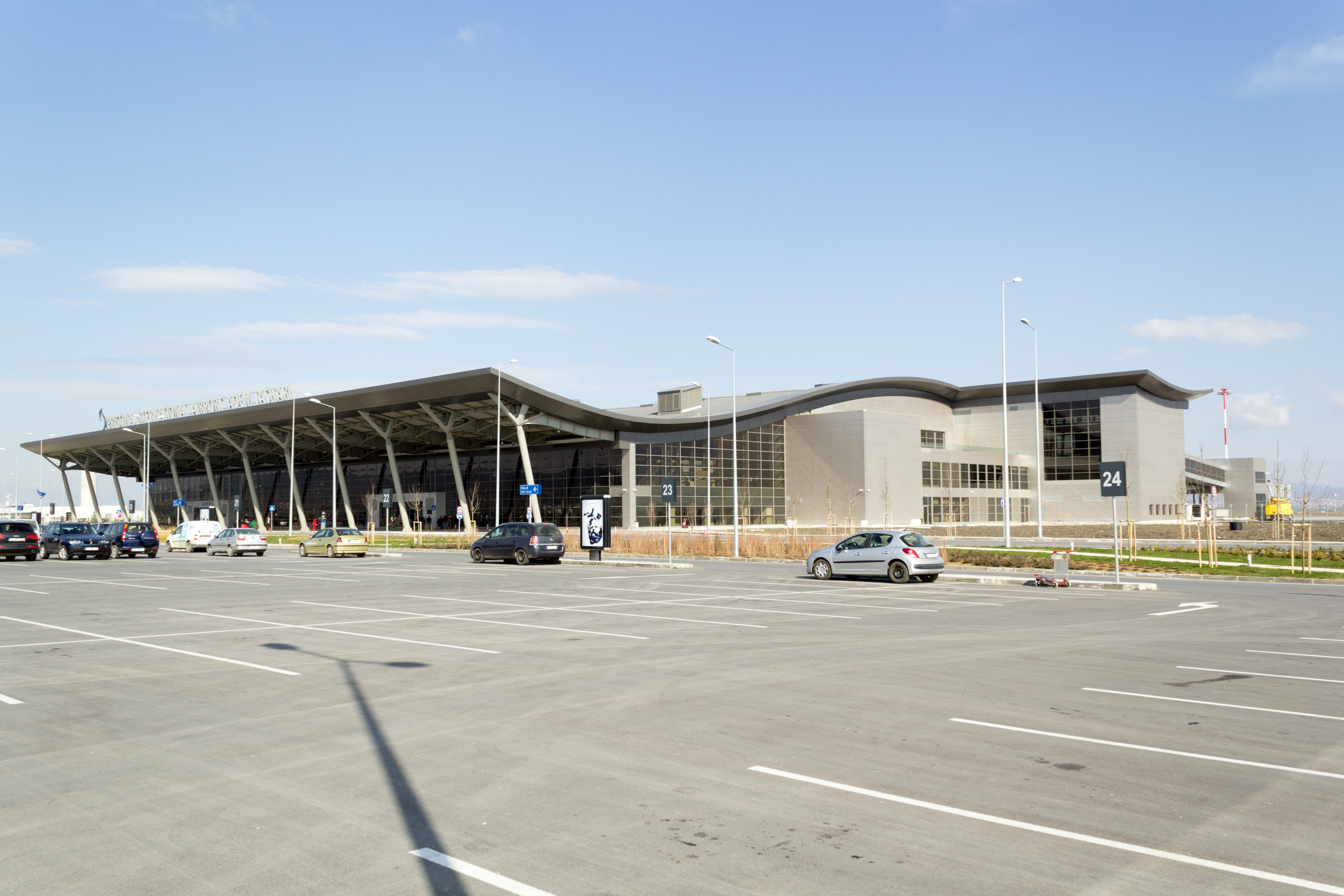
Pristina International Airport Adem Jashari - new terminal

When the airport went under the control of the Turkish-French company "Limak-Aeroport de Lyon", it was planned to be expanded to an area of 25,000 m^{2}, as per investments which totaled €100 million and as agreed by the contract between the Kosovo Government and Limak-Aeroport de Lyon. The investments finished by 2014, by which it had been expanded to an area of 40,000 m^{2}, at a cost of €130 million (15,000 m^{2} and €30 million more than was agreed by the contract), including a new passenger terminal. As a result, the airport now has the capacity to serve more than 3 million passengers per year, with parking space for about 1,700 cars. Following the €130 million investment and the completion of the terminal, the airport is now trying to create a public transport service to bring passengers to and from the capital.

== Pristina Bus Station ==
Buses in Kosovo run frequently. Pristina's bus station provides transport to the rest of Kosovo and continental destinations. The main station is located 2 km south-west of the city, near Bill Clinton Boulevard.

=== Long-distance buses ===
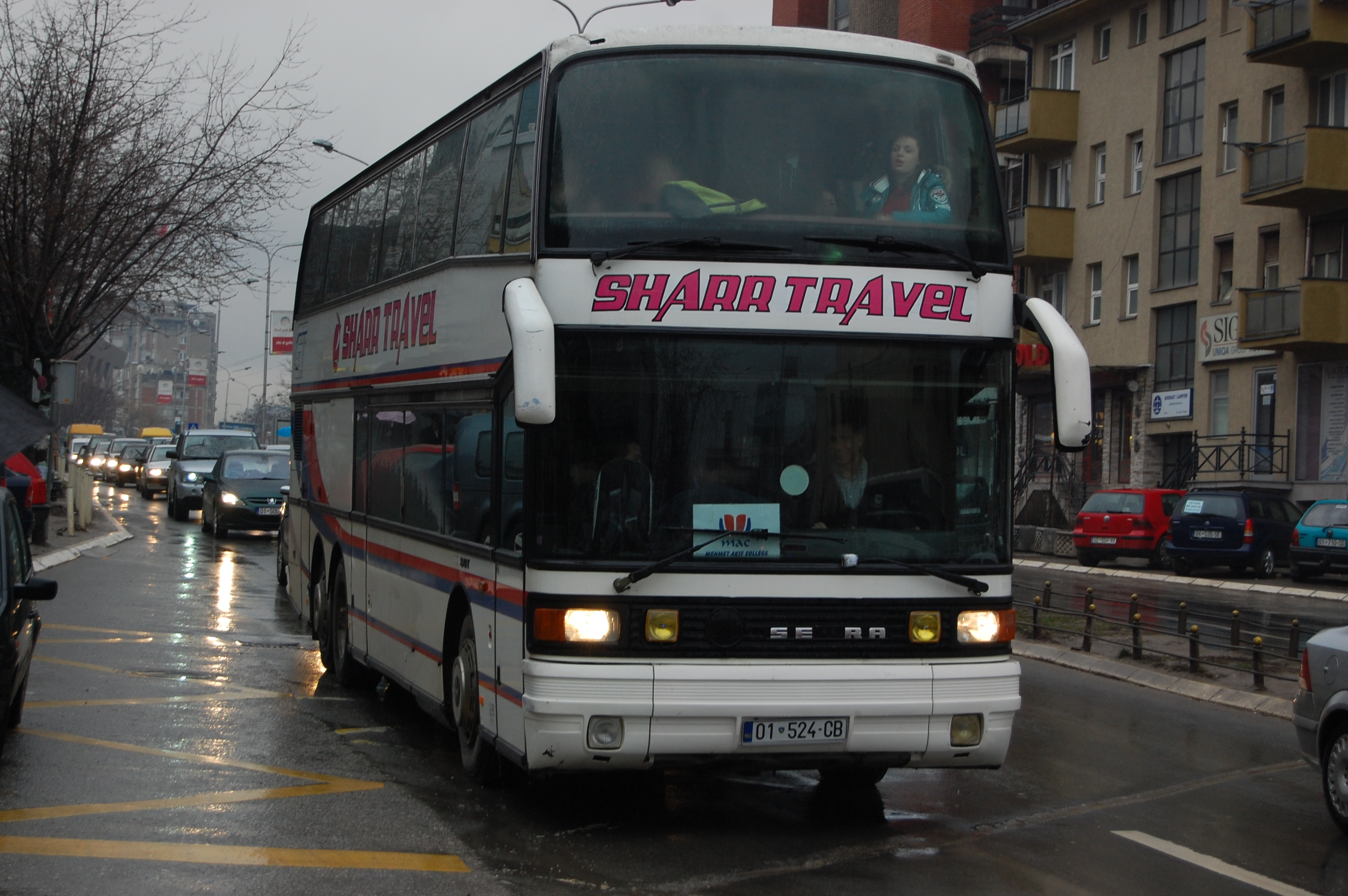
International Bus

Start	End	Price (Euros)	Time
Pristina	Peja	4.00	07:30; every 20 min
Pristina	Gjakova	4.00	07:30; every 20 min
Pristina	Prizren	4.00	07:30; every 20 min
Pristina	Mitrovica	1.00	07:30; every 20 min
Pristina	Gjilan	2.00	07:30; every 20 min
Pristina	Skenderaj	1.50	07:30; every 20 min
Pristina	Ferizaj	2.00	07:30; every 20 min

=== International buses ===
Start	End	Price (Euros)	Time	Day
Pristina	Tetova	5-10	06:30 09:30	Monday-Sunday
Pristina	Tirana	20-25	06:00 12:00	Monday-Sunday
Pristina	Skopje	5.00	07:55 09:30	Monday-Sunday
Pristina	Podgorica	10-15	17:45 23:00	Monday-Sunday
Pristina	Belgrade	10-15	11:00-17:00	

== Public transportation ==
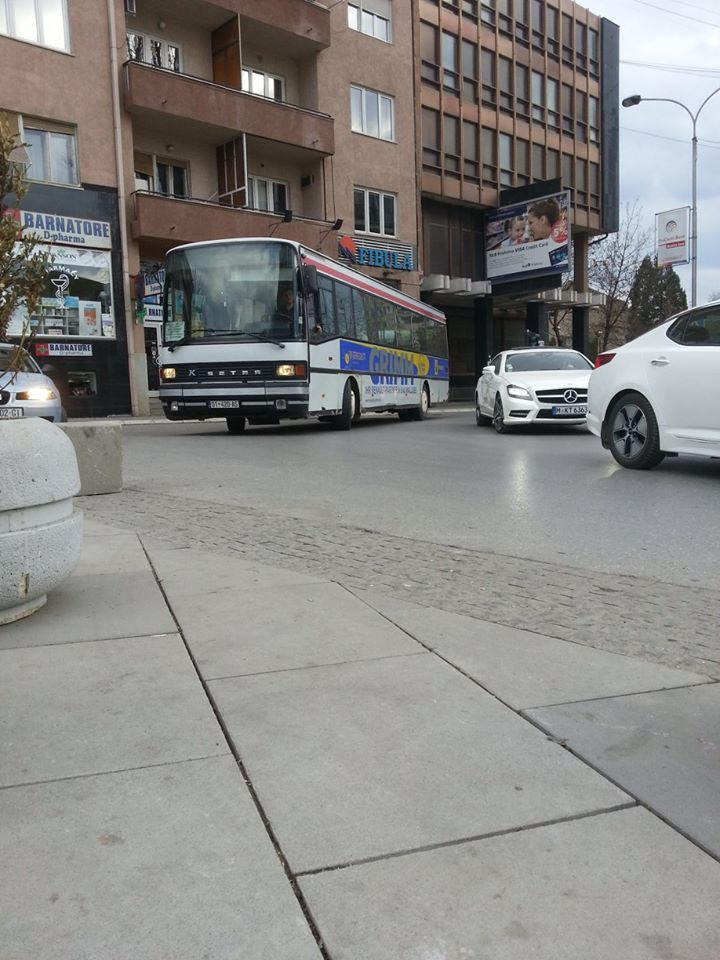
Buses in Pristina

Urban Traffic (Albanian: Trafiku Urban) only covers bus lines, of which are Lines 4 and 3A. Other lines are covered by private operators. To improve the services of public transport, the municipality of Pristina decided to invest around €2 million for Urban Traffic to buy new buses. Since 1907 there are plans for a steam tram line in Pristina, as found in the archives of Pristina. The first bus line in the city started in 1932. New plans for a tram line, and a light rail train are foreseen by the Urban Mobility Plan of the city (2018). A train-tram line that would link Pristina to the Airport is also part of the Kosovo Railways plans to develop.

=== Urban bus lines ===
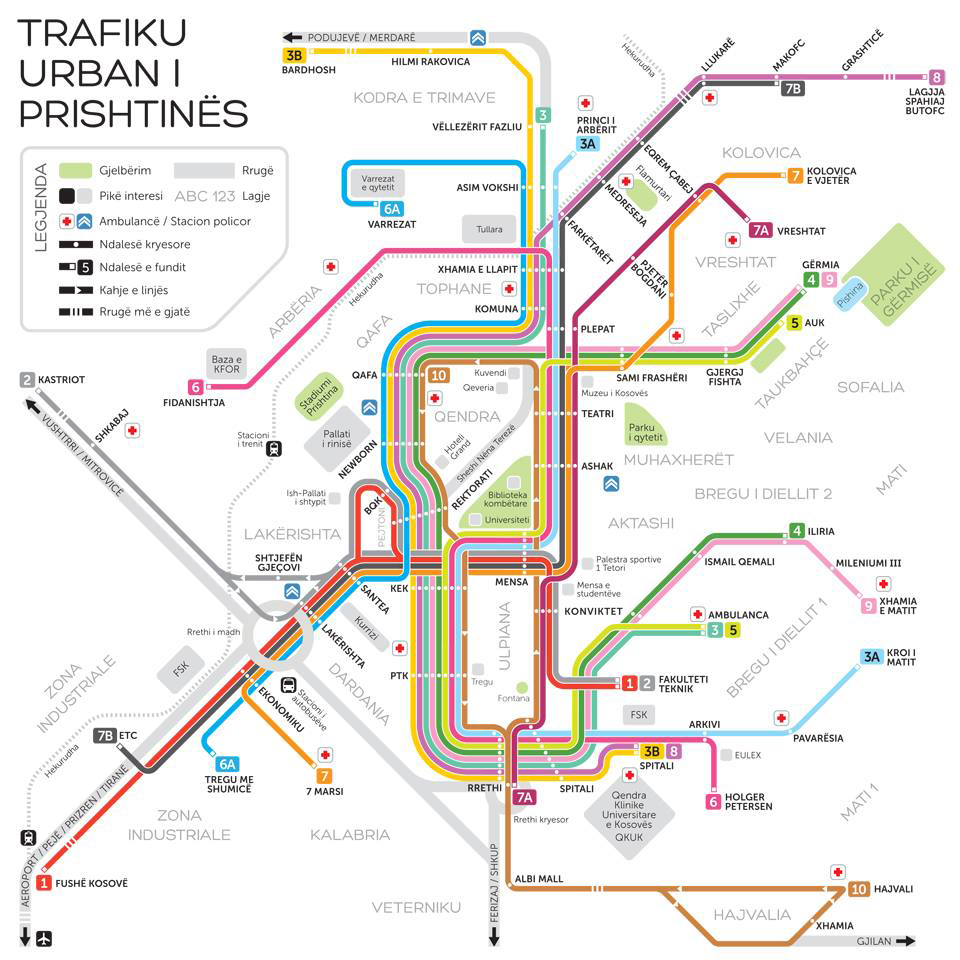
Urban Traffic Map

Bus line	Start	End
1/A	Technical Faculty/Bus Station	Fushë Kosovë/Airport
2	Technical Faculty	Kastriot
3	Bregu i Diellit	Bardhosh
3/A	Matiçan	Kodrën e Trimave
3/B	Hospital District	Bardhosh
4	Bregu i Diellit	Germia
5	Bregu i Diellit	Sofali
6	Arbëria	Street Malush Kosovo
6/A	Arbëria	VIVA Market (in front of ETC)
7	Kolovica	March 7 (Emshir)
7/A	Street Xhavit Ahmeti	Rrethi i Madh
8	Pristina Butofc	Center Hospital
9	Matiçan	Germia Park
10	Hajvalia	Around Pristina

== Taxis ==
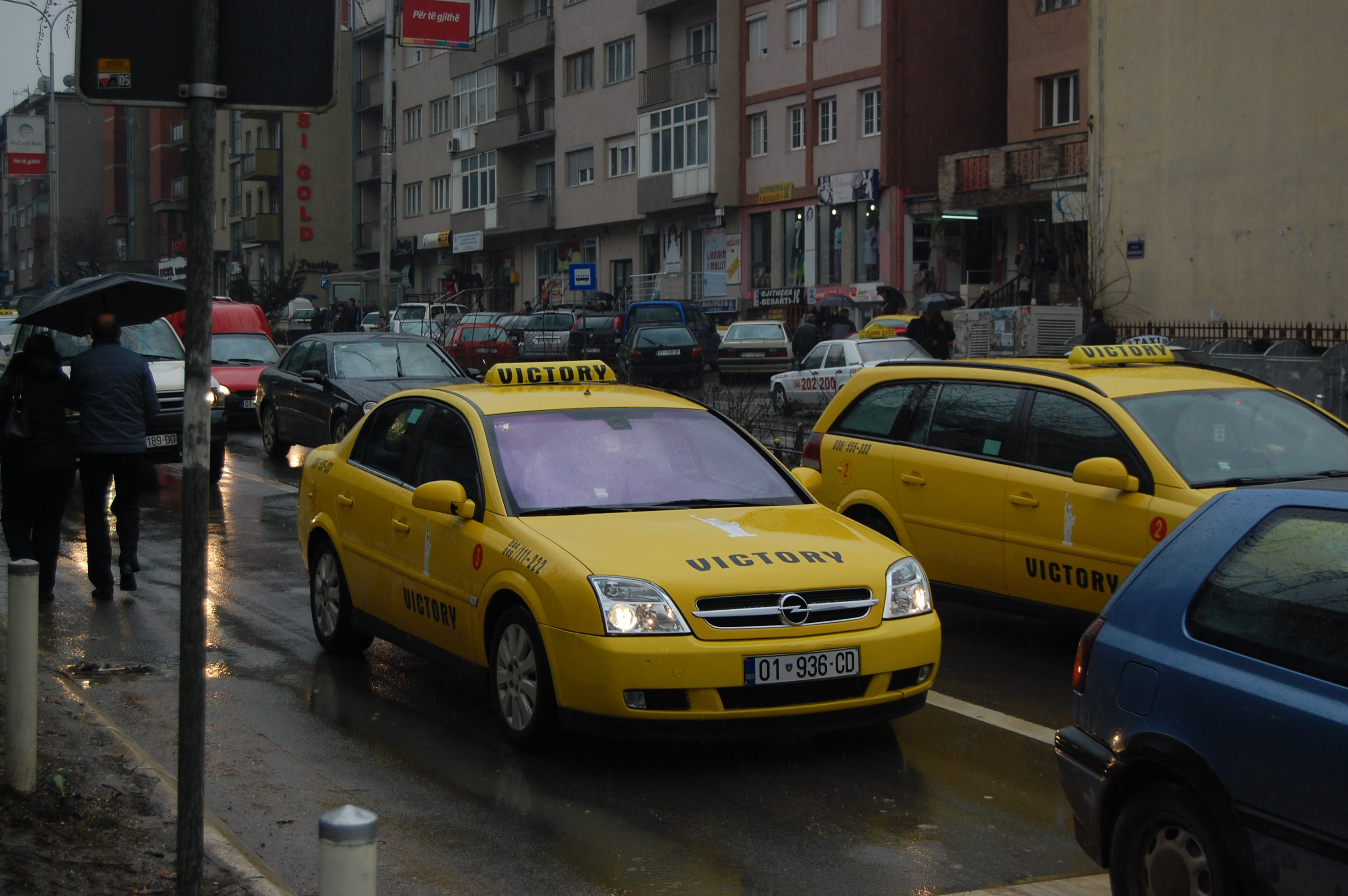
A taxi in Pristina

There are several taxi services in Pristina. There are some individual licensed taxi drivers with taxi meters but sometimes they offer of-the-meter prices.

== Cycling ==
Pristina has 15 cycle routes with a total length of 120 km. Pristina has been described as not being bike-friendly, being hilly, with curbside drains, potholes and busy traffic.

== Trains ==
The first railway line in Kosovo was constructed in 1874 starting from Hani i Elezit through Fushë Kosovë and ending in Mitrovica. Later Kosovo finished constructing an existing railway network throughout Kosovo territory. Kosovo Railways throughout Kosovo territory has a network of 333,451 km. Freight-only railway lines, which are not included in these statistics, span 103,4 km. Serbian Railways operates the line between Kraljevo and North Mitrovica, and Kosovo Railways operates the line connecting Kosovo with North Macedonia and through it with other countries worldwide.

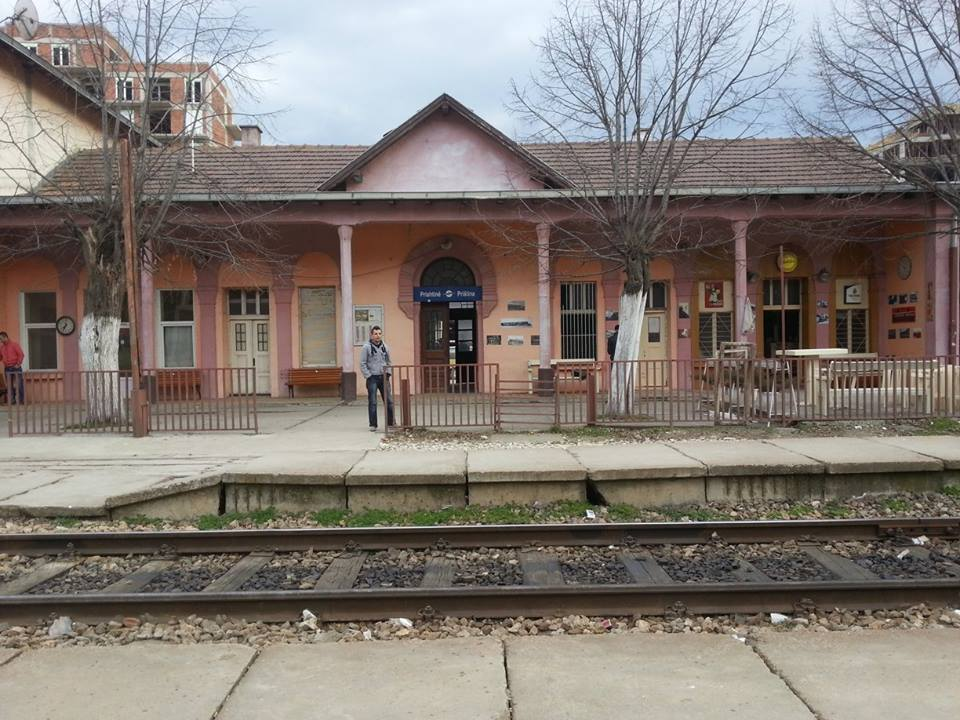
Pristina Train Station

Pristina effectively has two train stations: Pristina railway station lies west of the center near the end of Str. Garibaldi, while Fushë Kosovë railway station is Kosovo's main railway hub. Pristina is served by one daily train to Skopje. The train picks up passengers at 7:10 AM at Pristina station, located in the industrial section of Pristina, immediately down the hill from the Dragodan neighborhood on Tirana Blvd. A journey to Skopje takes just under 3 hours.

On 2 October 2007, Kosovo Railways inaugurated the new passenger line Pristina - Peja, served by two daily trains in each direction.

Tickets are relatively cheap, ranging between 0.30 euros and 3 euros for domestic travel. Kosovo Railways offer several kind of tickets: single, return, discounted (for students and pensioners), and monthly.

Kosovo Railways operate the following daily trains:

- Pristina – Peja – Pristina
- Pristina – Hani i Elezit – Pristina

== Cars ==
Kosovo had around 113 cars per 1000 residents in 2002. For comparison, Vienna has 393 cars per 1000 residents and Stuttgart 549 per 1000. Targeting better development and considering the geographic position of Pristina, the Kosovan government notes that increasing the number of motorcycles from 290 to 380 per 1000 residents by 2030 is not impossible.

== See also ==
- List of airlines of Kosovo
- List of airports by ICAO code: B
- Vehicle registration plates of Kosovo
