= Prishtina Mall =

Shopping center in Kosovo

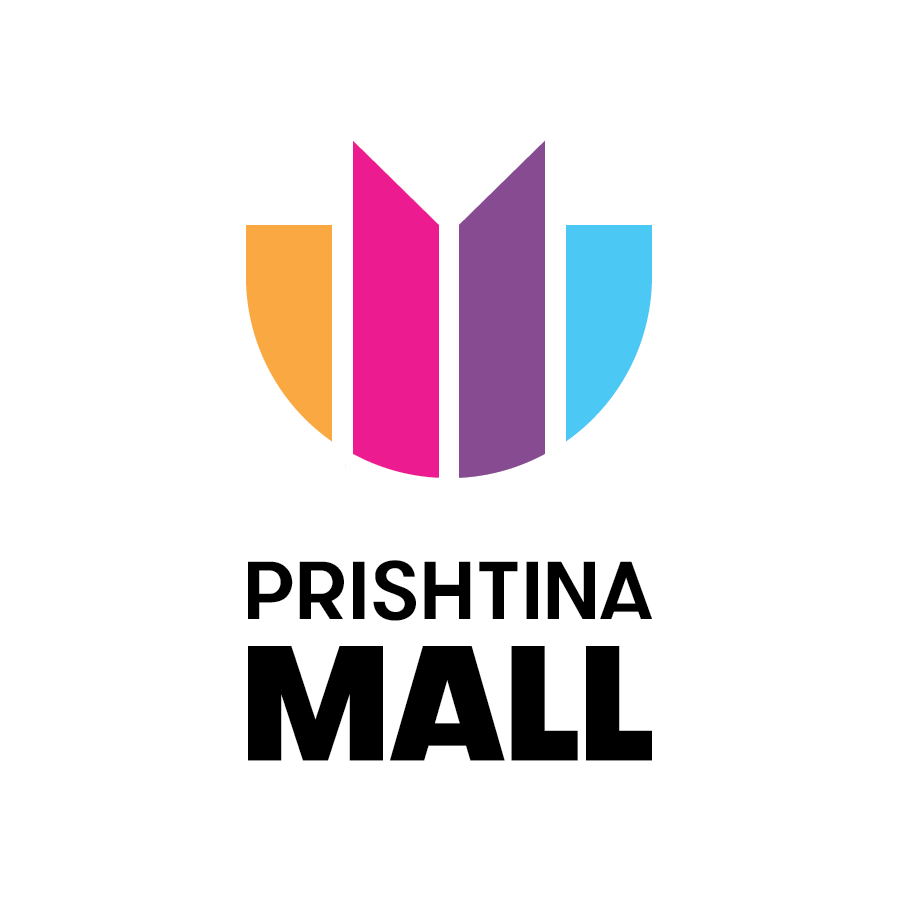

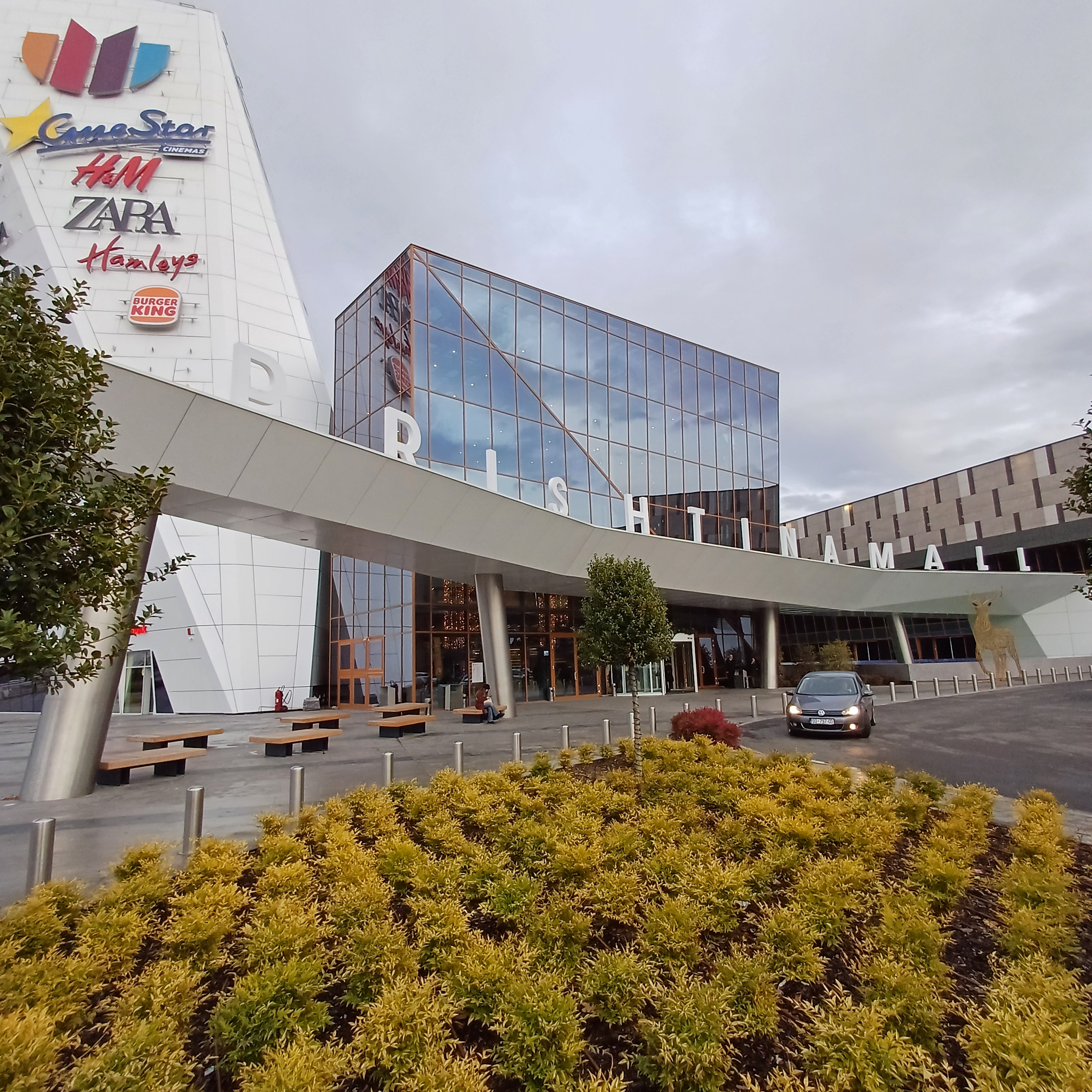
- Prishtina Mall, main (west) entrance
- Location: Pristina, Kosovo
- Coordinates: 42.5652°N 21.1365°E
- Address: M2 highway
- Opened: 9 March 2023; 3 years ago
- Owner: Prishtina Mall SH.A.
- Architect: Ed Jenkins
- Num. of stores: ~200
- Floor area: 114,562 square metres (1,233,140 sq ft) (shopping center)
- Floors: 3+1 underground parking
- Parking: ~5,000 spaces
- Public transit: Prishtina Mall Bus
- Website: Official website

Prishtina Mall is a shopping center in Pristina, Kosovo, located near the M2 Motorway in the direction of Ferizaj. Prishtina Mall was opened on 9 March 2023, as the biggest shopping center in Kosovo.
