= Bill Clinton Boulevard =

Boulevard located in Pristina, Kosovo

- Boulevard
- Bulevardi i Bill Clinton
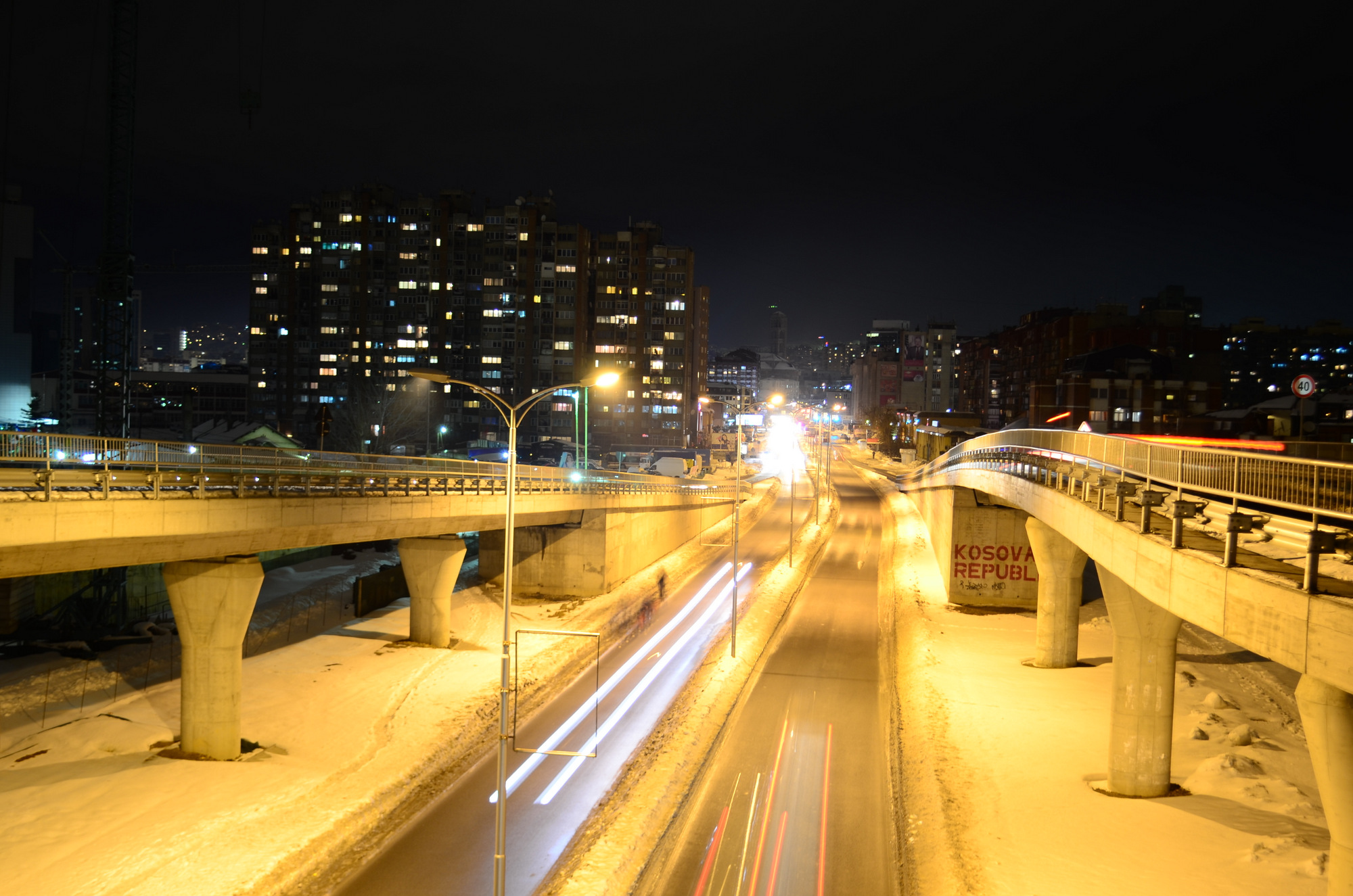
- Location: Pristina, Kosovo
- Interactive map of Bill Clinton Boulevard

Bill Clinton Boulevard is a boulevard located in Pristina, Kosovo. Following the Kosovo War of 1998 to 1999, Albanians in Kosovo wanted to thank former U.S. President Bill Clinton for his help in their struggle with the government of Yugoslavia. An 11-foot-high (3.4 m) statue of Clinton was unveiled on the boulevard on 1 November 2009, at a ceremony where the former U.S. president spoke.

Elsewhere in Pristina, another street has also been named after U.S. President George W. Bush. In addition, several cities in Kosovo, including Prizren, have streets named after President Woodrow Wilson.

== Gallery ==
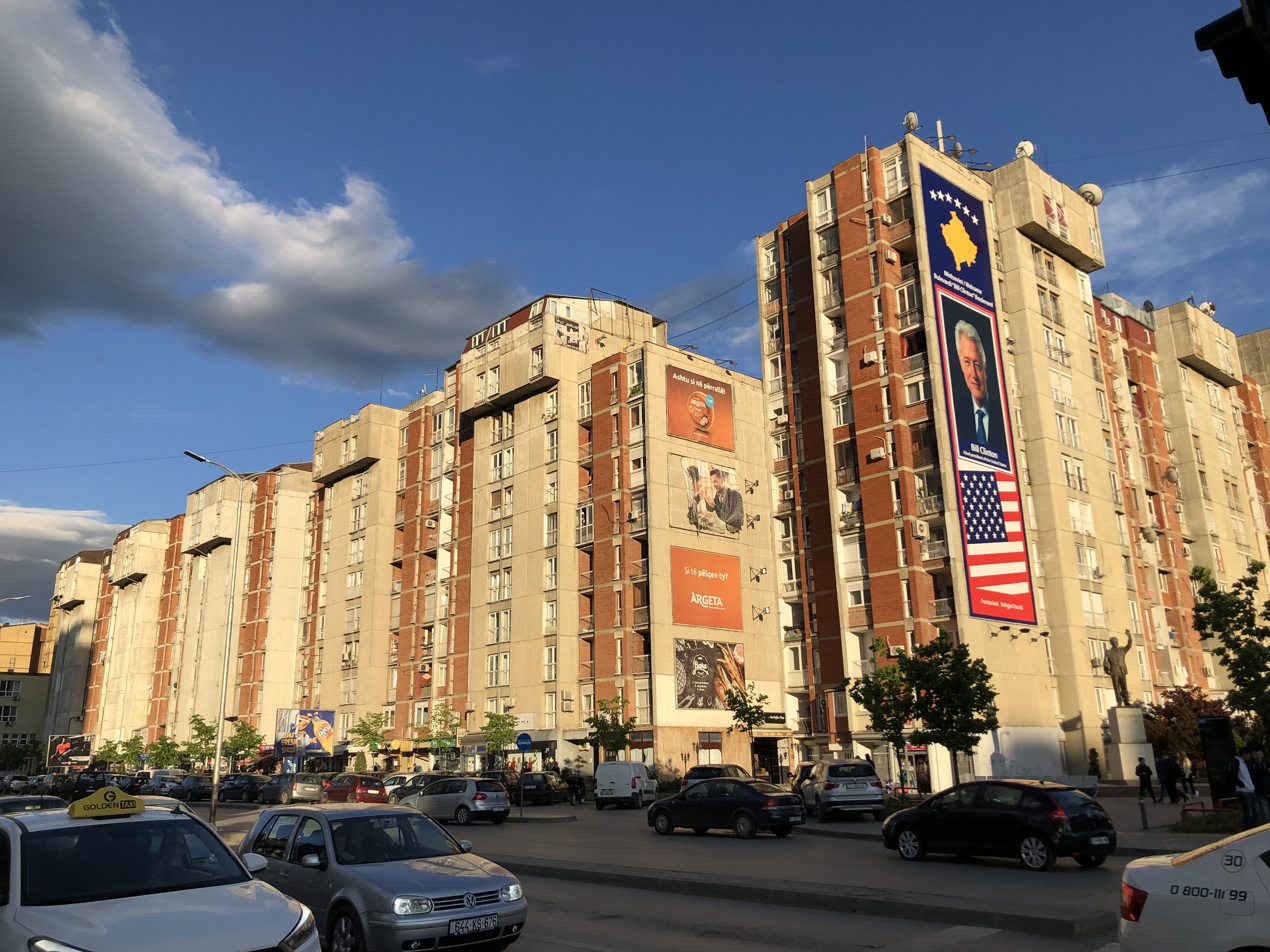

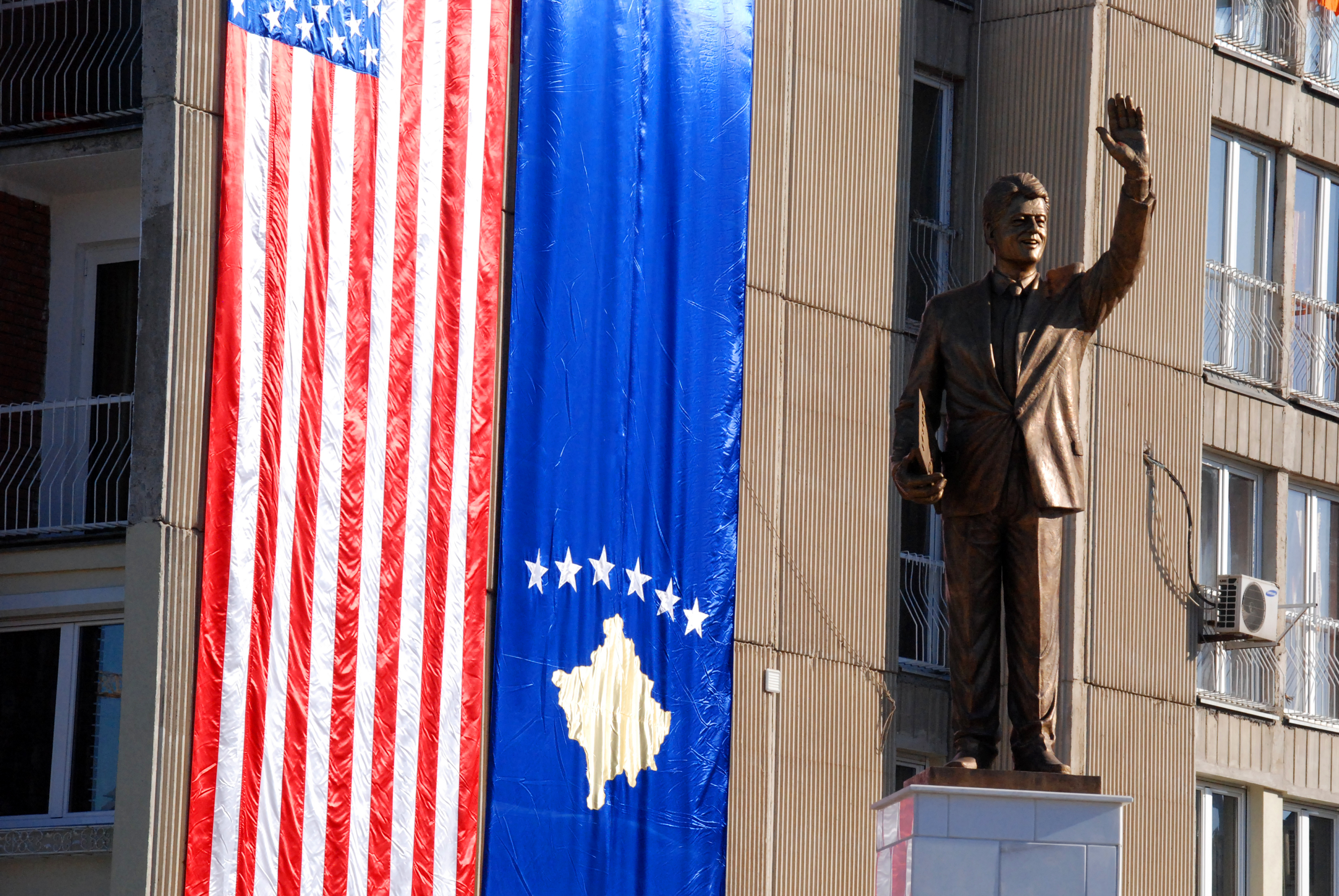

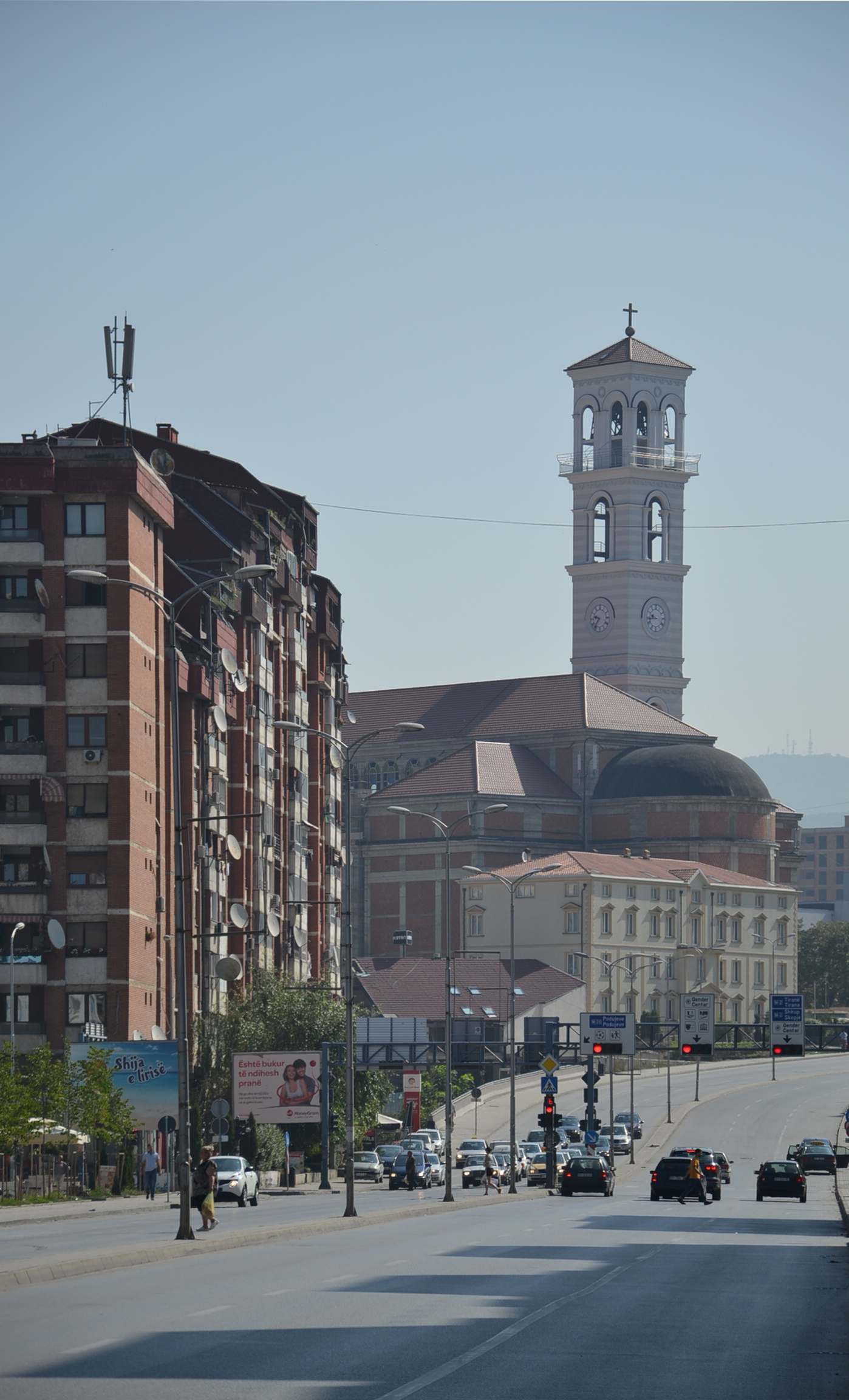

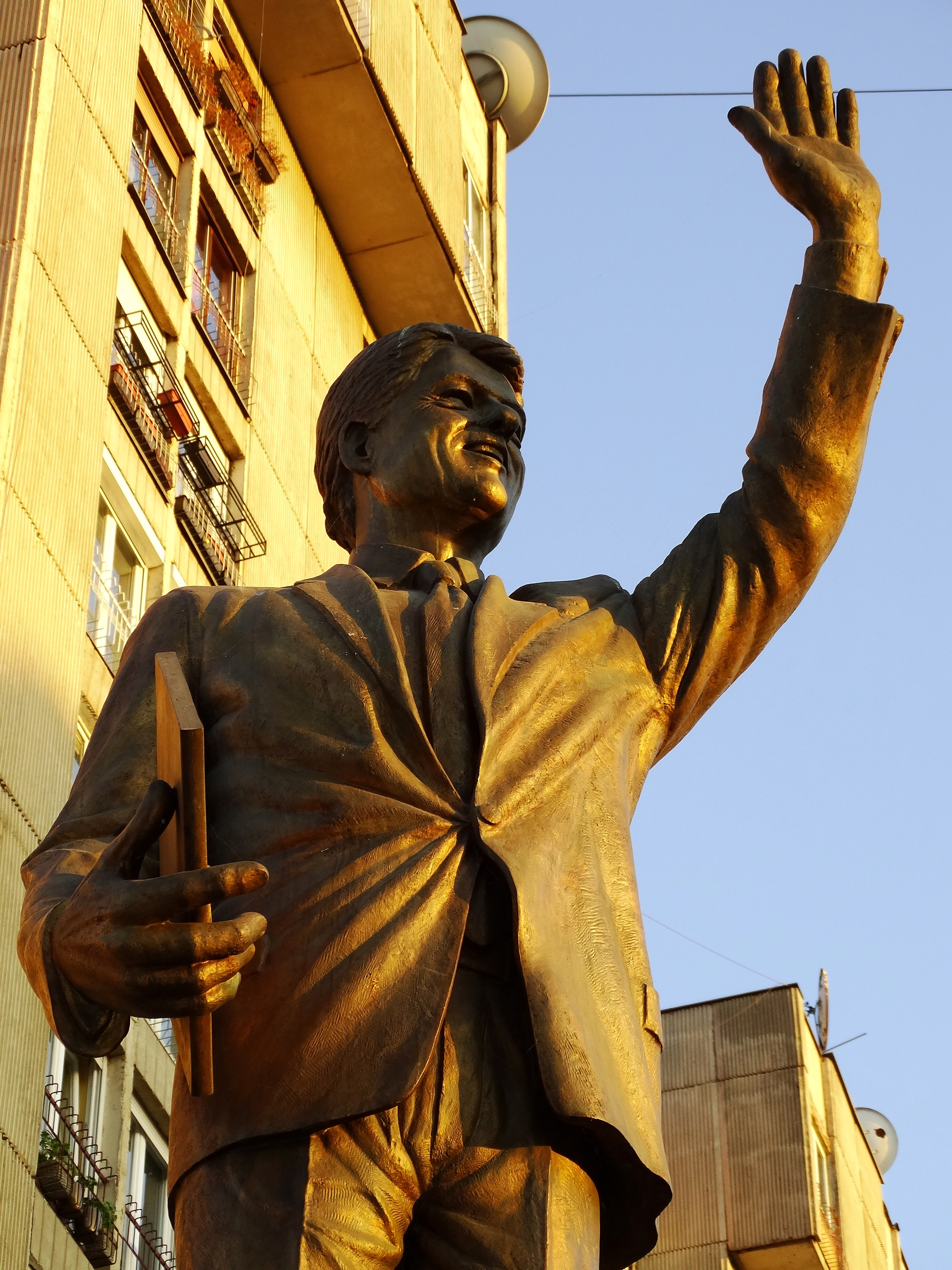

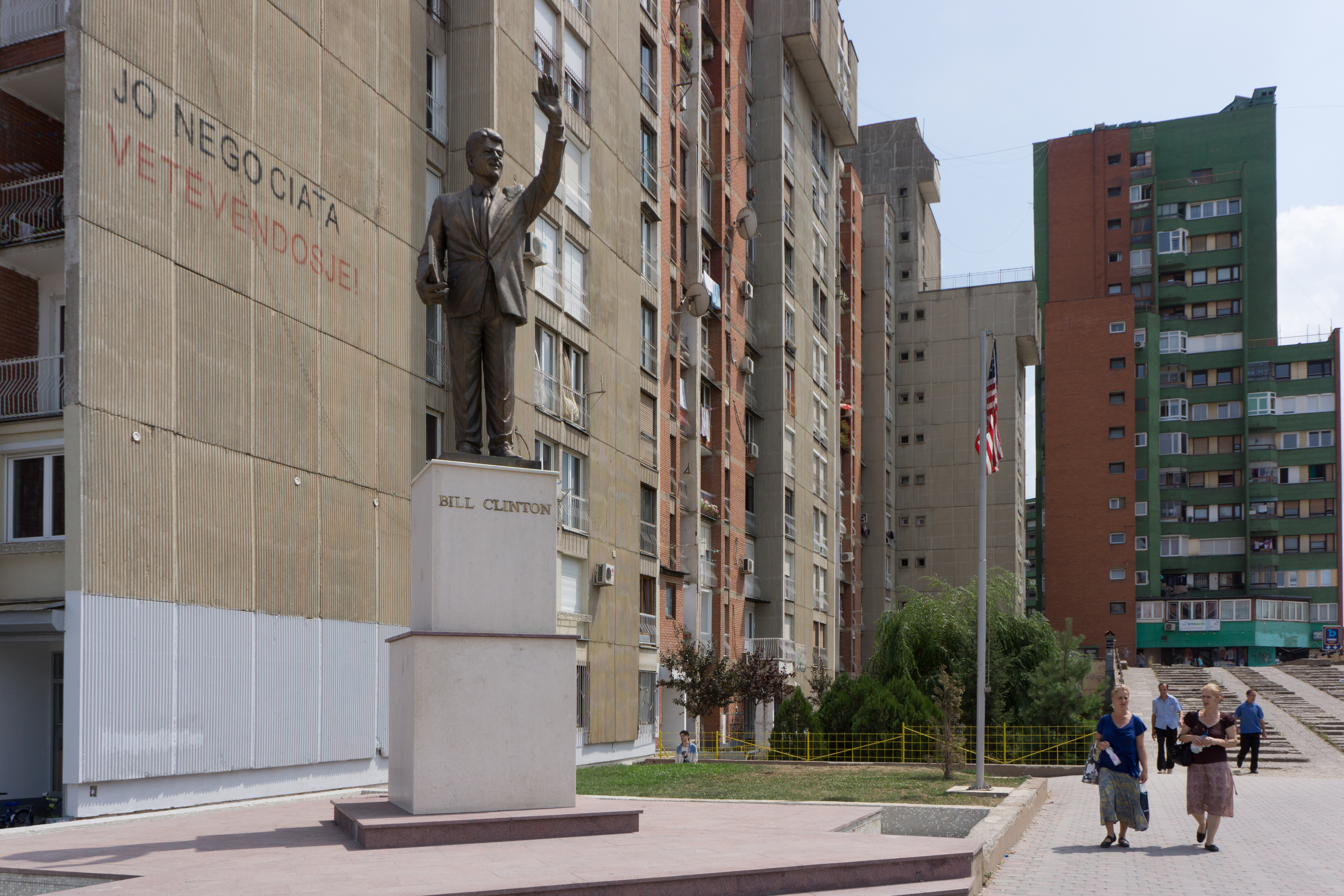

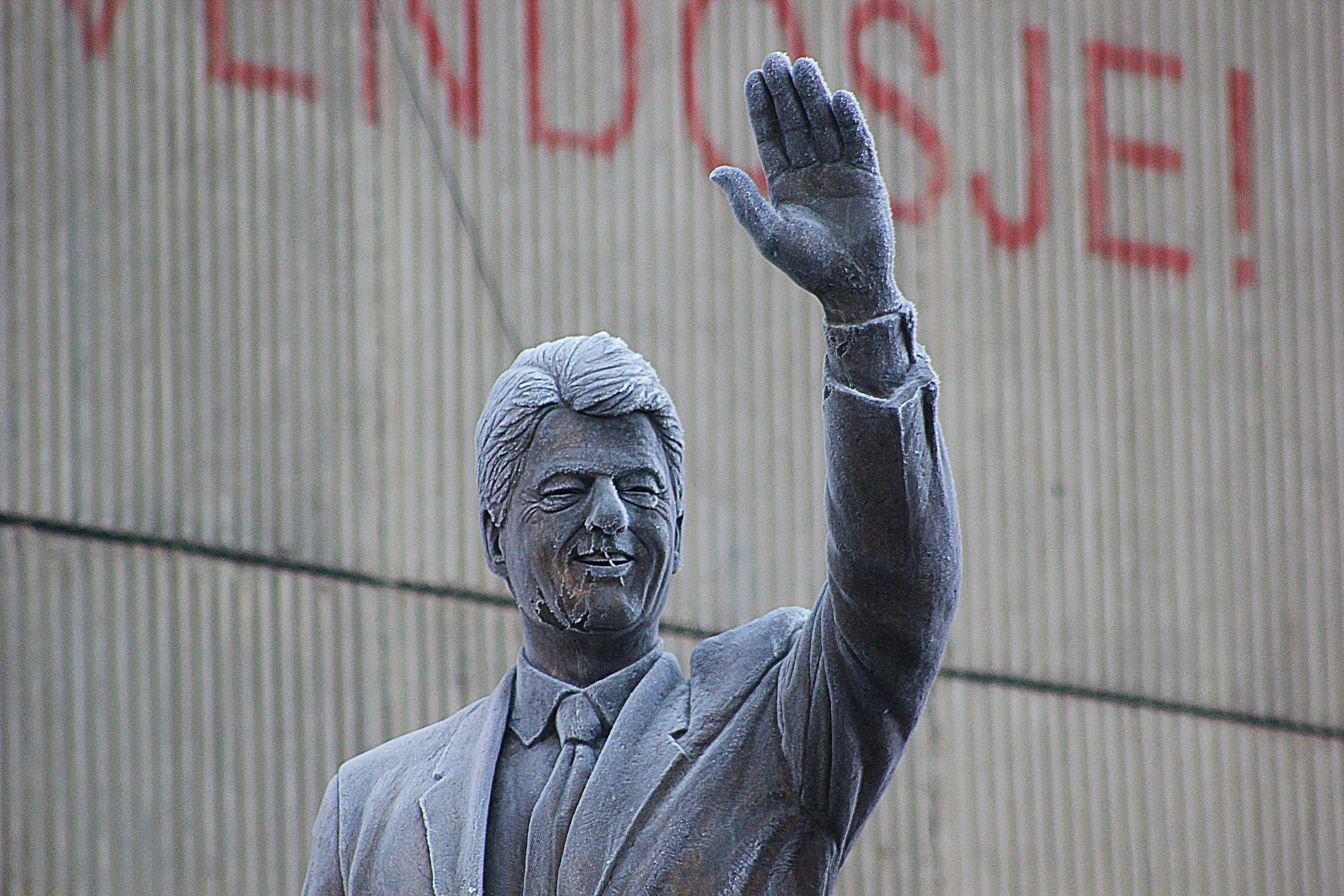

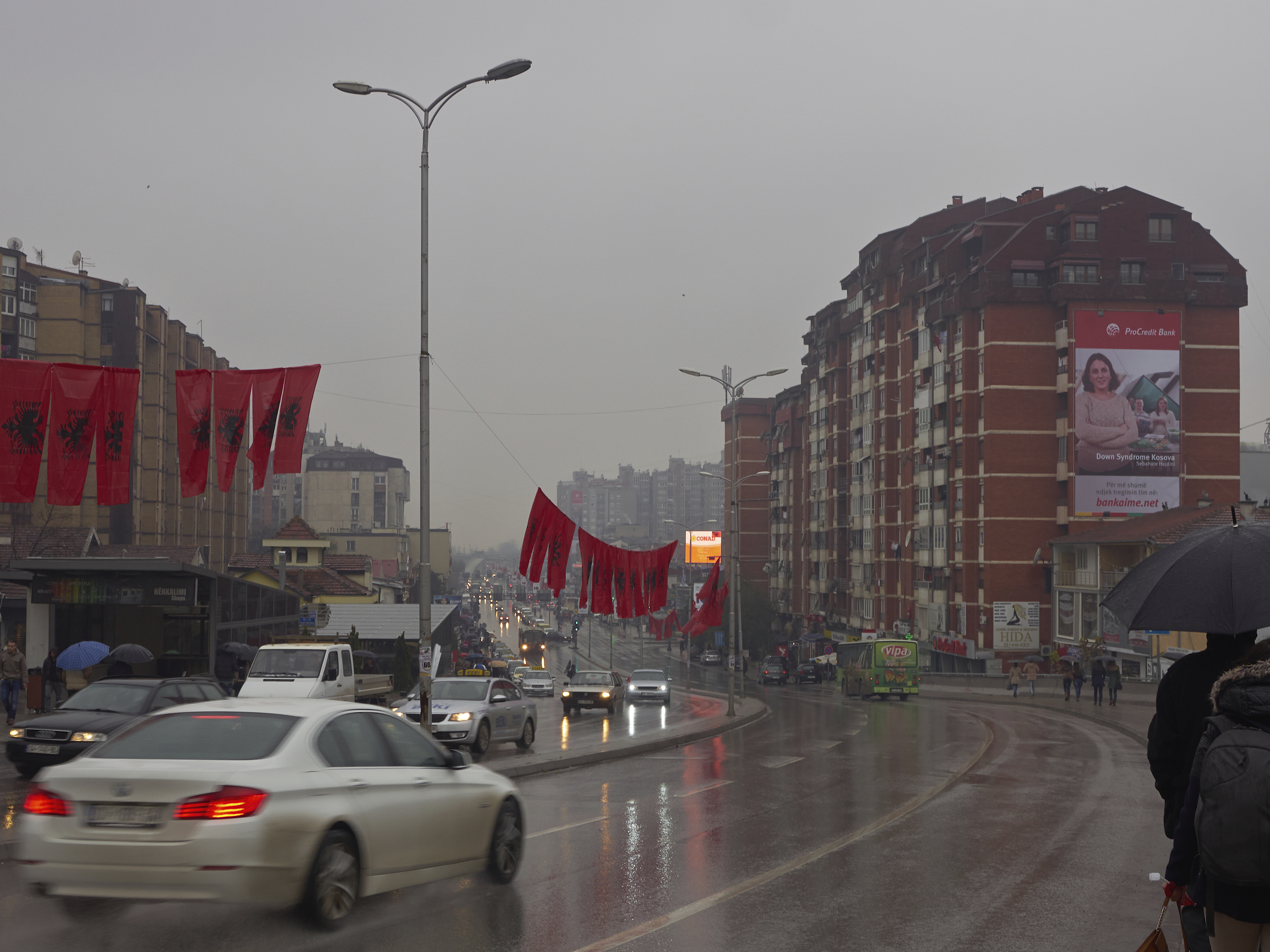

== See also ==
- Tourism in Kosovo
- History of Kosovo
- Bill Clinton
- Pristina
- Kosovo War
- Albanian Americans
- Albania-United States relations
- Kosovo-United States relations
