= Matiçan =

Matiçan: Matiçan (Albanian); Матичане/Matičane (Serbian)
- Village
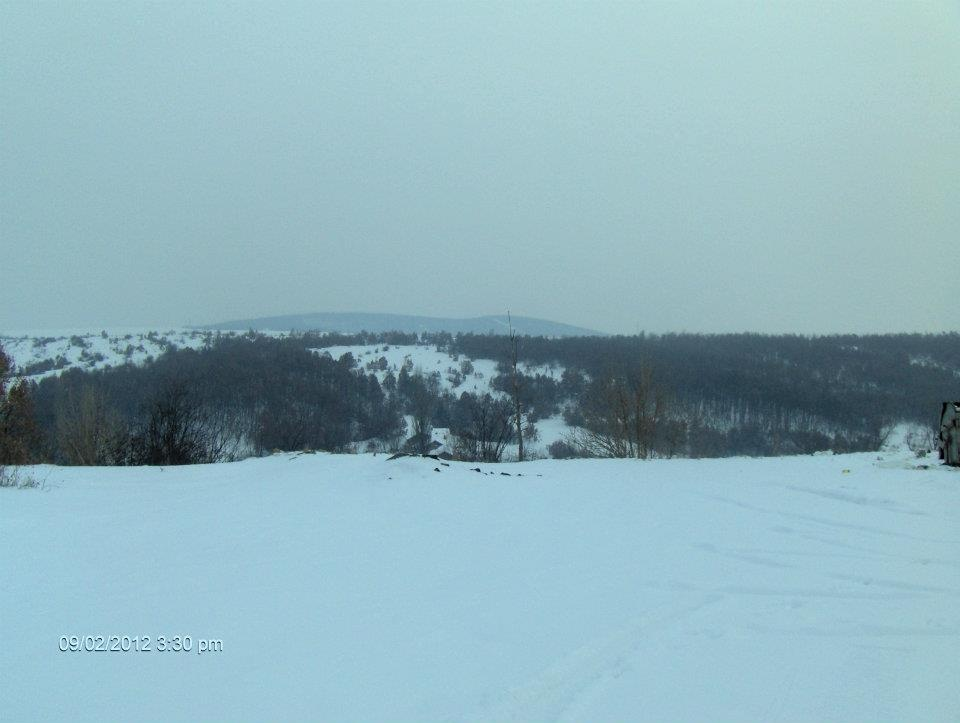

- Location within Kosovo
- Coordinates: 42.644892°N 21.191821°E
- Country: Kosovo
- District: Pristina
- Municipality: Pristina
- Elevation: 676 m (2,218 ft)

Population (2024)
  - Total: 38,360
- Time zone: UTC+1 (CET)
  - Summer (DST): UTC+2 (CEST)

Matiçan (Albanian: Matiçan, Serbian Cyrillic: Матичане/Matičane) is a village in Pristina municipality.
