= Harilaq Fortress =

Hilltop fortress in Kosovo

- Albanian: Kalaja e Harilaqit
- Harilaq in Kosovo
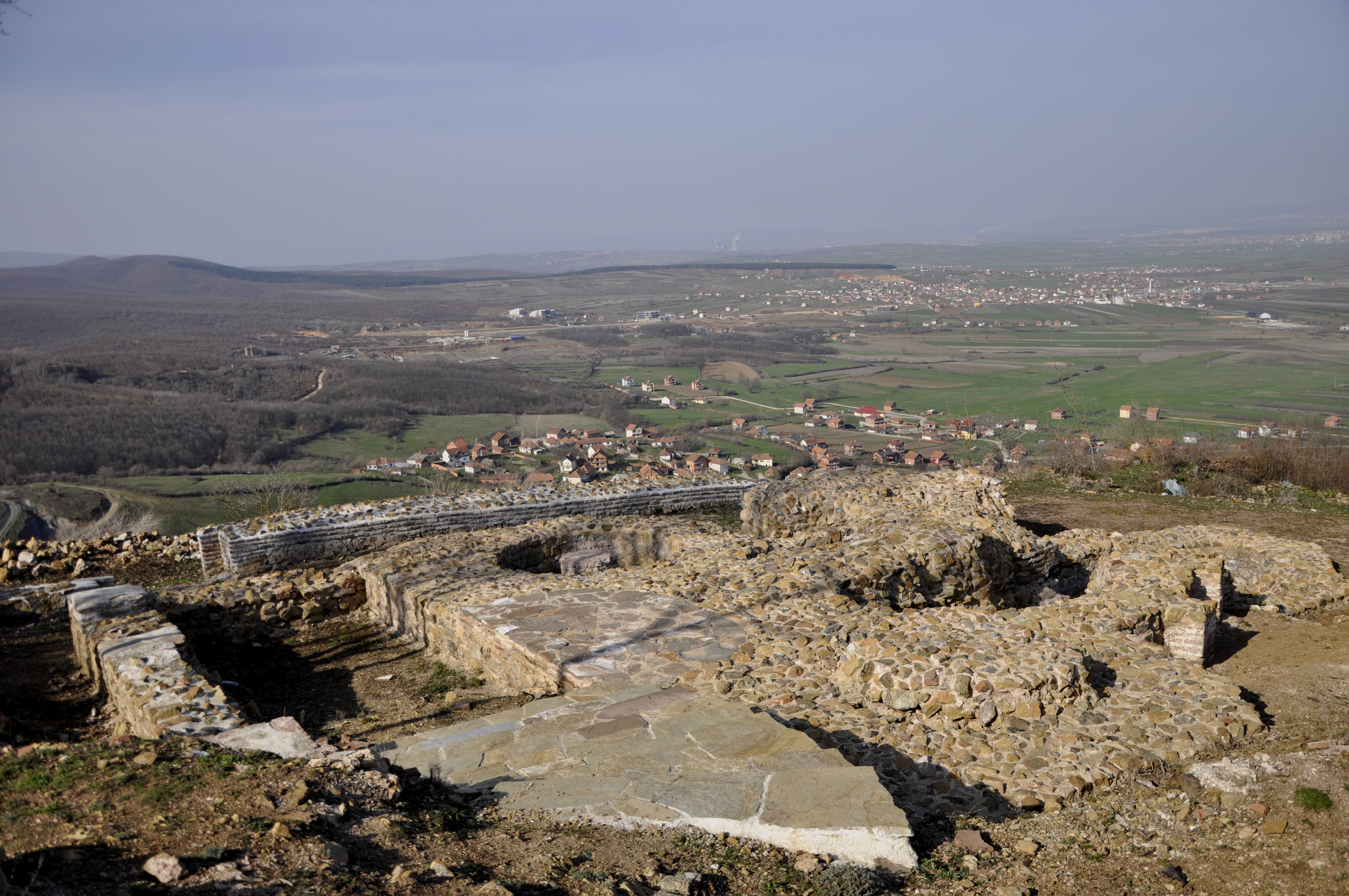

Site information
- Owner: Kosovo

Location
- Location within Kosovo
- Coordinates: 42.578367°N 20.997699°E

Site history
- Built: Prehistoric times

The Harilaq Fortress (Albanian: Kalaja e Harilaqit; Serbian: Градина) is a hilltop fortification west of the village of Harilaq in Kosovo. The fortress is of great archaeological importance, with its roots tracing back to prehistoric times and its peak development occurring during late Antiquity through the early Byzantine period.

== Location ==
The fortress is situated in the village of Harilaq, about 9 km southwest of Fushe Kosova and 16 km southwest of Pristina. It sits on a 1.3-hectare forested hill, with an elevation ranging from 736 m to 767 m, while the Golesh Hill (1019 m) is to the west. It has a strategic position overlooking the Kosovo field, with portions of the municipalities of Kosovo Polje, Pristina, Obiliq, Lipjan, Ferizaj, Shtime and Drenas visible. Before excavations, the ramparts and interior were hidden by soil and vegetation.

== Overview ==
The Harilaq Fortress differs from other fortifications of this period, not only within Kosovo but throughout the Central Balkans. This stronghold enters in the group of fortresses and fortifications reconstructed and constructed in Dardania (61 reconstructed and 8 constructed) by Byzantine emperor Justinian the Great (527–565 AD), recorded in the written work by Procopius in the 6th century, in his book De Aedificiis – On Buildings.

Archaeological excavations at the site began in 2005 and continued systematically until 2009, with efforts made to preserve the circuit walls. Over the course of five seasons, the archaeological team uncovered a variety of structures, including a church with three naves, rampart towers, and two rounded sacral buildings of unknown purpose.

A significant amount of movable artifacts was found, including metal tools, jewelry, coins, bricks, and glass fragments, all pointing to the Late Antiquity period, particularly the Justinian era. The site also showed evidence of continuous use from prehistoric times through the Medieval Period. Discovered and recorded findings from this site of excavations from 2005 to 2008 were presented at the International Conference on Illyria: Illyri Meridionale et l'Epire dans l'antiquite, Act du V colloque internacional de Grenoble, 8–11 octobre 2008, held in Grenoble, France.

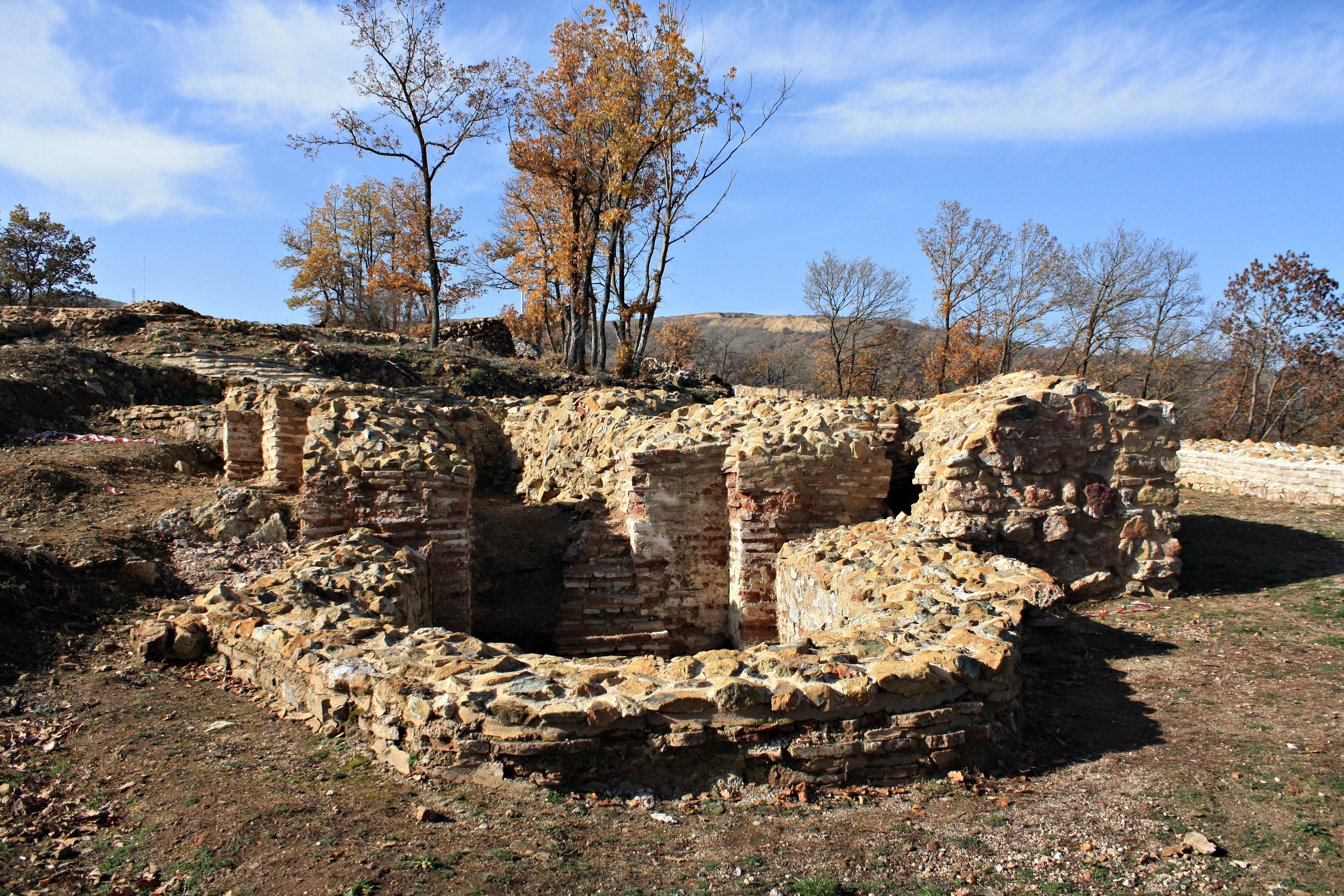
Harilaq Fortress holds significant archaeological value due to its origins in prehistoric times

Harilaq Fortress presents the most excavated area, compared to fortresses of the same period in Kosovo.

== See also ==
- Archaeology of Kosovo
- List of fortifications in Kosovo
- List of settlements in Illyria
