= Cultural heritage of Kosovo =

Overview of the cultural heritage

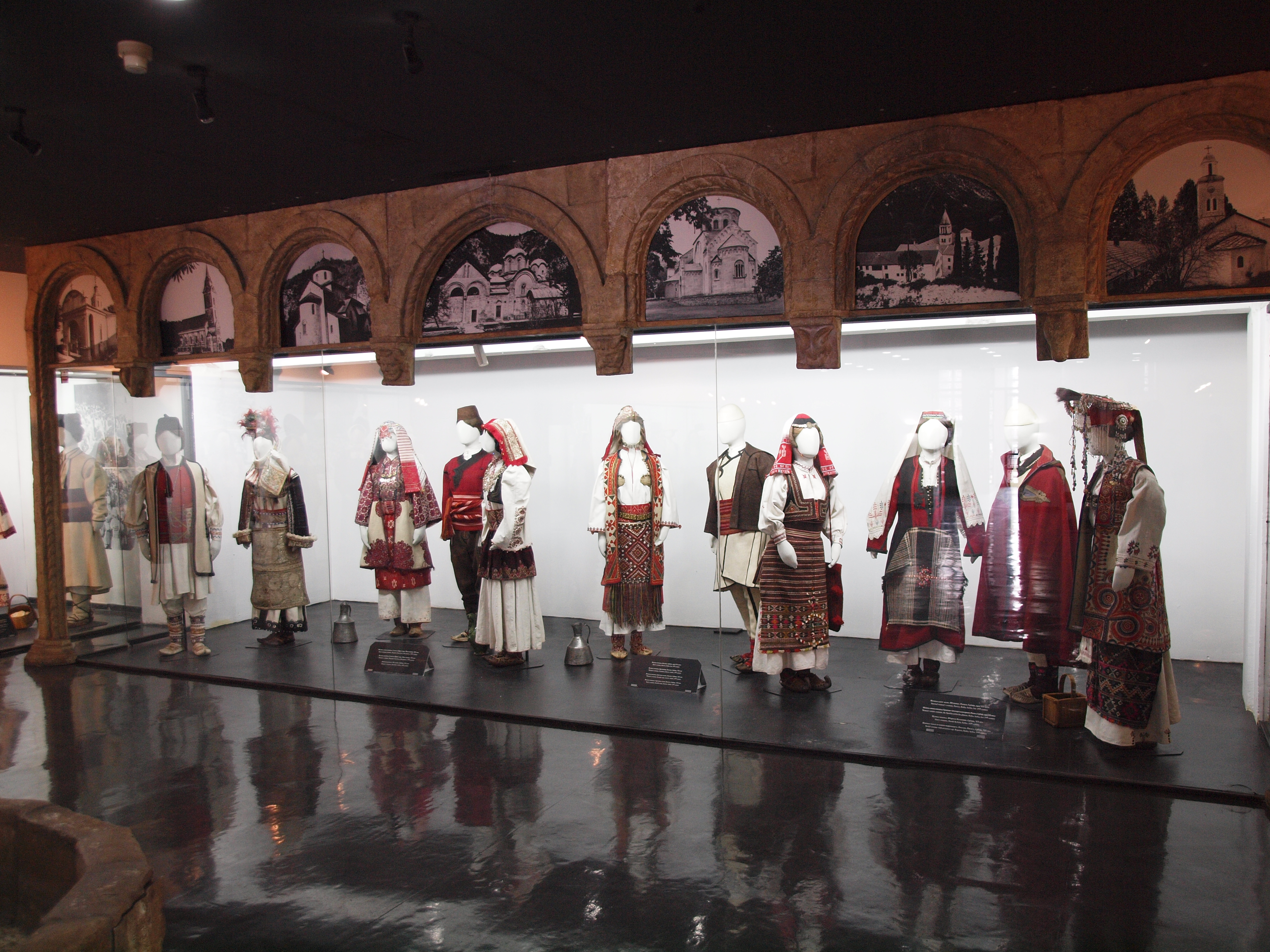
Albanian and Serbian traditional clothing from Kosovo, Ethnographic museum in Belgrade

Kosovo is a partially recognized state and disputed territory located in the Balkan Peninsula in Southeastern Europe. The majority of Kosovars are ethnically Albanian. Kosovo has an expansive cultural heritage, including monuments, clothing items, museums, and traditional food.

== Monuments ==
Many monuments of Kosovo date from the Neolithic period. Throughout history many monuments were changed, destroyed and new elements were added to them. There are different types of monuments that date from the Illyrian period continuing with the Roman Empire, Byzantine Empire, Late Antiquity and Middle Ages, Ottoman Empire period, etc. Most of the historical monuments are stationed in the district of the cities of Pristina, Prizren and Peja. Monuments in Kosovo mostly consist of ancient cities, castles (Kulla), monasteries, mosques and churches.

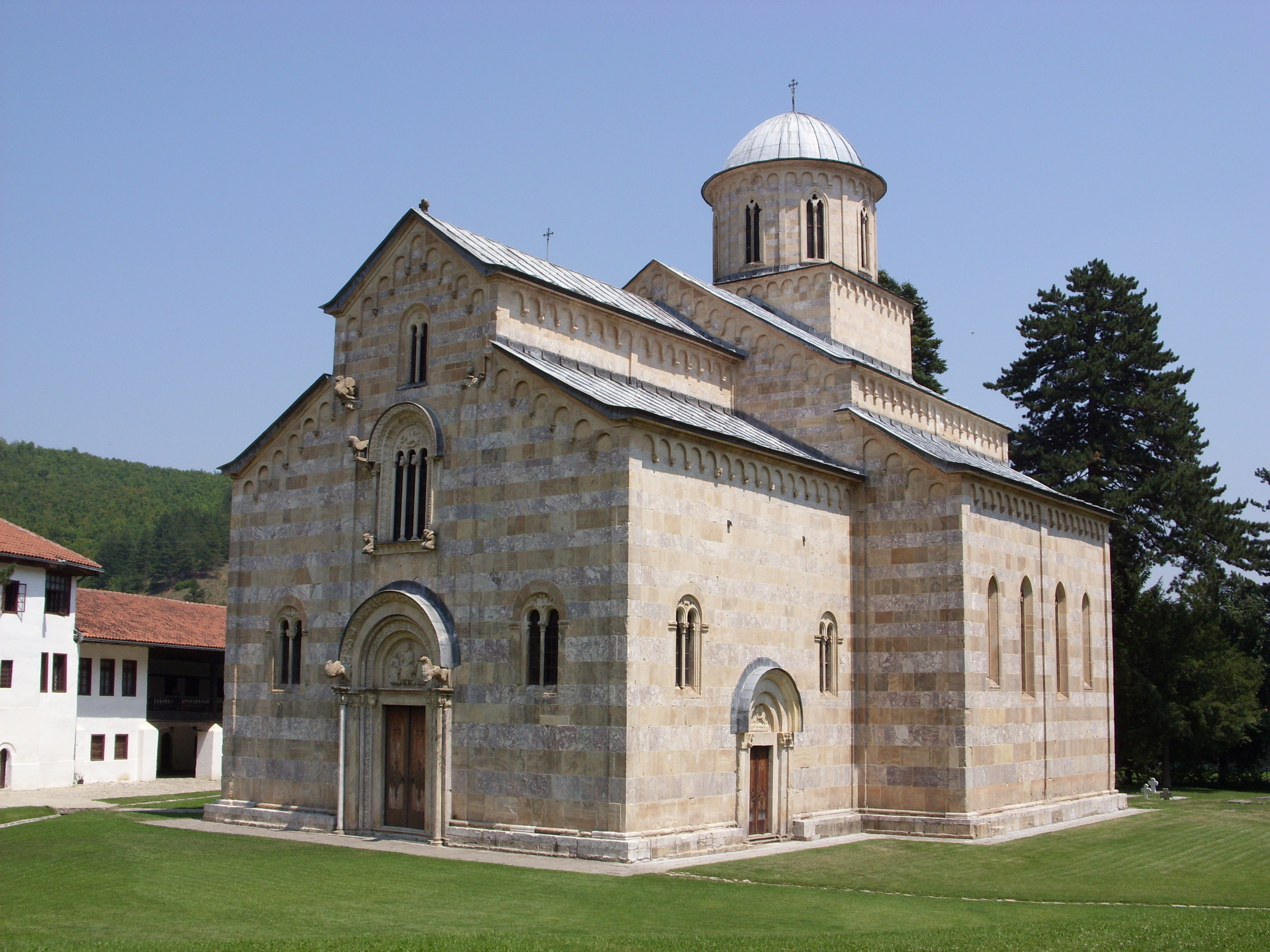
Visoki Dečani Monastery (1327) in Dečani

Some of the most famous monuments in Kosovo are:

- The ancient city of Ulpiana (I – VII) was an ancient Roman city. Site for archaeological excavations in which several objects were found. These objects include a woman's head, a man's head, head of eros and a tragic mask.
- Visoki Dečani Monastery (1327–1335) A major Serbian Orthodox Christian monastery. It is the largest medieval church containing the most extensive fresco decoration.
- Patriarchate of Peć (1235) A Serbian Orthodox monastery. The complex of churches is the spiritual seat and mausoleum of Serbian archbishops and patriarchs.
- Sultan Mehmet Fatih Mosque in Pristina (1461)Located right in the heart of the old town center. It is Pristina's largest and most prominent mosque. Its cupola was once the biggest in the region. The square in front of Mbretit Mosque has always been a popular meeting point.
- The house of League of Prizren (1878)): One of Kosovo's most important historical site. It is a museum complex of four buildings.

Castles are also very common in Kosovo. The castle of Prizren, the city and castle of Artanë which was a huge trade city in the 13th century and earlier, the castle of Kekola an ancient Dardan castle which dates from the Bronze era (1300-1100 b.c), etc.

Because of the many wars that Kosovo went through in different years and times, many monuments were destroyed.

== Museums ==
=== Kosovo museum ===
Today Kosovo has seven active museums all over its territory. The museums are the:

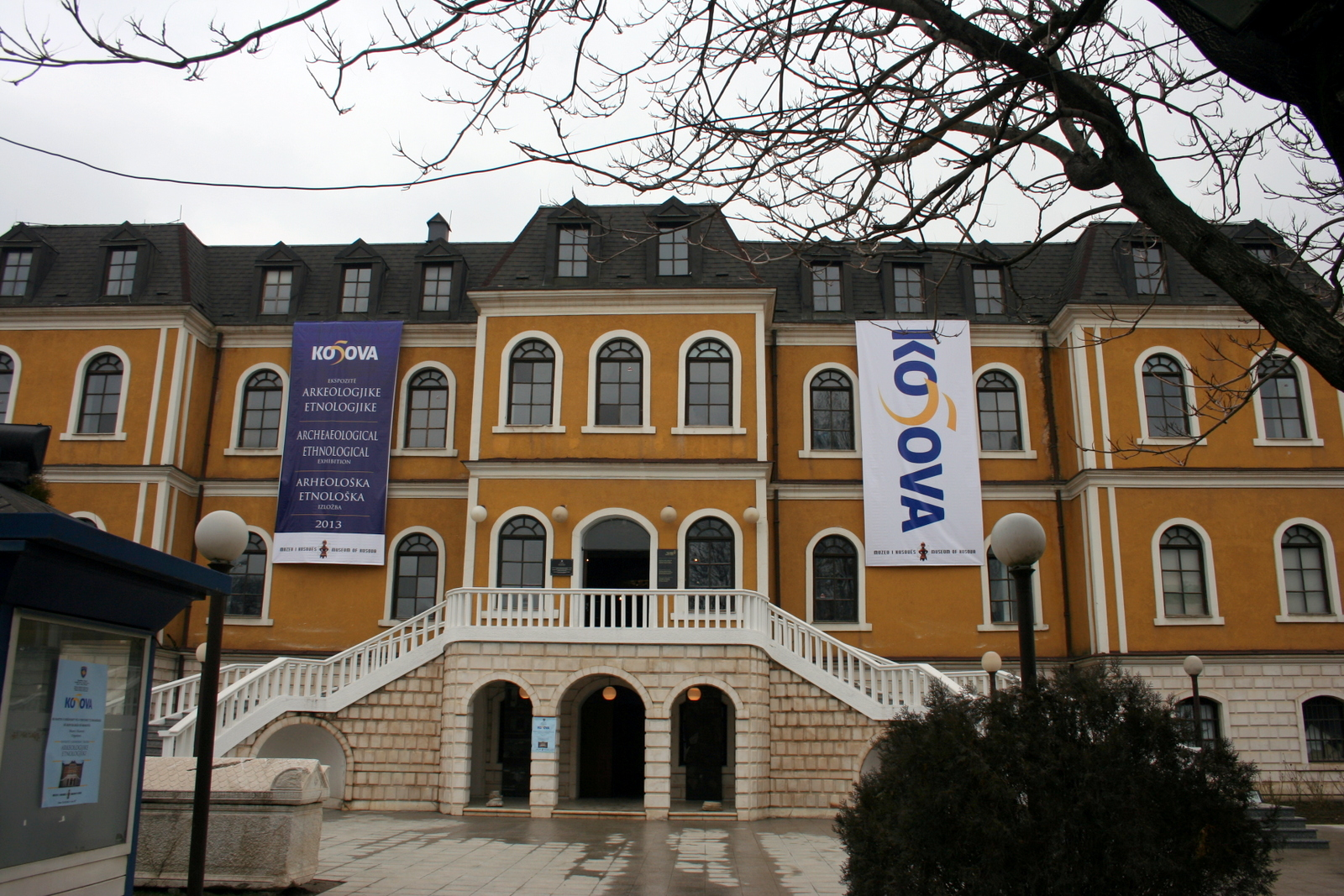
National Museum of Kosovo.

- National Museum of Kosovo: Housed in an Austro-Hungarian style house, containing more than 50,000 items exhibited through various pavilions. Also housed here are exhibits expressing the day in the life for the people in various regions.
- Railway museum of Kosovo : A one-room exhibit dedicated to the railways
- Ethnological museum "Emin Gjiku" in Prishtinë: Monument of culture since the 18th century. At this museum one can find displays of ancient clothing, tools, containers, furniture and old weapons.
- Albanian league of Prizren:One of Kosovos most important historical sites. It's a complex of four buildings that had been completely reconstructed. Represents where patriots and intellectuals joined to start the political, military and cultural struggle to against the Ottoman Empire in order to appeal for an autonomous Albanian state.
- Archeological museum in Prizren: Once functioned as a Turkish bathhouse. Now fully renovated and filled with over 800 items of archeological interest from antiquity to the 19th century. Building also acts as a clock tower built at the end of the 19th century.
- Museum in Mitrovica

=== National museum of Kosovo ===
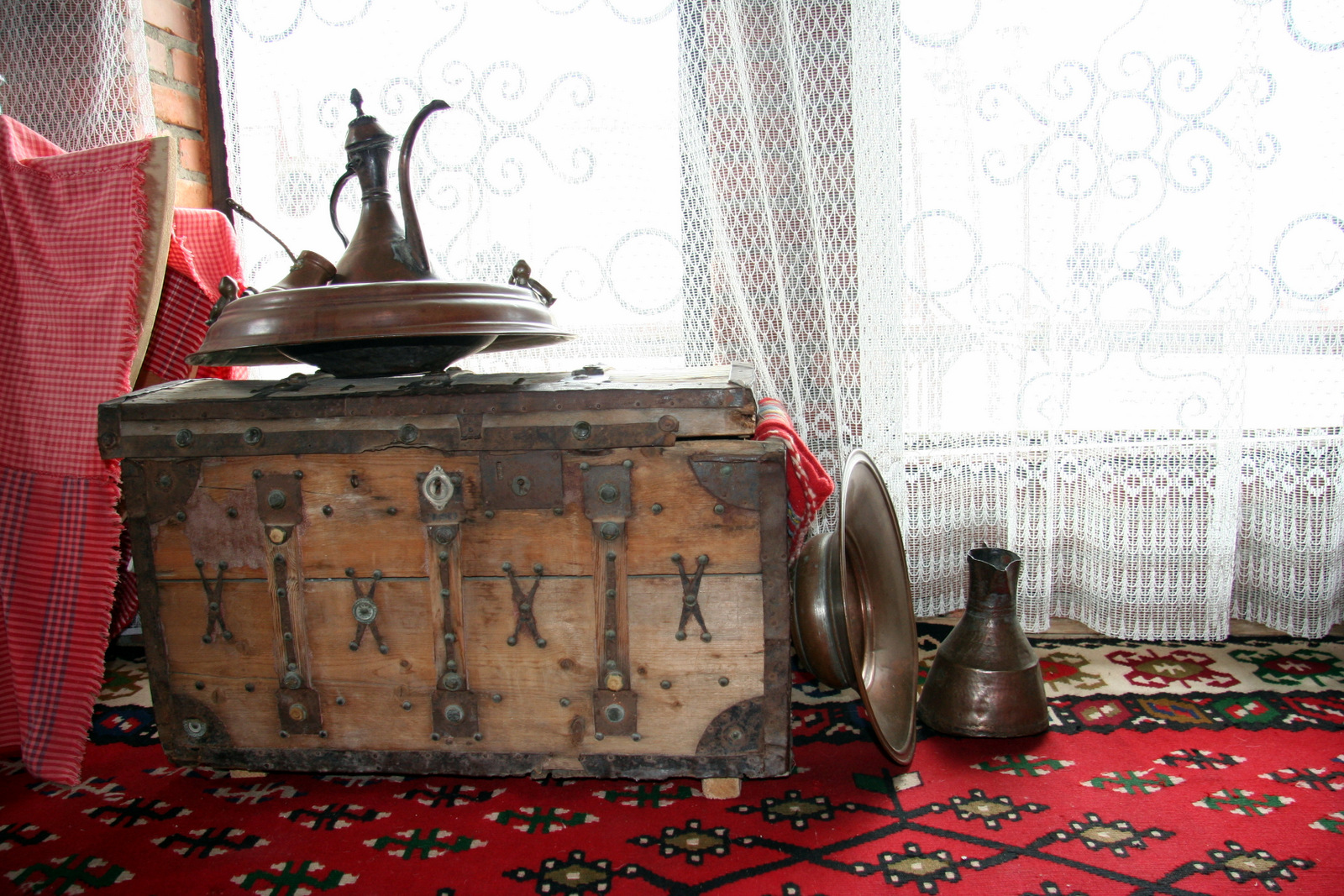
Ethnological items.

Housed in an Austro Hungarian style house, contained more than 50,000 items exhibited through various pavilions. Also housed here are exhibits expressing the day in the life for the people in various regions. The museum objectives are to save, protect and present the Cultural Heritage of Kosovo.

=== Traditional clothes in Kosovo ===
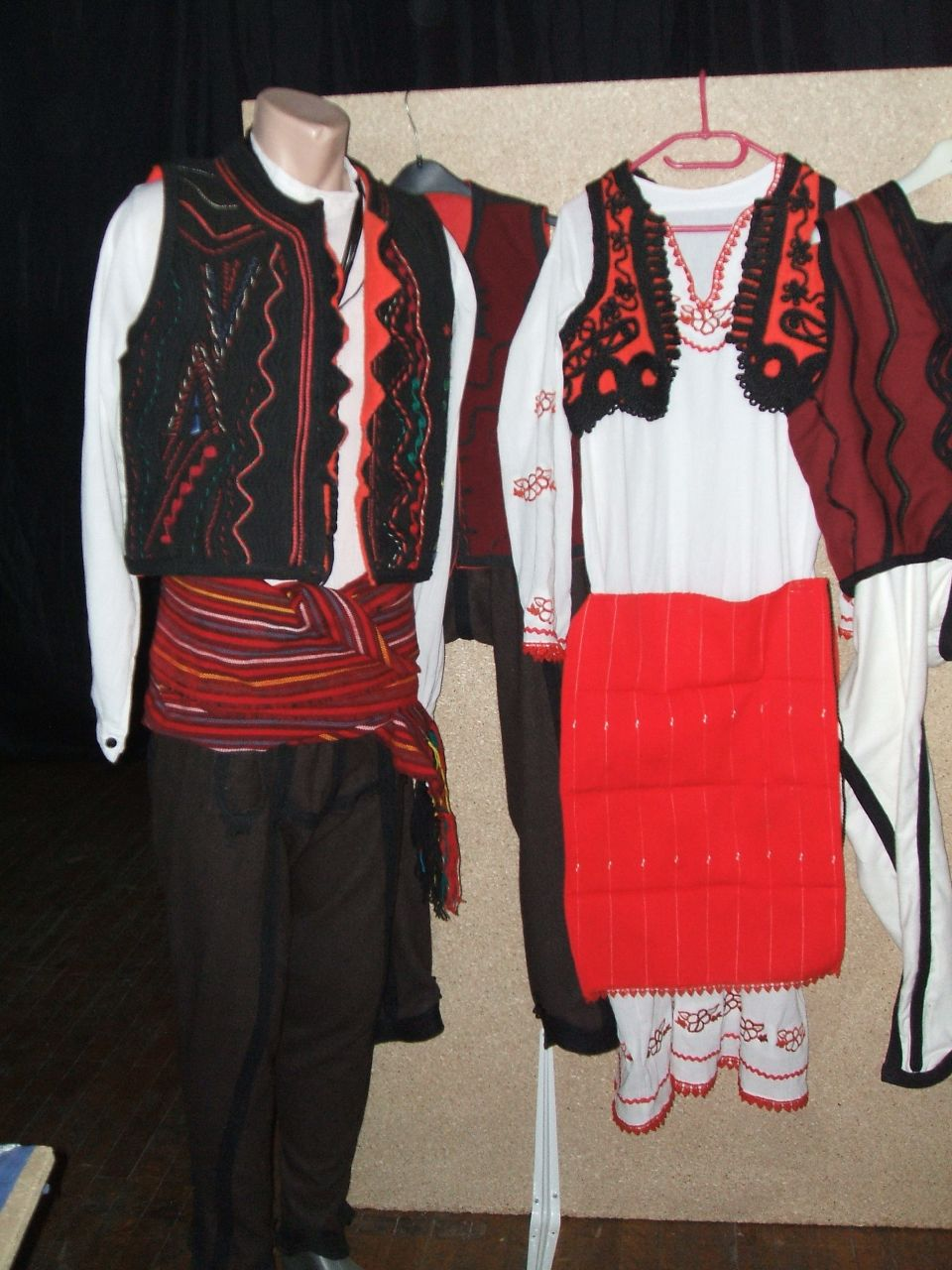
Traditional Albanian clothing

Traditional clothes in Kosovo take a special place in Cultural heritage of Kosovo. They were homemade clothes or made by craftsman specialized in that field. Traditional clothing in Kosovo resembles much of the Albanian traditional clothing if not all the same. First is the headgear, a woolen cone-shaped plis for the male, and a pashnik headdress for the female of a common red color. The plis is white and in some regions men cover it round with a pashnik and in region of Rugova men cover it round with a white cotton scarf.

In the past they used decorated guns, decorated pocket clocks, decorated cigarettes boxes etc. . Today plis and tirq are being worn combined with European modern clothes to symbolize national identity. What specifies the region of Metohija is the white scarf which they cover they head with, the region of Drenica is specified with woman with a lot of jewelries and so on.

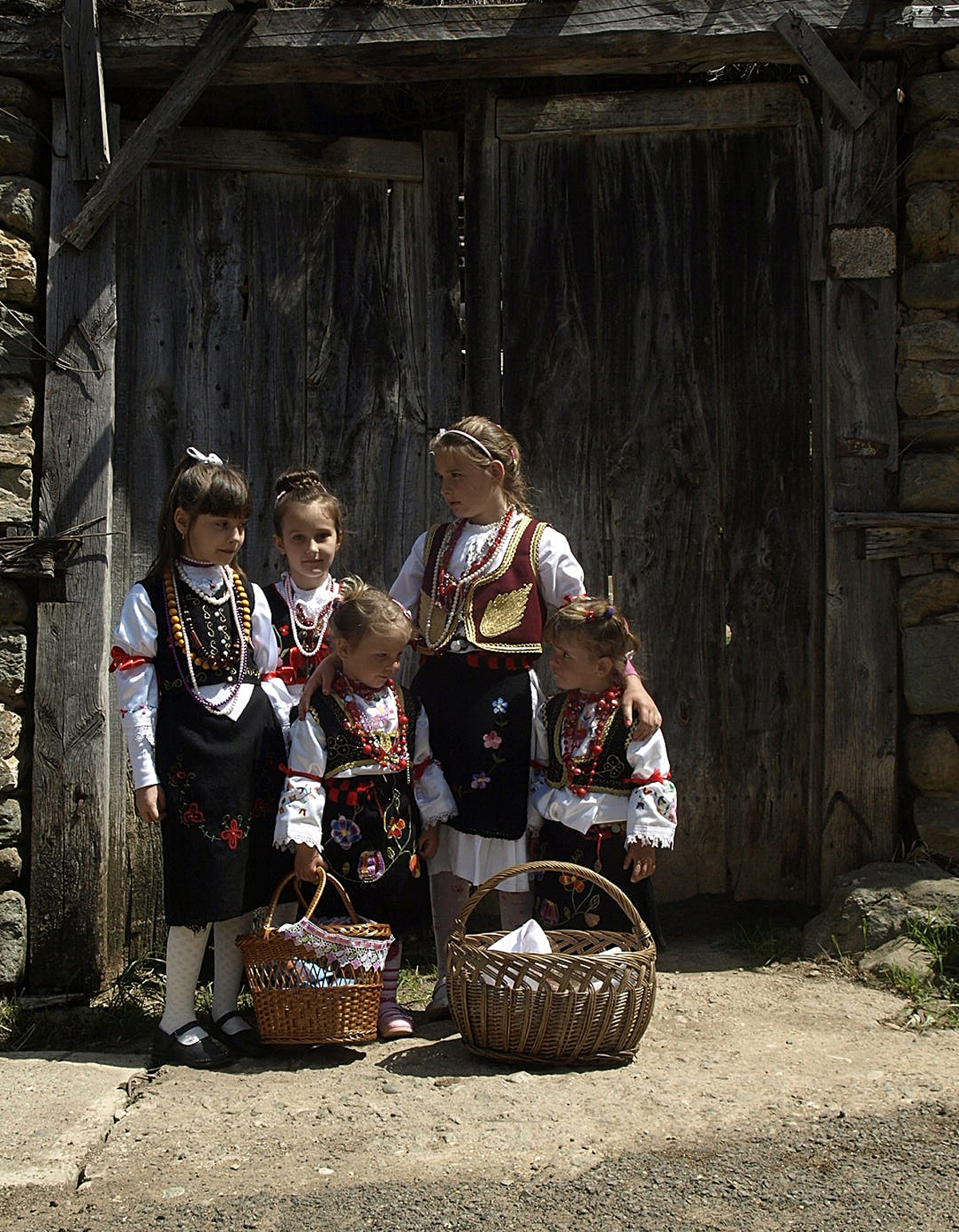
Girls from Štrpce in Serbian traditional costumes

Traditional Clothing is one of the major factors that has distinguished this nation from its neighboring countries. The motifs and patterns on these garments can be explained by prehistoric religion and chromatically there are three basic colors, the most symbolic of which is red. Overall, women's clothing was better preserved than men as there are regional variations in how these traditional clothes are worn. The most famous was the 'pështjellak', which consisted of a long white shirt and two aprons one for the front and one for the back. Another clothing style worn by the women of Kosovo is the xhubleta, which is a bell wavy skirt which is held by two straps on the shoulders, worn on top of a long-sleeved white linen shirt. The next style is often referred to as the most beautiful of Kosovo clothing. The Veshja e Dukagjinit was a white long sleeve cotton shirt but the edges were colorfully embodied. The last style for the women was that of the southern region of has. This clothing was more distinctive and is commonly found today as it has survived and embraced changes in styles. This look consists of a short white shirt and a full-length linen dress. Men's clothing was a symbol of beauty, however it was less preservative. Unlike women's clothing men's clothing is more uniformed and seemed to change less from region to region. The most popular was the "tirqi" apparel. The look similar to women with the white shirt and vest, the tirqi which were woolen white pants where strictly a characteristic of the men.babies

=== Traditional food in Kosovo ===
The best-known of all and most distinctive one, "flija", is prepared year-round but is a summer favourite. The Kosovo cuisine developed under the influence Albanian, Turkish, Serbian, Croatian Greek and Italian dishes. The national food of Kosovo is Cheese Byrek. Byrek is a type of baked or filled pastry. They are made of a thin flaky dough known as phyllo dough and are filled with salty cheese (often feta), minced meat, potatoes or other vegetables. Meat is well represented in their daily meals. Due to the harsh continental climate vegetables are seasonal flourishing mainly in the summer.

== Intangible culture ==
Generally speaking, Albanians are a very secular people. The majority of the Albanian people in Kosovo are of Muslim background and there is still a high percentage of Muslims in Kosovo. On the other hand, the Spiritual Kosovan Culture is not very influenced by the religion. One can quote a line from a poem of Pashko Vasa, a 19th-century Catholic writer, who said that "The religion of the Albanians is Albanianism", meaning that the Albanians identity doesn't derive from their religion. What influences the Kosovan-Albanian cultural heritage the most is the Kanun. This set of laws and rules used to be oral and got published later. Due to the fact that a part of them is very primitive, they aren't used as much anymore, however these rules are a great part of the Kosovar cultural heritage.

=== Folklore ===
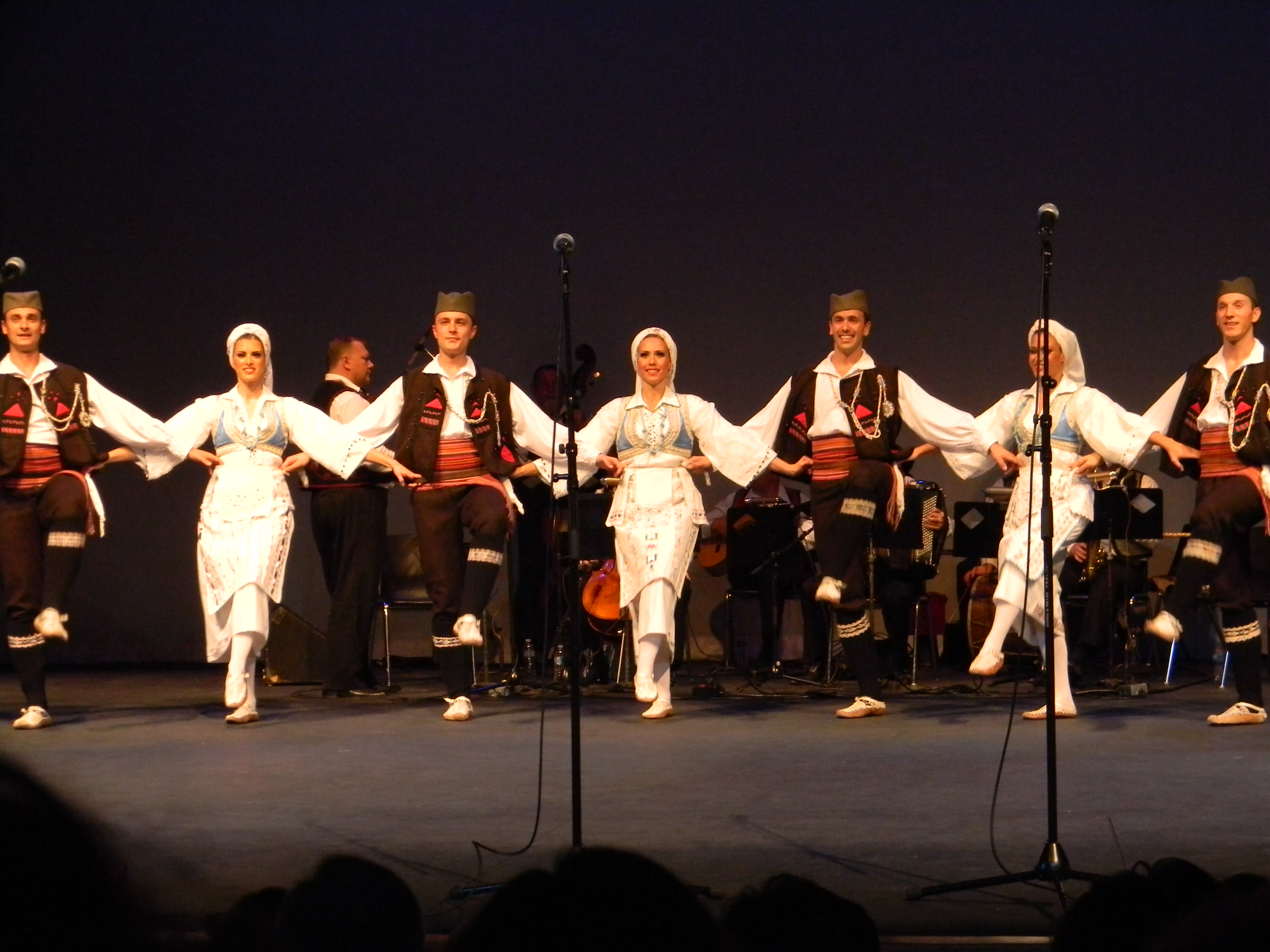
Serbian traditional dance (kolo) from Gnjilane

All three mark important facts of the Kosovar culture today. Kosovo has 2 official languages, Albanian and Serbian. Although they have strong Turkish roots in their folkloric music, the mass are not fluent in Turkish, it is only the elders in secular groups and municipalities that speak Turkish. The influence of the Ottomans had a spill-over effect of cultural and religious identity which resulted in the construction of many religious monuments and artifacts in Kosovo. Over 90% of Kosovar-Albanians are of Islamic religion primarily due to the occupation of the Ottoman Empire. Aside from Turkish-religious-structural influences, the current Kosovar culture was also influenced by other ethnic minorities within the region constituting, but not limited to: Roma, Serb, Bosnian, Ashkali, Gorani, etc. Thus, instruments like the Kemenche and traditional dances such as Hora from the Turkish culture become a symbol of Kosovar ethnic identity. Similarly, the instrument knows as the Cifteli, is also a widely used instrument in Kosovo with origins from the Turkish culture that dates back to the early Ottoman Empire.

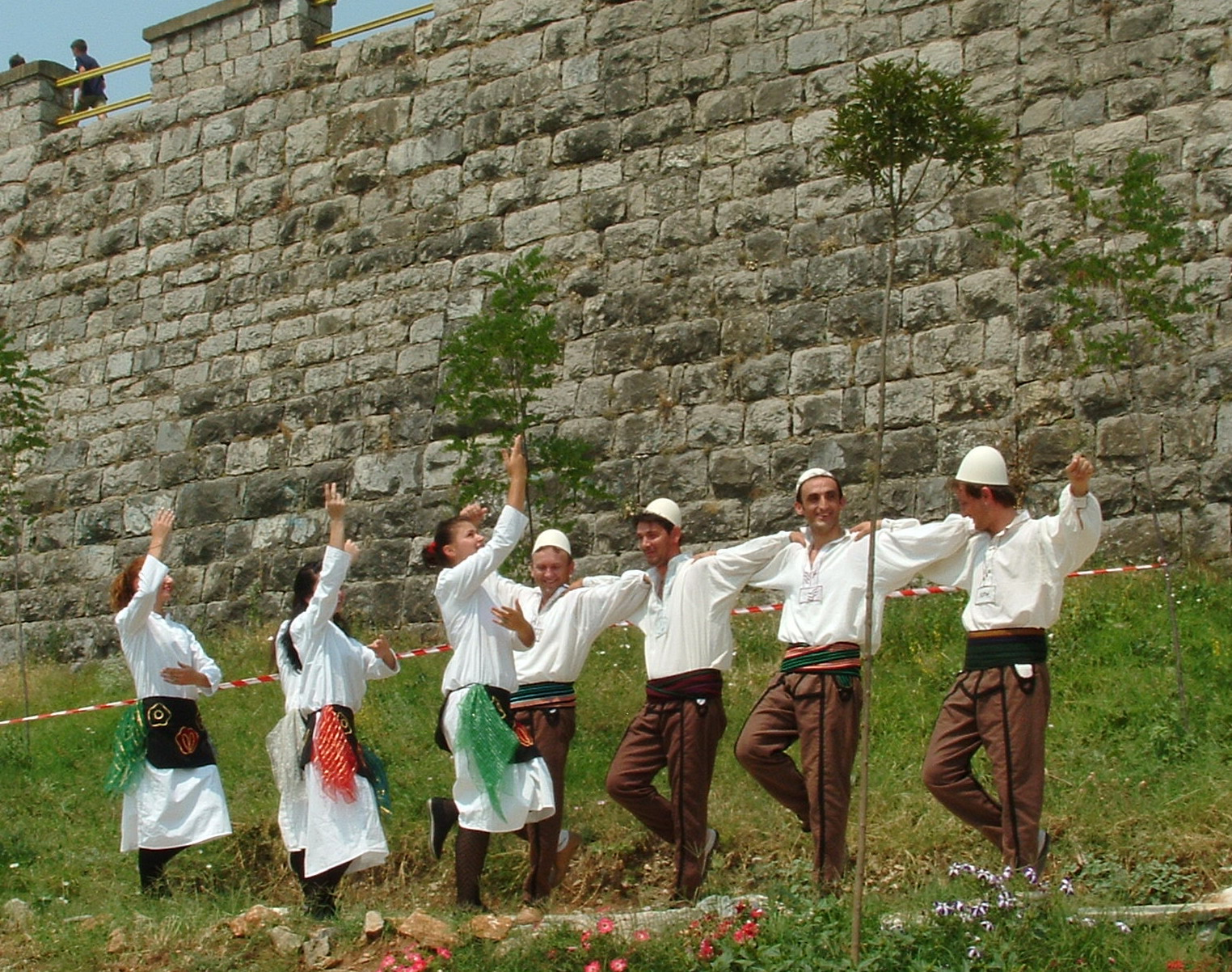
Albanian traditional Dance

=== Religion ===
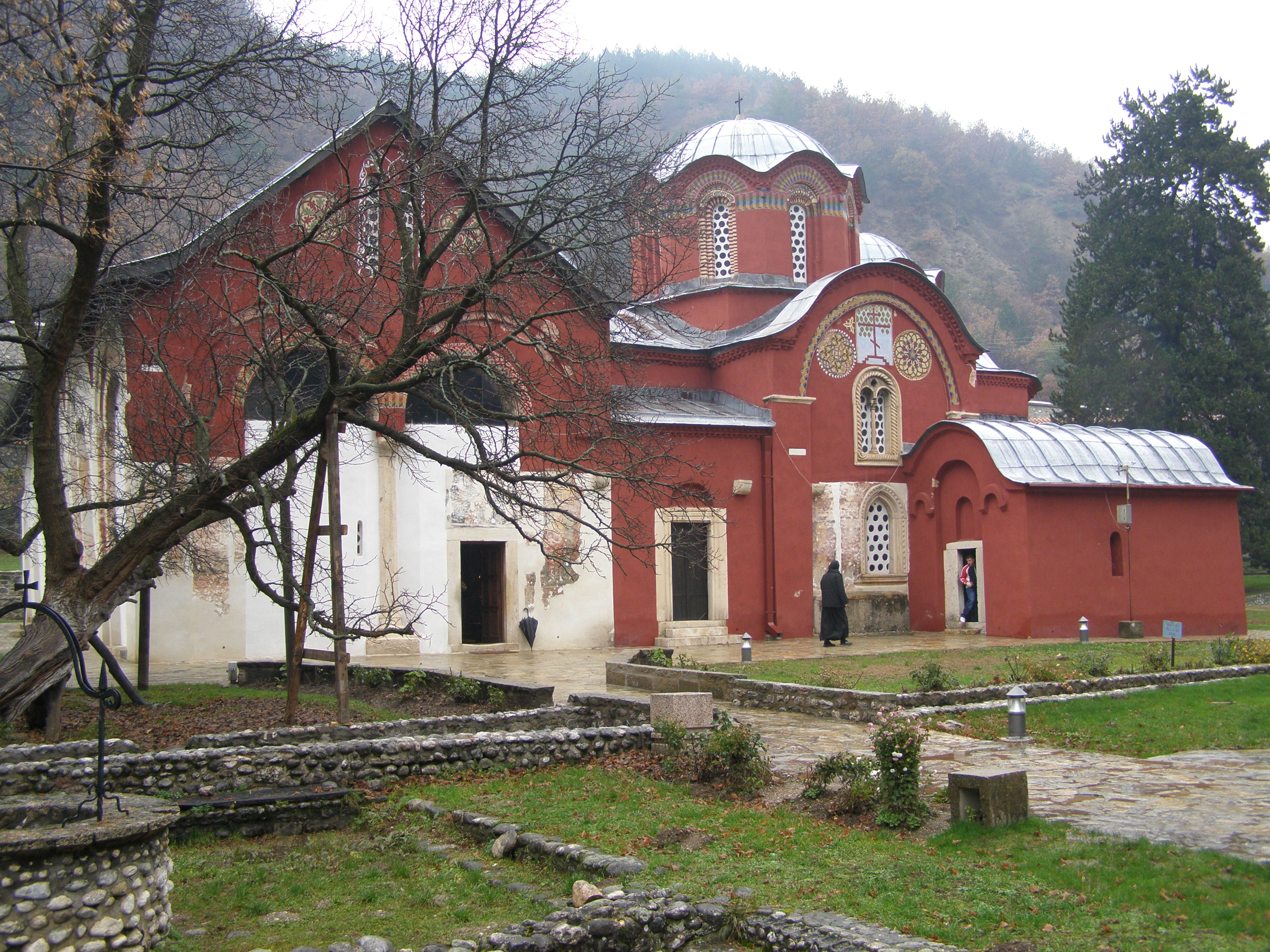
Patriarchate of Peć, the seat of the Serbian Orthodox Church from the 14th century

There is no official religion in Kosovo, although the country is predominantly Muslim as the majority of Albanians are Muslim. Most of the ethnic Serbs practice Eastern Orthodoxy.

=== Oral history ===
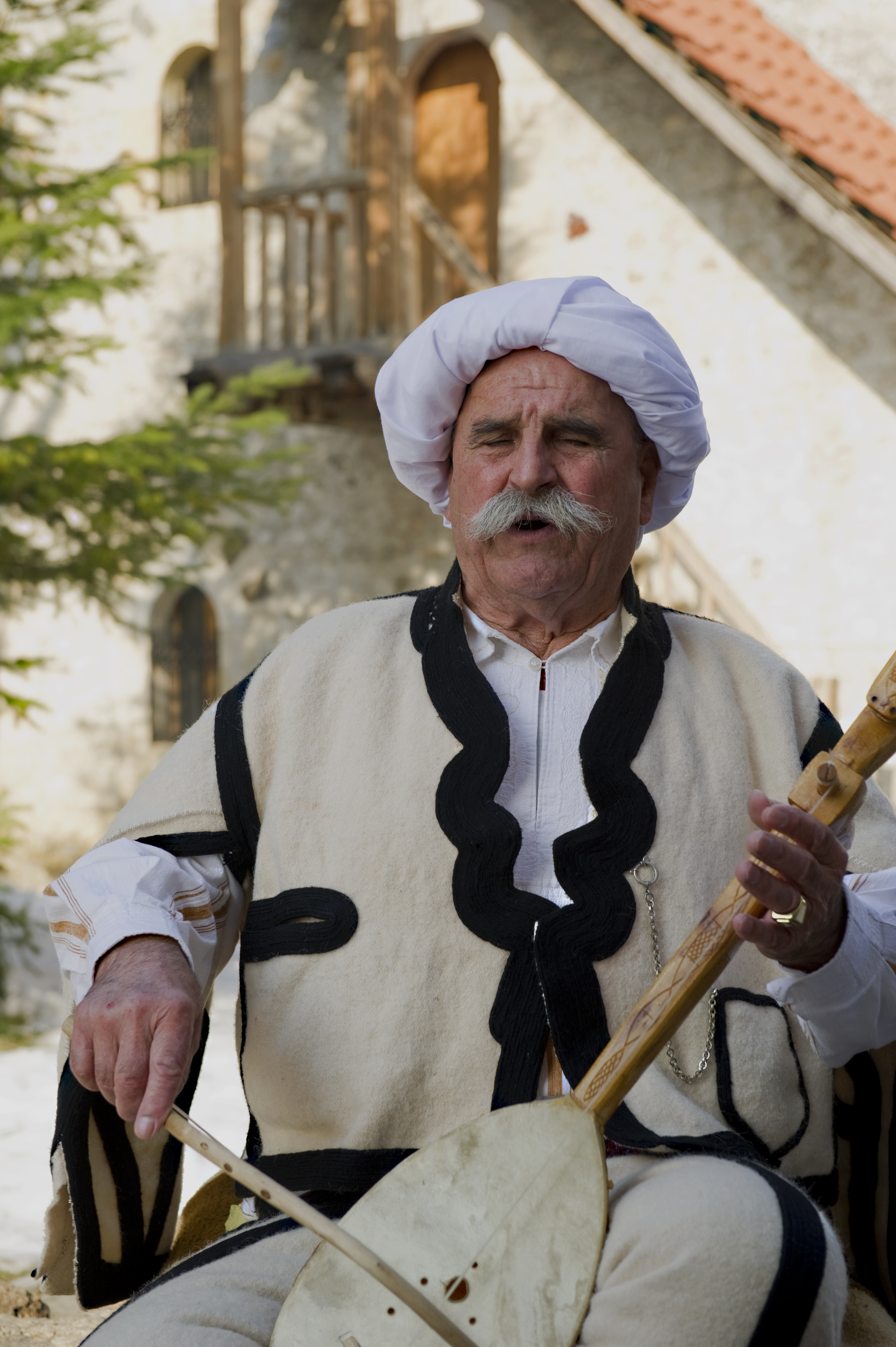
Lahutari - An old man telling a story

==== Besa ====
"Besa" is a famous feature of all Albanian people. It mainly represents a "word of honor" or "promise".

==== Kanun ====
Kanun is a set of unwritten laws and rules which were only published in the 20th century. Kanun of Lekë Dukaghini is composed of 12 books and 1,262 articles. These are the twelve books:

1. Church;
2. Family;
3. Marriage;
4. House, Livestock and Property;
5. Work;
6. Transfer of Property;
7. Spoken Word;
8. Honor;
9. Damages;
10. Law Regarding Crimes;
11. The kanun of the elderly;
12. Exemptions and Exceptions.

=== Language preservation ===
The Albanian Language is the main language in Kosovo. Albanian, has two main dialects: Geg (in the northern part) and Tosk (in the southern part). Therefore, the Albanian language spoken in Kosovo is much more similar to the Geg dialect, even though the standard Albanian language has been established long ago based on the Tosk dialect. However, the main official language in Kosovo is: standard Albanian. Despite that, minorities in Kosovo still strive to protect their own languages.

== Protecting the cultural heritage ==
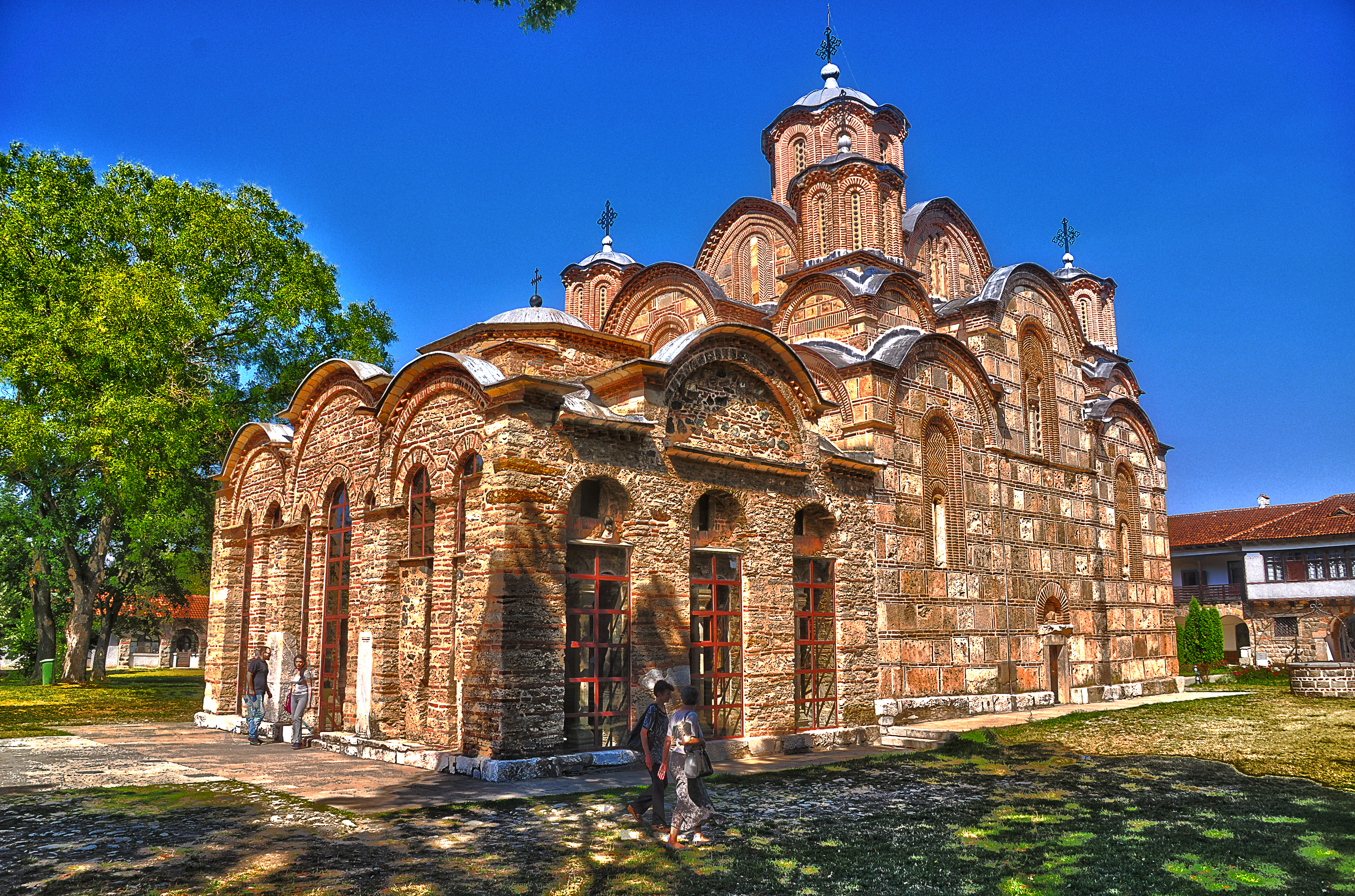
Gračanica Monastery was inscribed on the List of World Heritage in Danger

Because of the Wars (especially the recent one) that took place in Kosovo, many monuments and other cultural properties of Kosovo were destroyed or stolen. During the 1998-1999 conflict, more than a third of Kosovo's 600 mosques were damaged or destroyed. Kosovo's Islamic heritage suffered devastating events during the "ethnic cleansing" operations. Qurans were found with pages ripped out and spread with feces, and valuable collections of Islamic manuscripts were burned. During the 2004 unrest in Kosovo, Human Rights Watch estimated that 29 Serbian Orthodox Churches and Monasteries were burned or destroyed. UNESCO, in cooperation with the United Nations Interim Administration Mission in Kosovo works to safeguard cultural heritage and has assisted in the reconstruction of the Dečani Monastery and Gračanica Monastery among others.

Preservation of cultural heritage is always difficult to discuss since every side in the wars made a contribution to the destruction rather than preserving the architecture of the other ethnicity. Preserving what is left and restoring what is lost, is one of the main goals of the Ministry of Culture, Youth and Sport. Other agencies such as the Ministry of Foreign Affairs, the Ministry of Environment and Spatial Planning and many other non-governmental organisations such as the CHwB and the RIC are also dedicated to rescuing and preserving tangible and intangible cultural heritage touched by conflict, neglect or human and natural disasters.

There are many projects that are organised for this cause and one of them is the annual "Tour de Culture", which attracts many people from many countries. In this event, many monuments all around Kosovo are promoted and the interesting part is that all of the transport is done by bicycles. This project is organised by CHwB and UN Habitat and has had great success in the past years.

== See also ==
- Literature of Kosovo
- Monuments of Kosovo
- Destruction of Albanian heritage in Kosovo
- Culture of Kosovo
- Destruction of Serbian heritage in Kosovo
