= Graboc i Poshtëm =

Graboc i Poshtëm: Graboc i Poshtëm (Albanian); Доњи Грабовац/Donji Grabovac (Serbian)
- Village
- Location within Kosovo
- Coordinates: 42.648269°N 21.005370°E
- Location: Kosovo
- District: Prishtinë
- Municipality: Fushë Kosovë

Population (2024)
  - Total: 758
- Time zone: UTC+1 (Central European Time)
  - Summer (DST): UTC+2 (CEST)

Graboc i Poshtëm (Albanian: also Graboci i Poshtëm, Serbian: Доњи Грабовац, romanized: Donji Grabovac) is a village in municipality Fushë Kosova, Kosovo.

== Demography ==
Demographics
Year	Population
1948	571
1953	652
1961	679
1971	878
1981	1 160
1991	1 220
2011	1 017
Ref: Federal Office of Statistics and Evidence of Federal People's Republic of Yugoslavia and Socialist Federal Republic of Yugoslavia, census for 1948, 1953, 1961, 1971, 1981. and 1991.
