= Harilaq (village) =

Village in Kosovo

Harilaq Harilaq
- Village
- Location within Kosovo
- Coordinates: 42.583438°N 21.000388°E
- Location: Kosovo
- District: Prishtinë
- Municipality: Fushë Kosovë

Population (2024)
  - Total: 669

Harilaq is a village in the municipality of Fushë Kosovë, Kosovo.

== History ==
The village has one of the most antique castles in Balkan, Harilaq Fortress (Albanian: Kalaja e Harilaqit).

Until 1988 the village belonged to the municipality of Pristina, when it was included in the newly-formed Fushë Kosovë municipality.
