= Culture of the Western Balkans =

Culture of the Western Balkans may refer to:

- Culture of Albania
- Culture of Kosovo
- Culture of North Macedonia
- Culture of Serbia
- Culture of Montenegro
- Culture of Bosnia and Herzegovina

== See also ==
- Culture of Europe
- Cultural policies of the European Union
