= Golesh =

Mountain in Kosovo

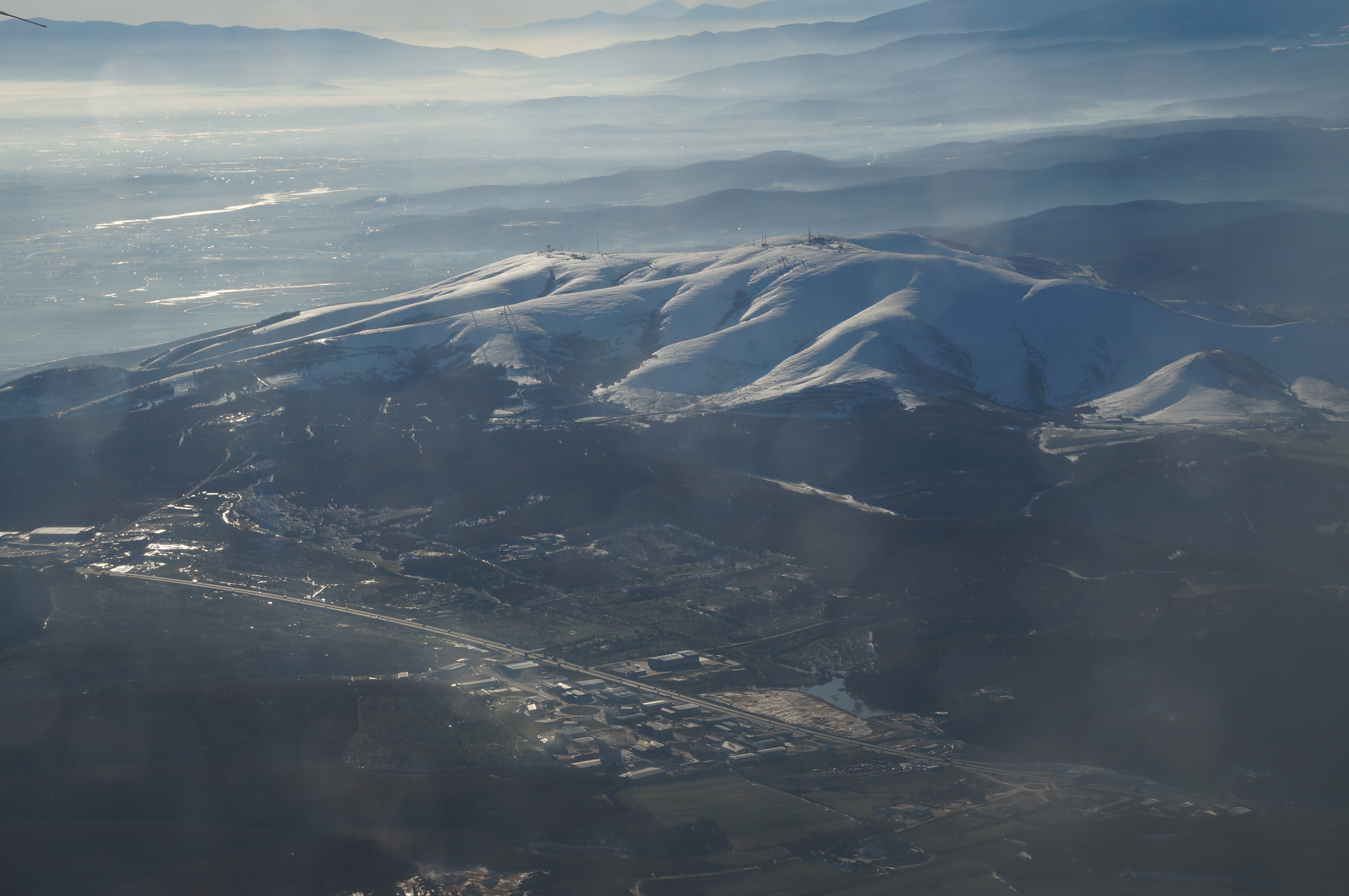
- The mountain during winter covered in snow, seen from the north

Highest point
- Elevation: 1,019 m (3,343 ft)
- Coordinates: 42°34′7″N 20°58′40″E

Naming
- Pronunciation: Albanian pronunciation: [ɡolɛʃ]

Geography
- Location within Kosovo
- Location: Municipality of Lipjan
- Country: Kosovo

Golesh is a mountain in Kosovo with an altitude of 1,019 m (3,343 ft). The peak is located in the municipality of Lipjan and it is near the Pristina International Airport Adem Jashari.

A branch of the Drenica River originates on the mountain. At the top, there is an FM/TV broadcasting centre.

The mountain contains the world's largest vein magnesite deposit, with total reserves of around five million tonnes; mining began in 1923. The Goleš mine was one of the largest magnesite mines in the country. It was shut down in early 2002.
