= Culture of Kosovo =

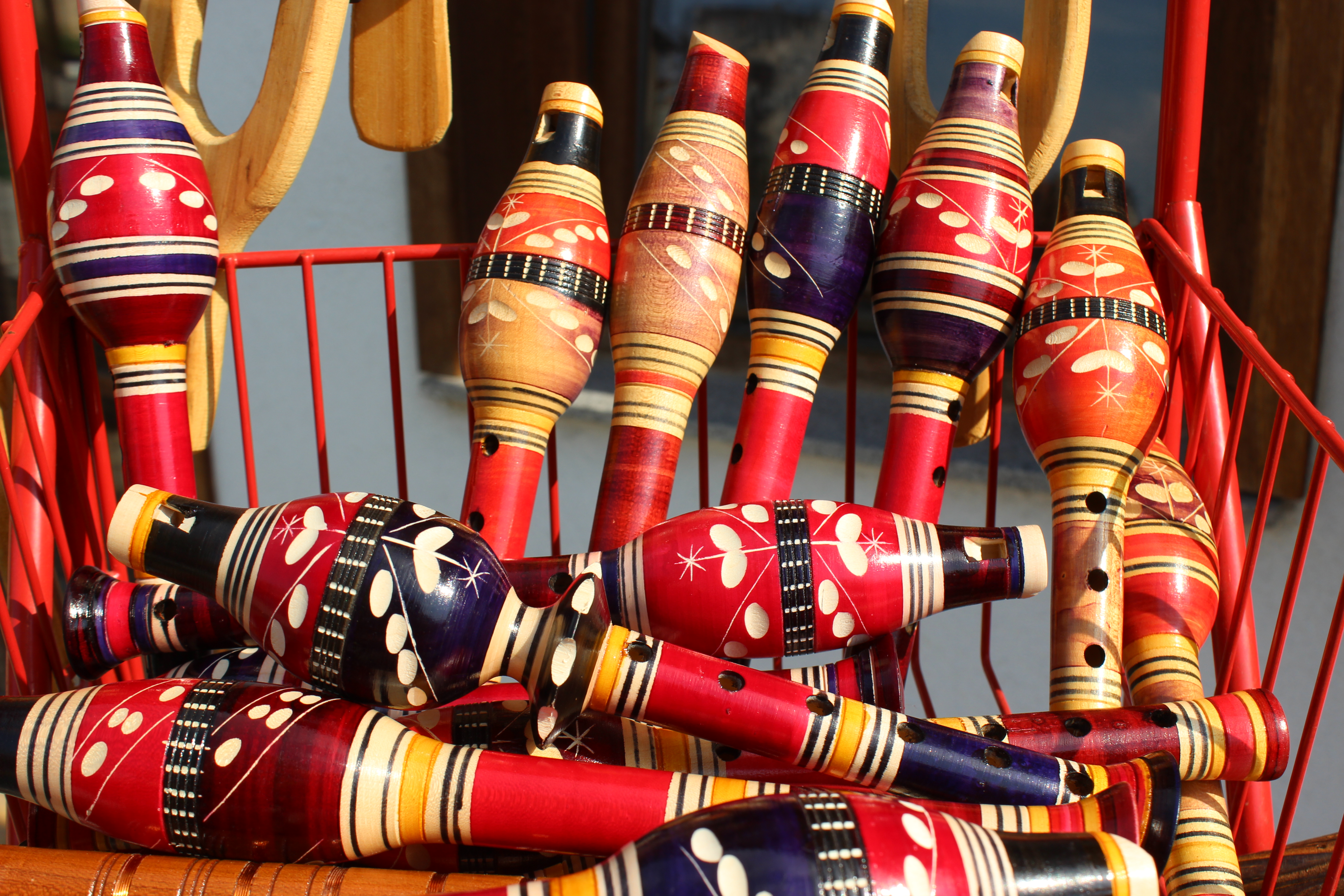
Traditional handmade instruments in Prizren

The culture of Kosovo refers to the culture of Kosovo. It encompasses the ancient heritage, architecture, literature, visual arts, music, cinema, sports and cuisine of Kosovo. Because of its history and geography, it represents a blend of different cultural spheres especially of the western and eastern culture.

The society of Kosovo has undergone considerable changes over the last centuries, one of the most notable being the increasing level of secularity. The national identity revolves more around the language and culture, than the religion.

Due to Albanians making up the majority of Kosovo's population, the culture tends to be Albanian with slight variations.

== See also ==
- Cultural Heritage of Kosovo
- Architecture of Kosovo
- Literature of Kosovo
- Culture of Kosovo Serbs
- Culture of Albania
- Culture of the Western Balkans (disambiguation)
