= Kosovo Polje =

City and municipality in Kosovo

Kosovo Polje Fushë Kosova: Fushë Kosova or Fushë Kosovë (Albanian) Kosovo Polje or Косово Поље (Serbian)
- City and municipality
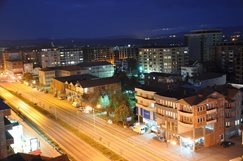
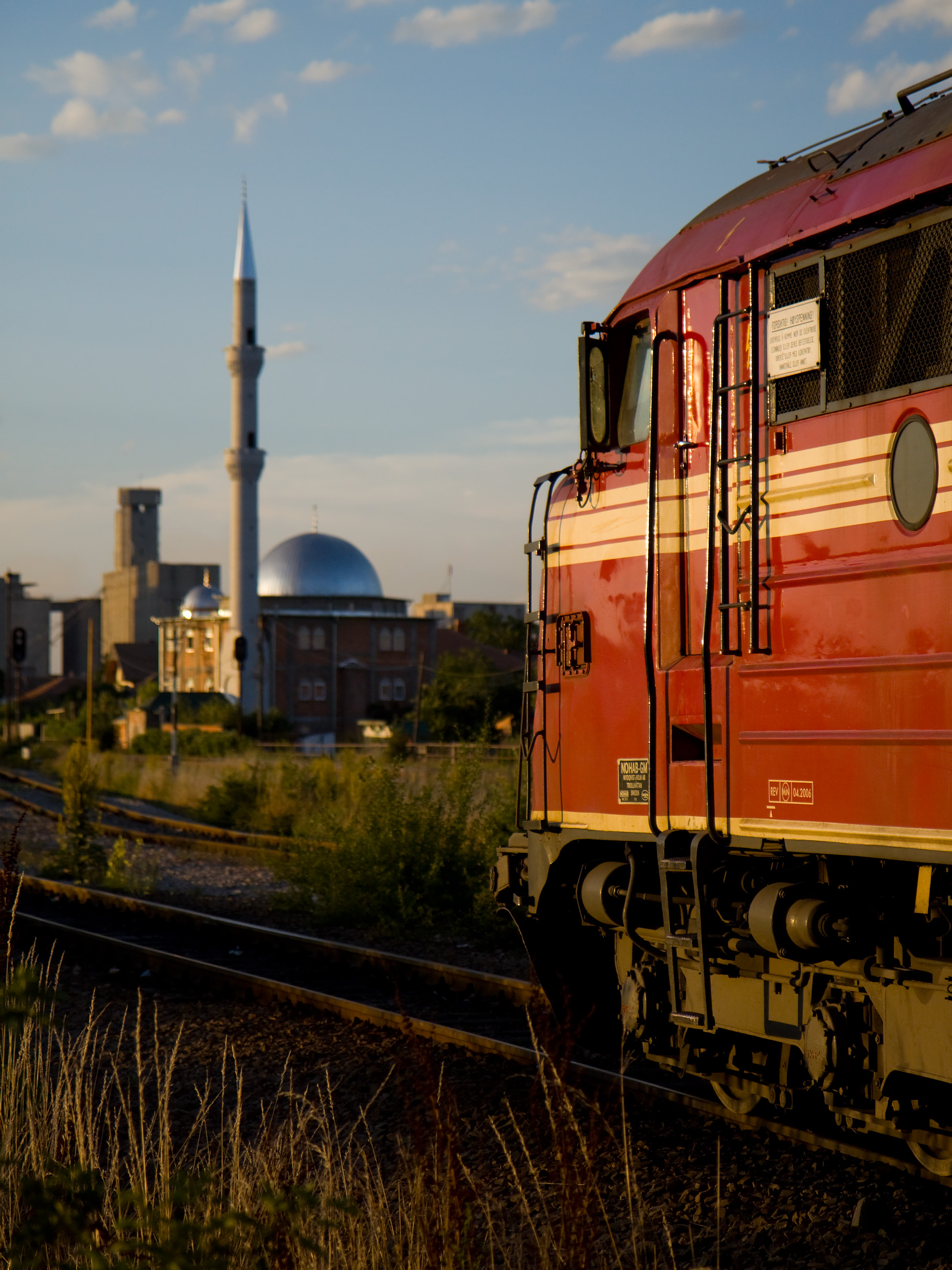
- The city at night Kosovo Railways Museum View of the mosque

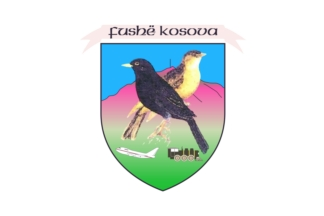
- Flag Emblem
- Interactive map of Kosovo Polje; Fushë Kosova
- Location within Kosovo
- Coordinates: 42°38′N 21°5′E
- Country: Kosovo
- District: Pristina

Government
  - Mayor: Valon Prebreza (LVV)

Area
  - Municipality: 84.09 km^{2} (32.47 sq mi)
- Elevation: 543 m (1,781 ft)

Population (2024)
  - Municipality: 63,949
  - Rank: 8th in Kosovo
  - Density: 760.5/km^{2} (1,970/sq mi)
  - Urban: 40,962
- Time zone: UTC+1 (CET)
  - Summer (DST): UTC+2 (CEST)
- Postal code: 12000
- Area code: +383 38
- Vehicle registration: 01
- Website: fushekosove.rks-gov.net/en/

Kosovo Polje (Serbian Cyrillic: Косово Поље) or Fushë Kosova (Albanian indefinite form: Fushë Kosovë) is a city and municipality located in the District of Pristina in Kosovo. The municipality has an area of 84.09 km^{2} (32.47 sq mi) and in 2024 had 63,949 inhabitants making it the eighth most populous municipality in Kosovo.

== Etymology ==
Kosovo Polje was named after the Kosovo Field.

== History ==
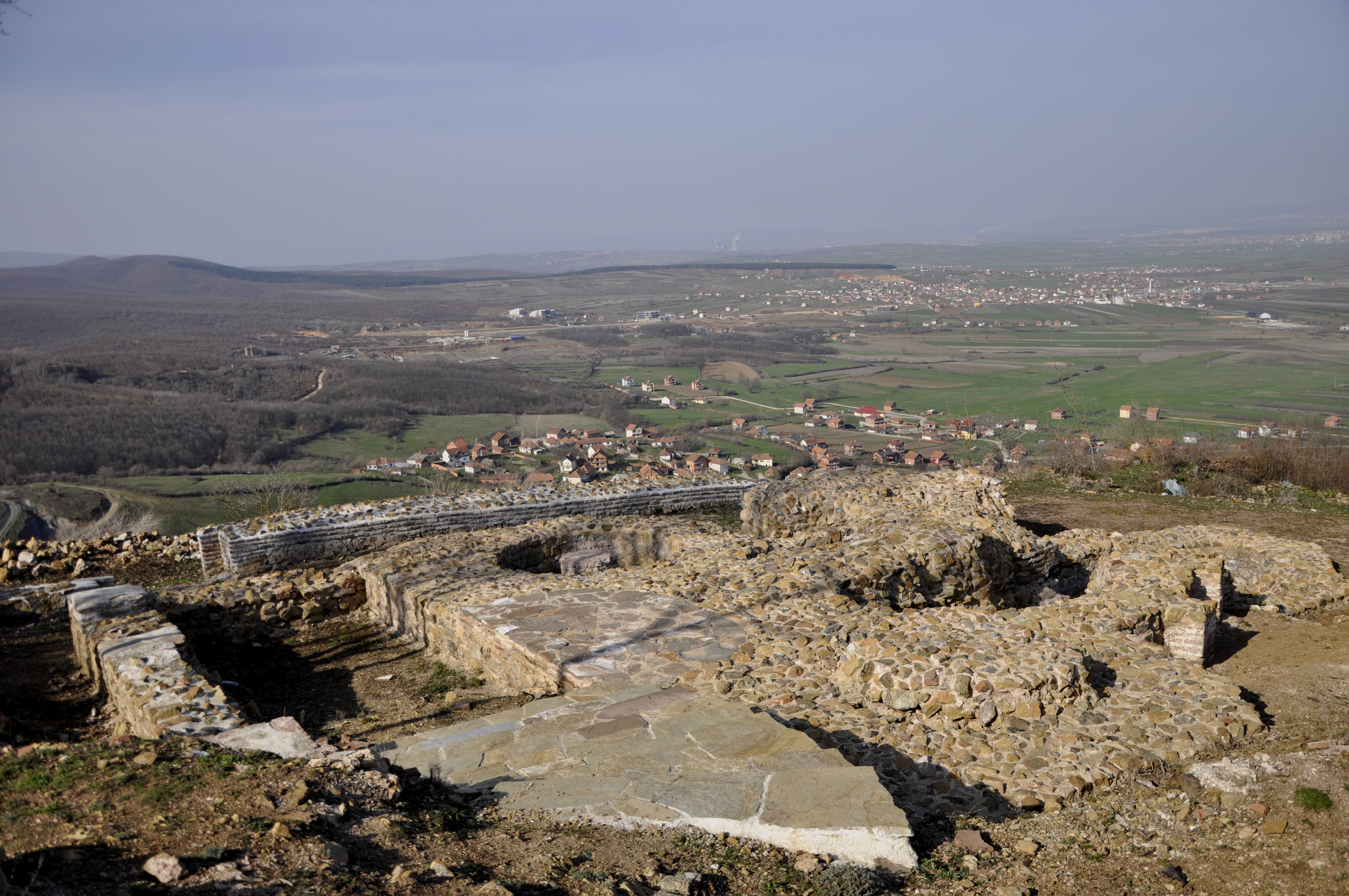
Harilaq Fortress is one of the most excavated areas in Kosovo.

=== Antiquity ===
In the municipality of Kosovo Polje lies the Harilaq Fortress. The fortress has a great archaeological importance, because its roots date back to prehistoric times while its peak development occurred during late Antiquity through the early Byzantine period.

=== Interwar Period ===
During the Interwar Period, as part of Yugoslav colonisation of Kosovo, the municipality was heavily affected. Serb colonist families were settled both in the town itself and across several villages, newly established settlements or within existing villages. These settlers originated mainly from Montenegro, Serbia, the Serb-inhabited regions of Bosnia and Herzegovina, and other regions.

In the town itself, approximately 142 Serb settler families were established in 1921. The village of Bardh i Madh received around 23 colonist families, mainly near the railway station, while Graboc i Poshtëm and Harilaq received about 20 and 18 families respectively, some of which settled in houses formerly owned by local Albanians. The village of Miradi e Epërme experienced one of the largest settlements of Serb colonisers, with around 80 families from various regions. Pomozotin received about 40 families, partly in a separate area near the old village, where a church was built in 1937. Sllatina e Madhe received approximately 33 families, while Vragolia received around 11 families, mainly along the main road. In addition, a new Slavic colonist settlement, Krivova, was established on the road between Sllatina e Madhe and the Drenica region. Due to its strategic location, a gendarmerie station was built there and around 25 colonist families were settled after 1922.

In 1937, the Fushë Kosova–Peja railway line was opened to traffic.

=== Kosovo War ===
In the city suburbs there is the Multinational Specialized Unit base. Part of KFOR, the unit is composed entirely by Italian Carabinieri.

== Geography ==
Kosovo Polje is a municipality that lies in the center of the Kosovo Plain, with an area of 84 km^{2} (32 sq mi) and an altitude of 540 m (1,772 ft) above sea level. The city is situated between Pristina in the east, Obiliq in the north, Gračanica in the south and Drenas in the west. It consists of 16 settlements. It is located in the area of the intersection of roads important for transport, such as the railway connecting Kosovo Polje with Skopje and Mitrovica, which then connects to international roads. Also, it is located at the intersection of important highways. The Pristina International Airport is also located on its territory.

=== Climate ===
Kosovo Polje has a medium continental climate. It is located in the Kosovo field, which is in the Ibri plain in the north and in the Llapi plain, in the north-east, open to northern continental climatic influences. Winter is cold, while summer is warm and dry. The Kosovo field, due to limitations with high mountains in the south and west, are deprived of the air masses of the Adriatic Sea and the Aegean Sea. The coldest month is January while the warmest is August.

== Demographics ==
According to the last census of 2024 by the Kosovo Agency of Statistics, municipality had a population of 63,949, with 40,962 living in the urban area. Fushë Kosovë is one of the fastest growing cities in Kosovo due to the proximity with the capital city of Pristina, which is located just a few kilometers away.

Municipal historical population
Year	Pop.	±%
1948	8,041	—
1953	9,288	+15.5%
1961	12,286	+32.3%
1971	20,889	+70.0%
1981	29,805	+42.7%
1991	35,570	+19.3%
2011	34,827	−2.1%
2024	63,949	+83.6%

Before the 1999 Kosovo War, the town of Kosovo Polje had 35,570 residents (March 1991), with an ethnic composition of 56.6% Albanian, 23.7% Serb, and 19.6% other communities. The 2011 census recorded 34,827 inhabitants.

The overwhelming majority of the inhabitants are Albanians (91.32%). Other ethnic groups include Ashkali and Balkan Egyptians (5%), Serbs (<1%) and Roma (<1%).

The Albanians of Fushë Kosovë speak the Gheg dialect of the Albanian language.

== Economy ==
There are two magnesium mines operating on the territory of Kosovo Polje: Goleš and Strezovce.

== See also ==
- Kosovo Railways Museum
