= Kosovo Railways Museum =

Railway museum in Kosovo

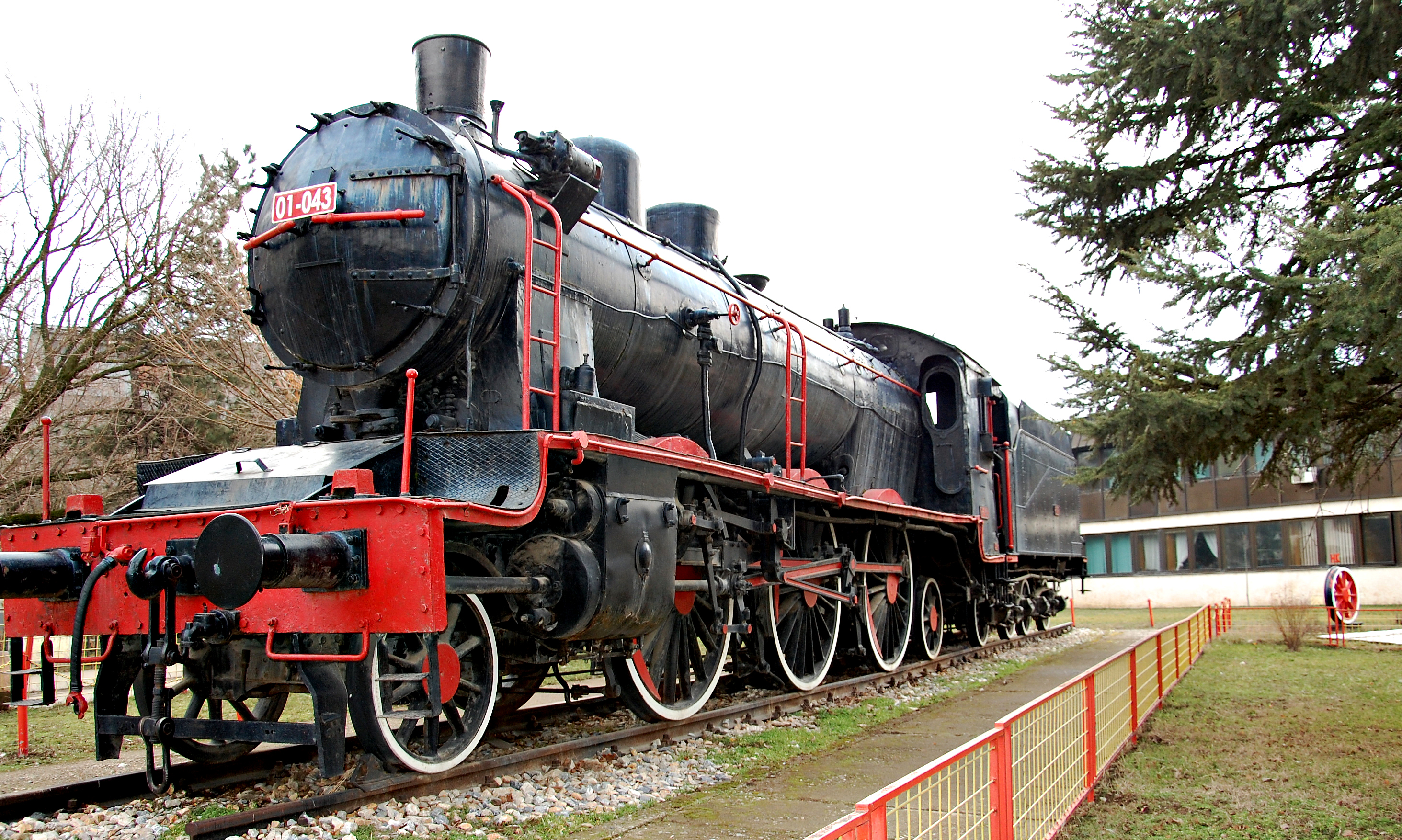
Kosovo Railways Museum - Fushë Kosova

The Kosovo Railways Museum (Albanian: Muzeu i Hekurudhave të Kosovës) is a museum in Fushë Kosova, Kosovo. It was founded in September 2006 and is housed in the Fushë Kosova Railway Station as the largest railway station in Kosovo and headquarters of Kosovo Railways.

== See also ==
- Kosovo Railways
- Fushë Kosova Railway Station
