= Goleš mine =

Magnesium mine in Kosovo

- Location: Kosovo Polje, Pristina district, Kosovo
- Products: Magnesite, Silica
- Company: Ferronikeli

The Goleš mine was one of the largest magnesite mines in Kosovo, located in Kosovo Polje, Pristina District. The mine has reserves of 1.74 million tonnes of ore, 46.23% magnesite and 2.66% silica, amounting to 804,400 tonnes of magnesite and 46,300 tonnes of silica. It was shut down in early 2002.
