= Dua Lipa discography =

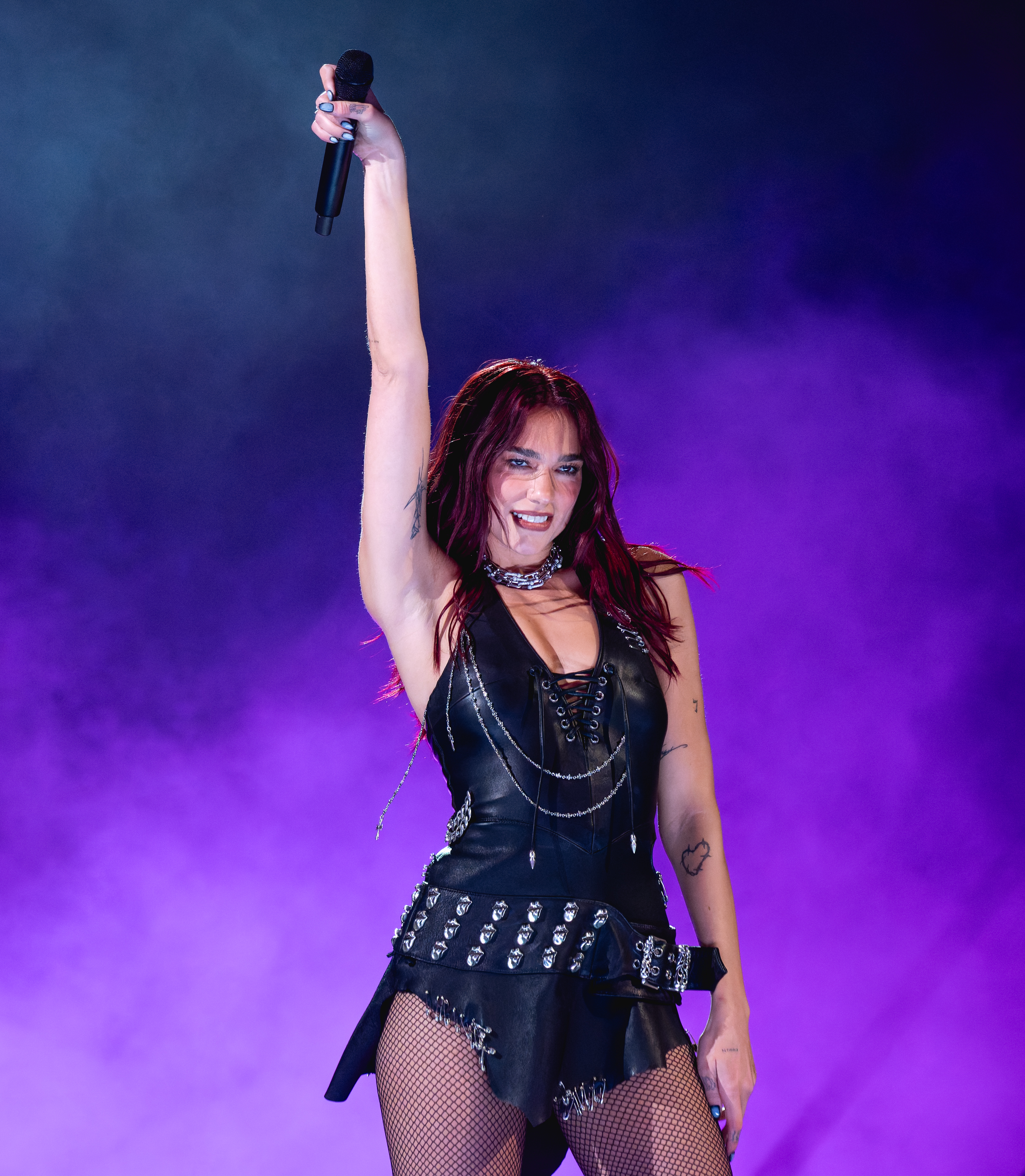
- Lipa performing on her Radical Optimism Tour in 2024.
- Studio albums: 3
- EPs: 5
- Live albums: 2
- Remix albums: 1
- Singles: 38
- Music videos: 39
- Reissues: 2
- Promotional singles: 12
- Charity singles: 2

The English singer Dua Lipa has released three studio albums, two reissues, one remix album, two live albums, five extended plays (EPs), thirty-eight singles (including nine as a featured artist), twelve promotional singles, two charity singles, and thirty-five music videos. After signing with Warner Bros. Records, she released her debut single "New Love" in 2015. The following year, she gained recognition through the singles "Hotter than Hell" and "Blow Your Mind (Mwah)". In 2017, Lipa released her self-titled debut studio album, which reached the top 10 charts in Australia, Belgium, Ireland, the Netherlands, New Zealand, Sweden and the United Kingdom. The album's chart-topping hits "Be the One", "New Rules" and "IDGAF" propelled Lipa to international fame.

"New Rules" was Lipa's first number one single in the UK; the charity single "Bridge over Troubled Water", dedicated to victims of the Grenfell Tower fire, on which Lipa performed and also topped the UK Singles Chart. She reissued her album in 2018 as Dua Lipa: Complete Edition, inserting several of her already released collaborations—including "One Kiss" with Calvin Harris, a song which spent eight weeks atop the UK Singles Chart.

In 2020, Lipa released her second studio album, Future Nostalgia. Later, she supported the album with the release of its remix album Club Future Nostalgia, a collaboration with the Blessed Madonna, and with its reissue Future Nostalgia: The Moonlight Edition. Future Nostalgia reached number one in Australia, Ireland, the Netherlands, New Zealand and the UK. Its lead single "Don't Start Now" was a commercial success, reaching the top 10 in several international markets and number one in Ireland. On the UK Singles Chart, the song became the longest top 10 stay for a British female artist and the longest top 10 stay without reaching the summit in that chart's history. The song alongside follow-up singles "Physical" and "Break My Heart" were simultaneously in the top 10 of the UK Singles Chart; she is the fifth female artist to have three singles simultaneously in the top ten.

As part of the Live Lounge Allstars, Lipa participated in the COVID-19 pandemic-relief charity single "Times Like These", which reached number one in the UK. "Levitating" from Future Nostalgia was a commercially successful single worldwide peaking at number 2 on the Billboard Global 200 chart, while also becoming the second longest running top 10 single and longest running without reaching number 1 in Billboard Hot 100 history. "Fever", a collaboration with Angèle from the album's French edition, tied the record for the longest running number one single on Belgium's Ultratop Wallonia singles chart. Lipa collaborated with Elton John on "Cold Heart (Pnau remix)" which became her third number one single in the UK while also reaching the top ten of several international charts.

== Albums ==
=== Studio albums ===
List of studio albums
Title	Details	Peak chart positions										Sales	Certifications
Title	Details	UK	AUS	BEL (FL)	CAN	GER	IRL	NLD	NZ	SWE	US	Sales	Certifications
Dua Lipa	Released: 2 June 2017; Label: Warner; Formats: CD, LP, digital download, streaming	3	8	6	14	22	3	6	7	8	27	UK: 1,170,683 (Note: United Kingdom sales figures for Dua Lipa as of June 2025)	BPI: 4× Platinum; ARIA: Platinum; BRMA: Platinum; BVMI: Gold; IFPI SWE: Gold; MC: 6× Platinum; NVPI: Platinum; RIAA: Platinum; RMNZ: 5× Platinum
Future Nostalgia	Released: 27 March 2020; Label: Warner; Formats: CD, LP, digital download, streaming, cassette	1	1	2	2	4	1	1	1	4	3	UK: 850,542 (Note: United Kingdom sales figures for Future Nostalgia as of June 2025)	BPI: 3× Platinum; ARIA: 2× Platinum; BRMA: Platinum; BVMI: Platinum; MC: 6× Platinum; NVPI: 2× Platinum; RIAA: Platinum; RMNZ: 6× Platinum
Radical Optimism	Released: 3 May 2024; Label: Warner; Formats: CD, LP, digital download, streaming, cassette	1	2	2	3	3	2	1	2	4	2	UK: 175,397 (Note: United Kingdom sales figures for Radical Optimism as of June 2025)	BPI: Gold; BRMA: Gold; MC: Platinum; NVPI: Platinum; RMNZ: Platinum

=== Reissues ===
List of reissues
Title	Details	Peak chart positions (Note: Dua Lipa: Complete Edition and Future Nostalgia: The Moonlight Edition were combined with chart entries for Dua Lipa and Future Nostalgia, thus charting as one release in all countries.)									
Title	Details	UK	AUS	BEL (FL)	CAN	GER	IRL	NLD	NZ	SWE	US
Dua Lipa: Complete Edition	Released: 19 October 2018; Label: Warner; Formats: CD, LP, digital download, streaming	9	13	12	28	84	3	16	20	47	42
Future Nostalgia: The Moonlight Edition	Released: 11 February 2021; Label: Warner; Formats: CD, LP, digital download, streaming	2	1	3	3	17	2	1	3	8	3

=== Live albums ===
List of live albums
Title	Details	Peak chart positions					
Title	Details	UK	AUS	BEL (FL)	FRA	IRL	NLD
Dua Lipa Live from the Royal Albert Hall	Released: 6 December 2024; Labels: Warner; Formats: CD, LP, digital download, streaming	40	—	5	46	—	58
Live from Mexico	Released: 22 May 2026; Labels: Warner; Formats: CD, LP, digital download, streaming	14	68	22	13	13	91

=== Remix albums ===
List of remix albums, with chart positions
Title	Details	Peak chart positions		
Title	Details	CAN	US	US Dance
Club Future Nostalgia (with the Blessed Madonna)	Released: 28 August 2020; Label: Warner; Formats: CD, LP, digital download, streaming	13	28	1

== Extended plays ==
List of extended plays
Title	Details	Peak chart positions
Title	Details	US Vinyl
Spotify Sessions	Released: 8 July 2016; Labels: Dua Lipa Limited, Universal Music GmbH; Formats: Streaming	—
Be the One	Released: 7 August 2016; Labels: Dua Lipa Limited, Universal Music GmbH; Formats: Digital download, streaming	—
The Only	Released: 2 April 2017; Label: Warner; Format: LP	21
Live Acoustic	Released: 8 December 2017; Label: Warner; Format: Digital download, streaming	—
Deezer Sessions	Released: 11 April 2019; Label: Warner; Format: Streaming	—
"—" denotes a record that did not chart or was not released in that country.

== Singles ==
=== As lead artist ===
List of singles
Title	Year	Peak chart positions										Certifications	Album
Title	Year	UK	AUS	BEL (FL)	CAN	GER	IRL	NLD	NZ	SWE	US	Certifications	Album
"New Love"	2015	—	—	—	—	—	—	—	—	—	—		Dua Lipa
"Be the One"	2015	9	6	1	—	11	25	11	20	100	—	BPI: 3× Platinum; ARIA: 2× Platinum; BRMA: Platinum; BVMI: Platinum; IFPI SWE: Gold; MC: Gold; NVPI: 2× Platinum; RIAA: Gold; RMNZ: 4× Platinum	Dua Lipa
"Last Dance"	2016	—	—	—	—	—	—	—	—	—	—		Dua Lipa
"Hotter than Hell"	2016	15	17	20	—	71	24	32	— (Note: "Hotter than Hell" did not enter the NZ Top 40 Singles Chart, but peaked at number five on the NZ Heatseeker Singles Chart.)	44	—	BPI: 2× Platinum; ARIA: Gold; BVMI: Gold; IFPI SWE: Platinum; MC: Platinum; NVPI: Platinum; RMNZ: Platinum	Dua Lipa
"Blow Your Mind (Mwah)"	2016	30	59	44	—	—	40	— (Note: "Blow Your Mind (Mwah)" did not enter the Dutch Top 100 Singles chart, but peaked at number four on the Dutch Single Tip chart.)	— (Note: "Blow Your Mind (Mwah)" did not enter the NZ Top 40 Singles Chart, but peaked at number six on the NZ Heatseeker Singles Chart.)	— (Note: "Blow Your Mind (Mwah)" did not enter the Swedish Singellista Chart, but peaked at number five on the Swedish Heatseeker Chart.)	72	BPI: Platinum; IFPI SWE: Gold; MC: 2× Platinum; RIAA: Gold; RMNZ: Platinum	Dua Lipa
"Scared to Be Lonely" (with Martin Garrix)	2017	14	14	10	32	9	12	3	8	3	76	BPI: 2× Platinum; ARIA: 3× Platinum; BRMA: Platinum; BVMI: 3× Gold; IFPI SWE: 4× Platinum; MC: 2× Platinum; NVPI: 3× Platinum; RIAA: 2× Platinum; RMNZ: 4× Platinum	Dua Lipa: Complete Edition
"Lost in Your Light" (featuring Miguel)	2017	86	—	—	—	—	97	—	— (Note: "Lost in Your Light" did not enter the NZ Top 40 Singles Chart, but peaked at number 10 on the NZ Heatseeker Singles Chart.)	—	—	BPI: Silver; MC: Gold; RMNZ: Gold	Dua Lipa
"New Rules"	2017	1	2	1	7	9	1	1	3	7	6	BPI: 6× Platinum; ARIA: 7× Platinum; BRMA: 2× Platinum; BVMI: 2× Platinum; IFPI SWE: 4× Platinum; MC: Diamond; RIAA: 5× Platinum; RMNZ: 7× Platinum	Dua Lipa
"IDGAF"	2018	3	3	4	29	12	1	8	5	15	49	BPI: 3× Platinum; ARIA: 4× Platinum; BRMA: Gold; BVMI: Gold; IFPI SWE: Platinum; MC: 9× Platinum; RIAA: 2× Platinum; RMNZ: 5× Platinum	Dua Lipa
"One Kiss" (with Calvin Harris)	2018	1	3	1	6	1	1	1	6	4	26	BPI: 6× Platinum; ARIA: 9× Platinum; BRMA: 2× Platinum; BVMI: 2× Platinum; MC: 3× Platinum; RIAA: 4× Platinum; RMNZ: 6× Platinum	96 Months and Dua Lipa: Complete Edition
"Electricity" (with Silk City featuring Diplo and Mark Ronson)	2018	4	22	6	61	64	6	13	25	51	62	BPI: 2× Platinum; ARIA: Platinum; BRMA: Gold; MC: Gold; RIAA: Platinum; RMNZ: 2× Platinum	Electricity and Dua Lipa: Complete Edition
"Swan Song"	2019	24	68	50	99	99	24	— (Note: "Swan Song" did not enter the Dutch Top 100 Singles chart, but peaked at number four on the Dutch Single Tip chart.)	— (Note: "Swan Song" did not enter the NZ Top 40 Singles Chart, but peaked at number five on the NZ Hot Singles Chart.)	67	— (Note: "Swan Song" did not enter the Billboard Hot 100, but peaked at number 4 on the Bubbling Under Hot 100 chart.)	BPI: Silver; MC: Gold	Alita: Battle Angel
"Don't Start Now"	2019	2	2	2	3	10	1	5	3	12	2	BPI: 5× Platinum; ARIA: 8× Platinum; BRMA: 2× Platinum; BVMI: 3× Gold; MC: Diamond; RIAA: 4× Platinum; RMNZ: 8× Platinum	Future Nostalgia
"Physical"	2020	3	9	3	54	14	2	15	16	42	60	BPI: 3× Platinum; ARIA: 2× Platinum; BRMA: 2× Platinum; BVMI: Platinum; MC: 4× Platinum; RIAA: Platinum; RMNZ: 3× Platinum	Future Nostalgia
"Break My Heart"	2020	6	7	14	13	26	3	12	12	21	13	BPI: 2× Platinum; ARIA: 2× Platinum; BRMA: Platinum; BVMI: Gold; MC: 5× Platinum; RIAA: Platinum; RMNZ: 3× Platinum	Future Nostalgia
"Hallucinate"	2020	31	—	—	—	—	40	55	— (Note: "Hallucinate" did not enter the NZ Top 40 Singles Chart, but peaked at number five on the NZ Hot Singles Chart.)	—	—	BPI: Platinum; MC: Platinum; RMNZ: Platinum	Future Nostalgia
"Un Día (One Day)" (with J Balvin, Bad Bunny and Tainy)	2020	72	—	— (Note: "Un Día (One Day)" did not enter the Ultratop 50 chart, but peaked at number one on the Ultratip chart.)	70	94	55	24	— (Note: "Un Día (One Day)" did not enter the NZ Top 40 Singles Chart, but peaked at number 20 on the NZ Hot Singles Chart.)	— (Note: "Un Día (One Day)" did not enter the Swedish Singellista Chart, but peaked at number four on the Swedish Heatseeker Chart.)	63	ARIA: Gold; MC: Platinum; RIAA: 15× Platinum (Latin)	Future Nostalgia: The Moonlight Edition
"Levitating (The Blessed Madonna remix)" (featuring Madonna and Missy Elliott)	2020	39	35	— (Note: "Levitating (The Blessed Madonna remix)" did not enter the Ultratop 50 chart, but peaked at number 32 on the Ultratip chart.)	— (Note: "Levitating (The Blessed Madonna remix)" did not enter the Canadian Singles Chart, but peaked at number 16 on the Hot Canadian Digital Songs Chart.)	—	41	— (Note: "Levitating (The Blessed Madonna remix)" did not enter the Dutch Top 100 Singles chart, but peaked at number 15 on the Dutch Single Tip chart.)	— (Note: "Levitating (The Blessed Madonna remix)" did not enter the NZ Top 40 Singles Chart, but peaked at number nine on the NZ Hot Singles Chart.)	— (Note: "Levitating (The Blessed Madonna remix)" did not enter the Swedish Singellista Chart, but peaked at number 11 on the Swedish Heatseeker Chart.)	— (Note: "Levitating (The Blessed Madonna remix)" did not enter the Billboard Hot 100, but peaked at number 10 on the Bubbling Under Hot 100 chart.)		Club Future Nostalgia
"Levitating" (solo or featuring DaBaby)	2020	5	4	32	1	16	4	23	5	20	2	BPI: 5× Platinum; ARIA: 15× Platinum; BRMA: Gold; BVMI: Platinum; MC: Diamond; RIAA: Diamond; RMNZ: 10× Platinum	Future Nostalgia
"Fever" (with Angèle)	2020	79	—	1	79	85	36	— (Note: "Fever" did not enter the Dutch Top 100 Singles chart, but peaked at number ten on the Dutch Single Tip chart.)	— (Note: "Fever" did not enter the NZ Top 40 Singles Chart, but peaked at number 11 on the NZ Hot Singles Chart.)	— (Note: "Fever" did not enter the Swedish Singellista Chart, but peaked at number 18 on the Swedish Heatseeker Chart.)	— (Note: "Fever" did not enter the Billboard Hot 100, but peaked at number 31 on Digital Song Sales chart.)	BPI: Silver; BRMA: 3× Platinum; MC: Platinum; RMNZ: Gold	Future Nostalgia (French edition)
"Real Groove (Studio 2054 remix)" (with Kylie Minogue)	2020	95	—	—	—	—	—	—	— (Note: "Real Groove (Studio 2054 remix)" did not enter the NZ Top 40 Singles Chart, but peaked at number eight on the NZ Hot Singles Chart.)	—	—		Disco: Guest List Edition
"We're Good"	2021	25	24	32	21	52	17	25	24	31	31	BPI: Gold; ARIA: Gold; BRMA: Gold; MC: 2× Platinum; RIAA: Gold; RMNZ: Platinum	Future Nostalgia: The Moonlight Edition
"Love Again"	2021	51	60	5	11	44	36	21	— (Note: "Love Again" did not enter the NZ Top 40 Singles Chart, but peaked at number three on the NZ Hot Singles Chart.)	—	41	BPI: Platinum; BVMI: Gold; MC: 4× Platinum; RMNZ: 2× Platinum	Future Nostalgia
"Cold Heart (Pnau remix)" (with Elton John)	2021	1	1	2	1	3	2	8	1	5	7	BPI: 5× Platinum; ARIA: 15× Platinum; BVMI: 3× Gold; IFPI SWE: 3× Platinum; MC: 7× Platinum; RIAA: 4× Platinum; RMNZ: 10× Platinum	The Lockdown Sessions
"Sweetest Pie" (with Megan Thee Stallion)	2022	31	24	—	19	76	14	— (Note: "Sweetest Pie" did not enter the Dutch Top 100 Singles chart, but peaked at number five on the Dutch Single Tip chart.)	33	59	15	BPI: Silver; MC: Platinum; RIAA: Platinum; RMNZ: Platinum	Traumazine
"Potion" (with Calvin Harris and Young Thug)	2022	16	32	—	31	85	9	45	35	40	71	BPI: Silver; ARIA: Gold; MC: Gold; RIAA: Gold; RMNZ: Gold	Funk Wav Bounces Vol. 2
"Dance the Night"	2023	1	3	1	4	7	1	4	5	25	6	BPI: 2× Platinum; ARIA: 4× Platinum; BRMA: Platinum; MC: 5× Platinum; RMNZ: 3× Platinum	Barbie the Album
"Houdini"	2023	2	7	1	5	9	6	8	13	13	11	BPI: Platinum; ARIA: 2× Platinum; BRMA: Platinum; BVMI: Gold; MC: 4× Platinum; RMNZ: 2× Platinum	Radical Optimism
"Training Season"	2024	4	12	7	11	16	6	20	10	15	27	BPI: Platinum; ARIA: 2× Platinum; BRMA: Platinum; BVMI: Gold; MC: 4× Platinum; RMNZ: 2× Platinum	Radical Optimism
"Illusion"	2024	9	21	13	28	76	14	38	32	24	43	BPI: Gold; ARIA: Platinum; BRMA: Gold; MC: Platinum; RMNZ: Gold	Radical Optimism
"End of an Era"	2025	—	—	—	—	—	—	—	— (Note: "End of an Era" did not enter the NZ Top 40 Singles Chart, but peaked at number 10 on the NZ Hot Singles Chart.)	—	—		Radical Optimism
"Two Hearts" (with Danny L Harle)	2026	— (Note: "Two Hearts" failed to chart on the official UK Singles Chart, but in the mid-week update for this chart it was at number 91. It charted on other UK charts, such as Independent Singles Chart at number 41 and Dance Singles Chart at number 28.)	—	—	—	— (Note: "Two Hearts" did not enter the German Singles Chart, but peaked at number 89 on the German Airplay Chart.)	—	—	— (Note: "Two Hearts" did not enter the NZ Top 40 Singles Chart, but peaked at number 27 on the NZ Hot Singles Chart.)	—	— (Note: "Two Hearts" did not enter the US Billboard Hot 100, but peaked at number 15 on Billboard Hot Dance/Pop Songs.)		Cerulean
"—" denotes a recording that did not chart or was not released in that country

=== As featured artist ===
List of singles
Title	Year	Peak chart positions										Certifications	Album
Title	Year	UK	AUS	CAN	GER	IRL	NLD	NZ	SWE	US	WW	Certifications	Album
"No Lie" (Sean Paul featuring Dua Lipa)	2016	10	—	— (Note: "No Lie" did not enter the Canadian Singles Chart, but peaked at number 20 on the Hot Canadian Digital Songs Chart.)	10	31	14	—	—	—	184	BPI: 3× Platinum; BVMI: 3× Gold; MC: Platinum; NVPI: Platinum; RMNZ: 3× Platinum	Mad Love the Prequel and Dua Lipa: Complete Edition
"If Only" (Andrea Bocelli featuring Dua Lipa)	2018	—	—	—	—	—	—	—	—	—	—		Sì
"Sugar (Remix)" (Brockhampton featuring Dua Lipa)	2020	—	—	—	—	—	—	—	—	—	—		Non-album single
"Prisoner" (Miley Cyrus featuring Dua Lipa)	2020	8	13	17	20	5	20	24	23	54	12	BPI: Platinum; ARIA: 2× Platinum; BRMA: Gold; BVMI: Gold; IFPI SWE: Gold; MC: Gold; RIAA: Platinum; RMNZ: 2× Platinum	Plastic Hearts and Future Nostalgia: The Moonlight Edition
"Demeanor" (Pop Smoke featuring Dua Lipa)	2021	14	43	26	—	20	—	— (Note: "Demeanor" did not enter the NZ Top 40 Singles Chart, but peaked at number two on the NZ Hot Singles Chart.)	41	86	62		Faith
"Handlebars" (Jennie featuring Dua Lipa)	2025	41	63	47	—	67	—	— (Note: "Handlebars" did not enter the NZ Top 40 Singles Chart, but peaked at number three on the NZ Hot Singles Chart.)	— (Note: "Handlebars" did not enter the Swedish Singellista Chart, but peaked at number two on the Swedish Heatseeker Chart.)	80	21		Ruby
"—" denotes a recording that did not chart or was not released in that country.

=== Promotional singles ===
List of promotional singles
Title	Year	Peak chart positions										Certifications	Album
Title	Year	UK	AUS	BEL (FL)	CAN	FRA	IRL	NLD	NZ	SWE	US	Certifications	Album
"Room for 2"	2016	—	—	—	—	—	—	—	—	—	—		Dua Lipa
"Thinking 'Bout You"	2017	—	—	— (Note: "Thinking 'Bout You" did not enter the Ultratop 50 chart, but peaked at number six on the Ultratip chart.)	—	—	—	—	—	—	—	MC: Gold	Dua Lipa
"My Love" (Wale featuring Major Lazer, Wizkid and Dua Lipa)	2017	—	—	— (Note: "My Love" did not enter the Ultratop 50 chart, but peaked at number 16 on the Ultratip chart.)	—	—	—	—	—	—	—		Shine
"Homesick"	2017	—	—	12	—	—	—	2	—	—	—	BPI: Silver; BRMA: Gold; MC: Gold; RMNZ: Gold	Dua Lipa
"Want To"	2018	—	83	—	—	—	52	—	— (Note: "Want To" did not enter the NZ Top 40 Singles Chart, but peaked at number 20 on the NZ Hot Singles Chart.)	— (Note: "Want To" did not enter the Swedish Singellista Chart, but peaked at number six on the Swedish Heatseeker Chart.)	—		Dua Lipa: Complete Edition
"Kiss and Make Up" (with Blackpink)	2018	36	33	— (Note: "Kiss and Make Up" did not enter the Ultratop 50 chart, but peaked at number four on the Ultratip chart.)	44	—	15	48	32	32	93	BPI: Gold; ARIA: Platinum; MC: Platinum; RMNZ: Platinum	Dua Lipa: Complete Edition
"High, Wild & Free"	2018	—	—	—	—	—	—	—	—	—	—		Non-album promotional single
"Future Nostalgia"	2019	— (Note: "Future Nostalgia" did not enter the UK Singles Chart but peaked at number 63 on the UK Singles Downloads Chart.)	99	—	—	—	83	—	— (Note: "Future Nostalgia" did not enter the NZ Top 40 Singles Chart, but peaked at number 11 on the NZ Hot Singles Chart.)	—	—	BPI: Silver; MC: Gold	Future Nostalgia
"Can They Hear Us"	2021	—	—	—	—	—	—	—	—	—	—		Gully
"Future Nostalgia Medley" (Live at the BRIT Awards 2021)	2021	—	—	—	—	—	—	—	—	—	—		Non-album promotional singles
"Think I'm in Love with You" (Live from the 59th ACM Awards) (with Chris Stapleton)	2024	—	—	—	—	—	—	—	—	—	—		Non-album promotional singles
"These Walls" (featuring Pierre de Maere)	2024	—	—	6	—	60	—	—	— (Note: "These Walls" featuring Pierre de Mare did not enter the NZ Top 40 Singles Chart, but peaked at number 36 on the NZ Hot Singles Chart.)	—	—	SNEP: Platinum	Non-album promotional singles
"Oye Mi Amor" (Live from Mexico) (featuring Fher of Maná)	2026	—	—	—	—	—	—	—	—	—	—		Live from Mexico
"Go Easy"	2026	—	—	—	—	—	—	—	—	—	—		Grand Theft Auto VI: The Album
"—" denotes a recording that did not chart or was not released in that country.

=== Charity singles ===
List of charity singles, with selected chart positions and certifications, showing year released and notes
Title	Year	Peak chart positions										Certifications	Notes
Title	Year	UK	AUS	AUT	BEL (FL) Tip	CAN DL	IRL	NZ Hot	SCO	SWI	US DL	Certifications	Notes
"Bridge over Troubled Water" (as part of Artists for Grenfell)	2017	1	53	32	26	—	25	— (Note: "Bridge over Troubled Water" did not enter the NZ Hot Singles Chart, but peaked at number four on the NZ Heatseeker Singles Chart.)	1	28	—	BPI: Gold	Released to raise money for victims of the Grenfell Tower fire.
"Times Like These" (as part of Live Lounge Allstars)	2020	1	—	—	39	8	64	5	1	—	18	BPI: Silver	Produced by BBC Radio 1 and released to aid international relief for the COVID-19 pandemic.
"—" denotes a recording that did not chart or was not released in that country.

== Other charted and certified songs ==
List of other charted and certified songs, with selected chart positions, certifications, showing album name and year released
Title	Year	Peak chart positions										Certifications	Album
Title	Year	UK	CAN	FRA	IRL	LTU	NZ Hot	POR	SVK	US Bub.	US Electro.	Certifications	Album
"High" (with Whethan)	2018	—	—	—	—	—	—	—	—	—	12		Fifty Shades Freed
"Cool"	2020	— (Note: "Cool" did not enter the UK Singles Chart but peaked at number 81 on the UK Singles Download Chart and number 60 on the Official Audio Streaming Chart.)	—	—	—	58	—	103	80	—	—	MC: Gold; RMNZ: Gold	Future Nostalgia
"Pretty Please"	2020	— (Note: "Pretty Please" did not enter the UK Singles Chart but peaked at number 70 on the Official Audio Streaming Chart.)	—	—	—	48	—	101	79	—	—	BPI: Silver; MC: Gold; RMNZ: Gold	Future Nostalgia
"Good in Bed"	2020	— (Note: "Good in Bed" did not enter the UK Singles Chart but peaked at number 91 on the Official Audio Streaming Chart.)	—	—	—	50	—	129	91	—	—		Future Nostalgia
"Boys Will Be Boys"	2020	—	—	—	—	78	—	148	—	—	—		Future Nostalgia
"Love Is Religion (The Blessed Madonna remix)"	2020	—	—	—	—	—	—	—	—	—	— (Note: "Love Is Religion" did not enter the Hot Dance/Electronic songs chart, but peaked at number 14 on the Dance/Electronic Digital Song Sales chart.)		Club Future Nostalgia
"If It Ain't Me"	2021	— (Note: "If It Ain't Me" did not enter the UK Singles Chart but peaked at number 73 on the UK Singles Download Chart.)	—	—	—	—	34	—	—	—	—		Future Nostalgia: The Moonlight Edition
"That Kind of Woman"	2021	— (Note: "That Kind of Woman" did not enter the UK Singles Chart but peaked at number 69 on the UK Singles Download Chart.)	—	—	—	—	—	—	—	—	21		Future Nostalgia: The Moonlight Edition
"These Walls"	2024	40	65	90	44	91	7	74	—	1	—	BPI: Silver; MC: Gold	Radical Optimism
"Whatcha Doing"	2024	—	—	150	—	—	12	—	—	—	—		Radical Optimism
"Falling Forever"	2024	—	—	177	—	—	14	177	—	—	12		Radical Optimism
"—" denotes a recording that did not chart or was not released in that country.

== Guest appearances ==
List of other appearances, showing year released, other artist(s) credited and album name
Title	Year	Other artist(s)	Album
"Go Easy"	2026	—N/a	Grand Theft Auto VI: The Album

== Music videos ==
List of music videos
Title	Year	Other artist(s)	Director(s)	Ref.
"New Love"	2015	None	Nicole Nodland	
"Be the One"	2015	None	Nicole Nodland	
"Last Dance"	2016	None	Jon Brewer; Ian Blair	
"Hotter than Hell"	2016	None	Emil Nava	
"Blow Your Mind (Mwah)"	2016	None	Kinga Burza	
"Room for 2"	2016	None	Vicky Lawton	
"Be the One"	2016	None	Daniel Kaufman	
"No Lie"	2017	Sean Paul	Tim Nackashi	
"Scared to Be Lonely"	2017	Martin Garrix	Blake Claridge	
"Thinking 'Bout You"	2017	None	Jake Jelicich	
"Lost in Your Light"	2017	Miguel	Henry Schofield	
"New Rules"	2017	None	Henry Schofield	
"My Love"	2017	Wale; Major Lazer; Wizkid	ACRS	
"IDGAF"	2018	None	Henry Schofield	
"One Kiss"	2018	Calvin Harris	Emil Nava	
"Electricity"	2018	Silk City	Bradley & Pablo	
"Want To"	2018	None	—N/a	—N/a
"If Only"	2018	Andrea Bocelli	Gaetano Morbioli	
"Swan Song"	2019	None	Floria Sigismondi	
"Don't Start Now"	2019	None	Nabil Elderkin	
"Physical"	2020	None	Canada	
"Break My Heart"	2020	None	Henry Scholfield	
"Hallucinate"	2020	None	Lisha Tan	
"Un Día (One Day)"	2020	J Balvin; Bad Bunny; Tainy	Stillz	
"Levitating (The Blessed Madonna remix)"	2020	Madonna; Missy Elliott; The Blessed Madonna	Will Hooper	
"Levitating"	2020	DaBaby	Warren Fu	
"Fever"	2020	Angèle	We are from L.A.	
"Prisoner"	2020	Miley Cyrus	Alana O'Herlihy; Miley Cyrus	
"We're Good"	2021	None	Vania Heymann; Gal Muggia	
"Love Again"	2021	None	Canada	
"Demeanor"	2021	Pop Smoke	Nabil Elderkin	
"Cold Heart (Pnau remix)"	2021	Elton John	Raman Djafari	
"Sweetest Pie"	2022	Megan Thee Stallion	Dave Meyers	
"Potion"	2022	Calvin Harris; Young Thug	Emil Nava	
"Dance The Night"	2023	None	Greta Gerwig	
"Houdini"	2023	None	Manu Cossu	
"Training Season"	2024	None	Vincent Haycock	
"Illusion"	2024	None	Tanu Muino	
"Handlebars"	2025	Jennie	BRTHR	

== See also ==
- List of songs recorded by Dua Lipa

== Notes ==
Notes for albums and songs

Notes for peak chart positions
