= Be the One (Dua Lipa song) =

2015 single by Dua Lipa

Single by Dua Lipa

from the album Dua Lipa
- B-side: "Last Dance"
- Released: 30 October 2015
- Recorded: 2015
- Studio: Sony/ATV Studios (Note: The location of Sony/ATV Studios is not indicated in the liner notes of Dua Lipa.); TaP/Strongroom 7, London, UK
- Genre: Dream pop; Europop; synth-pop
- Length: 3:22
- Label: Dua Lipa Limited
- Songwriters: Lucy Taylor; Nick Gale; Jack Tarrant
- Producer: Digital Farm Animals

Dua Lipa singles chronology
"New Love" (2015)	"Be the One" (2015)	"Last Dance" (2016)

Music videos
- "Be the One" on YouTube; "Be the One" (2016) on YouTube

"Be the One" is a song recorded by English singer Dua Lipa for her eponymous debut studio album (2017). The song was written by Lucy Taylor, Jack Tarrant and Digital Farm Animals, with the latter of the three also handling the production. They wrote it about a relationship that Taylor was in and gave the song to Lipa, who was originally reluctant to record it due to the writing credits. It is a dream pop, Europop and synth-pop song with elements of gospel and power pop. Lyrically, it sees Lipa begging her boyfriend for a romantic redemption. The song received acclaim from music critics, with many hailing it as a standout on the album and praising the anthemic qualities in the production.

Released through Dua Lipa Limited for digital download and streaming on 30 October 2015, "Be the One" received limited attention at the time as it was only intended to be promoted on blogs and online outlets. However, after being picked up by German radio stations, it became a sleeper hit the following year. Due to this success, the song was re-released on 6 December 2016, being promoted in the United Kingdom and the United States. It reached the top ten of charts in nine territories worldwide, including the Flanders region of Belgium where it reached the summit and Lipa's native region of the United Kingdom, where it peaked at number nine becoming her first solo top 10 single. The song is currently certified gold or higher in eleven regions, including a double platinum in the UK.

The music video for "Be the One" was directed by Nicole Nodland. It features several scenes of Lipa in London. With the song's re-release, a second music video was released. Directed by Daniel Kaufman, it stars Ansel Elgort as Lipa's love interest and was created in a collaboration between Vevo and Lexus, where a Lexus IS covered in LEDs appears. The video features Elgort following Lipa out of a motel after the two had an argument. Lipa promoted the song with numerous live performances, including ones for Jimmy Kimmel Live!, Good Morning America, and Later... with Jools Holland. Remixes by Paul Woolford, Take a Daytrip and Netsky were also released for promotion.

== Background and composition ==
"Be the One" was written by Lucy Taylor, Digital Farm Animals and Jack Tarrant. They wrote it about the miscommunication in a relationship Taylor was in at the time. A good friend of Dua Lipa's, Taylor played the song for her and offered her to record it, prior to Lipa releasing any music. Lipa immediately fell in love with the song, specifically citing the melodies and "persistent" lyrics as why; she thought it would be a perfect fit on her album. However, she was reluctant to record the song due to the fact that she did not write it.

Following much pressure from her management and after she sang it once and realized how fun it was to sing, Lipa formed a personal connection to it, which she described as "different" than that to ones she has written due to the fact that when performing a song, she reminisces about having written it. Lipa then went into the studio with Taylor and Digital Farm Animals to complete the song. Lipa recalled having a fun time with them and felt as though she made the song her own. The song was recorded by Evelyn Yard at Sony/ATV Recording Studios while Lipa's vocals were recorded at TaP Studio / Strongroom 7 in London. The mixing was done by Serban Ghenea at MixStar Studios in Virginia Beach, Virginia while John Davis mastered the song at Metropolis Studios in London. "Be the One" is one of the two songs on Lipa's self-titled debut studio album that Lipa does not have a writing credit on, with the other being "New Rules".

Musically, "Be the One" is a soulful, dream pop, Europop and synth-pop song, with gospel and power pop elements. Constructed in verse–chorus form, the song runs for 3 minutes and 22 seconds and is composed in 4/4 time and the key of F mixolydian, with a tempo of 176 beats per minute and a chord progression of F–E♭6–E♭maj7. It has an airy production, containing a tropical R&B beat, 1980s grooves, electropop riffs, layered melodies, a programmed drum loop, calypso synths, handclaps, a vinyl hiss, and a guitar arpeggio. Lipa uses sensuous alto vocals, spanning a range of F_{3} to D_{5}. Described by Lipa as about "self belief, perseverance, and fighting for what you want," the song sees her pleading for a romantic redemption after a falling out with her boyfriend.

== Release and promotion ==
"Be the One" was first announced by Lipa during an interview with Nylon in October 2015. The song was released for digital download and streaming on 30 October 2015 through the singer's independent record label Dua Lipa Limited. Discussing releasing the single, Lipa admitted that she lacked excitement due to the writing credits. A "Bedtime Mix" was made available on 5 January 2016 to Phil Taggart for airplay on BBC Radio 1. The song was sent for radio airplay in Italy on 29 January 2016. The same day, an extended play including a dark trap remix of the song by Shy Luv, as well as remixes by Dillistone, Paul Woolford, Take a Daytrip, Ten Ven and With You was released; They were sent for radio airplay in Italy on 9 February 2016. An extended play for the song was released on 19 February 2016, exclusively in Austria, Germany and Switzerland. It featured Lipa's singles "New Love" (2015) and "Last Dance" (2016), as well as the "Be the One" remix by With You and a Max + Johann remix of the song. The first music video for "Be the One" and the "Last Dance" music video are also included.

In Germany, a CD single with "Last Dance" as its B-side was released on 11 March 2016. Universal Music Germany held a contest for fans to win signed versions of the CD, only three of which were available. A live version of "Be the One" appears as the fourth track on Lipa's extended play Spotify Sessions, released 8 July 2016. After finding commercial success, "Be the One" was re-released on 6 December 2016 in the United Kingdom. In the United States, the song was promoted to contemporary hit radio formats as a promotional single on 22 February 2017, before officially impacting the format on 21 March 2017, becoming the album's second single in the US following "Blow Your Mind (Mwah)" (2016). With the re-release, a remix by Netsky on 24 February 2017. The remix is a "blissful and laid back" drum and bass track with daydream vibes. It uses the song's original arrangement with a "pounding" percussion and synths. "Be the One" is included on Lipa's 21 April 2017-released, Urban Outfitters-exclusive vinyl extended play The Only, serving as the fourth track on the EP. The song also appears as the fourth track on Lipa's eponymous debut studio album, released on 2 June 2017 and serving as the album's second single. Lipa revealed that the song was never intended to be promoted to radio, only to blogs and online outlets.

== Critical reception ==
"Be the One" was met with acclaim from music critics. In The Guardian, Paul Lester called the song "fabulous" while comparing Lipa's "smoky" vocals to that of Lana Del Rey's "younger, poppier" style. Claire Biddles of The Line of Best Fit named it a standout on Dua Lipa and compared it to Shura, while she also called the song "gorgeous enough to warrant a reappraisal [in 2017]." In a separate review for the same magazine, Paul Bridgewater labelled it a "fresh breath of pop air." Writing for musicOMH, Ben Hogwood called the song "utterly beguiling," praising the production and also stating that it is "arguably her best song to date." For DIY, Jamie Milton described the song as "a sweet club track given pop takeover potential," as well as comparing it to Justin Bieber's My World 2.0 (2010).

Alim Kheraj, also of DIY, stated that the song has an "airy wistfulness," while he also viewed it as "transcendent" and a "euphoria." Carl Williott of Idolator called the track "bouncier and catchier" than Lipa's "New Love". For The Fader, Jeff Ihaza branded the song "blissful." In a review for Clash, Alex Green stated that "Be the One" "sparkles" with the "zeal" that "Hotter than Hell" (2016) misses. Richard Jones, in a separate Clash review, called the song a "dark and seductive anthem." In the Evening Standard, Rick Pearson labelled its chorus "irresistible." Sean Ward of The 405 called the song a standout on Dua Lipa, categorizing the chorus as "rushing" and lyrical structure as "sophisticated," as well as comparing the song to Body Talk by Robyn.

Nylon's Laura Studarus described the song as "perfect club music," while also calling its hooks "sticky" and melodies "moody." For Vice, Alexandra Hayward branded the song "glossily" and "anthemic" as well as commenting on the "desperation" of Lipa's vocals. The staff at The Singles Jukebox gave the song an average of 6.83. Crystal Leww praised the production but criticized its meaning, writing that the song does not "make sense," while Thomas Inskeep praised Lipa's vocals for being "rich" and "luscious." Popjustice ranked "Be the One" at number 44 on their 2015 year-end list for best songs of the year. In April 2020, Glamour's Christopher Rosa ranked "Be the One" as Lipa's third best song, calling it "ethereal" and comparing the song to the music of Florence and the Machine.

== Commercial performance ==
After its release in October 2015, "Be the One" failed to chart and received little airplay. However, it became a sleeper hit the following year after being picked up by radio stations in Germany, and later, across the rest of Europe. The song debuted at number 77 in Germany on the chart dated 25 December 2015. It spent a total of 28 weeks on the chart and reached a peak of number 11 in its eighth week. The song was awarded a platinum certification in the country from the Bundesverband Musikindustrie (BVMI) for track-equivalent sales of 400,000 units. In Belgium, "Be the One" reached number 42 in the Wallonia region, however, it performed significantly better in the Flanders region. In 2015, the song spent five weeks on the Ultratip Flanders chart, before entering the Ultratop 50 chart at number 43, dated 23 January 2016. In its ninth week, the song rose to the chart's summit and lasted for 13 weeks following. In 2017, it was awarded a platinum certification by the Belgian Entertainment Association (BEA) for 30,000 track-equivalent unit sales.

"Be the One" peaked at number seven on the Euro Digital Song Sales chart, and reached number seven in Austria, three in Hungary, two in Slovenia, one in Poland and four in Scotland. Additionally, the song holds a double platinum certification in Italy and a diamond certification Poland. The song reached number 11 in the Netherlands and was given a double platinum certification in the country for selling 60,000 track-equivalent units. In Australia, "Be the One" debuted at number 46 on the ARIA Singles Chart dated 3 April 2016, becoming her first entry on the chart. In its fifth week, the song rose to a peak of number six and spent a total of 18 weeks on the chart. That year, it was awarded a double platinum certification from the Australian Recording Industry Association (ARIA) for 140,000 track-equivalent sales in the country. In New Zealand, the song sold 90,000 track-equivalent units, resulting in it being awarded 3× Platinum certification from Recorded Music NZ (RMNZ). It spent seven weeks on their singles chart, reaching a peak of number 20.

"Be the One" debuted at number 70 on the UK Singles Downloads Chart dated 13 January 2017. The following week, the song entered the UK Singles Chart at number 54, becoming Lipa's fourth entry on the chart. It peaked at number nine on the chart issue dated 17 February 2017, becoming Lipa's highest-charting single for that occasion as well as her first solo top 10 single. The song lasted for 25 weeks on the chart. In October 2025, it received a triple platinum certification by the British Phonographic Industry (BPI) for sales of 1,800,000 track-equivalent units in the United Kingdom. In the United States, the song reached number 40 on the Mainstream Top 40 chart and the summit of the Dance Club Songs chart. For track-equivalent sales of 500,000 units, the Recording Industry Association of America awarded the song a gold certification. The song also has that certification from Music Canada for 40,000 track-equivalent unit sales.

== Music videos ==
=== Version 1 ===
The first music video for "Be the One" was filmed in London and showcases some of Lipa's favourite spots in the city.

The music video for "Be the One" was directed by Nicole Nodland, who was also director of the video for "New Love". Following the recording of the video for "New Love" in Los Angeles, Lipa recalled having lots of fun and decided to attempt to re-create it with the music video for "Be the One", except in London. The singer stated that the video had no concept. Filming it, they went around to some of Lipa's favourite places in London, as well as exploring Soho, playing dress-up and dancing. Lipa cited 1990s fashion and vintage clothing as her inspirations for the visual. Nodland also produced it, while editing and cinematography was handled by Jackson Ducasse. The visual premiered through Nylon on 29 October 2015.

The video showcases several different colour effects. In an abandoned room, Lipa wears a black outfit and sings while sitting on a white chair. At some points she gets down to her knees and walks around the space. She is also seen laying in a field wearing a pink fur coat and glasses. In other scenes, she rides a limo with her head out the sun roof, roams the streets of Soho and sings in front of dark, white and rose backgrounds. Writing for Nylon, Sydney Gore praised the video's wardrobe. Ihaza wrote the music video "skips the melancholy, though, instead opting to dance in the face of vulnerability, and who wouldn't." Courtney Buck of The 405 stated that the video complements the song "seamlessly."

=== Version 2 ===
Ansel Elgort follows Lipa to a Lexus IS car in the second video for "Be the One"

The second music video for "Be the One" was released through Vevo on 5 December 2016, in promotion of the song's re-release. It was directed by Daniel Kaufman and stars Ansel Elgort as Lipa's love interest. The video was made as a collaboration between Lexus and Vevo, and features a Lexus IS wrapped in 41,999 LEDs, which generates visuals based on the song. It was created after Lipa noticed fans asking her on social media for a second video to be shot. With it, Lipa wanted to show the darker side of the song, showing its themes of miscommunication in a relationship. The video begins with Lipa and Elgort having an argument in a neon-lit motel room, followed by Lipa storming out while Elgort follows. Elgort follows Lipa down an empty motorway, where flashback scenes are shown. The video concludes with Elgort catching up to Lipa, where she eventually escapes in the Lexus IS. For V, William Defebaugh named the music video "futuristic".

== Live performances ==
Lipa delivered her first live performance of "Be the One" at the BBC's Sound of... ceremony on 8 January 2016. Five days later, she performed it at the Eurosonic festival for that year. It was also included on the set lists of both Lipa's Hotter than Hell Tour and the Self-Titled Tour. On 29 January 2016, Lipa performed the song for BBC Radio 1's Live Lounge. She performed the song at the Glastonbury Festival in 2016 and 2017. In 2017, Lipa performed "Be the One" at the Brit Awards for the Critics' Choice Award, EBBA Awards, and the NME Awards. Also in 2017, Lipa performed the song during Capital FM's Summertime Ball and Jingle Bell Ball, at The O2 Arena. That same year, in the US, Lipa performed the song on iHeartRadio, Jimmy Kimmel Live!, and Good Morning America. The song was part of Lipa's setlists for 2017s BBC Radio 1's Big Weekend as well as Bonnaroo, and 2018s Tomorrowland. On 31 October 2017, she performed it on Later... with Jools Holland. On 16 November 2018, Lipa performed the song at the Bambi Awards. 2018 UEFA Champions League Final in Kyiv, Ukraine. "Be the One" was also included in the setlist for Lipa's 2022 Future Nostalgia Tour.

== Track listings ==
- Digital download and streaming
1. "Be the One" – 3:22
- Digital EP – remixes
1. "Be the One" (Shy Luv remix) – 3:28
2. "Be the One" (Dillistone remix) – 3:47
3. "Be the One" (Paul Woolford remix) – 6:21
4. "Be the One" (Take a Daytrip remix) – 4:08
5. "Be the One" (Ten Ven remix) – 5:24
6. "Be the One" (With You remix) – 5:45
- Digital download and streaming – Netsky remix
1. "Be the One" (Netsky remix) – 4:17
- Digital EP
1. "Be the One" – 3:23
2. "New Love" – 3:59
3. "Last Dance" – 3:49
4. "Be the One" (With You remix) – 5:45
5. "Be the One" (Max + Johann Remix) – 4:06
6. "Be the One" (music video) – 3:25
7. "Last Dance" (music video) – 3:48
- CD single
1. "Be the One" – 3:22
2. "Last Dance" – 3:49

== Personnel ==
- Dua Lipa – lead vocals, backing vocals
- Digital Farm Animals – production
- Lucy Taylor – backing vocals
- Jack Tarrant – vocal production, guitar
- Evelyn Yard – recording
- John Hanes – engineering for mix
- Serban Ghenea – mixing
- John Davis – mastering

== Charts ==
=== Weekly charts ===
Weekly chart performance for "Be the One"
Chart (2015–2017)	Peak position
Argentina (Monitor Latino)	5
Australia (ARIA)	6
Austria (Ö3 Austria Top 40)	7
Belgium (Ultratop 50 Flanders)	1
Belgium (Ultratop 50 Wallonia)	42
CIS Airplay (TopHit)	118
Croatia International Airplay (HRT)	3
Czech Republic Airplay (ČNS IFPI)	12
Czech Republic Singles Digital (ČNS IFPI)	50
Euro Digital Song Sales (Billboard)	7
Finland Airplay (Radiosoittolista)	55
France (SNEP)	42
Germany (GfK)	11
Greece Digital Songs (Billboard)	9
Hungary (Rádiós Top 40)	5
Hungary (Single Top 40)	3
Ireland (IRMA)	25
Italy (FIMI)	28
Luxembourg Digital Song Sales (Billboard)	8
Mexico (Billboard Ingles Airplay)	13
Netherlands (Dutch Top 40)	5
Netherlands (Single Top 100)	11
New Zealand (Recorded Music NZ)	20
Poland Airplay (ZPAV)	1
Portugal (AFP)	70
Romania (Airplay 100)	13
Scottish Singles Sales (Official Charts)	4
Slovakia Airplay (ČNS IFPI)	1
Slovakia Singles Digital (ČNS IFPI)	35
Slovenia (SloTop50)	2
Spain (Promusicae)	20
Sweden (Sverigetopplistan)	100
Switzerland (Schweizer Hitparade)	11
UK Singles (Official Charts)	9
US Dance Club Songs (Billboard)	1
US Pop Airplay (Billboard)	40

=== Year-end charts ===
2016 year-end chart performance for "Be the One"
Chart (2016)	Position
Australia (ARIA)	52
Austria (Ö3 Austria Top 40)	53
Belgium (Ultratop 50 Flanders)	10
Germany (Official German Charts)	72
Hungary (Rádiós Top 40)	12
Hungary (Single Top 40)	18
Italy (FIMI)	80
Netherlands (Dutch Top 40)	27
Netherlands (Single Top 100)	50
Poland (Polish Airplay Top 100)	3
Slovenia (SloTop50)	15
Switzerland (Schweizer Hitparade)	51

2017 year-end chart performance for "Be the One"
Chart (2017)	Position
UK Singles (OCC)	50
US Dance Club Songs (Billboard)	2

== Certifications ==
Certifications and sales for "Be the One"
Region	Certification	Certified units/sales
Australia (ARIA)	2× Platinum	140,000^{‡}
Belgium (BRMA)	Platinum	20,000^{‡}
Canada (Music Canada)	Platinum	80,000^{‡}
Denmark (IFPI Danmark)	Platinum	90,000^{‡}
Germany (BVMI)	Platinum	400,000^{‡}
Italy (FIMI)	2× Platinum	100,000^{‡}
Netherlands (NVPI)	2× Platinum	60,000^{‡}
New Zealand (RMNZ)	4× Platinum	120,000^{‡}
Poland (ZPAV)	Diamond	250,000^{‡}
Portugal (AFP)	Platinum	20,000^{‡}
Spain (Promusicae)	Platinum	60,000^{‡}
Sweden (GLF)	Gold	20,000^{‡}
United Kingdom (BPI)	3× Platinum	1,800,000^{‡}
United States (RIAA)	Gold	500,000^{‡}
^{‡} Sales+streaming figures based on certification alone.

== Release history ==
Release dates and formats for "Be the One"
Region	Date	Format(s)	Version	Label(s)	Ref.
Various	30 October 2015	Digital download; streaming	Original	Dua Lipa Limited	
Various	29 January 2016	Digital download; streaming	Remixes EP	Dua Lipa Limited	
Italy	29 January 2016	Radio airplay	Original	Warner Bros.	
Italy	9 February 2016	Radio airplay	Remixes	Warner Bros.	
Austria	19 February 2016	Digital download; streaming	EP	Vertigo; Capitol	
Germany	19 February 2016	Digital download; streaming	EP	Vertigo; Capitol	
Switzerland	19 February 2016	Digital download; streaming	EP	Vertigo; Capitol	
Germany	11 March 2016	CD single	Original	Vertigo	
United Kingdom	6 December 2016 (Note: Reissue)	Digital download; streaming	Original	Dua Lipa Limited	
United States	22 February 2017 (Note: Release as a promotional single)	Contemporary hit radio	Original	Warner Bros.	
Various	24 February 2017	Digital download; streaming	Netsky remix	Dua Lipa Limited	
United States	21 March 2017	Contemporary hit radio	Original	Warner Bros.	

== See also ==
- List of Live Lounge cover versions
- List of interpolated songs
- List of Platinum singles in the United Kingdom awarded since 2000
- List of Ultratop 50 number-one singles of 2016
- List of number-one singles of 2016 (Poland)
- List of Billboard Dance Club Songs number ones of 2017
- List of UK top-ten singles in 2017
- List of top 10 singles in 2016 (Australia)
