= List of Billboard number-one dance songs of 2017 =

Billboard magazine compiled the top-performing dance songs in the United States during 2017 on the Hot Dance/Electronic Songs, the Dance Club Songs, and the Dance/Mix Show Airplay. The oldest dance music chart, the Dance Club Songs was first published in 1976, ranking the most popular songs on dance club based on reports from a national sample of club DJs. The Dance/Mix Show Airplay was launched in 2003, ranking songs based on airplay detections on dance radio, as well as mix-show plays on top 40 radio and select rhythmic radio as measured by Mediabase. Premiered on January 26, 2013, the Hot Dance/Electronic Songs is a multi-metric chart ranking songs based on streaming, sales, and airplay audience impressions from radio stations of all formats.

== Chart history ==
Key
†	Indicates top-performing dance song of 2017.

Chart history
Issue date	Hot Dance/Electronic Songs			Dance Club Songs			Dance/Mix Show Airplay		
Issue date	Song	Artist(s)	Ref.	Song	Artist(s)	Ref.	Song	Artist(s)	Ref.
January 7	"Closer"	The Chainsmokers featuring Halsey		"Older"	Lodato featuring Joseph Duveen		"Closer"	The Chainsmokers featuring Halsey	
January 14	"Closer"	The Chainsmokers featuring Halsey		"Blow Your Mind (Mwah)"	Dua Lipa		"Closer"	The Chainsmokers featuring Halsey	
January 21	"Closer"	The Chainsmokers featuring Halsey		"Love on the Brain"	Rihanna		"Closer"	The Chainsmokers featuring Halsey	
January 28	"Closer"	The Chainsmokers featuring Halsey		"Hell in Paradise 2016"	Ono		"Scars to Your Beautiful"	Alessia Cara	
February 4	"Closer"	The Chainsmokers featuring Halsey		"Nothing to Lose"	Vassy		"Scars to Your Beautiful"	Alessia Cara	
February 11	"Closer"	The Chainsmokers featuring Halsey		"Move Your Body"	Sia		"Scars to Your Beautiful"	Alessia Cara	
February 18	"Closer"	The Chainsmokers featuring Halsey		"Distortion"	J Sutta		"Rockabye"	Clean Bandit featuring Sean Paul and Anne-Marie	
February 25	"Closer"	The Chainsmokers featuring Halsey		"Yeah Yeah 2017"	Luciana and Dave Audé		"Paris"	The Chainsmokers	
March 4	"Closer"	The Chainsmokers featuring Halsey		"Long Live Love"	LeAnn Rimes		"Shape of You"†	Ed Sheeran	
March 11	"Paris"	The Chainsmokers		"Slumber Party"	Britney Spears featuring Tinashe		"Paris"	The Chainsmokers	
March 18	"Something Just like This" †	The Chainsmokers and Coldplay		"Shape of You"†	Ed Sheeran		"Shape of You" †	Ed Sheeran	
March 25	"Paris"	The Chainsmokers		"Shape of You"†	Ed Sheeran		"Paris"	The Chainsmokers	
April 1	"Something Just like This" †	The Chainsmokers and Coldplay		"I Got You"	Bebe Rexha		"Shape of You" †	Ed Sheeran	
April 8	"Something Just like This" †	The Chainsmokers and Coldplay		"Sex with Me"	Rihanna		"Paris"	The Chainsmokers	
April 15	"Something Just like This" †	The Chainsmokers and Coldplay		"Lick Me Up"	Tony Moran and Dani Toro featuring Zhana Roiya		"Paris"	The Chainsmokers	
April 22	"Something Just like This" †	The Chainsmokers and Coldplay		"Chained to the Rhythm"	Katy Perry featuring Skip Marley		"Shape of You" †	Ed Sheeran	
April 29	"Something Just like This" †	The Chainsmokers and Coldplay		"Hey Baby"	Dimitri Vegas & Like Mike vs. Diplo featuring Deb's Daughter		"Shape of You" †	Ed Sheeran	
May 6	"Stay"	Zedd and Alessia Cara		"Places"	Xenia Ghali featuring Raquel Castro		"Shape of You" †	Ed Sheeran	
May 13	"Something Just like This" †	The Chainsmokers and Coldplay		"Fun"	Blondie		"Something Just Like This"	The Chainsmokers and Coldplay	
May 20	"Something Just like This" †	The Chainsmokers and Coldplay		"Find Me"	Sigma featuring Birdy		"Something Just Like This"	The Chainsmokers and Coldplay	
May 27	"Something Just like This" †	The Chainsmokers and Coldplay		"I Love You"	Axwell and Ingrosso featuring Kid Ink		"Something Just Like This"	The Chainsmokers and Coldplay	
June 3	"Something Just like This" †	The Chainsmokers and Coldplay		"Anthem of House"	Rosabel featuring Terri B!		"Something Just Like This"	The Chainsmokers and Coldplay	
June 10	"Stay"	Zedd and Alessia Cara		"Lady"	Austin Mahone featuring Pitbull		"Something Just Like This"	The Chainsmokers and Coldplay	
June 17	"Stay"	Zedd and Alessia Cara		"You're Not Alone"	Scotty Boy and Lizzie Curious		"Something Just Like This"	The Chainsmokers and Coldplay	
June 24	"Something Just like This" †	The Chainsmokers and Coldplay		"Be the One"	Dua Lipa		"Something Just Like This"	The Chainsmokers and Coldplay	
July 1	"Something Just like This" †	The Chainsmokers and Coldplay		"Symphony"	Clean Bandit featuring Zara Larsson		"Stay"	Zedd and Alessia Cara	
July 8	"Something Just like This" †	The Chainsmokers and Coldplay		"Ghosting"	Joe Bermudez featuring Megn		"Stay"	Zedd and Alessia Cara	
July 15	"Something Just like This" †	The Chainsmokers and Coldplay		"Pose"	Rihanna		"Despacito"	Luis Fonsi and Daddy Yankee featuring Justin Bieber	
July 22	"Stay"	Zedd and Alessia Cara		"Swish Swish"	Katy Perry featuring Nicki Minaj		"Despacito"	Luis Fonsi and Daddy Yankee featuring Justin Bieber	
July 29	"Stay"	Zedd and Alessia Cara		"My Fire"	Nile Rodgers and Tony Moran present Kimberly Davis		"Despacito"	Luis Fonsi and Daddy Yankee featuring Justin Bieber	
August 5	"Stay"	Zedd and Alessia Cara		"Love Is Love Is Love"	LeAnn Rimes		"Despacito"	Luis Fonsi and Daddy Yankee featuring Justin Bieber	
August 12	"Stay"	Zedd and Alessia Cara		"Malibu"	Miley Cyrus		"Despacito"	Luis Fonsi and Daddy Yankee featuring Justin Bieber	
August 19	"Something Just like This" †	The Chainsmokers and Coldplay		"Gltchlfe"	Taryn Manning		"Despacito"	Luis Fonsi and Daddy Yankee featuring Justin Bieber	
August 26	"Something Just like This" †	The Chainsmokers and Coldplay		"Wild Thoughts"	DJ Khaled featuring Rihanna and Bryson Tiller		"Despacito"	Luis Fonsi and Daddy Yankee featuring Justin Bieber	
September 2	"Something Just like This" †	The Chainsmokers and Coldplay		"Only Want You"	Skylar Stecker		"Attention"	Charlie Puth	
September 9	"Feels"	Calvin Harris featuring Pharrell Williams, Katy Perry and Big Sean		"Your Song"	Rita Ora		"Attention"	Charlie Puth	
September 16	"Feels"	Calvin Harris featuring Pharrell Williams, Katy Perry and Big Sean		"Let the World Be Ours Tonight"	Deborah Cox		"Attention"	Charlie Puth	
September 23	"Feels"	Calvin Harris featuring Pharrell Williams, Katy Perry and Big Sean		"OK"	Robin Schulz featuring James Blunt		"Attention"	Charlie Puth	
September 30	"Something Just like This" †	The Chainsmokers and Coldplay		"Creatures of the Night"	Hardwell and Austin Mahone		"Attention"	Charlie Puth	
October 7	"Something Just like This" †	The Chainsmokers and Coldplay		"Testify!"	HiFi Sean featuring Crystal Waters		"Attention"	Charlie Puth	
October 14	"Something Just like This" †	The Chainsmokers and Coldplay		"Desperado"	Rihanna		"Attention"	Charlie Puth	
October 21	"Something Just like This" †	The Chainsmokers and Coldplay		"Slow Hands"	Niall Horan		"Attention"	Charlie Puth	
October 28	"Something Just like This" †	The Chainsmokers and Coldplay		"What About Us"	Pink		"Attention"	Charlie Puth	
November 4	"Something Just like This" †	The Chainsmokers and Coldplay		"New Rules"	Dua Lipa		"Strip That Down"	Liam Payne featuring Quavo	
November 11	"Something Just like This" †	The Chainsmokers and Coldplay		"Cola"	CamelPhat and Elderbrook		"Feel It Still"	Portugal. The Man	
November 18	"Wolves"	Selena Gomez and Marshmello		"Love So Soft"	Kelly Clarkson		"Feel It Still"	Portugal. The Man	
November 25	"Something Just like This" †	The Chainsmokers and Coldplay		"Silence"	Marshmello featuring Khalid		"Feel It Still"	Portugal. The Man	
December 2	"Silence"	Marshmello featuring Khalid		"Disco Tits"	Tove Lo		"Feel It Still"	Portugal. The Man	
December 9	"Wolves"	Selena Gomez and Marshmello		"Waving Through a Window"	Ben Platt & Original Broadway Cast Of Dear Evan Hansen		"Feel It Still"	Portugal. The Man	
December 16	"Wolves"	Selena Gomez and Marshmello		"Bad at Love"	Halsey		"Silence"	Marshmello featuring Khalid	
December 23	"Wolves"	Selena Gomez and Marshmello		"Woman"	Kesha		"Havana"	Camila Cabello featuring Young Thug	
December 30	"Wolves"	Selena Gomez and Marshmello		"Complicated"	Dimitri Vegas & Like Mike and David Guetta, featuring Kiiara		"Havana"	Camila Cabello featuring Young Thug	
