= Love on the Brain =

2016 song by Rihanna

Single by Rihanna

from the album Anti
- Written: November 2013
- Released: 27 September 2016
- Recorded: 2015
- Studio: Westlake Recording Studios (Hollywood, CA)
- Genre: Doo-wop; soul
- Length: 3:44
- Label: Westbury Road; Roc Nation
- Songwriters: Fred Ball; Joseph Angel; Robyn Fenty
- Producer: Fred Ball

Rihanna singles chronology
"Too Good" (2016)	"Love on the Brain" (2016)	"Selfish" (2017)

Audio video
- "Love on the Brain" on YouTube

"Love on the Brain" is a song by the Barbadian singer Rihanna. It was released on 27 September 2016 by Westbury Road and Roc Nation as the fourth single from her eighth album, Anti (2016). Written by Joseph Angel and producer Fred Ball, "Love on the Brain" is a 1950s-and-1960s-inspired doo-wop and soul ballad. The production incorporates an orchestra consisting of guitar arpeggio, organ, and syncopated strings. The lyrics are about the highs and lows of a toxic love.

"Love on the Brain" reached number one on the Polish Singles Chart, as well as the top-twenty in France and New Zealand, and top-forty in Austria, Canada, and Germany. The song reached number five on the US Billboard Hot 100 chart; it became Rihanna's 22nd top-five single breaking her tie with Elvis Presley as the artist with the 5th most top-five singles, and it was also her 30th top-ten single. It was certified Diamond by the Recording Industry Association of America (RIAA), reaching Diamond status in France and Poland as well. Rihanna performed the track during her Anti World Tour, as well as at the 2016 Billboard Music Awards and the 2016 MTV Video Music Awards. "Love on the Brain" was covered by various artists including Kelly Clarkson, MGK, Ava Max, Little Mix and S'22kile from Idols SA season 17.

== Background and release ==
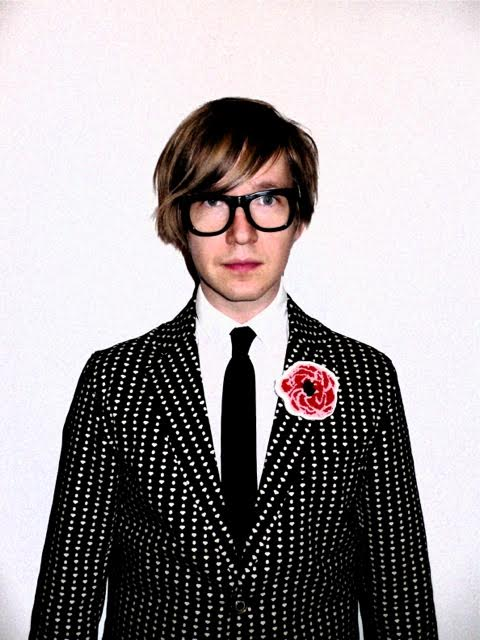
Norwegian producer Fred Ball co-wrote and produced the song.

"Love on the Brain" was the first song commissioned for Rihanna's album Anti. Written by Norwegian songwriter and producer Fred Ball, American songwriter Joseph Angel and Rihanna in late 2013, inspiration for the song came from Prince and Al Green. Ball recalled, "We wanted it to have that juxtaposition of an old school soul feel with modern lyrics. That's why Amy Winehouse was never pastiche or retro even though her music has an old soul sound." Rihanna worked closely alongside Ball and Angel throughout the writing process, contributing lyrics and creative direction as a lead songwriter to help shape the song’s final sound and identity.

American producer Kuk Harrell handled the song's vocal production. Ball and Angel also supplied the song's keyboards and drums. "Love on the Brain" was recorded at Westlake Studios in Los Angeles. The vocal recording was carried out by Marcos Tovar for Allfadersup and Harrell. The song was finally mixed by Manny Marroquin at Larrabee Studios in North Hollywood, along with mixing assistants Chris Galland, Jeff Jackson and Ike Schultz, before being mastered by Chris Gehringer at Sterling Sound, in New York City.

"Love on the Brain" was first announced as a recorded track in 2015, and was to be debuted at the 2015 Brit Awards, however Rihanna allegedly pulled out. In early August 2016, Philadelphia radio personality Mike Adam stated that "Love on the Brain" would be the album's fourth single, later confirmed by Rihanna herself on 21 August 2016. It was sent to rhythmic contemporary and urban contemporary radios on 27 September, impacted contemporary hit radio on 11 October, and the hot adult contemporary stations on 14 November. (Note: "Love on the Brain" was originally scheduled to be released to hot adult contemporary radios on 10 October 2016, but it was postponed to 14 November.)

== Composition and lyrical interpretation ==
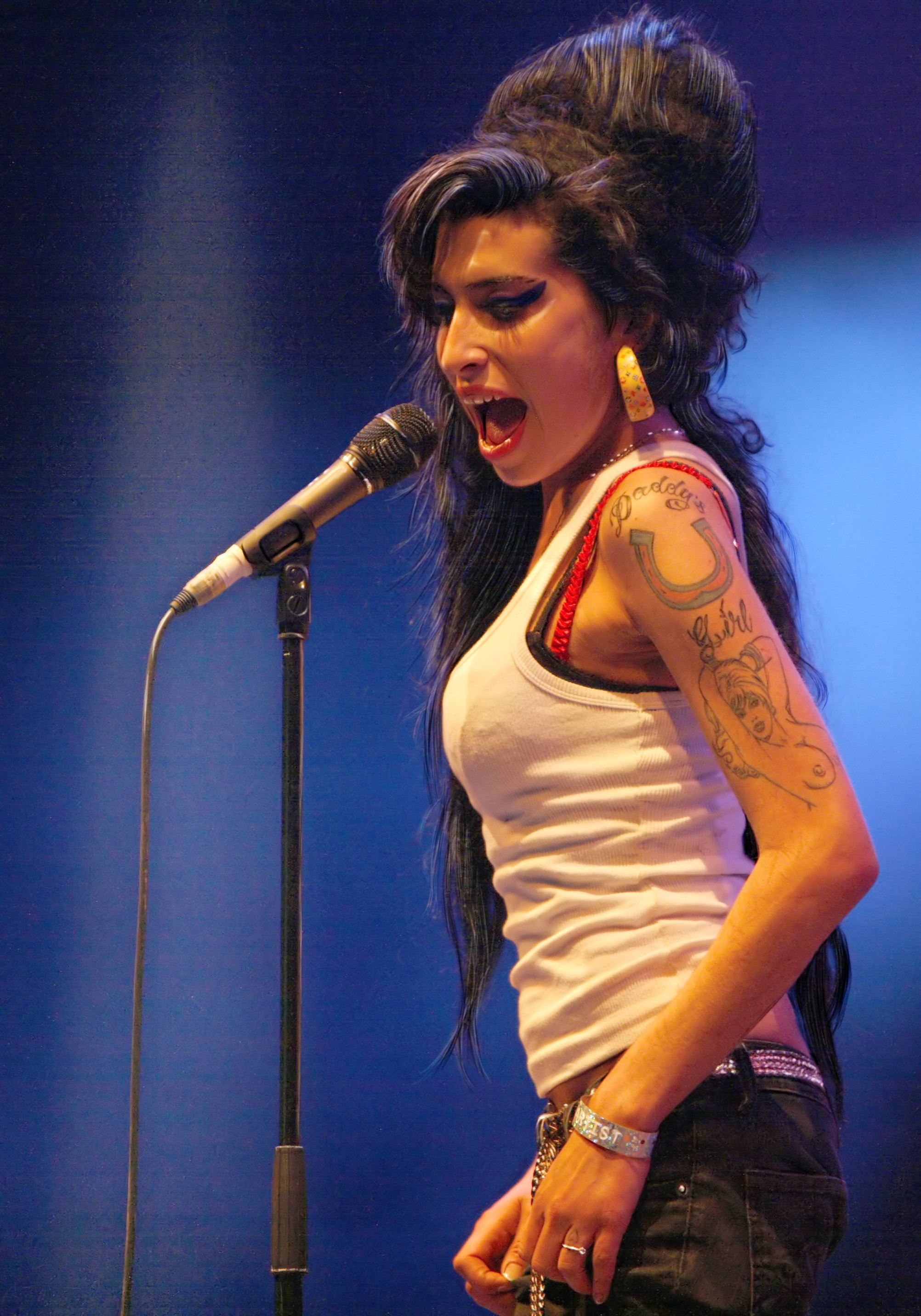
According to some reviewers, Rihanna channels Amy Winehouse (pictured) on the track.

"Love on the Brain" is a mid-tempo '50s and '60s inspired doo-wop and soul ballad, with a "rock edge". Its instrumentation consists of a "guitar arpeggio," "swirling organ", a "simple chord progression", syncopated strings, and "a wave of an orchestra". Written in the key of G major, it has a tempo of 57 beats per minute in compound quadruple (12/8) time. The song follows a chord progression of G–Am–Em–D, and Rihanna's vocals span from D_{3} to G_{5}.

Rihanna's vocals were noted as being acrobatic ranging from her "trademark snarl", to high notes, complemented by all-tenor backing vocals. Forrest Wickman of Slate magazine commented that the song "seems designed as a showcase for Rihanna’s vocal versatility: She starts out singing high and sweet, then drops into her chest to show off the lower part of her range and finally gets into powerful belting. She even does a few seconds of what sounds like Frankie Valli's falsetto." Jordan Bassett of NME compared her high notes to those of Mariah Carey, while Vibe magazine and USA Today noted similarities with the work of Erykah Badu. Amy Winehouse, Etta James and Sam Cooke were also perceived as influences by critics, with Michigan Daily's Christian Kennedy citing Winehouse's song "Wake Up Alone" as the song that Rihanna had borrowed from "stylistically."

"Love on the Brain" has dark lyrics that depict a destructive, yet addictive relationship, with themes of "swinging back and forth between the highs and lows of love". Some critics believed the song was an "ode to a violent lover", possibly referring to Chris Brown after the pair's highly published domestic violence case and rekindled romance years later. Lyrical examples include "It beats me black and blue but it fucks me so good / That I can't get enough / Must be love on the brain." Adam R. Holz of the conservative organization Focus on the Family's website PluggedIn.com noted the song "mingles nihilism, lust and at least the metaphorical presence of physical abuse". Jessica Eggert of Mic agreed, noting that "Rihanna wears her heart right on her sleeve and takes no prisoners in expressing the pain of a metaphorically and physically damaging-yet-undying love."

== Critical reception ==
"Love on the Brain" was highly acclaimed by music critics. Stephen Thomas Erlewine of AllMusic picked it as a highlight from the album, noting that Rihanna's "voice is hoarse and ravaged, yet she's also controlled and precise, knowing how to hone these imperfections so her performance echoes classic soul while feeling fresh". Julianne Escobedo Shepherd of Billboard deemed it "a doo-wop powerhouse sung in a Prince-adjacent falsetto — and is proof Rihanna’s been working with some primo vocal coaches". Patrick Ryan of USA Today called the song an "easy highlight," noting the "cozy doo-wop nostalgia". Emily Mackay of NME noted the doo-wop groove, deeming Rihanna's vocals a "powerhouse vocal performance". Jordan Bassett of the same publication called it "totally brilliant, with the singer showcasing the kind of vocals we’ve not heard from her before". Safy-Hallan Farah of Spin wrote favorably of her singing, while James Grabay of the same magazine named it an "effortlessly time-traveling track".

Chris Gerard of PopMatters noted the song was "one of the more interesting tracks on the album", addressing her "Macy Gray-like drawl during the verses". Corbin Reiff of The A.V. Club highlighted the track's "deep soulful tones" and felt her voice was "the undeniable focal point" of it. Nolan Feeney of Time declared that "Love on the Brain" and "Higher" "offer the most stirring vocal performances of her career". Jessica McKinney of Vibe agreed, calling the song a "soulful performance that showcases her own range". Neil McCormick of The Daily Telegraph wrote that "Love on the Brain" is a "standard, mid-tempo retro soul anthem" that "in the context of Anti,...sounds like a work of pop genius". Calling it "hypnotic," Eric Renner Brown of Entertainment Weekly remarked that "she delivers some of her finest vocal moments yet". Sarah Rodman of The Boston Globe picked it as "essential", stating: "As she implores 'Don't you stop loving me,' her performance has a grit, sweat, and weariness to it that's unusual and humanizing."

Da'Shan Smith of Billboard stated "Love on the Brain" became the most subtly influential Pop single of 2017, as the music industry experienced "a prominent surge of retro-harkening balladry, across different musical genres", following the success of this song on Pop radio; which he described as "a rare find today, because traditional R&B’s presence on the format is an oddity." Marilyn Manson cited Anti as an influence on his band's album Heaven Upside Down, saying "Strangely enough, one of the records that influenced this album strongly, and it can’t be taken literally, is Rihanna, her last record. That one song, ‘Love on the Brain’, it really hit me because I saw her perform it and she just... meant it." "Love On The Brain" received a nomination for Choice Music: Pop Song at the 2017 Teen Choice Awards.

== Chart performance ==
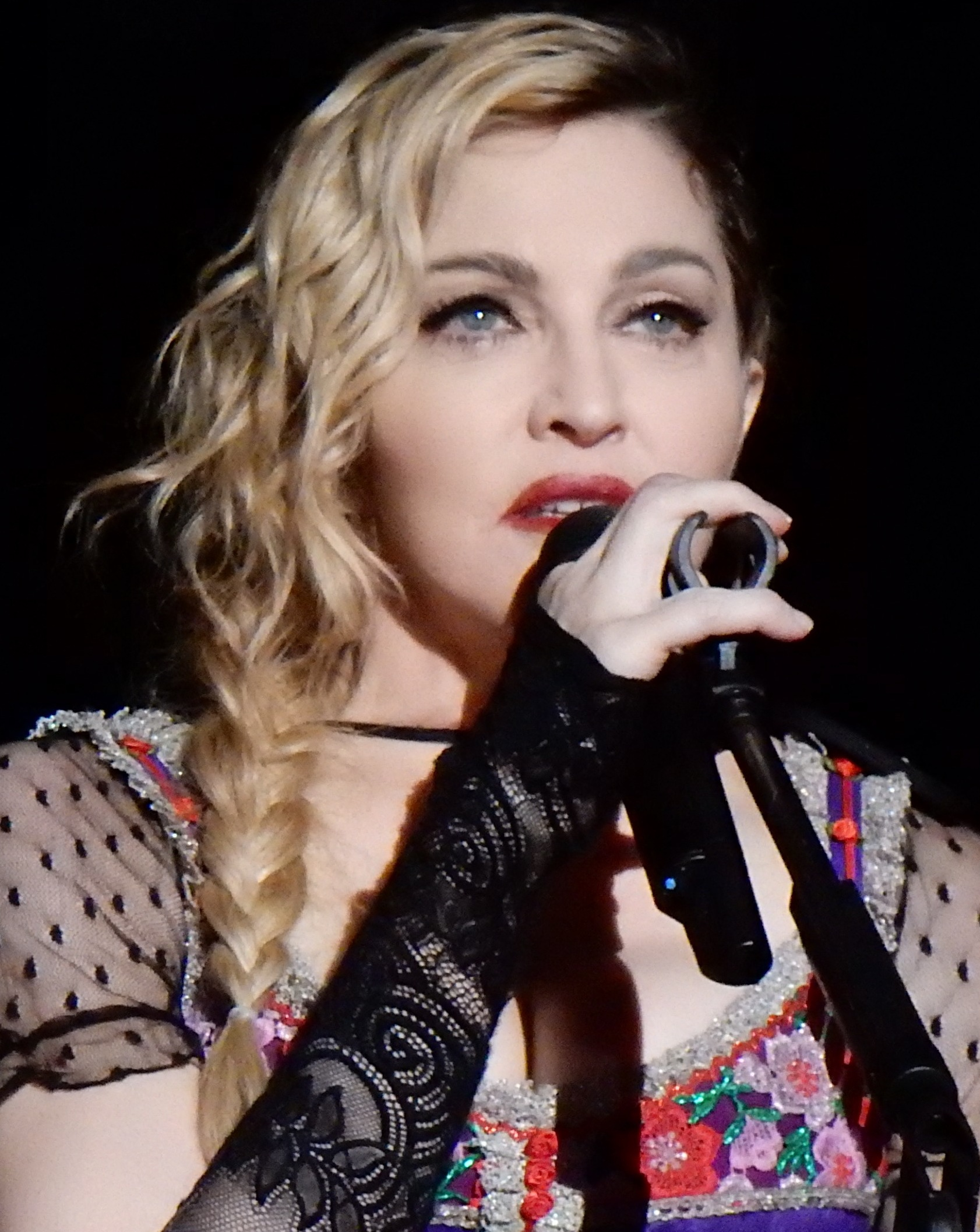
With "Love on the Brain", Rihanna became the female artist with second most top-ten singles on the Billboard Hot 100 chart history, only behind Madonna (pictured).

Unusually for an established superstar, the song achieved sleeper success, attaining its peak position several months after its release. Following Rihanna's performance at the 2016 Billboard Music Awards, "Love on the Brain" debuted on the US Billboard Hot 100 at number 83, marking Rihanna's 55th entry on the chart. After being released as a single in November 2016, the song re-entered the Hot 100 at number 80. In its sixth week on the chart, the song rose to number 34, becoming Rihanna's third top-forty hit from Anti, as well as her 46th top-forty entry on the Hot 100, placing her at number three on the list of women with most top-forty hits. Two weeks later, "Love on the Brain" reached number 20, becoming the third top-twenty single from Anti, and Rihanna's forty-second top-twenty hit. In its eighteenth week, "Love on the Brain" climbed from number 13 to number eight and became her thirtieth top-ten single. With doing that, she broke a tie for third place with Michael Jackson, with whom, both had 29 top-ten singles. Rihanna became the artist with the third most top-ten singles in Hot 100 history, only behind Madonna (with 38), and The Beatles (with 34). It was also "the second-fastest accumulation of 30 Hot 100 top 10s", according to Billboard's Gary Trust. In the issue dated 25 March 2017, the song climbed to number 5, becoming Rihanna's 22nd top five hit, leading her to break a tie for fifth place with Elvis Presley (who has 21 top-five hits).

In November 2016, "Love on the Brain" entered the Hot R&B/Hip-Hop Songs chart at number 30. In the same week, the song was the most added track on contemporary hit radio, causing it to rise to number 24 on the Billboard Pop Songs chart; to date it has reached number 6 on both charts. In the week ending 22 January 2017, the song became her 28th top 10 single on Radio Songs, extending her record for the most top-ten singles on the chart. The song also became her twenty-eighth number-one on the US Dance Club Songs chart in the issue dated 21 January 2017; she remains in second place behind record holder Madonna, who has achieved forty-six. As of March 2023, "Love on the Brain" has accumulated over 1.07 billion streams and 2,000,000 downloads in the United States.

In Canada, the song debuted on the Canadian Hot 100 at its peak of number 22 after being released as a single. In the week of 3 December 2016, it re-entered the top-forty at number 38. In New Zealand, "Love on the Brain" debuted at number 40 on the release of Anti. It reached number 15 over the following weeks, becoming Rihanna's thirty-second solo top-twenty single. Similarly, in France, "Love on the Brain" charted after Anti's release at number 71. After its release, it re-entered at number 138. After weeks outside the top 100, the song reached a new peak of number 69 in the week of 13 January 2017. Three weeks later, the song managed to crack the top twenty, reaching number 12. It became Anti's second top twenty hit. In Austria, the song debuted at number 53 and has peaked at number 7, while in Germany it debuted at number 100, and has reached a peak of number 21 to date, becoming the album's second highest-charting single. In Poland, "Love on the Brain" peaked at number one for four non-consecutive weeks in 2016.

== Live performances ==
Rihanna included "Love on the Brain" in the encore of her Anti World Tour. After attending the show at Wembley Stadium, Lewis Corner of Digital Spy called the performance "a triumph, as Rihanna's tone on the Motown sway is pure joy". Michael Cragg of The Guardian claimed that the performance was "delivered with such conviction it feels like you’re watching a different artist". On 22 May 2016, Rihanna performed the song at the 2016 Billboard Music Awards, with Billboard describing it as a "standout" of the event. Sarah Grant of Rolling Stone called it a "gut-wrenching solo performance," comparing her stage persona to that of Whitney Houston, due to the "storm of tour-de-force vocals".

On 28 August 2016, Rihanna received the Michael Jackson Video Vanguard Award at the 2016 MTV Video Music Awards. In honour, she performed a medley consisting of "Stay", "Diamonds" and "Love on the Brain". Christopher Rosa of Glamour called the performance "breath-taking", while Billboard noted: "Her vocals, which are sometimes under-appreciated by critics and even fans, were gorgeous and impressive, reminding everyone that beyond the chart-toppers and DGAF behavior, there's an astonishing voice that propelled her to where she is now".

== Cover versions and usage in media ==
On 19 May 2016, "Love on the Brain" was featured on the season 12 finale of long-running ABC medical drama Grey's Anatomy. It charted at the top of the Top TV Songs Chart, powered by 40,000 Shazam tags. Furthermore, according to Nielsen Music, 45,000 downloads and 8.1 million US streams were made in the same month. American singer Kelly Clarkson performed the song during a Facebook live session on 26 August 2016. Danish singer MØ covered "Love on the Brain" on the BBC Radio 1Xtra's Live Lounge segment. British girl band Little Mix covered the song on iHeartRadio's Honda Stage. British soap actress Jane Danson also performed to the song in February 2019 on ITV show Dancing on Ice. This performance made the single re-enter the UK iTunes Chart at #45 later that evening. American rapper and singer Machine Gun Kelly covered the song in April 2020, during his "Lockdown Sessions", at Marilyn Manson's request, giving the song a pop punk vibe, with Kelly performing a guitar solo at the end of the track. The cover was later included as a bonus track on his fifth album, Tickets to My Downfall. In May 2020, Devon Gilfillian released an Amazon Original Cover of the song available only on Amazon Music.

== Formats and track listings ==
- CD single
1. "Love on the Brain" – 3:44
2. "Love on the Brain" (Don Diablo Remix) – 3:28
- Digital download – Dance Remixes
1. "Love on the Brain" (Don Diablo Remix) – 3:28
2. "Love on the Brain" (Gigamesh Remix) – 3:43
3. "Love on the Brain" (John-Blake Remix) – 3:31
4. "Love on the Brain" (RY X Remix) – 3:37

== Credits and personnel ==
Credits adapted from Rihanna's official website.

Locations

- Recorded at Westlake Studios in Los Angeles, California
- Mixed at Larrabee Studios in Universal City, California
- Mastering at Sterling Sound Studios in New York City, New York

Personnel

- Rihanna – vocals, writing
- Fred Ball – writing, production, keyboards, drums
- Joseph Angel – writing, keyboards, drums, arrangement
- Jarle Bernhoft – guitar, bass
- Marcos Tovar – vocal recording
- Kuk Harrell – vocal recording, vocal production
- Manny Marroquin – mixing
- Chris Galland – mixing assistant
- Jeff Jackson – mixing assistant
- Ike Schultz – mixing assistant
- Chris Gehringer – mastering

== Charts ==
=== Weekly charts ===
Weekly chart performance
Chart (2016–2017)	Peak position
Australia (ARIA)	100
Austria (Ö3 Austria Top 40)	7
Belgium (Ultratop 50 Flanders)	33
Belgium (Ultratop Flanders Urban)	8
Belgium (Ultratop 50 Wallonia)	16
Canada Hot 100 (Billboard)	22
Canada AC (Billboard)	6
Canada CHR/Top 40 (Billboard)	4
Canada Hot AC (Billboard)	8
Czech Republic Singles Digital (ČNS IFPI)	80
Finland Airplay (Radiosoittolista)	46
France (SNEP)	12
Germany (GfK)	21
Greece (IFPI)	16
Greece (Foreign Airplay Chart) (IFPI)	5
Hungary (Rádiós Top 40)	23
Hungary (Single Top 40)	34
Iceland (RÚV)	2
Netherlands (Dutch Top 40 Tipparade)	6
New Zealand (Recorded Music NZ)	15
Poland Airplay (ZPAV)	1
Portugal (AFP)	32
Romania (Radiomonitor)	16
Scottish Singles Sales (Official Charts)	59
Slovakia Airplay (ČNS IFPI)	5
Slovakia Singles Digital (ČNS IFPI)	19
Slovenia (SloTop50)	26
Spain (Promusicae)	24
Sweden (Sverigetopplistan)	96
Switzerland (Schweizer Hitparade)	26
UK Hip Hop/R&B (Official Charts)	28
US Billboard Hot 100	5
US Adult Contemporary (Billboard)	9
US Adult Pop Airplay (Billboard)	7
US Dance Club Songs (Billboard)	1
US Dance Airplay (Billboard)	5
US Hot R&B/Hip-Hop Songs (Billboard)	3
US Pop Airplay (Billboard)	3
US Rhythmic Airplay (Billboard)	4

2023 weekly chart performance
Chart (2023)	Peak position
Global 200 (Billboard)	58

2026 weekly chart performance
Chart (2026)	Peak position
Israel International Airplay (Media Forest)	15
UK Hip Hop/R&B (Official Charts)	17

=== Year-end charts ===
2016 year-end chart performance
Chart (2016)	Position
Poland (ZPAV)	42
US Hot R&B Songs (Billboard)	32

2017 year-end chart performance
Chart (2017)	Position
Argentina (Monitor Latino)	63
Austria (Ö3 Austria Top 40)	66
Belgium (Ultratop Wallonia)	70
Belgium R&B/Hip-Hop (Ultratop Wallonia)	17
Canada (Canadian Hot 100)	73
France (SNEP)	141
Iceland (Tónlistinn)	19
Switzerland (Schweizer Hitparade)	76
US Billboard Hot 100	33
US Adult Contemporary (Billboard)	20
US Adult Top 40 (Billboard)	27
US Hot Dance Club Songs (Billboard)	3
US Dance/Mix Show Airplay (Billboard)	23
US Hot R&B/Hip-Hop Songs (Billboard)	21
US Mainstream Top 40 (Billboard)	14
US Rhythmic (Billboard)	20

== Certifications ==
Certifications and sales
Region	Certification	Certified units/sales
Australia (ARIA)	6× Platinum	420,000^{‡}
Belgium (BRMA)	Gold	10,000^{‡}
Brazil (Pro-Música Brasil)	Diamond	250,000^{‡}
Canada (Music Canada)	7× Platinum	560,000^{‡}
Denmark (IFPI Danmark)	3× Platinum	270,000^{‡}
France (SNEP)	Diamond	333,333^{‡}
Germany (BVMI)	Platinum	600,000^{‡}
Italy (FIMI)	Platinum	100,000^{‡}
New Zealand (RMNZ)	7× Platinum	210,000^{‡}
Poland (ZPAV)	Diamond	250,000^{‡}
Portugal (AFP)	4× Platinum	100,000^{‡}
Spain (Promusicae)	2× Platinum	120,000^{‡}
Sweden (GLF)	Gold	20,000^{‡}
United Kingdom (BPI)	2× Platinum	1,200,000^{‡}
United States (RIAA)	Diamond	10,000,000^{‡}
Streaming
Greece (IFPI Greece)	3× Platinum	6,000,000^{†}
Summaries
Worldwide	—	15,000,000
^{‡} Sales+streaming figures based on certification alone.^{†} Streaming-only figures based on certification alone.

== Release history ==
Release dates and formats
Region	Date	Format(s)	Labels	Ref.
United States	27 September 2016	Rhythmic contemporary radio; urban contemporary radio	Roc Nation; Def Jam	
United States	11 October 2016	Contemporary hit radio	Roc Nation; Def Jam	
United States	14 November 2016	Adult contemporary radio; hot adult contemporary radio; modern adult contemporary radio	Roc Nation; Def Jam	
Italy	23 December 2016	Radio airplay	Roc Nation; Def Jam	
Germany	20 January 2017	CD	Def Jam; Universal Music	

== See also ==
- List of number-one singles of 2016 (Poland)
- List of Billboard Dance Club Songs number ones of 2017
