= New Love =

2015 single by Dua Lipa

Single by Dua Lipa

from the album Dua Lipa
- Released: 21 August 2015
- Recorded: August 2014
- Studio: TaP / Strongroom 7 (London)
- Genre: Synth-pop
- Length: 4:31
- Label: Dua Lipa Limited
- Songwriters: Dua Lipa; Emile Haynie; Andrew Wyatt
- Producers: Emile Haynie; Andrew Wyatt

Dua Lipa singles chronology
| "New Love" (2015) | "Be the One" (2015) |

Music video
- "New Love" on YouTube

"New Love" is the debut single by English singer Dua Lipa from her eponymous debut studio album (2017). It was written by Lipa and its producers Emile Haynie and Andrew Wyatt about the singer's struggle to find her place in the music industry. The song is a synth-pop ballad with neo soul and R&B elements as well as a stomping, tribal drum beat throughout. Several music critics complimented the song's showcase of Lipa's vocals.

Despite receiving limited attention upon its independent release on 21 August 2015, "New Love" became popular among music tastemakers and helped Lipa receive a longlisting in the BBC's Sound of... critics poll for 2016. Photographer Nicole Nodland directed the music video which is a montage of filtered footage of Lipa in Los Angeles doing activities she enjoys. The song was performed during three of the singer's concert tours, the most recent being the Self-Titled Tour in 2017 and 2018.

== Background and composition ==
"New Love"
A synth-pop track, "New Love" sees Lipa singing accompanied by stomping, tribal drums in the first verse, which builds to a climax before the chorus.

Dua Lipa co-wrote "New Love" with Emile Haynie and Andrew Wyatt. At the time, Lipa went into many failed writing sessions trying to recreate her track "Hotter than Hell" and it was only after this transpired that she wrote "New Love". She wrote the song about being undecided on her sound and message in a music industry that "often seems to neither want nor need you." According to Lipa, the track is about "facing the fear of losing the only thing that matters to you." Both Haynie and Wyatt handled the production. The song was written in New York and the vocals were recorded at TaP Studio / Strongroom 7 in London. The mixing was handled by Manny Marroquin at Larrabee North Studios in Universal City, California while it was mastered at London's Metropolis Studios by John Davis.

Musically, "New Love" is a synth-pop ballad with neo soul and R&B elements. The song runs for 4 minutes and 31 seconds and has a structure of verse, refrain, bridge, chorus, verse, refrain, bridge, chorus, middle eight, bridge, chorus. It is composed in 4/4 time and the key of A-flat major, with a syncopated pop tempo of 90 beats per minute. The verses have a D♭maj7–E♭ chord progression, while the chorus follows an A♭maj7–D♭maj7–B♭m–E♭ sequence. The song has a stomping, tribal drum beat throughout and Lipa's deep, full-throated vocal is stretched in the production to feintly echo. The verses build to a climax before cutting to a simpler chorus. The singer cascades around the track's two-word title and uses melisma in the chorus. Her vocal range spans from E♭_{3} to C_{5}.

== Release and promotion ==
"New Love" was premiered online by New York City magazine The Fader on 20 August 2015. It was released the following day for digital download and streaming by the singer's independent record label, Dua Lipa Limited, as her debut single. Recalling her decision to release the single, Lipa said: "When I showed 'New Love' to people, they'd say, 'Oh, I didn't expect that'. I loved that reaction, so I went with it." Remixes by Jarreau Vandal and Para One were released on 29 January 2016. The latter's remix makes use of vocoder noodling and synth streaks that give it a subtle G-funk feel, while Lipa's vocals are converted into a 1980s-style with R&B-pop hooks.

"New Love" was first included on the Austria, Germany and Switzerland exclusive extended play (EP) for Lipa's single "Be the One" as the second track, released on 19 February 2016. A live, shortened version of the song was released as the second track on Lipa's 8 July 2016-released extended play Spotify Sessions. It is also included on Lipa's Urban Outfitters-exclusive vinyl extended play The Only, released on 21 April 2017 serving as the fifth and final track. "New Love" serves as the lead single from Lipa's self-titled debut studio album, released as the deluxe edition's fifteenth track on 2 June 2017. It was originally intended to be placed as the seventh track on the standard edition of the album, and appears in that position on the Austrian, German and Swiss version of the album.

Lipa gave her first live performance of "New Love" at Eurosonic Noorderslag in the Netherlands on 13 January 2016. It was included in the set lists for Lipa's 2016 UK Tour and Hotter than Hell Tour, accompanied by two keyboardists and a drummer. She also performed the track at Lollapalooza on 30 July 2016, her Mother Teresa Square concert in Albania on 10 August 2016, and at the SWR3 New Pop Festival in Germany on 16 September 2016. During the Self-Titled Tour in 2017 and 2018, Lipa performed the song backed only by a guitarist.

== Reception ==
In contrast to her later singles, "New Love" received limited attention. However, it proved popular among music tastemakers and helped Lipa receive a longlisting in the BBC's Sound of... critics poll for 2016. The 405 named it "a contender for the strongest debut of 2015." Courtney Buck, a reviewer from the publication, found the production "strangely haunting", but cited Lipa's vocals as "the star of the show". Chris Martins of Spin felt the production was "wisely restrained enough to cede the stage to Lipa's incredible pipes, capable of belting hooks and seeping seduction in equal measure." Caroline Sullivan wrote in The Guardian that the singer showcased a "smoke-darkened voice older and more disillusioned than her years." Jocasta Jones of The Independent on Sunday called Lipa's vocals "beautiful".

For The Fader, Lindsey Weber saw "New Love" as "surprisingly heavy" and called the lyrics as "resentful, nostalgic, and always ready for a change". She went on to praise Lipa's "throaty and mature" voice, comparing it to that of Joss Stone and Lady Gaga. Gigwise's Catherine Elliott deemed it an "absolute blinding pop song" and "a welcomed relief to all of the over styled, plastic tackiness of mainstream pop." Writing for The Line of Best Fit, Laurence Day viewed the song as "a sizzling piece of rhythmic synthpop", while NME's Thomas Smith named it a "trippy, soul-tinged ballad". In April 2020, Christopher Rosa of Glamour ranked "New Love" as Lipa's seventh worst track criticizing its lack of longevity, but praising the song's showcase of Lipa's "robust" vocals.

== Music video ==
=== Production and release ===
The music video for "New Love" was directed by photographer Nicole Nodland, who also shot the single's cover art. It was edited by Jackson Ducasse and filmed in Super 8 film format. The video was filmed in one day in Los Angeles. After Lipa expressed disappointment for a different track's postponed music video shoot, Nodland suggested to direct the clip for "New Love" during a dinner with the singer. As the video was a low-budget production, Lipa wrote her own treatment for it. Her styling was inspired by 1990s fashion and vintage clothing. According to the singer, the concept involved activities she enjoys doing and alludes to "a life in the day of Dua Lipa".

Some scenes were entirely improvised while Nodland and Lipa were driving through Los Angeles. Among these were the inflatable slide on Melrose Avenue which Lipa slid down before being charged to use it, and the white-suited men who were spontaneously asked to dance after Lipa spotted them taking pictures at Hollywood Hills. The visual shortens the song's length to 3 minutes and 59 seconds. The music video premiered alongside the song on 20 August 2015 on The Fader's website. It was released on YouTube the following day.

A scene from the Super 8 film format music video that makes heavy use of colour and effect filters in the style of psychedelic art

=== Synopsis and reception ===
The music video uses many colour and effect filters in the style of psychedelic art. The video speed adapts to the tempo of the song with slow motion sequences playing during the chorus. Lipa is shown wandering carefree through a street and eating sweets that turn her mouth blue. At Tattoo Mania in Los Angeles, Keith Haring drawings are tattooed on Lipa's thumbs as a tribute to New York City, her "favourite place in the world after London." In another scene, Lipa lights a cigarette from a candle on a birthday cake and swigs a jug of milk while shopping in a supermarket in a silk kimono. During other segments she is shown cycling in a red dress, blowing bubbles between two men, strolling with heart balloons, and twirling with sparklers.

Writing for DIY, Jamie Milton said the video "felt like a celebration in colourful, dynamic pop". Eoin Butler of The Irish Times described it as "like The Big Lebowski, just a little sexier."

== Track listings ==
- Digital download and streaming
1. "New Love" – 4:31
2. "New Love" (Instrumental) – 3:56
3. "New Love" (Acapella) – 4:33
- Digital download and streaming – remixes
1. "New Love" (Jarreau Vandal remix) – 4:01
2. "New Love" (Para One remix) – 4:28

== Personnel ==
- Dua Lipa – vocals
- Emile Haynie – production
- Andrew Wyatt – production
- Manny Marroquin – mixing
- Chris Galland – mixing assistance
- Ike Schultz – mixing assistance
- John Davis – mastering

== Release history ==
Release dates and formats for "New Love"
| Region | Date | Format | Version | Label | Ref. |
|---|---|---|---|---|---|
| Various | 21 August 2015 | Digital download; streaming | Original | Dua Lipa Limited | |
| Various | 29 January 2016 | Digital download; streaming | Remixes | Dua Lipa Limited | |
