= List of number-one singles of 2016 (Poland) =

This is a list of the songs that reached number-one position in official Polish single chart in ZPAV in 2016.

== Chart history ==
Issue Date	Song	Artist(s)	Reference(s)
January 2	"Don't Be So Shy" (Filatov & Karas remix)	Imany	
January 9	"Renegades"	X Ambassadors	
January 16	"Ocean Drive"	Duke Dumont	
January 23	"W dobrą stronę"	Dawid Podsiadło	
January 30	"I'm Not Rich" (Hitimpulse remix)	The King's Son feat. Shaggy	
February 6	"Cake by the Ocean"	DNCE	
February 13	"Agosto"	Álvaro Soler	
February 20	"Agosto"	Álvaro Soler	
February 27	"Ocean Drive"	Duke Dumont	
March 5	"Show Me Love"	Robin Schulz & Richard Judge	
March 12	"Like I'm Gonna Lose You"	Meghan Trainor feat. John Legend	
March 19	"Like I'm Gonna Lose You"	Meghan Trainor feat. John Legend	
March 26	"Faded"	Alan Walker	
April 2	"Faded"	Alan Walker	
April 9	"Hymn for the Weekend"	Coldplay	
April 16	"Hymn for the Weekend"	Coldplay	
April 23	"Hymn for the Weekend"	Coldplay	
April 30	"Faded"	Alan Walker	
May 7	"Stressed Out"	Twenty One Pilots	
May 14	"Stressed Out"	Twenty One Pilots	
May 21	"Stressed Out"	Twenty One Pilots	
May 28	"Be the One"	Dua Lipa	
June 4	"Sofia"	Álvaro Soler	
June 11	"Never Go Away"	C-BooL	
June 18	"Never Go Away"	C-BooL	
June 25	"Sofia"	Álvaro Soler	
July 2	"Tamta dziewczyna"	Sylwia Grzeszczak	
July 9	"Tamta dziewczyna"	Sylwia Grzeszczak	
July 16	"Tamta dziewczyna"	Sylwia Grzeszczak	
July 23	"Tamta dziewczyna"	Sylwia Grzeszczak	
July 30	"Tamta dziewczyna"	Sylwia Grzeszczak	
August 6	"Tamta dziewczyna"	Sylwia Grzeszczak	
August 13	"Error"	Natalia Nykiel	
August 20	"Tell It to My Heart"	Filatov & Karas	
August 27	"If I Were Sorry"	Frans	
September 3	"If I Were Sorry"	Frans	
September 10	"Lost on You"	LP	
September 17	"Kill Em with Kindness"	Selena Gomez	
September 24	"Lost on You"	LP	
October 1	"Lost on You"	LP	
October 8	"Lost on You"	LP	
October 15	"Lost on You"	LP	
October 22	"Perfect Strangers"	Jonas Blue featuring JP Cooper	
October 29	"Treat You Better"	Shawn Mendes	
November 5	"Królowa łez"	Agnieszka Chylińska	
November 12	"Love on the Brain"	Rihanna	
November 19	"Królowa łez"	Agnieszka Chylińska	
November 26	"Love on the Brain"	Rihanna	
December 3	"Królowa łez"	Agnieszka Chylińska	
December 10	"Love on the Brain"	Rihanna	
December 17	"Love on the Brain"	Rihanna	
December 24	"Human"	Rag'n'Bone Man	
December 31	"Magic Symphony"	C-BooL feat. Giang Pham	

== Number-one artists ==
Position	Artist	Weeks at #1
1	Sylwia Grzeszczak	6
2	LP	5
3	Álvaro Soler	4
3	Rihanna	4
4	Coldplay	3
4	Alan Walker	3
4	Twenty One Pilots	3
4	Agnieszka Chylińska	3
4	C-BooL	3
5	Meghan Trainor	2
5	John Legend (as featuring)	2
5	Frans	2
6	Imany	1
6	X Ambassadors	1
6	Dawid Podsiadło	1
6	The King's Son	1
6	Shaggy (as featuring)	1
6	DNCE	1
6	Robin Schulz	1
6	Richard Judge (as featuring)	1
6	Dua Lipa	1
6	Natalia Nykiel	1
6	Filatov & Karas	1
6	Selena Gomez	1
6	Jonas Blue	1
6	JP Cooper (as featuring)	1
6	Shawn Mendes	1
6	Rag'n'Bone Man	1

== See also ==
- Polish Music Charts
