= Last Dance (Dua Lipa song) =

2016 single by Dua Lipa

Single by Dua Lipa

from the album Dua Lipa
- A-side: "Be the One"
- Released: 9 February 2016
- Recorded: October 2014-2015
- Studio: KasaKoz (Toronto); TaP / Strongroom 7 (London)
- Genre: Chillwave; dance-pop; post-EDM
- Length: 3:48
- Label: Dua Lipa Limited
- Songwriters: Dua Lipa; Stephen "Koz" Kozmeniuk; Talay Riley
- Producer: Stephen "Koz" Kozmeniuk

Dua Lipa singles chronology
"Be the One" (2015)	"Last Dance" (2016)	"Hotter than Hell" (2016)

Music video
- "Last Dance" on YouTube

"Last Dance" is a song by English singer Dua Lipa from her eponymous debut studio album (2017). The song was written by Lipa, Talay Riley and its producer Stephen "Koz" Kozmeniuk. The song was released for digital download and streaming on 9 February 2016 through Dua Lipa Limited, after having premiered on BBC Radio 1 a day earlier. It is a chillwave, dance-pop and post-EDM song that features a contemporary dance-heavy production. Lipa was inspired by being tired and homesick, and lyrically, she sings about a relationship that could crash at any second.

"Last Dance" received acclaim from music critics, with many praising Lipa's vocals. The song peaked at number four on Billboard's Twitter Emerging Artists chart. An accompanying music video premiered via YouTube on 18 February 2016. It was directed and produced by both Jon Brewer and Ian Blair, and was filmed in California's rainforests. The song appeared in an advert for Lipa's campaign with Jaguar Cars and was promoted by her with numerous live performances in 2016, mainly on her Hotter than Hell Tour.

== Background and composition ==
"Last Dance" was written by Dua Lipa, Talay Riley and Stephen "Koz" Kozmeniuk, with the latter of the three solely handling production. They wrote the song in October 2014 during the singer's first trip to Honduras, after she had many failed writing sessions attempting to recreate the sound of "Hotter than Hell" (2016). It was her third writing session in a day and Lipa decided to write about the fact that she was tired and homesick. Lipa recalled writing the song as "a very honest moment," being able to capture her feelings in that exact moment. She went on to say that every time she listens to the song, Lipa recalls that moment. After leaving the session, Lipa was unsure about the song, though after hearing the finished version, she fell in love with it. Lipa stated that it is the sound she wanted her album to have and is the song she would take to producers and say "this is my sound." "Last Dance" was recorded at KasaKoz Studios in Toronto while the vocals were recorded at TaP Studio / Strongroom 7 in London. Mixing took place at BabelFish Studios (Note: The location of BabelFish Studios is not indicated in the liner notes of Dua Lipa.) by Matty Green and the song was mastered by John Davis at Metropolis Studios in London.

"Last Dance"
"Last Dance" uses house synth chords and the lyrics describe a relationship that could end at any second.

Musically, "Last Dance" is a chillwave, dance-pop and post-EDM song. It runs for 3 minutes and 48 seconds, and follows a structure of verse, bridge, chorus, verse, bridge, chorus, middle eight, breakdown. The song is composed in 4/4 time and the key of A minor, with a driving beat tempo of 120 beats per minute and a chord progression of F(add2)–Am–C/G. Lipa's vocals span from the low note of A_{3} to the high note of D_{5}, showing a sense of urgency with them and using looped vocals. The track begins slowly, with Lipa vocally whispering. It builds up to where Lipa is enunciating every lyric. The chorus is mostly instrumental, featuring electronic sounds and a dance beat. The middle eight contains a breakdown, where Lipa vocally hits her high notes. The track has a contemporary dance-heavy, tribal and glitchy production with house synth chords and a bassline rumble. Lyrically, the song contains Tumblr-inspired lyrics about an intense relationship that could crash at any second.

== Release and promotion ==
In October 2015, Lipa revealed that the song would be released in January of the following year. "Last Dance" premiered on 8 February 2016 via Annie Mac's BBC Radio 1 show. The song was released for digital download and streaming the following day through Lipa's independent record label, Dua Lipa Limited, as the third single from her eponymous debut studio album. It first appeared as the third track on the Austrian, German, and Swiss-exclusive extended play (EP) for the singer's previous single "Be the One", released on 19 February 2016. The song was included as the B-side of the CD single for "Be the One" which was released on 11 March 2016. Remixes by Coucheron and Stefan Ponce were released on 25 March 2016. The song was intended to be the second track on the album but was ultimately removed from the standard track listing and included as the closing track on the deluxe edition, released 2 June 2017. However, it appears as the second track on the Austrian, German and Swiss version of the album.

In 2018, the song was included in an advert for Lipa's campaign with Jaguar, titled "Join The Pace". Lipa performed "Last Dance" for the first time on 13 January 2016 at the Eurosonic festival. It was also included on the set list for Lipa's Hotter than Hell Tour (2016). Lipa performed the song in 2016 during her MTV push artist live performance. She also performed the song for her MTV Setlist show on 20 November 2016 at the Iridium in New York City.

== Music video ==
Lipa dancing in a technicoloured forest in the music video

The music video for "Last Dance" was directed and produced by Jon Brewer alongside Ian Blair, while edited by Jackson Ducasse. It premiered to YouTube on 18 February 2016. The visual was filmed during December 2015 in the rainforests of California, with Lipa recalling that it was really cold in the state. It opens with Lipa in a red-lit bathroom, going into a bath and coming out of a lake in a technicoloured rainforest. She then begins to run and dance in the forest, wearing a T-shirt dress. In another scene, Lipa is seen wearing a black bra and mesh pants. At multiple points, the visuals flicker into 3D territory. Lipa is also seen dancing with her hands up in a looped fragment, as well as making an eagle hand gesture to nod to her Albanian heritage.

== Reception ==
"Last Dance" was met with acclaim from music critics. Kim Taylor Bennett of Vice compared the song to the works of Rihanna, calling it "ballsy" and "beautiful." She went on to praise Lipa's vocal flexibility, writing her voice is "powerful one minute and a magnetically vulnerable the next." Writing for Pulse Media, Jessica Boyle also compared the song to Rihanna and categorized the lyrics as "standalone," and Lipa's voice as "smokey." She concluded that it would sound nice with a club remix. In The Irish Times, Ailbhe Malone praised the song's production and lyrics mix, while comparing the breakdown in the middle eight to Cashmere Cat. Vulture's Justin McCraw commended Lipa's vocals but also said that it is not "vocally adventurous". He concluded by stating the song "is worth getting hurt over". William Defebaugh of V noted that the song highlights Lipa's "strong, sultry vocals" and "savy song-writing skills".

Idolator's Bianca Gracie called "Last Dance" a "flirty [tune]" that will "immediately hit you at your waistline," courtesy of Lipa's "sultry and bold" vocals. She went on to call the production "fluttering" and the song as a whole a "solid future festival staple." For A Bit of Pop Music, Michiel Vos praised Lipa's vocal abilities and compared the chorus to Justin Bieber's Purpose (2015), and Major Lazer. Sebas E. Alonso of Jenesaispop also compared the song to the music of Major Lazer, while The 405's Sean Ward called it "thrilling." For Clash, Robin Murray called the track "gorgeous" and "infectious," with "innate energy" and a "real pop intelligence." "Last Dance" peaked at number four on the US Billboard Twitter Emerging Artists chart, lasting for seven weeks on the chart.

== Track listings ==
- Digital download and streaming
1. "Last Dance" – 3:48
- Digital download and streaming – remixes
1. "Last Dance" (Stefan Ponce remix) – 4:57
2. "Last Dance" (Coucheron remix) – 3:02

== Personnel ==
- Dua Lipa – vocals
- Stephen "Koz" Kozmeniuk – production, keyboards, programming, backing vocals
- Talay Riley – backing vocals
- Matt Vlahovich – additional keyboards
- Michael Sonnier – engineering assistance
- Matty Green – mixing
- John Davis – mastering

== Certifications ==
Certifications and sales for "Last Dance"
Region	Certification	Certified units/sales
Poland (ZPAV)	Gold	25,000^{‡}
^{‡} Sales+streaming figures based on certification alone.

== Release history ==
Release dates and formats for "Last Dance"
Region	Date	Format	Version	Label	Ref.
Various	9 February 2016	Digital download; streaming	Original	Dua Lipa Limited	
Various	25 March 2016	Digital download; streaming	Remixes	Dua Lipa Limited	
