= Nothing to Lose (Vassy song) =

Single by Vassy
- Released: 2 September 2016
- Recorded: 2016
- Genre: Electronic Dance-pop, House
- Length: 3:28
- Label: Musical Freedom
- Songwriters: Vassy; Tiesto
- Producer: Tiesto

Vassy singles chronology
"T.U.T.P" (2016)	"Nothing to Lose" (2016)

"Nothing to Lose" is a Dance-pop/electronic single recorded by Australian singer/songwriter Vassy, and co-produced with Tiësto. The track became her third number one single in the United States on Billboard's Dance Club Songs chart, reaching the summit in its February 4, 2017 issue.

== Track listings ==
Digital download

1. "Nothing to Lose" - 3:28

Digital download (Remixes)

1. Nothing To Lose (Kue Remix)
2. Nothing To Lose (Kue Radio Mix)
3. Nothing To Lose (Anders Young Remix)
4. Nothing To Lose (Kobe Bourne And JK West Remix)
5. Nothing To Lose (OBIS Remix)
6. Nothing To Lose (Brierley Remix)
7. Nothing To Lose (Kue Radio Edit)

== Charts ==
=== Weekly charts ===
Chart (2016–17)	Peak position
US Dance Club Songs (Billboard)	1
US Hot Dance/Electronic Songs (Billboard)	32

=== Year-end charts ===
Chart (2017)	Position
US Dance Club Songs (Billboard)	24
