= Daniel Kaufman =

American screenwriter

- Born: Daniel Kaufman; New York City, US
- Occupation(s): director, Film producer, screenwriter, actor, author
- Years active: 1994–present
- Website: http://dannykaufman.tv/

Daniel Kaufman is an American director, film producer and screenwriter from New York City. Before graduating from UCLA he worked as an actor and photographer. Simon & Schuster published a collection of Kaufman's photography titled To Be A Man in 1994. Kaufman traveled across the country asking men from all walks of life what it means to be a man in today's world. Kaufman collected more than 70 visual and written portraits that were featured in the book.

As a director, Kaufman worked with such clients as Budweiser with the Goodby ad, McDonald's, Nestle, Walmart and Comcast. He also directed spec spots for Imotors.com, Comedy Central and Post Cereals. In 2002 Kaufman received recognition at the Association of Independent Commercial Producers (AICP) for The Latter, "Cat's in the Cradle" which was said to be "The best work you may never see." Kaufman also directed "Full Force Flavor" for snack company Tornados which features two brothers who get blown away by what looks like a wind tunnel after opening a microwave oven door.

In addition to his commercial directing, Kaufman remains active in long-form content. In 2012, Kaufman directed Listen to Grandpa, Andy Ling – a television pilot starring Elliott Gould.

== Awards ==
Along with co-writer, Michael Craven, he wrote the feature screenplay BIG SHOT which won the Gold Prize in Comedy at the PAGE International Screenplay Awards. Kaufman's script, Clean won the Samuel Goldwyn Writing Award.
