= Blow Your Mind (Mwah) =

2016 Single by Dua Lipa

- Remix EP Artwork

Single by Dua Lipa

from the album Dua Lipa
- Written: February 2016
- Released: 26 August 2016
- Recorded: 2015–2016
- Studio: The Synagogue (Los Angeles); TaP / Strongroom 7 (London)
- Genre: Disco; electropop
- Length: 2:58
- Label: Warner Bros.
- Songwriters: Dua Lipa; Jon Levine; Lauren Christy
- Producer: Jon Levine

Dua Lipa singles chronology
"Hotter than Hell" (2016)	"Blow Your Mind (Mwah)" (2016)	"No Lie" (2016)

Music video
- "Blow Your Mind (Mwah)" on YouTube

"Blow Your Mind (Mwah)" is a song by English singer Dua Lipa from her eponymous debut studio album (2017). The song was written by Lipa alongside Lauren Christy and its producer Jon Levine. The song was released for digital download and streaming through Warner Bros. Records on 26 August 2016 as the fifth single from the album, and impacted contemporary hit radio as Lipa's first single in the United States. It is a disco and electropop song with dark moombahton and chambré tropical house elements. The production includes tropical beats, indietronica vocals and sawtooth synths. Lyrically, the song is about being comfortable in one's own skin.

Several music critics complimented Lipa's attitude in "Blow Your Mind (Mwah)" as well as its message. Some reviewers criticized her vocal performance, specifically as she blows a kiss at the end of the chorus. Commercially, it gave Lipa her second entry on the UK Singles Chart, where it reached number 30, and her first US Billboard Hot 100 entry, reaching number 72. It additionally reached the top 40 of charts in the Wallonia region of Belgium, Ireland and Scotland. The song was awarded gold certifications in Italy and the United States as well as platinum ones in Canada and the United Kingdom.

The music video for "Blow Your Mind (Mwah)" was directed by Kinga Burza and released on 12 September 2016. It was filmed in London's Barbican Centre, and features Lipa and her girl gang posing in the area, as well as walking around; model Tawan Kedkong makes an appearance. According to Lipa, the video is a campaign for niceness. Critics commended the video's fashion looks. Lipa further promoted the song in 2016 with live performances for BBC Radio 1's Live Lounge, the Gouden Televizier-Ring Gala, and Today. The song received several remixes, including ones by Alex Metric and Karma Kid, as well as an acoustic version.

== Background and release ==
Dua Lipa co-wrote "Blow Your Mind (Mwah)" with Jon Levine and Lauren Christy, with Levine solely handling the production. They wrote it in Los Angeles in February 2016. After working as a model, Lipa was inspired for the song after being told that she needs to lose weight in order to be successful as a model. The collaborators decided to write about being comfortable in one's own skin. The song was recorded at The Synagogue in Los Angeles, while the vocals were recorded at TaP / Strongroom 7 in London. Serban Ghenea mixed it at MixStar Studios in Virginia Beach, Virginia while it was mastered by Chris Gehringer at Sterling Sound in New York.

Lipa announced the release of "Blow Your Mind (Mwah)" on 24 August 2016. It was released for digital download and streaming two days later as the fifth single from Dua Lipa, along with the pre-order of the album. The song was sent for radio airplay in Italy on 2 September 2016. The song was released to contemporary hit radio formats in the United States on 20 September 2016 as Lipa's first single in the country. An acoustic version was released on 21 October 2016 alongside a remix extended play (EP) featuring remixes by Alex Metric, Karma Kid, Night Moves and Black Saint. "Blow Your Mind (Mwah)" was included as the opening track on Lipa's 21 April 2017-released The Only EP. It also appears as the sixth track on her debut album, released 2 June 2017.

== Music and lyrics ==
Musically, "Blow Your Mind (Mwah)" is a disco and electropop song, with tropical beats alongside dark moombahton and chambré tropical house elements. It runs for 2 minutes and 58 seconds, and has a structure of verse, bridge, chorus, post-chorus, verse, bridge, chorus, post-chorus, breakdown, chorus, post-chorus. The song is composed in 4/4 time and the key of D minor, with a moderate groove tempo of 109 beats per minute and a chord progression of B♭–Gm–Dm–Csus. Lipa's vocals were categorized as indietronica and range from A_{3} to C_{5}. The lyrics discuss having the upper hand in a relationship and rejecting people who want others to change.

The song begins slowly, with ethereal synths, and echoing tribal drums. The first verse has empowerment themes and sees Lipa being secure with herself, even though at one time she was not. In the bridge, Lipa sings about her desire to pursue music and how people told her she was crazy for it, as well as commenting that people think she has changed but her aspirations have only gotten bigger. The chorus has k-pop sawtooth synths, electro beats and synth-bass hits. Vocally, Lipa blows a kiss at the end of the chorus and half-talks the post-chorus. Lipa describes the chorus as being "in the heat of an argument," lyrically asking someone why they keep coming back to her if they dislike her aspirations and who she is. She eventually states that the person will love her blind, meaning that they have chosen Lipa because they would not want her any other way. The post-chorus sees Lipa wanting to live her life, not needing money or superficial stuff. In the second verse, Lipa addresses the lover, showing that they enjoy the arguments.

== Critical reception ==
Anna Gaca of Spin called the song "a short, bombastic number" with "equal parts club-ready sultriness." Idolator's Rachel Sonis labeled it "feisty" and said that "it's playful, bubbly, and a perfect number to serve as her first official single in the US." She went on to state that the song "oozes confidence" and categorized the beat as "pulsing" and "infectious." Mike Nied, also of Idolator, labelled the song a "flirty bop with a playful message." For The Guardian, Graeme Virtue viewed it as "a slice of futuristic disco that slyly incorporates an actual kiss-off into its chorus".

Ben Hogwood of musicOMH viewed "Blow Your Mind (Mwah)" as "a confident declaration of intent" and "outright feminine power," but criticized Lipa blowing a kiss in the style of Holly Valance, stating the song "spoils itself" with that aspect. However, Raúl Guillén of Jenesaispop enjoyed the kiss, writing that it is "one of those silly details that you cannot later get out of your head" and called the chorus as a whole one of her "most effective." The same website later named it the 73rd best song of 2016, praising the combination of a "forceful" bass and vocal performance as well as calling the chorus "casual and fresh," while concluding by stating the song is "frankly irresistible." In The Line of Best Fit, Claire Biddles categorized the song's aesthetic as "high-heeled in a club" and called it "the most enticing moments in recent pop." Of the same magazine, Laurence Day stated "it's fizzing with youthful energy and oozes cheeky joy from every refrain."

The staff of Billboard called the song "cheeky" and stated that it "impressively showcases her attitude and nuanced voice." In Renowned for Sound, Rachael Scarsbrook compared the song to Carly Rae Jepsen and wrote that it "gets people going." She concluded by stating, "[t]here isn't one negative way this track could be perceived." For The Guardian, Hannah J Davies called "Blow Your Mind (Mwah)" "unapologetically in-your-face" as well as "strong and stylish." Alim Kheraj of DIY viewed the song as "flirtatious," but criticized the lack of longevity, writing that it is "still immensely enjoyable, although over time [it's] lost some of [its] glittery sheen." Rick Pearson from Evening Standard criticized the song, calling it "irritating in the extreme." "Blow Your Mind (Mwah)" won Performance of the Year by an International Artist at the Wish 107.5 Music Awards.

== Commercial performance ==
"Blow Your Mind (Mwah)" debuted at number 50 on the UK Singles Chart issue dated 2 September 2016, becoming Lipa's second entry on the chart, following "Hotter than Hell" (2016). In its seventh week, the song reached a peak of number 30 and lasted for an additional eight weeks afterwards. In August 2019, the song was certified platinum by the British Phonographic Industry (BPI) for selling 600,000 units in the UK. In Ireland, the song debuted at number 75 on the Irish Singles Chart and eventually peaked at number 40. The song was more successful in Scotland, where it debuted at number 24 on the Scottish Singles Chart and later reached a peak of number 15. In Belgium, it reached number 44 on the Ultratop 50 Flanders chart and number 37 on the Ultratop 50 Wallonia chart. The song was awarded a gold certification in Italy from the Federazione Industria Musicale Italiana (FIMI) for track-equivalent sales of 25,000 units.

The song became Lipa's third entry on the ARIA Singles Chart of Australia, on which it reached number 59. In the US, "Blow Your Mind (Mwah)" became Lipa's first entry on the Billboard Hot 100, where it debuted and peaked at number 72 on the issue dated 5 November 2016, though the song only lasted one week. It reached number 23 on the Mainstream Top 40 chart and the summit of the Dance Club Songs chart. The song also earned Lipa a spot on Billboard's emerging artists of the week dated 2 September 2016. In June 2018, the song was certified gold by the Recording Industry Association of America (RIAA) for sales of 500,000 certified units in the US. In Canada, it was awarded a double platinum certification from Music Canada (MC) for selling 160,000 track-equivalent units. In June 2018, the song reached number 65 on the South Korean Gaon Music Chart.

== Music video ==
The music video for "Blow Your Mind (Mwah)" premiered via YouTube on 12 September 2016. It was directed by Kinga Burza and filmed at the Barbican Centre in London. Tawan Kedkong, and Lipa's friends Sarah and Rosie make appearances in the visual. Burza cut the video at his house while on Skype with editor Emilie Aubry in Los Angeles. The production company was Partizan Darkroom while The Mill graded and post-produced the video. Jason Oakley handled the production while Claire Stubbs did the executive production and post-producer from Lucy Mason. Other crew members include production manager Lucy Rogers, first assistant director Dominic Asbridge, second assistant director John Joe O'Driscoll, director of photography Benoit Soler, focus puller Thomas Nicholson, second clapper loaders Jomar O'Meally and Will Gardner, gaffer Rik Burnell, art director Anna Rhodes, wardrobe from Lorenzo Possecco, hair from Anna Cofone, make-up from Francesca Brazzo, colourist Oisín O'Driscoll, commissioner Caroline Clayton, steadicam Richard Lewis and location manager Thomas Gale. When asked about it, Lipa stated that "the whole video is a campaign for niceness. It's like the girl gang that everyone can be a part of."

Lipa singing through a megaphone, accompanied by her girl group holding rainbow flags and signs in the music video. This was compared to Karl Lagerfeld's Spring 2015 Chanel runway show and features an easter egg of Lipa's song "Kiss and Make Up" (2018).

The music video opens with Lipa and her girl gang posing against a charcoal wall. Lipa is seen wearing a diamond "Mwah" choker and the girls appear in a manner that was noted for being individualistic. They are then seen posing and dancing in the modern Barbican centre, on a bench, in a flower garden and walking around the buildings. The group chews gum and blow bubbles, as well as riding skateboards. They are also seen walking in a tunnel, where Lipa walks backwards while singing to the camera. Eventually, the group holds a pride parade as Lipa sings through a megaphone and the girls are seen holding rainbow flags alongside signs that say "Dua for President" and "You Can Sit With Us". At the end, the group go to a rooftop on which they dance. The video closes with the group holding a sign with the song's title on it over the railing of the rooftop.

Nied called the visual a "fashionable affair" and a "simple but striking offering." The staff of V viewed the video as a "walking fashion editorial" and compared it to Karl Lagerfeld's Spring 2015 Chanel runway show. For Fuse, Bianca Gracie stated that the "Mwah" choker and "Dua for President" sign were video highlights. In Coup De Main Magazine, Rose Riddell called it a "sassy video of solidarity." The staff from DIY stated that the video makes London look like a paradise.

== Live performances ==
"Blow Your Mind (Mwah)" was first performed live during Lipa's Hotter than Hell Tour (2016) and was included on regular set lists for the tour. It was also performed live during her Self-Titled Tour (2017–18). Lipa performed the song at Capital FM's Jingle Bell Ball in 2016 and 2017, respectively, as well as at the Summertime Ball in the latter year. Lipa performed the song on BBC Radio 1's Live Lounge, released 29 September 2016. On 13 October of that year, Lipa performed the song at the Gouden Televizier-Ring Gala in the Netherlands. On 20 November 2016, she performed the song at the Iridium in New York City as part of her MTV Setlist show. She performed the song for American talk show Today on 29 November 2016. Lipa performed the song during a session for her Critics' Choice Award at the 2017 Brit Awards. The following year, she performed it for a live session with iHeartRadio.

== Track listings ==
- Digital download and streaming
1. "Blow Your Mind (Mwah)" – 2:58
- Contemporary hit radio – radio edit
1. "Blow Your Mind (Mwah)" – 2:58
- Digital download and streaming – acoustic version
1. "Blow Your Mind (Mwah)" [acoustic] – 2:39

- Digital EP – remixes
1. "Blow Your Mind (Mwah)" [Alex Metric remix] – 5:00
2. "Blow Your Mind (Mwah)" [Karma Kid remix] – 3:35
3. "Blow Your Mind (Mwah)" [Night Moves remix] – 4:09
4. "Blow Your Mind (Mwah)" [Black Saint remix] – 5:35

== Personnel ==
- Dua Lipa – vocals
- Jon Levine – production, engineering, keyboards, Rhodes, bass, guitar, drum programming
- Serban Ghenea – mixing
- John Hanes – engineering for mix
- Chris Gehringer – mastering

== Charts ==
=== Weekly charts ===
Chart performance for "Blow Your Mind (Mwah)"
Chart (2016–2018)	Peak position
Australia (ARIA)	59
Belgium (Ultratop 50 Flanders)	44
Belgium (Ultratop 50 Wallonia)	37
Canada CHR/Top 40 (Billboard)	39
CIS Airplay (TopHit)	57
Colombia (National-Report)	88
Finland Airplay (Radiosoittolista)	31
Hungary (Rádiós Top 40)	8
Ireland (IRMA)	40
Netherlands (Dutch Tipparade 40)	4
Netherlands (Single Tip)	4
New Zealand Heatseeker Singles (Recorded Music NZ)	6
Portugal (AFP)	99
Scottish Singles Sales (Official Charts)	15
Slovakia Singles Digital (ČNS IFPI)	85
South Korea International (Gaon)	65
Sweden Heatseeker (Sverigetopplistan)	5
UK Singles (Official Charts)	30
US Billboard Hot 100	72
US Dance Club Songs (Billboard)	1
US Pop Airplay (Billboard)	23
Venezuela (Record Report)	29

=== Year-end charts ===
2017 year-end chart performance for "Blow Your Mind (Mwah)"
Chart (2017)	Position
US Dance Club Songs (Billboard)	21

== Certifications ==
Certifications and sales for "Blow Your Mind (Mwah)"
Region	Certification	Certified units/sales
Canada (Music Canada)	2× Platinum	160,000^{‡}
Denmark (IFPI Danmark)	Gold	45,000^{‡}
France (SNEP)	Gold	100,000^{‡}
Italy (FIMI)	Gold	25,000^{‡}
New Zealand (RMNZ)	Platinum	30,000^{‡}
Poland (ZPAV)	2× Platinum	100,000^{‡}
Spain (Promusicae)	Gold	30,000^{‡}
Sweden (GLF)	Gold	20,000^{‡}
United Kingdom (BPI)	Platinum	600,000^{‡}
United States (RIAA)	Gold	500,000^{‡}
^{‡} Sales+streaming figures based on certification alone.

== Release history ==
Release dates and formats for "Blow Your Mind (Mwah)"
Region	Date	Format	Version	Label	Ref.
Various	26 August 2016	Digital download; streaming	Original	Warner Bros.	
Italy	2 September 2016	Radio airplay	Radio edit	Warner Bros.	
United States	20 September 2016	Contemporary hit radio	Radio edit	Warner Bros.	
Various	21 October 2016	Digital download; streaming	Acoustic	Warner Bros.	
Various	21 October 2016	Digital download; streaming	Remixes	Warner Bros.	

== See also ==
- List of music videos set in London
- List of Billboard Dance Club Songs number ones of 2017
