= Hotter than Hell (Dua Lipa song) =

2016 single by Dua Lipa

Single by Dua Lipa

from the album Dua Lipa
- Released: 6 May 2016
- Recorded: 2014
- Studio: KasaKoz (Toronto); TaP / Strongroom 7 (London)
- Genre: Dance-pop; electropop; tropical house
- Length: 3:07
- Label: Dua Lipa Limited
- Songwriters: Dua Lipa; Adam Midgley; Tommy Baxter; Gerard O'Connell
- Producer: Stephen "Koz" Kozmeniuk

Dua Lipa singles chronology
"Last Dance" (2016)	"Hotter than Hell" (2016)	"Blow Your Mind (Mwah)" (2016)

Music video
- "Hotter than Hell" on YouTube

"Hotter than Hell" is a song by English singer Dua Lipa from her eponymous debut studio album (2017). It was written by Lipa and Ritual band members Adam Midgley, Tommy Baxter and Gerard O'Connell, with Stephen "Koz" Kozmeniuk handling the production. The song is responsible for getting Lipa signed to Warner Bros. Records and helped Lipa develop the sound of her debut album. It is a dance-pop, electropop, tropical house song driven by marimbas and synthesizers that contains elements of disco and R&B-house. Lyrically, the song sees the singer taunting an ex-boyfriend who cannot resist her love.

"Hotter than Hell" was released for digital download and streaming through the singer's independent record label, Dua Lipa Limited, on 6 May 2016 as the fourth single from Dua Lipa. Many music critics complimented the steamy and tropical sound of the song as well as its confident lyrics. Commercially, the song became a moderate success. It was Lipa's first entry on the UK Singles Chart, where it peaked at number 15. The song also charted within the top 40 of charts in Belgium (Flanders and Wallonia), the Netherlands, Poland and Slovenia. It is certified platinum in the United Kingdom, the Netherlands, Norway and Sweden.

The music video for "Hotter than Hell" accompanied the song's release and was directed by Emil Nava. Filmed in a warehouse in London, the visual shows a dark party with several backgrounds and lighting, showcasing the lost kids of London. Lipa promoted the song with live performances on The Tonight Show Starring Jimmy Fallon, RTL Late Night and Sommarkrysset; the former of the three was her US television debut. Remixes by Miike Snow, Matoma and Shadow Child were released for further promotion.

== Background and development ==
In 2013, Dua Lipa met Ben Mawson and Ed Millett of Tap Management while holding meetings with other management companies. After recognising her talent, Mawson and Millett set up writing sessions for her, during which "Hotter than Hell" was written. The song was written by Lipa alongside Adam Midgley, Tommy Baxter and Gerard O'Connell of English electronic band Ritual. The writing began with just keys and a kick drum, with no production behind it. Lipa was inspired by her relationship with her first boyfriend, where he made her feel like she was not good enough. Lipa originally intended to scrap the song after struggling to figure out the chorus. However, she began scrolling through Tumblr where she saw the words "Hotter than Hell" written in red on a black background. She then thought, "What if he thought I was hotter than hell, and I just didn't want him?" The collaborators then changed the meaning as if Lipa had the upper hand and her boyfriend could not get enough of her. Lipa stated that writing the song was "very therapeutic" for her.

"Hotter than Hell" was recorded at KasaKoz Studios in Toronto with the vocals being recorded at TaP Studio / Strongroom 7 in London. Serban Ghenea mixed the song at Virginia Beach, Virginia's MixStar Studios while the song was mastered at Metropolis Studios in London by John Davis. It was one of the first songs written for Lipa's debut album. It dictated what the rest of the album would sound like and how she figured out her dark pop genre. The song was produced by Stephen "Koz" Kozmeniuk with additional production from Jay Reynolds. After hearing the song in 2014, Warner Bros. Records signed Lipa to a recording contract.

== Music and lyrics ==
Musically, "Hotter than Hell" is a dance-pop, electropop and tropical house song, with disco and R&B-house elements. The song runs for 3 minutes and 7 seconds, and is constructed in verse–chorus form. It is composed in 4/4 time and the key of E♭ minor, with a pop dance tempo of 110 beats per minute and a chord progression of A♭m–B–E♭m–D♭. The song has hip hop-influenced verses and pop choruses with a beat drop. The first verse, references the Arctic Monkeys' "505", where Lipa sings "you probably still adore me with my hands around your neck."

Driven by marimbas and synthesizers, the production includes, handclaps, light bongo taps, steel-drum synth jabs, church organs, and a beat that spans house, pop and tropical genres, created using a caribbean drum. Lipa uses raspy alto vocals, spanning from E_{3} to D_{5}. "Hotter than Hell" has themes of empowerment and heartache. In the lyrics, Lipa channels a boyfriend who made her feel as if she was not good enough. She taunts him while he cannot resist her love, and takes revenge for his actions, all while looking hotter than hell. The lyrics feature religious undertones. In the chorus, the singer uses hell as a metaphor to describe being away from her lover and the metaphor of heaven to describe the pleasure she gives him.

== Release ==
Lipa first mentioned the song in December 2015 during an interview with Coup De Main Magazine, in which she called it her favourite song she'd written. Lipa announced that the song would serve as the fourth single from Dua Lipa during a BBC interview in February 2016. "Hotter than Hell" was released for digital download and streaming on 6 May 2016, through Lipa's independent record label, Dua Lipa Limited. It was sent for radio airplay in Italy on 10 June 2016. The song was promoted to contemporary hit radio formats in the United States on 3 August 2016 as a promotional single.

A remix by Matoma was released on 23 June 2016. It appears on the 24 June 2016-released, Austrian, German and Swiss-exclusive remix extended play (EP), which also includes remixes by Vimalavong, Carsten Fietz, Miike Snow, Jack Wins and Shadow Child. A live version of the song appears on Lipa's Spotify Sessions EP, which was released on 8 July 2016. A worldwide remix EP with the Miike Snow, Jack Wins, Shadow Child and Vimalavong remixes, as well as one by Carsten Fietz was released on 18 July 2016. The Miike Snow remix slows down the tempo and warps its melody, as well as including a disco groove. "Hotter than Hell" later appeared as the third track on both Lipa's 21 April 2017-released The Only EP as well as her eponymous debut studio album, released on 2 June 2017. The Miike Snow remix also appears on the Japanese edition of the album as well as the Japanese edition of the album's 2018 reissue, Dua Lipa: Complete Edition, as the 18th track on both.

== Critical reception ==
In Rolling Stone, Ryan Reed labelled the song "steamy," while Spin's Dan Weiss stated that it "promises big things for her self-titled debut album." Brennan Carley, also of Spin called it "a sure sign that pop music has a bit of life and personality left in it." Joey Nolfi of Entertainment Weekly stated that Lipa makes the aging tropical musical trend sound "fresher than ever" while also writing that when listening, one "[loses] themselves on a sun-kissed club somewhere along the palm tree-lined shores of pop music Heaven." For Vulture, Justin McCraw stated that the song "[overflows] with sex appeal" and "oozes desire and temptation" as well as recommending playing it "after coming back from the bar with your third drink." Bianca Gracie of Fuse labelled the song's themes "fiery" and "confident" and the beats "intense." For Idolator, Rachel Sonis called it "moody and infectious" and labelled the chorus "sweltering."

In Cosmopolitan, Eliza Thompson described it as a "soaring dance anthem" as well as calling Lipa's vocals "smoky." NME's Thomas Smith labelled the song "a sultry and steamy pop scorcher fit for the devil's disco." In another NME review, Jamie Milton noted its nods to dancehall music. For Clash, Alex Green viewed "Hotter than Hell" as the first track on Dua Lipa to "up the ante," but criticized its lack of "genuine energy." Sean Ward of The 405 compared the song to the works of Rihanna, Christina Aguilera and Britney Spears' "Gimme More" (2007). Ben Hogwood of musicOMH viewed "Hotter than Hell" as an initially "thrilling" song but stated that it becomes "brittle" on repeated listens. For The Line of Best Fit, Claire Biddles stated that Lipa embraces "an unparalleled sexual deity" in the song. In The Guardian, Hannah J Davies praised the song for not "sounding too consciously trend-chasing."

Billboard placed "Hotter than Hell" on both their "20 Sadly Underrated Pop Songs From 2016" and "The Best Overlooked Pop Songs of the 2010s" lists, viewing as an early standout for Lipa and complimenting its chorus. Digital Spy ranked the song at number five on their mid-year list; the website commended the production elements and noted that it "proves her superstar potential" and it "could quite possibly be the best pop song that'll get released" in 2016. Popjustice ranked it as the year's seventh best song, saying it is "a good example of the 2016 tropical sound being weaved into a pop banger." The song was nominated for the 2016 Popjustice £20 Music Prize. In April 2020, Glamour's Christopher Rosa ranked "Hotter than Hell" as Lipa's ninth best song, calling it "sensual and steamy".

== Commercial performance ==
In the United Kingdom, "Hotter than Hell" debuted at number 50 on the UK Singles Chart dated 13 May 2016, becoming Lipa's first entry on the chart. In its eighth week, the song rose to a peak of number 15, where it stayed for three consecutive weeks. The song spent a total of 21 weeks on the chart. It was the most played song on BBC Radio 1 for four consecutive weeks and became the biggest mover at commercial UK radio. In May 2018, it was awarded at platinum certification from the British Phonographic Industry (BPI) for track-equivalent sales of 600,000 units in the United Kingdom. The song reached number 24 in Ireland and 6 in Scotland. In the Netherlands, "Hotter than Hell" was certified platinum by the Nederlandse Vereniging van Producenten en Importeurs van beeld – en geluidsdragers (NVPI) for 40,000 track-equivalent unit sales. The song spent a week on the country's Single Tip chart before spending 20 weeks on the Dutch Single Top 100 chart and peaking at number 32.

In Australia, "Hotter than Hell" became Lipa second entry on the ARIA Singles Chart, where it spent seven weeks. In July 2016, it debuted at number 31 and reached a peak of 17. That year, the song was awarded a gold certification from the Australian Recording Industry Association (ARIA) for selling 35,000 track-equivalent units in the Australia. The song peaked at number five on the NZ Heatseeker Singles Chart. "Hotter than Hell" reached number 13 on the Billboard Euro Digital Song Sales chart. In Sweden the song reached number 44 and sold 40,000 track-equivalent units, thus being certified platinum by the Swedish Recording Industry Association (GLF). The song further peaked at number 65 in Austria, 71 in Germany, 20 in Belgium (Flanders), 34 in Belgium (Wallonia) and 32 in Slovenia. It also holds a gold certification in Denmark and a platinum certification in Norway.

== Music video ==
The music video for "Hotter than Hell" was premiered on Lipa's YouTube channel on 6 May 2016. It was directed by Emil Nava and filmed in a London warehouse. In the video, Lipa intended to show her idea of hell, which is the underbelly of London as well as showing her hometown's "lost kids." Parts of the video were filmed using Super 8mm film. The visual was produced by Amy James with London Alley serving as the production company and Jess Bell as the executive producer. Patrick Meller was the director of photography with Sam Tidman as the art director and Aubrey Woodiwiss as the colourist. Speade served as the video's editing company with Ellie Johnson handling the editing. Electric Theatre Collective handled the video's grading while Sam Seager commissioned it.

Lipa at a party sitting on a throne in the music video, surrounded by fellow party-goers

The video is set in a warehouse, where a dark and sexy secret party is taking place. The party-goers are seen sitting on the floor and couches and a tube television appears on a stand in the middle. Lipa is seen walking into a red light and a party-goer sitting in a chair films the person across from them, before Lipa presses her hand against a brick wall. Lipa rolls a disco ball in her lap and seen in a dark room with a disco ball, before she is stands against a rainforest-painted wall. Lipa is then seen on a red throne, surrounded by the fellow party-goers. She is also seen standing in the middle of a room and flipping her hair in a blue-lit room before dancing in front of a brick wall with projections and singing on a magenta background. The party-goers are seen relaxing, filming, drawing tattoos and pouring glitter on one and other, and dancing. At one point, the party-goers film Lipa lying on a mattress.

Brittany Spanos of Rolling Stone called the backgrounds "gorgeous," while V's Layla Ilchi called the lighting "colorful" and "psychedelic." DIY called the video as a whole "surreal."

== Live performances ==
"Hotter than Hell" was included on the set lists of Lipa's Hotter than Hell Tour and The Self-Titled Tour. Lipa performed the song on the Dutch late-night talk show RTL Late Night on 2 June 2016. On 9 July, she performed it on the German game show Schlag den Star. Lipa performed the song on The Tonight Show Starring Jimmy Fallon on 2 August, making her US television debut. She was backed by a drummer and two keyboardists and wore thigh-high boots with a black mesh outfit. Sonis called the performance "smoldering," while V's Gabriella Salkin called it "stellar." She also performed "Hotter than Hell" on the Swedish show Sommarkrysset on 13 August 2016. The song was also included on Lipa's MTV setlist performance, on 20 November 2016 at the Iridium in New York City.

== Track listings ==
- Digital download and streaming
1. "Hotter than Hell" – 3:07
- Contemporary hit radio – radio edit
1. "Hotter than Hell" – 3:47
- Digital download and streaming – Matoma remix
1. "Hotter than Hell" (Matoma remix) – 3:39
- Digital EP – remixes – Austrian, German and Swiss version
1. "Hotter than Hell" (Vimalavong remix) – 4:19
2. "Hotter than Hell" (Carsten Fietz remix) – 5:58
3. "Hotter than Hell" (Dua Lipa vs. Matoma) [remix] – 3:37
4. "Hotter than Hell" (Miike Snow remix) – 4:12
5. "Hotter than Hell" (Jack Wins remix) – 4:15
6. "Hotter than Hell" (Shadow Child remix) – 6:28
- Digital EP – remixes
1. "Hotter than Hell" (Miike Snow remix) – 4:12
2. "Hotter than Hell" (Jack Wins remix) – 4:15
3. "Hotter than Hell" (Shadow Child remix) – 6:27
4. "Hotter than Hell" (Carsten Fietz remix) – 5:58
5. "Hotter than Hell" (Vimalavong remix) – 4:21

== Personnel ==
- Dua Lipa – vocals
- Stephen "Koz" Kozmeniuk – production, keyboards, drums
- Jay Reynolds – additional production, additional keyboards
- Tom Neville – vocal production
- Aadin Church – backing vocals
- Talay Riley – backing vocals
- Michael Sonier – engineering assistance
- Serban Ghenea – mixing
- John Hanes – engineering for mix
- John Davis – mastering

== Charts ==
=== Weekly charts ===
Chart performance for "Hotter than Hell"
Chart (2016)	Peak position
Australia (ARIA)	17
Austria (Ö3 Austria Top 40)	65
Belgium (Ultratop 50 Flanders)	20
Belgium (Ultratop 50 Wallonia)	34
Czech Republic Airplay (ČNS IFPI)	36
Czech Republic Singles Digital (ČNS IFPI)	96
Croatia International Airplay (HRT)	4
Euro Digital Song Sales (Billboard)	13
Finland Airplay (Radiosoittolista)	46
Germany (GfK)	71
Ireland (IRMA)	24
Mexico (Billboard Ingles Airplay)	7
Netherlands (Dutch Top 40)	10
Netherlands (Single Top 100)	32
New Zealand Heatseeker Singles (Recorded Music NZ)	5
Poland Airplay (ZPAV)	33
Romania (Airplay 100)	46
Scottish Singles Sales (Official Charts)	6
Slovakia Airplay (ČNS IFPI)	50
Slovakia Singles Digital (ČNS IFPI)	91
Slovenia (SloTop50)	32
Sweden (Sverigetopplistan)	44
UK Singles (Official Charts)	15

=== Year-end charts ===
2016 year-end chart performance for "Hotter than Hell"
Chart (2016)	Position
Belgium (Ultratop 50 Flanders)	80
Netherlands (Dutch Top 40)	46
Netherlands (Single Top 100)	97
UK Singles (OCC)	75

== Certifications ==
Certifications and sales for "Hotter than Hell"
Region	Certification	Certified units/sales
Australia (ARIA)	Gold	35,000^{‡}
Canada (Music Canada)	Platinum	80,000^{‡}
Denmark (IFPI Danmark)	Gold	45,000^{‡}
Germany (BVMI)	Gold	200,000^{‡}
Netherlands (NVPI)	Platinum	40,000^{‡}
New Zealand (RMNZ)	Platinum	30,000^{‡}
Norway (IFPI Norway)	Platinum	60,000^{‡}
Poland (ZPAV)	Platinum	50,000^{‡}
Sweden (GLF)	Platinum	40,000^{‡}
United Kingdom (BPI)	2× Platinum	1,200,000^{‡}
^{‡} Sales+streaming figures based on certification alone.

== Release history ==
Release dates and formats for "Hotter than Hell"
Region	Date	Format	Version	Label	Ref.
Various	6 May 2016	Digital download; streaming	Original	Dua Lipa Limited	
Italy	10 June 2016	Radio airplay	Radio edit	Warner Bros.	
Various	23 June 2016	Digital download; streaming	Matoma remix	Dua Lipa Limited	
Austria	24 June 2016	Digital download; streaming	Remixes EP	Vertigo; Capitol	
Germany	24 June 2016	Digital download; streaming	Remixes EP	Vertigo; Capitol	
Switzerland	24 June 2016	Digital download; streaming	Remixes EP	Vertigo; Capitol	
Various	18 July 2016	Digital download; streaming	Remixes EP	Dua Lipa Limited	
United States	3 August 2016 (Note: Release as a promotional single)	Contemporary hit radio	Radio edit	Warner Bros.	

== See also ==
- List of Live Lounge cover versions
- List of Platinum singles in the United Kingdom awarded since 2000
