= GMC =

GMC may refer to:

== People ==
- G. M. C. Balayogi (1951–2002), Indian lawyer and politician

== Government in India ==
- Gandhinagar Municipal Corporation, in Gujarat
- Gobichettipalayam Municipal Corporation, in Tamil Nadu
- Guntur Municipal Corporation, in Andhra Pradesh
- Guwahati Municipal Corporation, in Assam
- Gwalior Municipal Corporation, in Madhya Pradesh

== Religion ==
- God's Missionary Church, Methodist denomination
- Global Methodist Church, Methodist denomination

== Education, science, and technology ==
=== Med schools ===
==== Indian med schools ====
- Gandhi Medical College, in Hyderabad
- Gandhi Medical College, Bhopal
- Goa Medical College
- Government Medical College (disambiguation)
- Grant Medical College, in Mumbai
- Guntur Medical College

==== Other med schools ====
- Gomal Medical College, of Khyber Medical University in Dera Ismail Khan, Pakistan
- Gujranwala Medical College, Pakistan

=== Other uses in education ===
- Global Management Challenge, a competition for university students
- Greenwich Maritime Centre of the University of Greenwich, United Kingdom
- Georgia Military College, in Milledgeville, Georgia, United States
- Green Mountain College, in Poultney, Vermont, United States

=== Other medical institutions ===
- General Medical Council
- NHS Genomic Medicine Centres
- Geisinger Medical Center, in Danville, Pennsylvania, United States
- Gwinnett Medical Center, in Georgia, United States

=== Other uses in science and technology ===
- Geiger–Müller counter
- Genetically modified crops
- Ganglion mother cell
- Generalized Method of Cells
- Giant molecular cloud
- Global motion compensation
- Gold Master Candidate, a candidate for a final version of software ready for release to manufacturing.

== Transportation ==
- Gun motor carriage, a collective term for American World War II tank destroyers
- GMC (automobile), including a list of GMC vehicles
- General Motors company
- General Motors Canada, the Canadian subsidiary of General Motors
- A bicycle manufactured by Kent International
- Greater Manchester Challenge, a yacht
- Guangmingcheng railway station, China Railway pinyin code GMC
- Glenn Martin Cannon, a variant of the Martin MB-1 bomber

== Other uses ==
- GMC Athletic Stadium, Bambolim, Goa, India
- GMC TV, now Up TV, an American television network
- Gambia Moral Congress, a political party
- Germanic languages
- Global Movement for Children
- Great Midwest Conference, a former NCAA athletic conference
- Greater Manchester Council, a former local authority
- Green Mountain Club, an American hiking organization
- Gunman Clive
