= Future Nostalgia Tour =

2022 concert tour by Dua Lipa

- Tour by Dua Lipa
- Promotional poster for the tour
- Location: Europe; North America; Oceania; South America
- Associated album: Future Nostalgia
- Start date: 9 February 2022
- End date: 28 November 2022
- Legs: 4
- No. of shows: 91
- Supporting acts: Angèle; Elvana Gjata; Griff; Tove Lo; Tkay Maidza; Megan Thee Stallion; Caroline Polachek; Lolo Zouaï; Vickilicious
- Producers: Ceremony London
- Attendance: 1.3 million (Note: Attendance figures for the Future Nostalgia Tour from the 4 legs.)
- Box office: $101.3 million (Note: Sales figures for the Future Nostalgia Tour from all of the legs.)

Dua Lipa concert chronology
- The Self-Titled Tour (2017–2018); Future Nostalgia Tour (2022); Radical Optimism Tour (2024–2025)

The Future Nostalgia Tour was the second concert tour and first arena tour by English singer Dua Lipa, in support of her second studio album, Future Nostalgia (2020). It began on 9 February 2022 at the FTX Arena in Miami and ended on 28 November of the same year at Tirana's Skanderbeg Square. The tour visited cities across North America, Europe, South America and Oceania.

The tour was divided into four sections and an encore. It was produced by creative studio Ceremony London, promoted by Live Nation and sponsored by Truly Hard Seltzer. Lipa wore custom outfits by Balenciaga, Marine Serre, John Galliano and Mugler during the show. The Future Nostalgia Tour was met with highly positive reviews from critics, who praised Lipa's stage presence, vocals and the pace of the show. It also experienced commercial success; on the 2022 Billboard year-end boxscore chart, it was ranked the world's 18th highest-grossing tour of the year, grossing $89,302,575 from 71 shows.

The first European dates of the Future Nostalgia Tour were announced in December 2019, and were scheduled to take place from April to June of the following year. These shows were postponed several times due to the COVID-19 pandemic. Lipa announced North American and Oceanian dates in September 2021, as well as extra European dates and Latin American dates in November and December respectively. She announced the final show of the tour would take place in Tirana in November 2022, commemorating the 110th anniversary of Albanian independence.

== Background and development ==
In January 2018, whilst still on the road with her Self-Titled Tour, Lipa began working on her second studio album. Inspired by the time spent touring with her band, she aimed to create a record that mixed live instrumentation with electronic production, and that could "sit alongside some of [her] favourite classic pop songs". Lipa's management confirmed in October the following year that a global arena tour would begin in April 2020. The singer's second studio album, Future Nostalgia, was released on 27 March 2020. The first European dates of the Future Nostalgia Tour were officially announced on 2 December 2019, with ticket sales beginning four days later. The album's title track was also released in conjunction with the announcement. British DJ Buck Betty and American singer Lolo Zouaï were initially announced as opening acts for these dates.

=== Postponements and resumption ===
On 23 March 2020, Lipa announced the postponement of the tour due to the COVID-19 pandemic, but confirmed plans to add worldwide dates. The following day, the tour was rescheduled for January and February 2021 and shows in Copenhagen, Stockholm and Oslo were cancelled. On 23 October, the tour was rescheduled for a second time to September and October 2021. Ticket sales for the Future Nostalgia Tour increased by 70 percent following Lipa's livestream concert, Studio 2054, in November. On 28 June 2021, the tour was rescheduled for a third and final time to April, May and June 2022, with several new European shows announced.

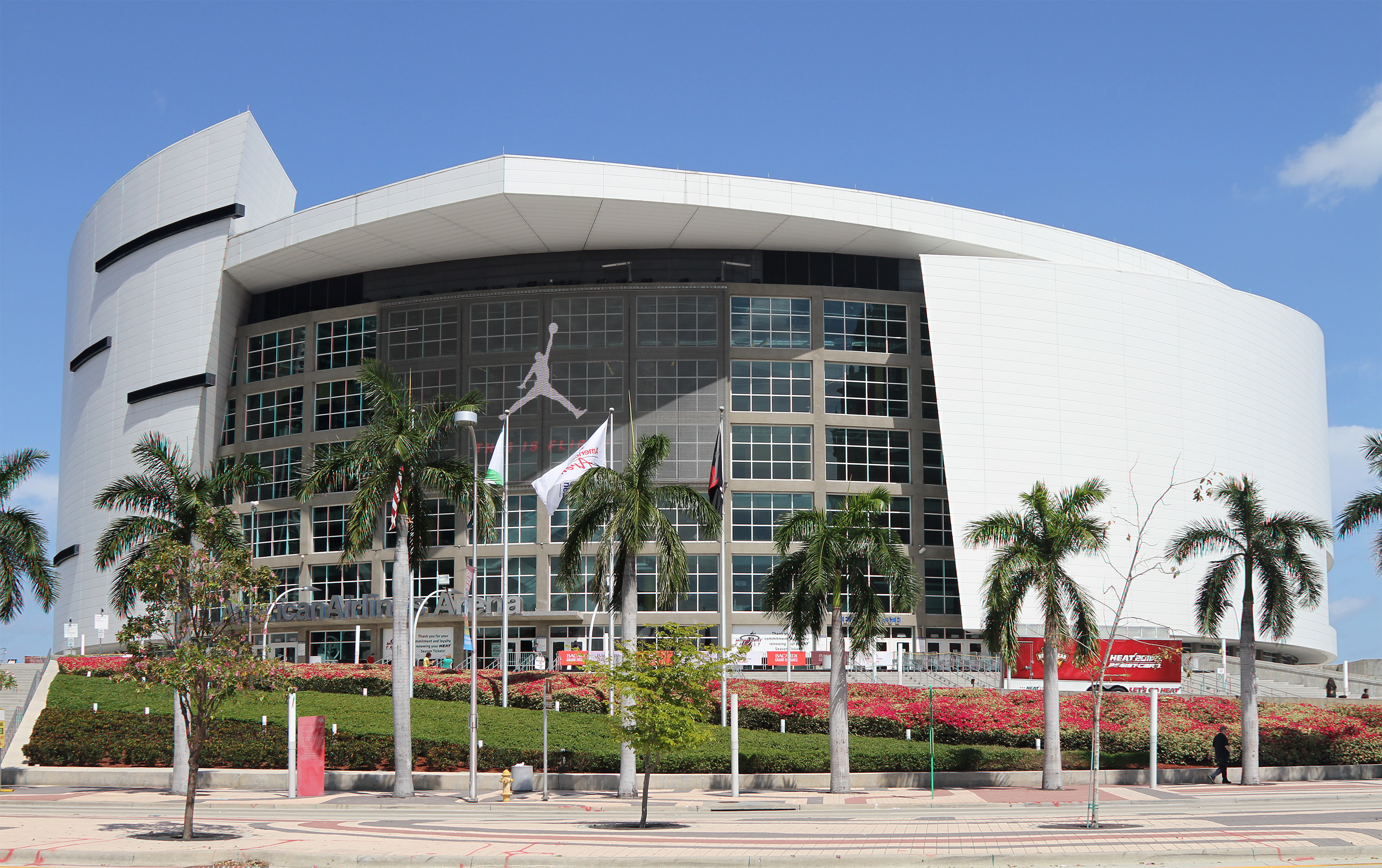
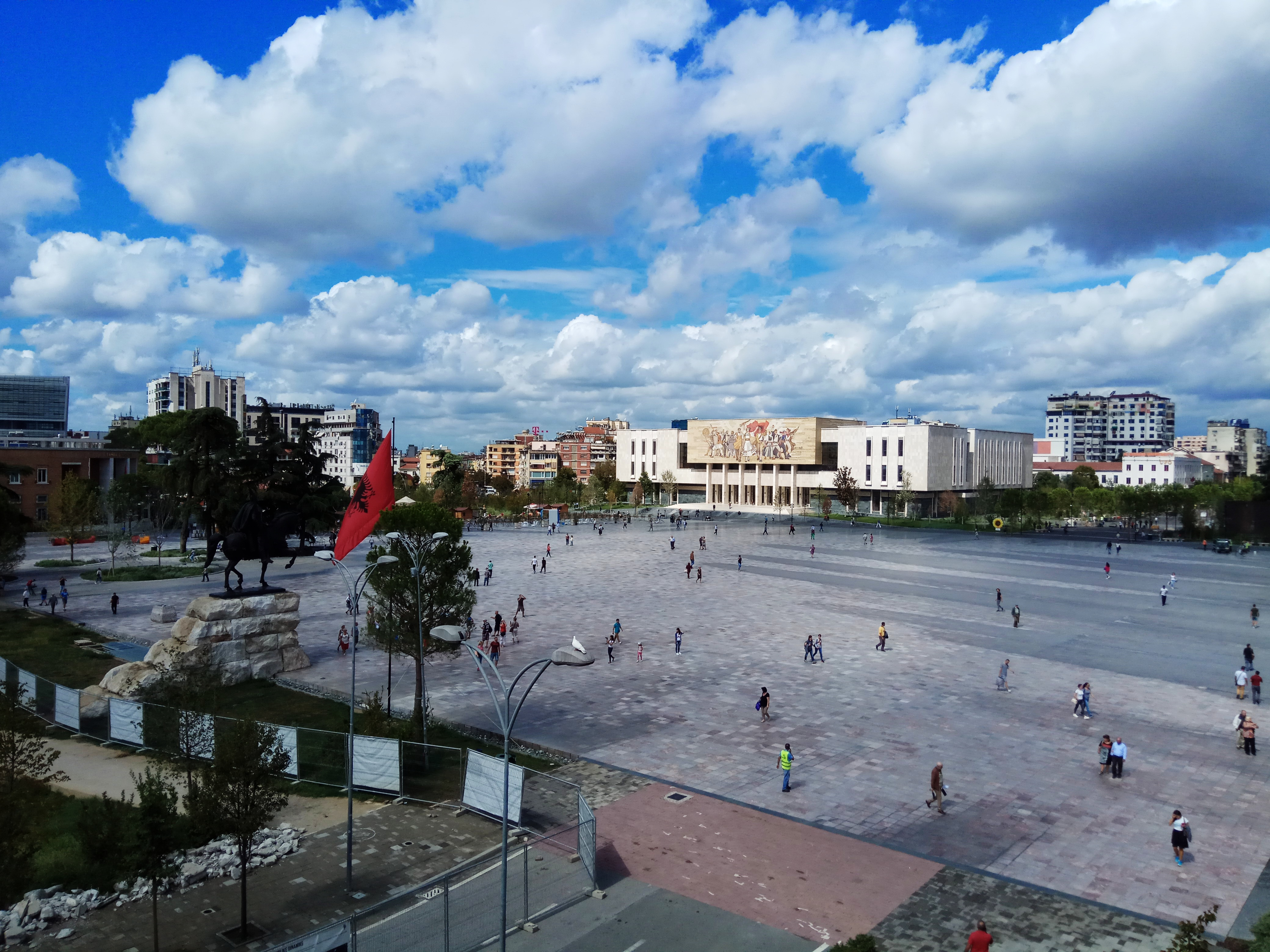
The Future Nostalgia Tour began at the FTX Arena (left) and ended at Skanderbeg Square (right).

Lipa announced shows in North America and Oceania in September 2021, with Megan Thee Stallion, Caroline Polachek and Zouaï as opening acts in the former. Extra dates in Los Angeles, Auckland, Sydney and Melbourne were added due to high demand. Four new European dates were added in November, with Angèle, Griff and Tove Lo announced as the new opening acts. Lipa announced Latin American dates in December; an extra Buenos Aires show was added after tickets for the first sold out in less than an hour. The Montreal and Toronto shows were postponed until July 2022, and shows in Milwaukee and Elmont were added. A show in São Paulo was announced in May 2022. In November 2022, Lipa announced that the final show of the tour would take place in Tirana on 28 November, commemorating Albanian Flag Day and the 110th anniversary of Albanian independence. The tour began on 9 February 2022 in Miami. It was produced by Ceremony London and promoted by Live Nation, with Truly Hard Seltzer as its official sponsor.

I'm so thrilled to tour again and see my angels in person! How amazing that we all get to dance and celebrate together once again. When I was writing Future Nostalgia, I imagined the songs being played in clubs on nights out with your mates. I'm so excited that this fantasy is finally coming true. I can't wait to experience these songs with you together live!

— Lipa on her excitement for the tour

=== Staging ===
The Future Nostalgia Tour staging was designed by Es Devlin Studio. It consisted of a main stage, as well a smaller stage near the middle of the arena connected by a runway. Lipa's band, consisting of a keyboardist, drummer, guitarist, bassist and four backup singers, appeared on a slightly lower stage on the wings of the main one. The LED screen was described as a "huge bowl", which showed visuals created by Luke Halls Studio. Lipa and her team aimed to create a show inspired by the album's title, creating multiple "worlds influenced by the 1970s, 1980s, and 1990s". The staging also featured a "nightclub ceiling" which lowered over Lipa and her dancers at a point during the show, in order to create a more intimate setting for the audience. Glow Inflatables created a series of inflatable stars, moons and clouds which were suspended above the stage to create an "intergalactic" atmosphere, as well as a giant replica of a lobster.

== Concert synopsis ==
The concert began with the house lights lowering as "Body Funk" (2017) by Purple Disco Machine began playing over the speakers and the stage backdrop cut to static before revealing the words "In Stereocolor: Future Nostalgia" with Miami Vice-styled graphics. A 1980s aerobics-themed video montage that introduced the ten dancers that included two roller skaters was then played as the first notes of "Physical" began playing. Lipa then strutted on stage to a ballet barre in centre stage to perform the song. She wore a custom Balenciaga neon-yellow catsuit that featured a lingerie-inspired corseted bodice, built-in pants and heeled boots, a textured floral pattern and matching elbow-length opera gloves while she also had rhinestones on her eyelids and wore diamond-embellished Eéra earrings. The outfit was inspired by the label's summer 2022 red carpet collection. Her dancers wore royal blue outfits, also by the design house, with some sporting long sleeve spandex outfits and others wearing baggy tracksuits made from cotton terry jersey. During the song's performance, they performed 1980s aerobic choreography and Lipa vamped down the runway of the stage.

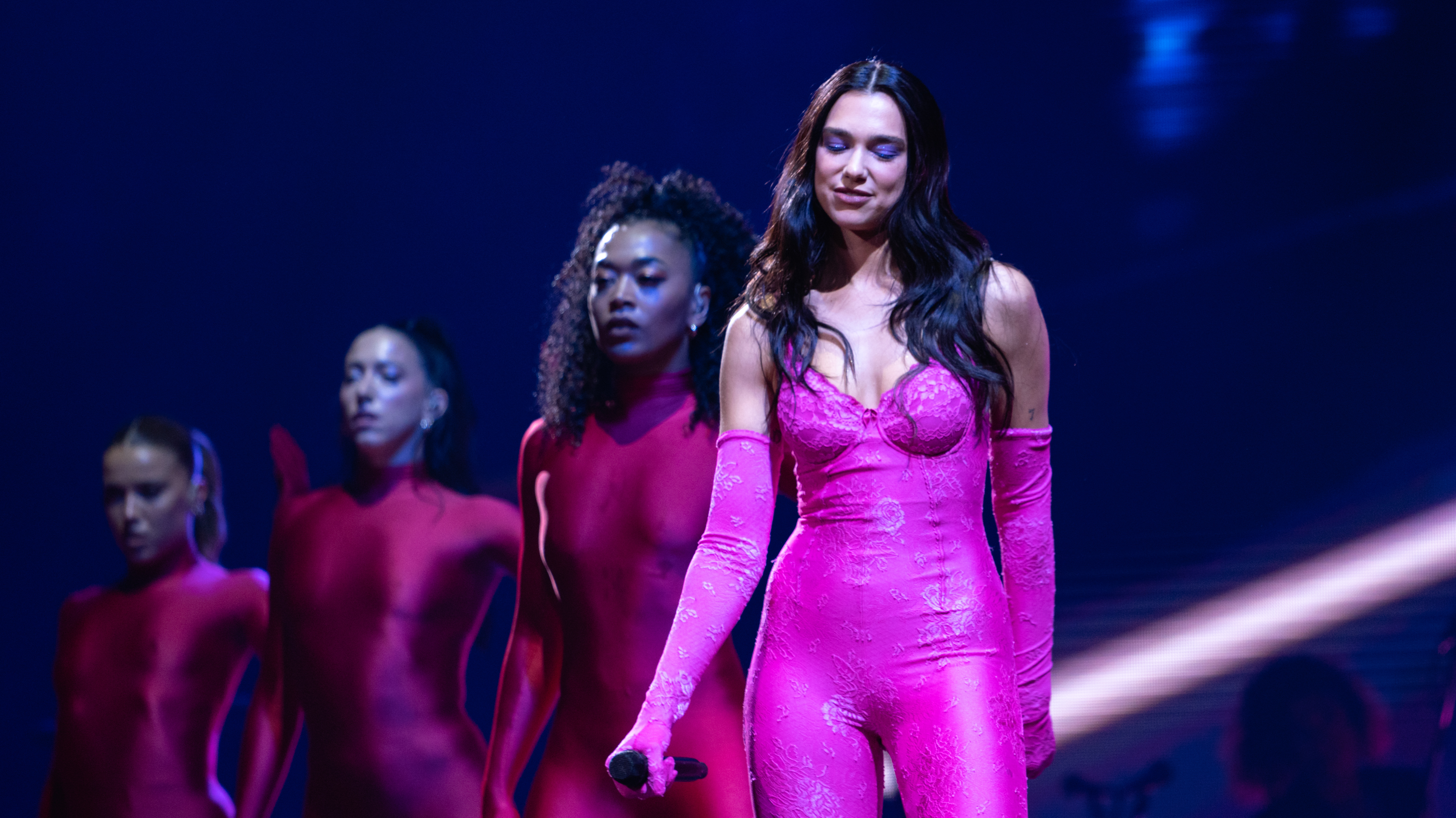
Lipa performing during the first act of the Future Nostalgia Tour in London

Following this, there was a seamless transition into "New Rules" where Lipa and her dancers performed choreography similar to that of the song's accompanying music video, including strutting down the runway using umbrella props in the style of Singin' in the Rain (1952). The big screen during the song featured flamingos and retro cars, also similar to the song's music video alongside a personalized screen for the city the concert took place. In the following song "Love Again", Lipa performed square dance choreography and lassoing technique similar to those used in the song's music video. The backdrop for the song had a Martian space western theme. For "Cool", Lipa performed with a mic stand centre stage in the shadow a CGI disco ball as two dancers in light-up rollerblades skated around her. Lipa sang "Pretty Please", "Break My Heart" and "Be the One" before sprinting off stage for a costume change. Simultaneously, an interlude featuring an elevator music-like muted version "IDGAF" and a graphic novel theme titled "Under the Sea" that included a lobster attack was played.

Going into the second act, Lipa changed into a shimmery, sequin-studded silver and white one piece bodysuit with a one-armed top and briefs-style bottoms. "We're Good" was the first song performed in the act, which she sang in front of a giant lobster prop. A menu was featured on the side screen that included fake menu items such as the "Dua thermadore". The song was followed by "Good In Bed" and "Fever". The former song featured a technicolor barrage of cherries for the backdrop. Lipa attached a white, flowing train to her outfit to perform "Boys Will Be Boys" with a spotlight on her, which led into a Club Future Nostalgia interlude for the third act. The interlude included a bombastic carnaval-like parade with the performers dancing down the runway. Lipa changed into a Marine Serre outfit that included a pink lace bra and black skin-tight jacket alongside matching black high-waisted underwear, sneakers and hot pink tights with the brand's signature crescent moon motif for the third act. For the third act of the European leg, Lipa wore a Dior outfit by John Galliano. The performances for this act took place at the end of the runway stage under low neon lights that looked like a night club. She performed "One Kiss" and "Electricity" with her backup dancers. "Hallucinate" followed where Lipa and her dancers performed warehouse rave-influenced choreography, jumping around a secondary stage in the set. The final song of the third act was "Cold Heart" where Lipa duetted with a pre-recorded video of Elton John while sitting on the stage with her dancers.

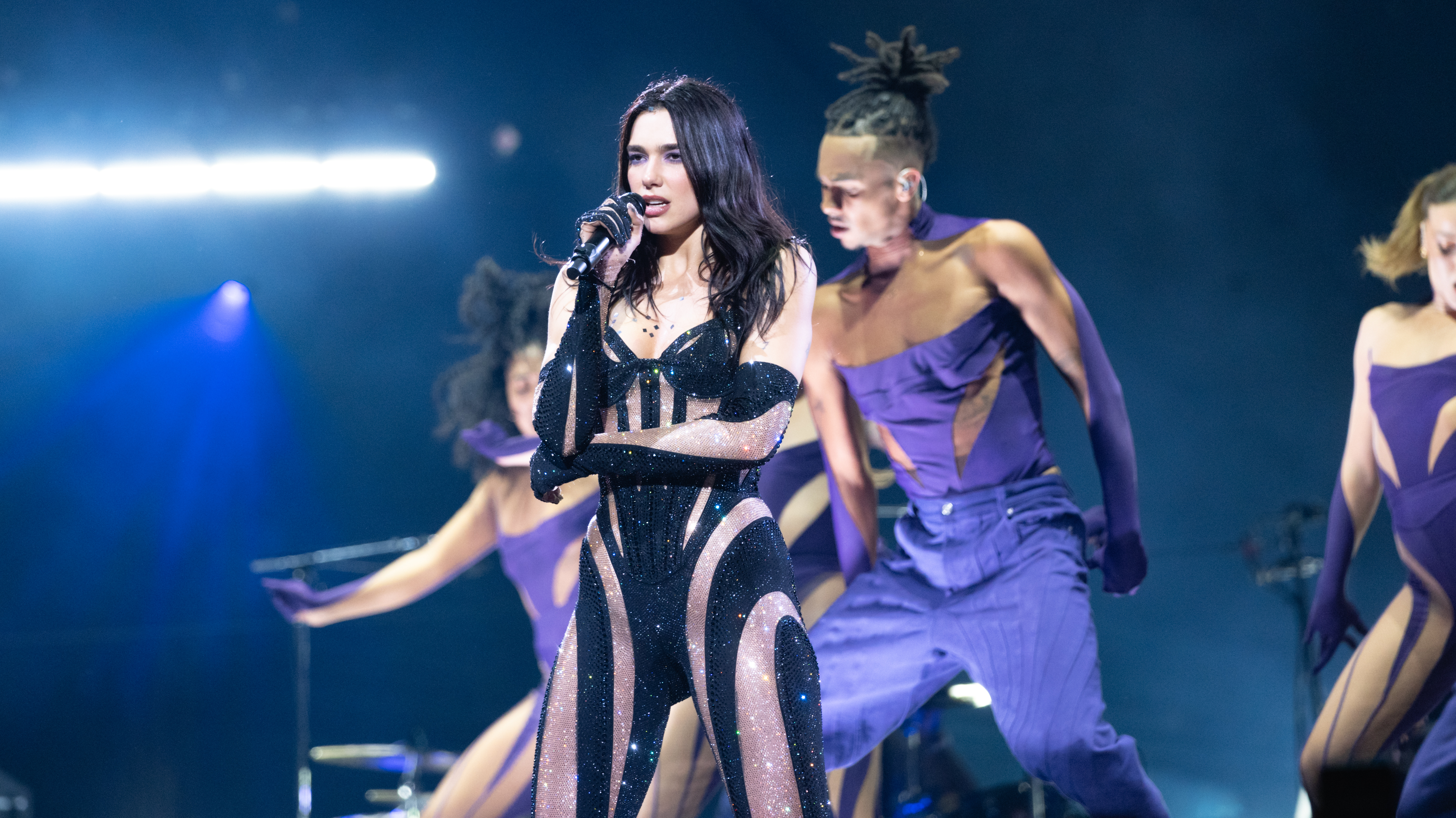
For the encore of the show, Lipa wore a custom Mugler catsuit featuring 120,000 crystals.

In the final act, Lipa wore a sparkling black Mugler catsuit covered in 120,000 crystals with beige mesh cutouts as well as sheer and opaque body-defining panels. The outfit was similar to that of Cher's "If I Could Turn Back Time" outfit, and was paired with matching black gloves. The dancers wore also wore outfits by the fashion house, some in similar body suits to the singer and some with a cut out black top and matching trousers. For this act, a glittering moon and stars were brought down and the singer performed "Levitating" while hovering above the general admission crowd on a moving platform before waving goodbye and running off stage. She was surrounded by hanging iridescent planets and stars with a galaxy image on the big screen. In the encore, the singer belted an aggressive take of the album's title track where she whipped her hair around and walked the runway while teal and dark purple laser lights were used. The show closed with Lipa thanking her opening acts and introducing her band followed by a performance of "Don't Start Now" which opens with the singer reclaiming a dance move she performed during promotion for her eponymous debut studio album that caused her to be bullied online for it being "lazy" and "uninspired" as well as become a meme for the dance. Lipa stated that she looks back at the dance from a different perspective with "fondness" as, although the bullying caused her a lot of grief, it caused her to work harder and grow into the artist she wanted to become. Confetti cannons go off during the performance. The show lasted for approximately 90 minutes. As the audience left the venue, "I Wanna Dance with Somebody (Who Loves Me)" (1987) by Whitney Houston was played over the PA system.

== Critical reception ==
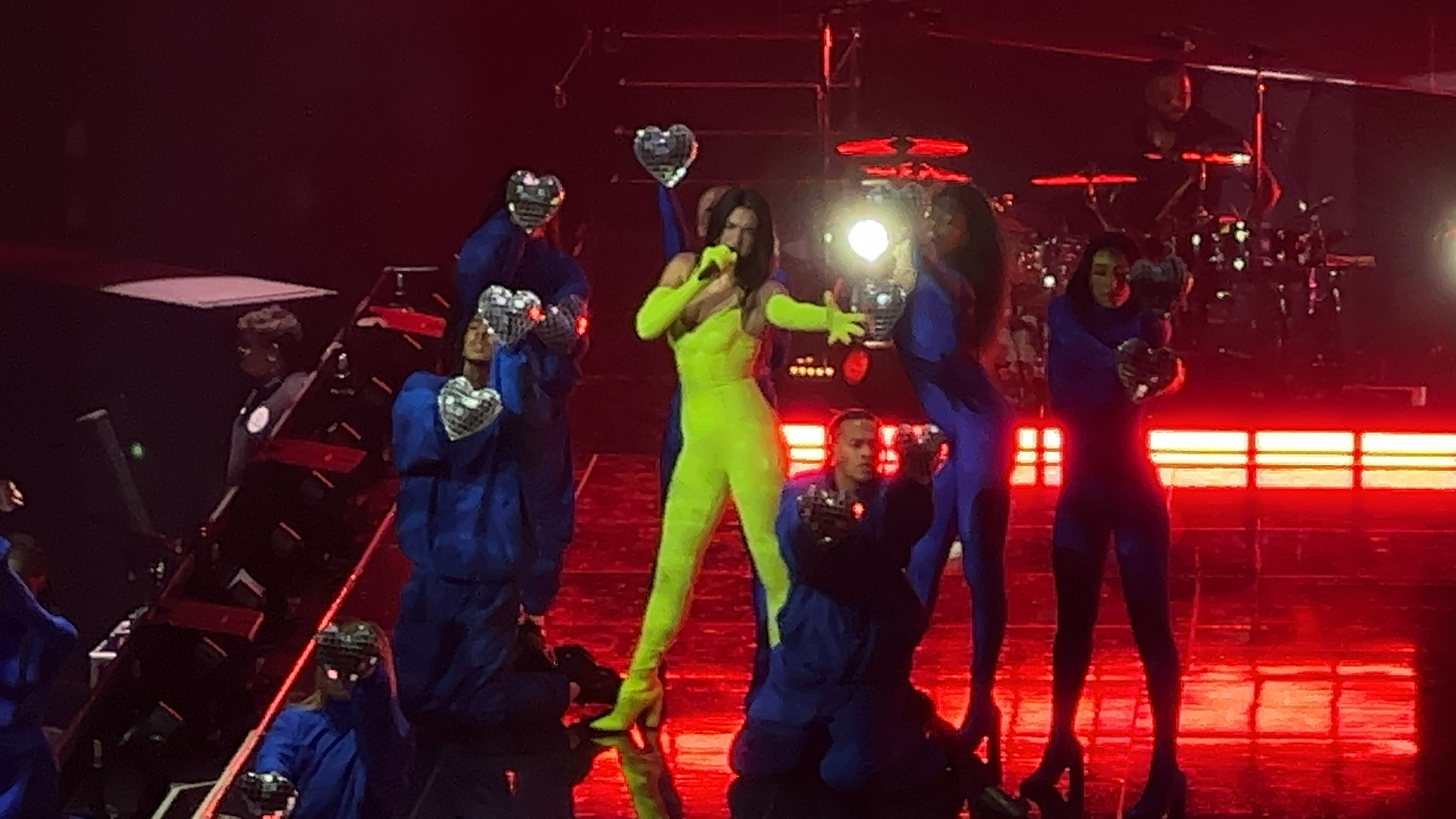
Critics praised Lipa's stage presence and live vocals.

The Future Nostalgia Tour was met with highly positive reviews from critics. E! Online named the tour one of 15 "must-see" concerts in 2022. In a review from Rolling Stone, Celia Almeida praised Lipa's stage presence stating she's a "superstar" that's "every bit the female alpha she proclaimed herself to be on the album's title track" while also mentioning that the show is "a powerful reminder of Lipa's pop savvy". For Consequence, Mary Gibson stated that "Lipa delivered exactly the kind of lively, dynamic show fans have been aching for". Adam Graham of The Detroit News praised the "rich" production that "worked like clockwork" and complimented Lipa's stage presence saying her "confidence and her control of the stage was the best stage trick of the night". The Columbus Dispatch's Margaret Quamme commended the "loose, joyous" choreography that lets the "glossy, admittedly shallow disco-tinged" set list breathe. Emmalyse Brownstein of Miami New Times commended singer's vocals stating they sound "just like her studio recordings" while also praised Lipa's "impressive" stage presence for commanding the stage and leading the dancers. The Tennessean reviewer Dave Paulson praised the concert for being "beyond well-rehearsed, and synchronized down to the millisecond", while also appreciating the singer's stage presence stating she is "self-assured" and "a cool, consistent presence than a diva aiming to set the stage ablaze".

In The Charlotte Observer, Théoden Janes complimented Lipa's performance, which he praised for hitting "pretty much all of her marks" in "terms of her command over her vocals and her command over her body". Edward Pevos of MLive named it "one of the most well-paced shows we've seen many years" while praising Lipa for commanding "the stage like a seasoned pro". Writing for The Oakland Press, Gary Graff said Lipa ticked "off all the boxes we expect from these kinds of shows". Writing for The Boston Globe, Maura Johnston said the show "leaned into that kitchen-sink mode feeling of the present while also offering an escape" while describing Lipa as "a charismatic performer with a striking look" that "commanded the stage". Dan DeLuca of The Philadelphia Inquirer praised the tight choreography and Lipa's "more-than-capable" vocals. In a more negative review from OnMilwaukee, Matt Mueller praised the "spectacle" show production but criticized Lipa's performance and stage presence, saying that at times her backup dancers stole the show.

For Expresso, after Lisbon's show, Rita Carmo, also complimented the show, stating "Don't they make pop stars like they used to? Wrong. Dua Lipa proved tonight, in Lisbon, that she has the fiber of someone who came to stay in a musical territory used to chewing and throwing away. In just over five years, the British artist, of Albanian origin, went from a proposal that was perhaps too alternative to widespread acclaim, achieving the feat of pleasing both the masses and those who look at these pop things with some cynicism".

== Commercial reception ==
Pitchfork named the Future Nostalgia Tour one of the most anticipated tours of 2022. The tour debuted at number five on the February 2022 issue of Billboard's Top Tours Boxscore chart with a total gross of $13,523,248 and a total attendance of 138,638, from 11 shows. The following month, it dropped down to number seven with a total gross of $25,027,606 and a total attendance of 239,855 from 17 shows. The first leg grossed $40,100,000 and sold 394,000 tickets, an increase of 346% in ticket sales and 1,479% in gross-per-show compared to when Lipa toured the US in support of her debut album. In every city except Milwaukee, ticket sales topped 11,000; Milwaukee's Fiserv Forum had a scaled down capacity and only sold 6,312 tickets. The highest grossing show of the leg was the show of 1 March 2022 in New York City grossing $2,100,000 while the following night in Washington D.C. had the highest ticket sales with 16,068 tickets sold. The shows in Inglewood had a gross of $3,228,158 and an attendance of 30,270, causing it to chart at number 29 on the March 2022 issue of Billboard's Top Boxscores chart. On the 2022 Billboard year-end boxscore chart, the Future Nostalgia Tour was ranked the world's 18th highest-grossing tour of the year, grossing $89,302,575 from 71 shows.

== Set list ==
This set list is representative of the show on 9 February 2022 in Miami. It is not representative of all concerts for the duration of the tour.

Act 1

1. "Physical"
2. "New Rules"
3. "Love Again"
4. "Cool"
5. "Pretty Please"
6. "Break My Heart"
7. "Be the One"

Act 2

8. "We're Good"
9. "Good in Bed"
10. "Fever"
11. "Boys Will Be Boys"

Act 3

12. Club Future Nostalgia Medley
13. "One Kiss"
14. "Electricity"
15. "Hallucinate"
16. "Cold Heart"

Act 4

17. "Levitating"

Encore

18. "Future Nostalgia"
19. "Don't Start Now"

=== Notes ===
- Angèle joined Lipa to perform "Fever" at the concerts on 1 March in New York City, 2 and 3 May in London, 15 May in Paris and 9 June in Barcelona.
- "Sweetest Pie" was added to the set list between "Good in Bed" and "Fever" at the concerts on 15, 17, and 20 March 2022 in Denver, Tulsa, and Phoenix, respectively; Megan Thee Stallion joined Lipa to perform the song on all three dates.

== Shows ==
List of concerts
Date (2022)	City	Country	Venue	Opening acts	Attendance	Revenue
9 February	Miami	United States	FTX Arena	Caroline Polachek; Lolo Zouaï	14,557 / 14,557	$1,558,815
11 February	Orlando	United States	Amway Center	Caroline Polachek; Lolo Zouaï	13,611 / 13,611	$1,335,652
12 February	Atlanta	United States	State Farm Arena	Caroline Polachek; Lolo Zouaï	12,110 / 12,110	$1,235,805
14 February	Nashville	United States	Bridgestone Arena	Caroline Polachek; Lolo Zouaï	11,458 / 11,458	$1,073,938
16 February	Charlotte	United States	Spectrum Center	Caroline Polachek; Lolo Zouaï	11,930 / 11,930	$1,049,500
18 February	Boston	United States	TD Garden	Caroline Polachek; Lolo Zouaï	13,941 / 13,941	$1,471,026
19 February	Philadelphia	United States	Wells Fargo Center	Caroline Polachek; Lolo Zouaï	14,019 / 14,019	$1,445,941
21 February	Elmont (Note: Promoted as Belmont Park)	United States	UBS Arena	Caroline Polachek; Lolo Zouaï	13,736 / 13,736	$1,209,755
23 February	Milwaukee	United States	Fiserv Forum	Caroline Polachek; Lolo Zouaï	6,312 / 6,312	$572,936
25 February	Detroit	United States	Little Caesars Arena	Caroline Polachek; Lolo Zouaï	13,114 / 13,114	$1,278,918
26 February	Columbus	United States	Schottenstein Center	Caroline Polachek; Lolo Zouaï	13,850 / 13,850	$1,290,961
1 March	New York City	United States	Madison Square Garden	Caroline Polachek; Lolo Zouaï	15,461 / 15,461	$2,054,407
2 March	Washington, D.C.	United States	Capital One Arena	Caroline Polachek; Lolo Zouaï	16,068 / 16,068	$1,652,588
4 March	Newark	United States	Prudential Center	Caroline Polachek; Lolo Zouaï	14,480 / 14,480	$1,613,984
5 March	Buffalo	United States	KeyBank Center	Caroline Polachek; Lolo Zouaï	11,685 / 11,685	$957,124
8 March	Minneapolis	United States	Target Center	Caroline Polachek; Lolo Zouaï	11,987 / 11,987	$1,060,862
9 March	Chicago	United States	United Center	Caroline Polachek; Lolo Zouaï	15,880 / 15,880	$1,781,908
12 March	Houston	United States	Toyota Center	Caroline Polachek; Lolo Zouaï	12,889 / 12,889	$1,470,541
13 March	Dallas	United States	American Airlines Center	Caroline Polachek; Lolo Zouaï	15,018 / 15,018	$1,563,038
15 March	Denver	United States	Ball Arena	Megan Thee Stallion; Caroline Polachek	13,420 / 13,420	$1,511,817
17 March	Tulsa	United States	BOK Center	Megan Thee Stallion; Caroline Polachek	11,399 / 11,399	$1,021,952
20 March	Phoenix	United States	Footprint Center	Megan Thee Stallion; Caroline Polachek	14,030 / 14,030	$1,385,791
22 March	Inglewood (Note: Promoted as Los Angeles)	United States	The Forum	Caroline Polachek; Lolo Zouaï	30,270 / 30,270	$3,228,153
23 March	Inglewood	United States	The Forum	Caroline Polachek; Lolo Zouaï	30,270 / 30,270	$3,228,153
25 March	Paradise (Note: Promoted as Las Vegas)	United States	T-Mobile Arena	Caroline Polachek; Lolo Zouaï	15,812 / 15,812	$1,582,420
27 March	San Jose	United States	SAP Center	Lolo Zouaï (Note: Caroline Polachek cancelled her appearances at the shows on 27 March 29 March 31 March, and 1 April 2022 in San Jose, Portland, Seattle, and Vancouver, respectively, after she was hospitalized due to an ankle injury and unable to walk.)	13,619 / 13,619	$1,499,676
29 March	Portland	United States	Moda Center	Lolo Zouaï	12,560 / 12,560	$1,097,984
31 March	Seattle	United States	Climate Pledge Arena	Lolo Zouaï	15,277 / 15,277	$1,545,361
1 April	Vancouver	Canada	Rogers Arena	Lolo Zouaï	15,332 / 15,332	$1,548,489
15 April (Note: The concert on 15 April 2022 in Manchester was previously scheduled for 1 June 2020, 21 January 2021, and 16 September 2021, being rescheduled due to the COVID-19 pandemic.)	Manchester	England	AO Arena	Griff	15,609 / 15,609	$904,584
17 April (Note: The concert on 17 April 2022 in Birmingham was previously scheduled for 10 June 2020, 13 January 2021, and 28 September 2021, being rescheduled due to the COVID-19 pandemic.)	Birmingham	England	Utilita Arena	Griff	14,353 / 14,353	$897,522
18 April (Note: The concert on 18 April 2022 in Leeds was previously scheduled for 4 June 2020, 22 January 2021, and 21 September 2021, being rescheduled due to the COVID-19 pandemic.)	Leeds	England	First Direct Arena	Griff	12,477 / 12,477	$728,682
20 April (Note: The concert on 20 April 2022 in Dublin was previously scheduled for 18 June 2020, 8 January 2021, and 18 September 2021, being rescheduled due to the COVID-19 pandemic.)	Dublin	Ireland	3Arena	Griff	28,371 / 28,371	$2,382,420
21 April (Note: The concert on 21 April 2022 in Dublin was previously scheduled for 19 June 2020, 9 January 2021, and 19 September 2021, being rescheduled due to the COVID-19 pandemic.)	Dublin	Ireland	3Arena	Griff	28,371 / 28,371	$2,382,420
23 April (Note: The concert on 23 April 2022 in Newcastle was previously scheduled for 13 June 2020, 3 January 2021, and 13 September 2021, being rescheduled due to the COVID-19 pandemic.)	Newcastle	England	Utilita Arena	Griff	10,041 / 10,041	$888,742
24 April (Note: The concert on 24 April 2022 in Glasgow was previously scheduled for 15 June 2020, 4 January 2021, and 11 September 2021, being rescheduled due to the COVID-19 pandemic.)	Glasgow	Scotland	OVO Hydro	Griff	13,282 / 13,871	$852,960
26 April (Note: The concert on 26 April 2022 in Nottingham was previously scheduled for 30 May 2020, 12 January 2021, and 27 September 2021, being rescheduled due to the COVID-19 pandemic.)	Nottingham	England	Motorpoint Arena Nottingham	Griff	8,099 / 8,099	$453,116
27 April (Note: The concert on 27 April 2022 in Cardiff was previously scheduled for 7 June 2020, 19 January 2021, and 15 September 2021, being rescheduled due to the COVID-19 pandemic.)	Cardiff	Wales	Motorpoint Arena Cardiff	Griff	9,042 / 9,042	$616,655
29 April (Note: The concert on 29 April 2022 in Liverpool was previously scheduled for 29 May 2020, 6 January 2021, and 10 September 2021, being rescheduled due to the COVID-19 pandemic.)	Liverpool	England	M&S Bank Arena	Griff	10,698 / 10,698	$563,299
2 May (Note: The concert on 2 May 2022 in London was previously scheduled for 26 May 2020, 15 January 2021, and 24 September 2021, being rescheduled due to the COVID-19 pandemic.)	London	England	The O_{2} Arena	Griff; Angèle	39,030 / 39,300	$2,441,870
3 May (Note: The concert on 3 May 2022 in London was previously scheduled for 27 May 2020, 16 January 2021, and 25 September 2021, being rescheduled due to the COVID-19 pandemic.)	London	England	The O_{2} Arena	Griff; Angèle	39,030 / 39,300	$2,441,870
6 May (Note: The concert on 6 May 2022 in Antwerp was previously scheduled for 2 May 2020, 4 February 2021, and 1 October 2021, being rescheduled due to the COVID-19 pandemic.)	Antwerp	Belgium	Sportpaleis	Griff	42,550 / 42,550	$2,241,927
7 May	Antwerp	Belgium	Sportpaleis	Griff	42,550 / 42,550	$2,241,927
9 May (Note: The concert on 9 May 2022 in Hamburg was previously scheduled for 15 May 2020, 25 January 2021, and 3 October 2021, being rescheduled due to the COVID-19 pandemic.)	Hamburg	Germany	Barclays Arena	Griff	12,117 / 12,117	$752,236
10 May (Note: The concert on 10 May 2022 in Berlin was previously scheduled for 17 May 2020, 26 January 2021, and 9 October 2021, being rescheduled due to the COVID-19 pandemic.)	Berlin	Germany	Mercedes-Benz Arena	Griff	14,051 / 14,051	$895,575
12 May (Note: The concert on 12 May 2022 in Cologne was previously scheduled for 5 May 2020, 27 January 2021, and 7 October 2021, being rescheduled due to the COVID-19 pandemic.)	Cologne	Germany	Lanxess Arena	Griff	16,703 / 17,000	$963,595
15 May (Note: The concert on 15 May 2022 in Paris was previously scheduled for 4 May 2020, 8 February 2021, and 30 September 2021, being rescheduled due to the COVID-19 pandemic.)	Paris	France	Accor Arena	Griff; Angèle	17,001 / 17,001	$850,191
17 May (Note: The concert on 17 May 2022 in Amsterdam was previously scheduled for 7 May 2020, 3 February 2021, and 5 October 2021, being rescheduled due to the COVID-19 pandemic.)	Amsterdam	Netherlands	Ziggo Dome	Griff	33,642 / 33,642	$1,699,256
18 May	Amsterdam	Netherlands	Ziggo Dome	Griff	33,642 / 33,642	$1,699,256
20 May	Zürich	Switzerland	Hallenstadion	Griff	14,025 / 14,025	$917,768
22 May (Note: The concert on 22 May 2022 in Munich was previously scheduled for 20 May 2020, being rescheduled due to the COVID-19 pandemic.)	Munich	Germany	Olympiahalle	Griff	13,343 / 13,343	$717,595
23 May (Note: The concert on 23 May 2022 in Vienna was previously scheduled for 19 May 2020, being rescheduled due to the COVID-19 pandemic.)	Vienna	Austria	Wiener Stadthalle	Griff	13,679 / 13,679	$730,051
25 May (Note: The concert on 25 May 2022 in Milan was previously scheduled for 30 April 2020, 10 February 2021, and 12 October 2021, being rescheduled due to the COVID-19 pandemic.)	Assago (Note: Promoted as Milan.)	Italy	Mediolanum Forum	Griff	23,119 / 23,119	$982,013
26 May	Assago	Italy	Mediolanum Forum	Griff	23,119 / 23,119	$982,013
28 May	Casalecchio di Reno (Note: Promoted as Bologna.)	Italy	Unipol Arena	Griff	14,286 / 14,286	$708,702
30 May	Lyon	France	Halle Tony Garnier	Griff	11,862 / 11,862	$670,558
1 June (Note: The concert on 1 June 2022 in Barcelona was previously scheduled for 28 April 2020, 14 February 2021, and 15 October 2021, being rescheduled due to the COVID-19 pandemic.)	Barcelona	Spain	Palau Sant Jordi	Griff	18,342 / 18,342	$915,141
3 June (Note: The concert on 3 June 2022 in Madrid was previously scheduled for 26 April 2020, 16 February 2021, and 17 October 2021, being rescheduled due to the COVID-19 pandemic.)	Madrid	Spain	WiZink Center	Griff	16,976 / 16,976	$897,714
5 June	Braga	Portugal	Altice Forum	Griff	10,481 / 10,481	$560,288
6 June	Lisbon	Portugal	Altice Arena	Griff	18,758 / 18,758	$933,470
9 June (Note: This concert was a part of Primavera Sound.)	Barcelona	Spain	Parc del Fòrum	—N/a		
11 June (Note: This concert was a part of Love Stream Festival.)	Bratislava	Slovakia	Tehelné pole	—N/a		
19 June (Note: The concert on 19 June 2022 in Kaunas was previously scheduled for 21 June 2022, being rescheduled due to an unforeseen scheduling conflict.)	Kaunas	Lithuania	Žalgiris Arena	DJ Jovani (Note: Originally, Tove Lo was supposed to be the opening act. However, it was learned several hours before the show that DJ Jovani would be the opening act instead with no reasons stated.)	15,656 / 15,656	$1,107,464
26 June (Note: When the tour was initially postponed, the shows in Oslo and Stockholm were formally cancelled after they were unable to be rescheduled, with tickets being completely refunded. When the tour was pushed back to 2022, new shows in the cities were announced where attendees needed to buy new tickets.)	Oslo	Norway	Oslo Spektrum	Tove Lo	10,051 / 10,051	$818,464
28 June	Stockholm	Sweden	Gröna Lund	—N/a		
30 June (Note: This concert was a part of Roskilde Festival.)	Roskilde	Denmark	Roskilde Dyrskueplads	—N/a		
25 July (Note: The concert on 25 July 2022 in Montreal was previously scheduled for 22 February 2022, being rescheduled due to the COVID-19 pandemic.)	Montreal	Canada	Bell Centre	Caroline Polachek; Lolo Zouaï	16,135 / 16,135	$1,496,834
27 July (Note: The concert on 27 July 2022 in Toronto was previously scheduled for 23 February 2022, being rescheduled due to the COVID-19 pandemic.)	Toronto	Canada	Scotiabank Arena	Caroline Polachek; Lolo Zouaï	15,880 / 15,880	$1,531,634
29 July (Note: The concert on 29 July 2022 in Chicago is part of Lollapalooza.)	Chicago	United States	Grant Park	—N/a		
31 July (Note: The concert on 31 July 2022 in Montreal is part of Osheaga Festival.)	Montreal	Canada	Parc Jean-Drapeau	—N/a		
4 August (Note: This concert was a part of Sunny Hill Festival.)	Pristina	Kosovo	Germia Park	—N/a		
10 August (Note: This concert was a part of Sziget Festival.)	Budapest	Hungary	Óbudai-sziget	—N/a		
8 September	São Paulo	Brazil	Arena Anhembi	Vickilicious	35,388 / 35,388	$2,730,187
11 September (Note: This concert was a part of Rock in Rio.)	Rio de Janeiro	Brazil	Barra Olympic Park	—N/a		
13 September (Note: The concerts in Buenos Aires on 13 and 14 September were originally scheduled to take place on the Hipódromo Argentino de Palermo, but were moved due to high demand.)	Buenos Aires	Argentina	Campo Argentino de Polo	Vickilicious	110,100 / 110,100	$6,531,601
14 September	Buenos Aires	Argentina	Campo Argentino de Polo	Vickilicious	110,100 / 110,100	$6,531,601
16 September	Santiago	Chile	Estadio Bicentenario	Vickilicious; DJ Polach	28,052 / 28,052	$2,060,731
18 September	Bogotá	Colombia	Salitre Mágico	Vickilicious	31,981 / 31,981	$2,154,428
21 September	Mexico City	Mexico	Foro Sol	Vickilicious	64,267 / 64,267	$4,012,783
23 September	Monterrey	Mexico	Estadio Banorte	Vickilicious	21,731 / 21,731	$2,110,522
25 September (Note: This concert was a part of Firefly Music Festival.)	Dover	United States	The Woodlands of Dover International Speedway	—N/a		
2 November	Auckland	New Zealand	Spark Arena	Tkay Maidza	23,565 / 24,097	$2,284,500
3 November	Auckland	New Zealand	Spark Arena	Tkay Maidza	23,565 / 24,097	$2,284,500
5 November	Brisbane	Australia	Brisbane Entertainment Centre	Tkay Maidza	11,568 / 11,568	$1,183,684
8 November	Sydney	Australia	Qudos Bank Arena	Tkay Maidza	33,195 / 33,195	$3,087,940
9 November	Sydney	Australia	Qudos Bank Arena	Tkay Maidza	33,195 / 33,195	$3,087,940
11 November	Melbourne	Australia	Rod Laver Arena	Tkay Maidza	28,360 / 28,360	$2,898,216
12 November	Melbourne	Australia	Rod Laver Arena	Tkay Maidza	28,360 / 28,360	$2,898,216
14 November	Adelaide	Australia	Adelaide Entertainment Centre	Tkay Maidza	8,945 / 8,945	$915,388
16 November	Perth	Australia	RAC Arena	Tkay Maidza	14,828 / 14,828	$1,457,119
28 November	Tirana	Albania	Skanderbeg Square	Elvana Gjata	200,000	Free entry

=== Cancelled shows ===
List of cancelled concerts
Date	City	Country	Venue	Reason	Ref.
10 May 2020	Copenhagen	Denmark	Royal Arena	COVID-19 pandemic in Europe	
12 May 2020	Stockholm	Sweden	Avicii Arena	COVID-19 pandemic in Europe	
13 May 2020	Oslo	Norway	Oslo Spektrum	COVID-19 pandemic in Europe	
23 June 2022 (Note: Due to sanctions pertaining to the Russian invasion of Ukraine, the concert on 23 June 2022 in Helsinki was planned to be moved to a venue alternate to the Hartwall Arena. After a replacement was unable to be found, the concert was cancelled.)	Helsinki	Finland	Hartwall Arena	Russian invasion of Ukraine	
1 July 2022 (Note: The concert on 1 July 2022 in Gdynia was supposed to be a part of Open'er Festival. Lipa arrived in Gdynia, but the festival was suspended due to severe storm and all the present people were evacuated. After a few hours, the festival was resumed, but several performances, including Lipa's, were cancelled.)	Gdynia	Poland	Gdynia-Kosakowo Airport	Inclement weather	

== Personnel ==
Credits adapted from DublinLive, Dincwear and the BIMM Institute.

Band:

- Dua Lipa – lead vocals
- Georgie Ward – keyboards
- Duayne Sanford – drums
- Matty Carroll – bass
- Alex Lanyon – guitar
- Ciara O'Connor – backing vocals
- Izzy Chase – backing vocals
- Naomi Scarlett – backing vocals
- Matt Maijah – backing vocals

Dancers:

- Sharon June – dance captain
- Zacc Milne – dancer
- Sammi Lee Jayne – dancer
- Demi Rox – dancer
- Robyn Rae Laud – dancer
- Fatou Bah – dancer
- Didde-mie Lykke From – dancer
- Lamaar Manning – dancer
- Kane Horn – dancer
- Thanh Jason Nguyen – dancer
- Darion Reyes – roller skater
- Bobby West – roller skater
- Shawarah Battles - swing (US leg only)
- Denzel Chisolm - swing (US leg only)
- Alex Clark - swing (Europe leg onwards)
- Ben Hukin - swing (Europe leg onwards)

== See also ==
- Studio 2054
