= Machell =

Machell is a surname. Notable people with the surname include:

- Charlie Machell (born 1994), English footballer
- James Machell (born 1994), English writer (contributor to Sci Phi Journal and The Encyclopedia of Science Fiction)
- Ben Machell, English journalist (feature writer for The Times)
- Tom Machell (born 1990), actor and writer
- James Octavius Machell (1837–1902), British Racehorse Trainer
- John Machell (1637–1704), English Politician

== See also ==
- Machel
