= Sunny Hill Festival =

Annual music festival in Pristina, Kosovo

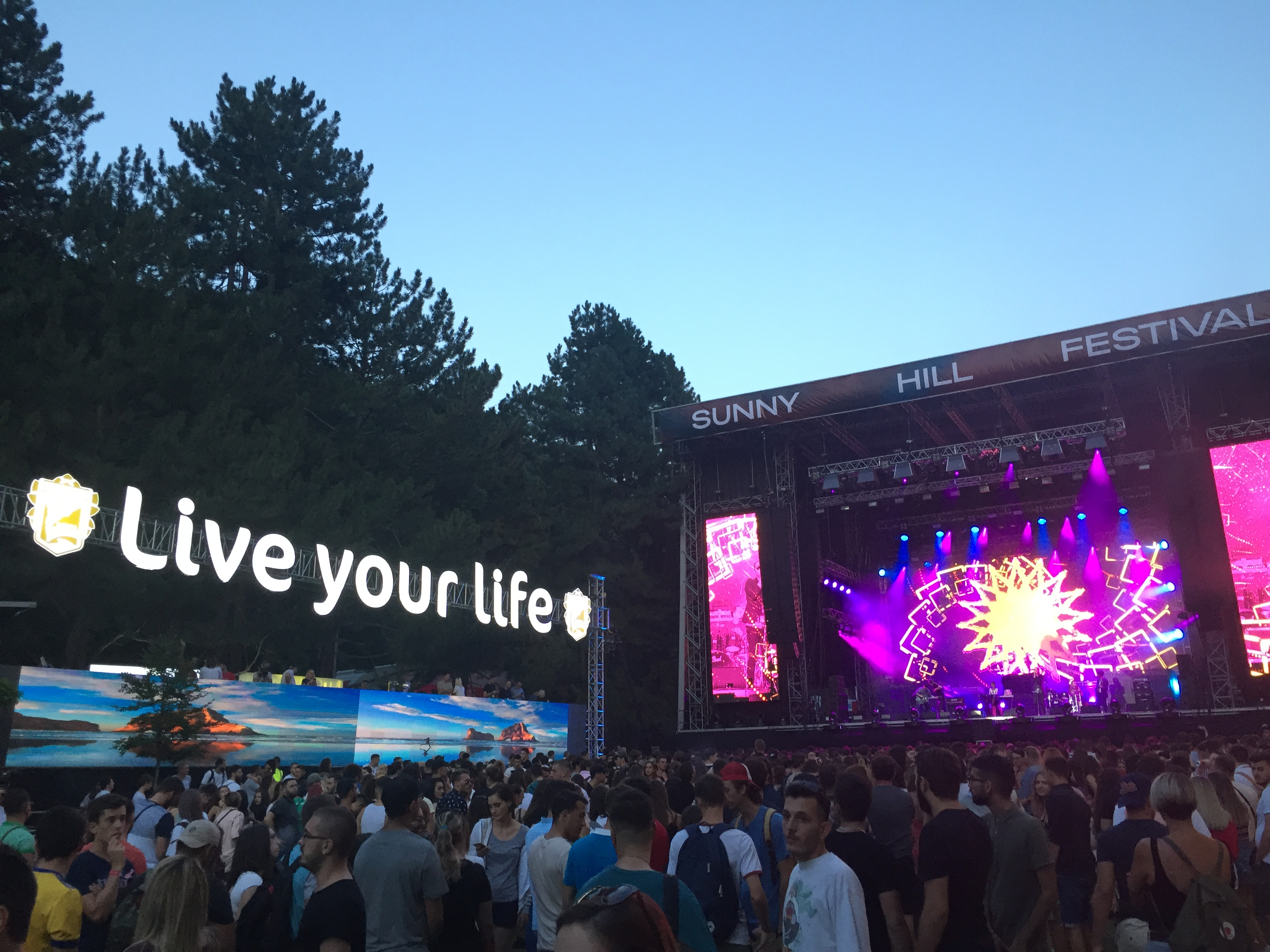
- 2018 Sunny Hill Festival
- Genre: Performing arts festival
- Frequency: Annually
- Locations: Sunny Hill Festival Park (Pristina, Kosovo)
- Coordinates: 42.70785312°N 21.12538523°E
- Years active: 2018–2019, 2022, 2024–present
- Inaugurated: 10 August 2018
- Founder: Dukagjin and Dua Lipa
- Most recent: 31 July – 2 August 2026
- Next event: July/August 2027
- Organiser: Sunny Hill Foundation
- Website: sunnyhillfestival.com

The Sunny Hill Festival is an annual international music festival in Pristina, Kosovo, organised by English-Kosovan singer Dua Lipa and her father Dukagjin Lipa. It has established itself as the largest music festival in Kosovo.

== History ==
=== 2018–2019 ===
The Sunny Hill Festival was organised by English singer Dua Lipa and her father Dukagjin Lipa to raise money for the Pristina-based Sunny Hill Foundation charity organisation.

The inaugural edition of the festival took place from 10 to 12 August 2018 at the Germia Park in Pristina, and was headlined by Dua Lipa, Martin Garrix, and Action Bronson. Her father also performed with his band, ODA, and belonged to another line-up alongside many artists from Kosovo and Albania.

The festival's second edition took place from 2 to 4 August 2019, headlined by Miley Cyrus, Calvin Harris, and Gashi.

=== 2020–2022 ===
After forcibly taking a break in 2020 and 2021 due to the COVID-19 pandemic, the festival returned in 2022. Since 2019, organisers had been advocating for a larger space to expand the festival. Procedural issues delayed securing a new location, and by June of that year, state institutions and organisers had not reached an agreement, leading to an announcement of the festival's potential move to Tirana, Albania.

After significant public pressure, a consensus was reached with the government and the municipality of Pristina. As a result, the festival was once again held at Germia Park from 4 to 7 August 2022, with plans to continue working on a permanent location for future editions. This announcement was followed with criticism due to the legal status of the as a protected landscape and concerns for pollution. In addition to the festival in Pristina, a separate festival with a different lineup would be hosted in Tirana from 26 to 28 August. The Pristina event was headlined by Dua Lipa, J Balvin, Diplo, and Skepta, while the Tirana event was headlined by Action Bronson, Stormzy, and Hardwell. That year's festival theme was a call for visa liberalization for Kosovo under the slogan "Set Me Free."

=== 2023–present ===
After the complications of the previous year, the 2023 festival was cancelled while the organisers looked for a permanent location. In 2024, the festival moved to the Sunny Hill Festival Park in the Bërnicë e Epërme village of Pristina, its new permanent location. It was held from 25 to 28 July, and headlined by Bebe Rexha, Burna Boy, Stormzy, DJ Snake, Black Coffee, The Martinez Brothers, Groove Armada, and The Blaze.

The 2025 edition of the festival was held from 1 to 3 August, with headliners including Dua Lipa and Peggy Gou. Katy Perry, Lewis Capaldi, and Martin Garrix headlined the 2026 edition, which took place from 31 July to 2 August.

== Festival summary by year ==
Edition	Year	Location	Dates	Headliners
1st	2018	Germia Park (Pristina, Kosovo)	10–12 August	Dua Lipa; Martin Garrix; Action Bronson
2nd	2019	Germia Park (Pristina, Kosovo)	2–4 August	Miley Cyrus; Calvin Harris; Gashi
—N/a	2020	Cancelled due to the COVID-19 pandemic.		
—N/a	2021	Cancelled due to the COVID-19 pandemic.		
3rd	2022	Germia Park (Pristina, Kosovo)	4–7 August	Dua Lipa; J Balvin; Diplo; Skepta
3rd	2022	Artificial Lake Park (Tirana, Albania)	26–28 August	Action Bronson; Stormzy; Hardwell
—N/a	2023	Cancelled while event organisers looked for a permanent location.		
4th	2024	Sunny Hill Festival Park (Pristina, Kosovo)	25–28 July	Bebe Rexha; Burna Boy; Stormzy; DJ Snake; Black Coffee; The Martinez Brothers; Groove Armada; The Blaze
5th	2025	Sunny Hill Festival Park (Pristina, Kosovo)	1–3 August	Dua Lipa; Shawn Mendes; Peggy Gou; Edis
6th	2026	Sunny Hill Festival Park (Pristina, Kosovo)	31 July–2 August	Katy Perry; Lewis Capaldi; Martin Garrix; PAWSA
