= Children's rights movement =

Social movement

The Children's Rights Movement is a historical and modern movement committed to the acknowledgment, expansion, and/or regression of the rights of children around the world. This act laid several constitutional laws for the growth of a child's mental and physical health. (Not to be confused with Youth rights). It began in the early part of the last century and has been an effort by government organizations, advocacy groups, academics, lawyers, lawmakers, and judges to construct a system of laws and policies that enhance and protect the lives of children. While the historical definition of child has varied, the United Nations Convention on the Rights of the Child asserts that "A child is any human being below the age of eighteen years, unless under the law applicable to the child, majority is attained earlier." There are no definitions of other terms used to describe young people such as "adolescents", "teenagers" or "youth" in international law.

Children’s rights have existed in various forms since the mid-19th century, when early social reform movements began to challenge widespread child labor and advocate for the protection, welfare, and education of children. Traditional attitudes towards children tended to consider them as mere extensions of the household and 'owned' by their parents and/or legal guardian, who exerted absolute parental control.

Views began to change during the Enlightenment, when tradition was increasingly challenged and the value of individual autonomy and natural rights began to be asserted.

The Foundling Hospital in London was founded in 1741 as a children's home for the "education and maintenance of exposed and deserted young children". Thomas Spence, an English political radical wrote the first modern defence of the natural rights of children in The Rights of Infants, published in 1796.

== Social reform ==
With the onset of the Industrial Revolution, children as young as six began to be employed in the factories and coal mines in often inhumane conditions with long hours and little pay. During the early 19th century this exploitation began to attract growing opposition. The terrible conditions of the poor urban children was exposed to liberal middle-class opinion, notably by the author Charles Dickens in his novel Oliver Twist. Social reformers, such as the Lord Shaftesbury, began to mount a vigorous campaign against this practice.

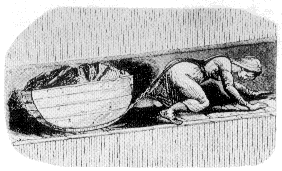
The use of child labour increased during the Industrial Revolution, and became a rallying cry for social reformers.

Ameliorating legislation was achieved with a series of Factory Acts passed during the 19th century, where working hours for children were limited and they were no longer permitted to work during the night. Children younger than nine were not allowed to work and those between 9 and 16 were limited to 16 hours per day. Factories were also required to provide education to the apprentices in reading, writing and arithmetic for the first four years.

An influential social reformer was Mary Carpenter, who campaigned on behalf of neglected children who had turned to juvenile delinquency. In 1851 she proposed the establishment of three types of schools; free day schools for the general population, industrial schools for those in need and reformatory schools for young offenders. She was consulted by the drafters of educational bills, and she was invited to give evidence before House of Commons committees. In 1852 she established a reformatory school at Bristol.

In the United States, the Children's Rights Movement began with the orphan train. In the big cities, when a child's parents died or were extremely poor, the child frequently had to go to work to support himself and/or his family. Boys generally became factory or coal workers, and girls became prostitutes or saloon girls, or else went to work in a sweat shop. All of these jobs paid only starvation wages.

In 1852, Massachusetts required children to attend school. In 1853, Charles Brace founded the Children's Aid Society, which worked hard to take street children in. The following year, the children were placed on a train headed for the West, where they were adopted, and often given work. By 1929, the orphan train stopped running altogether, but its principles lived on.

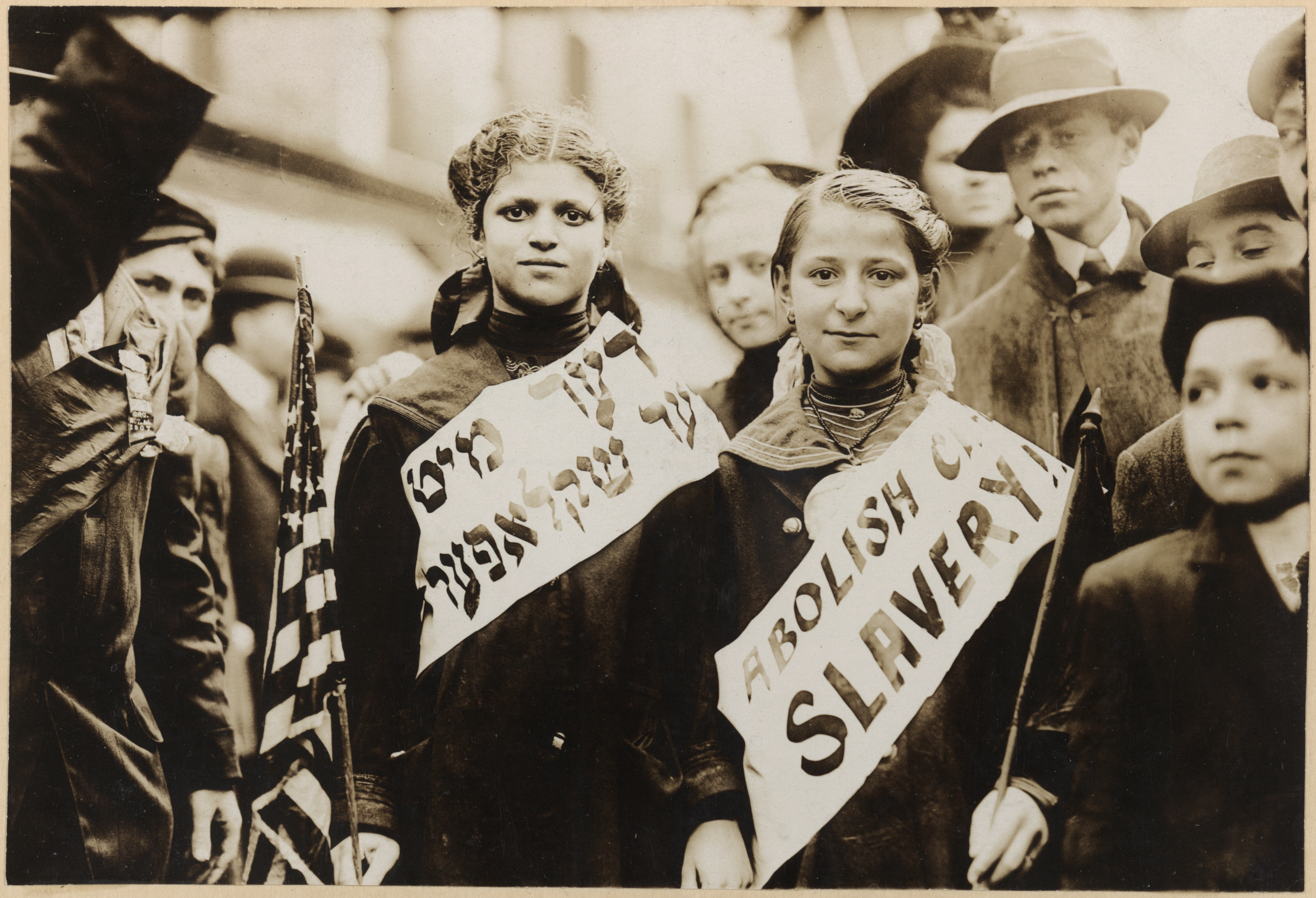
Youth activists in the United States in the early 1900s.

The National Child Labor Committee, an organization dedicated to the abolition of all child labor, was formed in the 1890s. It managed to pass one law, which was struck down by the Supreme Court two years later for violating a child's right to contract his work. In 1924, Congress attempted to pass a constitutional amendment that would authorize a national child labor law. This measure was blocked, and the bill was eventually dropped. It took the Great Depression to end child labor nationwide; adults had become so desperate for jobs that they would work for the same wage as children. In 1938, President Franklin D. Roosevelt signed the Fair Labor Standards Act which, amongst other things, placed limits on many forms of child labor.

The Polish educationalist Janusz Korczak wrote of the rights of children in his book How to Love a Child (Warsaw, 1919); a later book was entitled The Child's Right to Respect (Warsaw, 1929). In 1917, following the Russian Revolution, the Moscow branch of the organization Proletkult produced a Declaration of Children's Rights.

== Rights of the Child ==
The first formal charter to set out the rights of children was drafted by British social reformer Eglantyne Jebb in 1923. Jebb founded Save the Children in 1919, one of the first charities aimed at the young, to help alleviate the starvation of children in Germany and Austria-Hungary during the Allied blockade of Germany in World War I which continued after the Armistice.

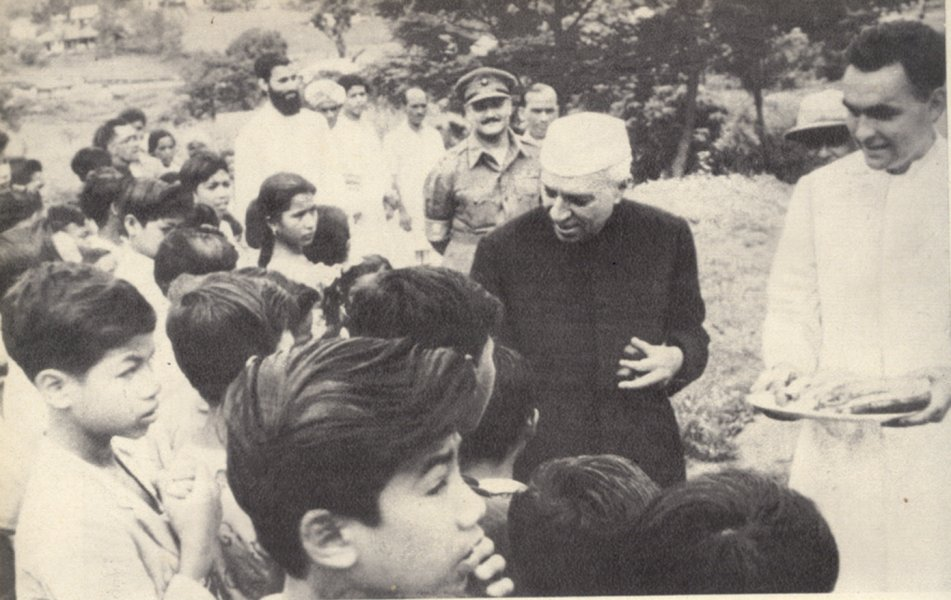
Nehru distributes sweets to children on Children's Day in India.

Her experiences there and later in Russia, led her to believe that the rights of a child needed be especially protected and enforced, and her stipulations consisted of the following criteria:

1. The child must be given the means requisite for its normal development, both materially and spiritually.
2. The child that is hungry must be fed, the child that is sick must be nursed, the child that is backward must be helped, the delinquent child must be reclaimed, and the orphan and the waif must be sheltered and succored.
3. The child must be the first to receive relief in times of distress.
4. The child must be put in a position to earn a livelihood, and must be protected against every form of exploitation.
5. The child must be brought up in the consciousness that its talents must be devoted to the service of its fellow men.

This manifesto was adopted by the International Save the Children Union and endorsed by the League of Nations General Assembly in 1924 as the World Child Welfare Charter. In 1925, the first International Child Welfare Congress was held in Geneva, where the Declaration was widely discussed and supported by organisations and governments.

== Declaration of the Rights of the Child ==
The SCIU also pressed the newly formed United Nations in 1946 to adopt the World Child Welfare Charter. This was achieved in 1959, when the United Nations General Assembly adopted an expanded version as the Declaration of the Rights of the Child. Its main provisions are:

- protection rights: the right to be protected against maltreatment and neglect, the right to be protected from all forms of exploitation
- provision rights: the right to food and to health care, the right to education, the right to benefit from social security
- participation rights: the right to act in certain circumstances and the right to be involved in decision-making

From the formation of the United Nations to the present day, the Children's Rights Movement has become global in focus. Children around the world still suffer from forced child labor, genital mutilation, military service, and sex trafficking. Several international organizations have rallied to the assistance of children. These include Save the Children, Free the Children, and the Children's Defense Fund.

The Child Rights Information Network, or CRIN, formed in 1983, is a group of 1,600 non-governmental organizations from around the world which advocate for the implementation of the Convention on the Rights of the Child. Organizations report on their countries' progress towards implementation, as do governments that have ratified the convention. Every 5 years reporting to the United Nations Committee on the Rights of the Child is required for governments.

== Children's rights by country ==
Many countries have created an institute of children's rights commissioner or ombudsman, the first being Norway in 1981. Others include India, Finland, Sweden, and Ukraine, which was the first country worldwide to install a child in that post in 2005.

=== Argentina ===
In 2005, in order to implement the UN Convention on the Rights of the Child, national Law for the Integral Protection of Children and Adolescents was enacted. This not only allows for protective measures for children, but also created the groundwork for a juvenile justice system. This system allows for children to be integrated back into society and established tactics to protect children from abuse and exploitation.

=== Australia ===
Australia is a participant to all significant treaties that impact on children's rights. The rights and protection of children are governed by both Federal and state and territory law.

=== Brazil ===
Brazil is a founding member of the UN and a signatory of the Universal Declaration of Human Rights, which was adopted by General Assembly resolution in 1948. The Universal Declaration of the Rights of the Child emphasizes that motherhood and childhood are entitled to special care and that children born out of wedlock are allowed the same social protection. In 1990, Brazil approved the UN Convention on the Rights of the Child and fully incorporated it onto Brazil's positive law.

=== China ===
China has ratified many international documents with regard to children's rights protection, including the 1989 Convention on Rights of the Child, the Optional Protocol to the Convention on Rights of Child on the Sale of Children, Child Prostitution, and Child Pornography 2000, the Worst Forms of Child Labor Convention 1999, and The Hague Convention on the Protection of Children and Cooperation in Respect of Intercountry Adoption 1993.

=== France ===
France is in cooperation with all the major treaties dealing with children rights. It has in place several mechanisms to monitor the implementation of the 1989 Convention on the Rights of the Child, in particular, an ombudsman for children.

=== Germany ===
Germany is in agreement with the global conventions that protect the rights of the child. However, Germany prefers to interpret these according to the principles of European agreements, specifically the European Human Rights Convention and also in accordance with German Constitutional guarantees.

=== Greece ===
Greece has various laws and a number of measures and services to promote and advance the rights of children. In 2002, the Greek Parliament adopted a new law on human trafficking; in 2003 the juvenile system was reformed; in 2006 an additional law was created to combat intra-family violence which states a prohibition of corporal punishment of children.

=== Ireland ===
In 2015, the Republic of Ireland outlawed corporal punishment on children.

=== United States ===
There is a long history of children's rights in the U.S.^{[20]} Many children's rights advocates in the U.S. today advocate for a smaller agenda than their international peers. According to the U.S, for the purposes of the present Convention, a child means every human being below the age of eighteen years unless under the law applicable to the child, majority is attained earlier. Groups predominately focus on child abuse and neglect, child fatalities, foster care, youth aging out of foster care, preventing foster care placement, and adoption.^{[21]} A longstanding movement promoting youth rights in the United States has made substantial gains in the past. Refer to the Convention of the Rights of a Child.

=== United Kingdom ===
The Children's Rights Movement assert that it is the case that children have rights which adults, states and government have a responsibility to uphold. The UK maintains a position that UNCRC is not legally enforceable and is hence 'aspirational' only - albeit a 2003 ECHR ruling states: "The human rights of children and the standards to which all governments must aspire in realizing these rights for all children are set out in the Convention on the Rights of the Child." (Extract from Sahin v Germany, Grand Chamber judgment of the ECHR, July 8, 2003). 18 years after ratification, the four Children's Commissioners in the devolved administrations have united in calling for adoption of the Convention into domestic legislation, making children's rights legally enforceable.

== Convention on the Rights of the Child ==
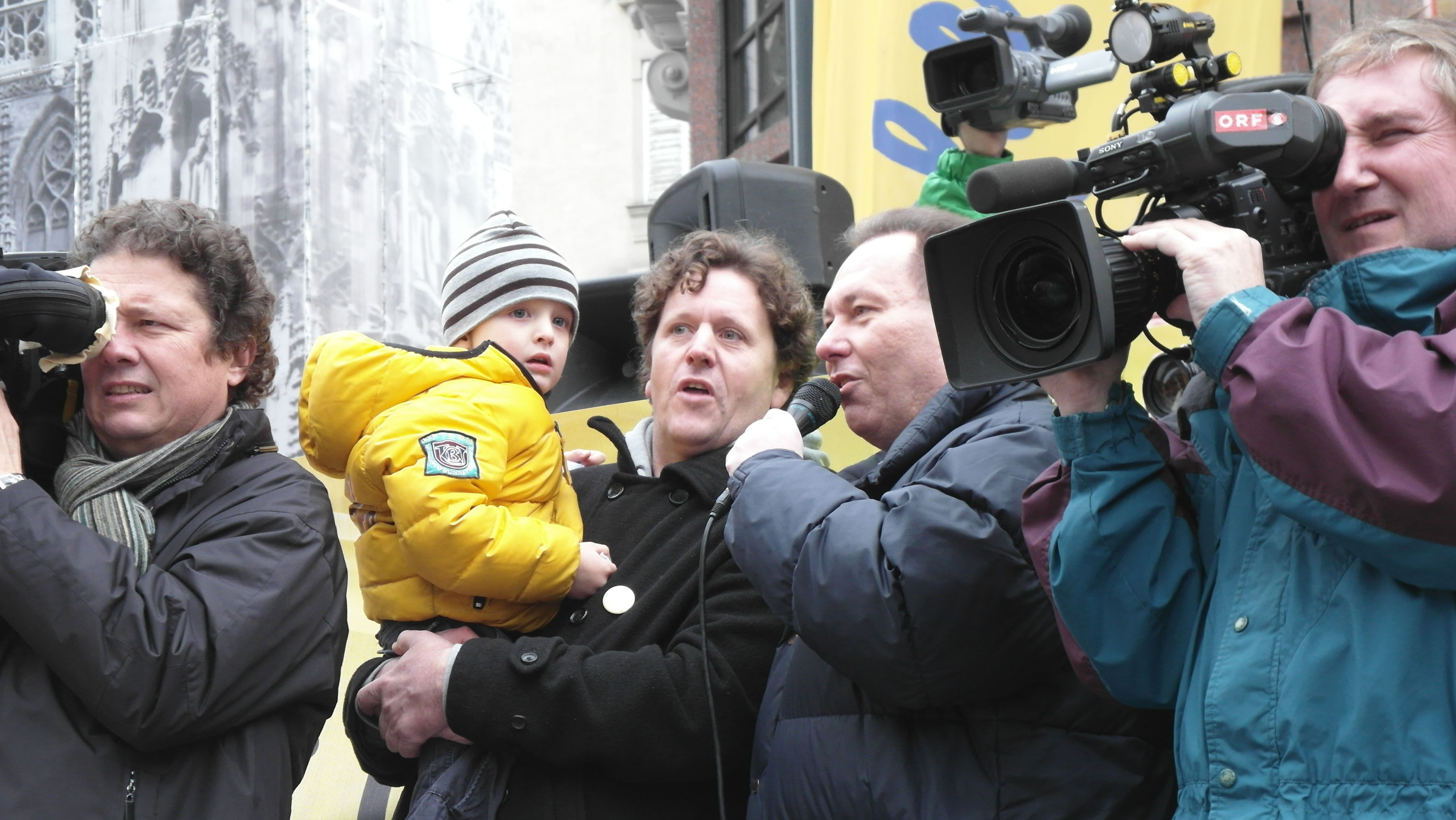
Vienna, Austria; UN Children's Rights day, 2010-11-20.

The United Nations Convention on the Rights of the Child has 54 articles, each outlining a different right. They cover four different groupings of rights; survival, protection, development and participation. The Convention establishes a standard premise for the children's rights movement. It has been ratified by all but two countries; the United States and South Sudan. The US administration under Bush opposed ratifying the convention, stating that there were "serious political and legal concerns that it conflicts with US policies on the central role of parents, sovereignty, and state and local law."

The convention is supplemented by the Optional Protocol on the Involvement of Children in Armed Conflict (against military use of children) and the Optional Protocol on the Sale of Children, Child Prostitution and Child Pornography (against sale of children, child prostitution and child pornography).

=== Parental Rights ===
On October 7, 2020, the vote on United Nations Draft Resolution A/HRC/45/L.48/Rev.1 - "Rights of the child: Realizing the rights of the child through a healthy environment" submitted by Germany (on behalf of the European Union), Uruguay (on behalf of GRULAC) was adopted. The Russian Federation Amendments L.57 and L.64 to include Parental Rights were rejected.

Russian Federation, Ms. Kristina Sukacheva (Introduced L.57- L.64) Tasked with introducing the Convention language on parental rights, Russia ominously noted that governments voting against parents "deliberately shirk their international responsibilities to provide for the rights of the child".

At the time of adoption, Uruguay stated that the incorporation of parental rights language, added by the Russian Federation, would "bring imbalance to the resolution and would also go against the spirit of the resolution". The assertion that parents knock children's rights out of "balance" directly contravenes the Convention on the Rights of the Child (CRC), the international community's most ratified treaty, which references parents, and their rights, repeatedly. Notably, the Russian addition was sourced word for word from the convention.

== Children in power ==
Presently, there are at least thirty countries that have some kind of non-adult structure of parliament, whether nationally or in cities, villages or schools. Many children's parliaments, especially in wealthier nations, are oriented more toward children's education in politics than toward the actual exercise of power in adult political systems.

On the other hand, some children's parliaments do exercise a degree of political power. One of the first children's parliaments, set up in the 1990s in village schools in Rajasthan, India, involves children aged six to fourteen electing child representatives who have been able to make genuine differences for their communities. Some children's parliaments, such as in the city of Barra Mansa in Brazil, have extensive powers over children's issues and control parts of the government budget.

There are also private institutions which are largely governed by children, for instance democratic schools (including Sudbury schools).

== See also ==
- Children's rights
- Global Movement for Children
- Timeline of children's rights in the United States
- Timeline of children's rights in the United Kingdom
- Vienna Declaration and Programme of Action
- Youth Rights
