= Global Movement for Children =

The Global Movement for Children (GMC) is the world-wide movement of organisations and people – including children- uniting efforts to build a world fit for children.

The GMC seeks to jointly promote global advocacy campaigns for child rights and accountability of governments vis-à-vis their children.

The GMC was created as a result of the success of the Say Yes for Children campaign which led to the [UN Special Session on Children] in 2002 resolving to help mobilize citizens of every nation families, communities, civil society, organizations of every kind and children within an active, influential and united movement.

The objectives of the GMC are to:

- unite and coordinate organisations and people to influence public opinion and organise collective action;
- promote and support child participation;
- encourage political commitments and accountability.

== History ==
The children's rights movement has existed since the early years of the twentieth century when individuals, public institutions and NGOs began to unite their efforts to improve the fate of children around the world. In recent years the movement has seen a dramatic growth and gained greater coherence with the drafting and entry into force of the Convention on the Rights of the Child (1989) passed on the 30th anniversary of the ‘Declaration of the Rights of the Child’.

Events following the adoption of the convention enhanced the significance of the movement even more, namely:

- the World Summit for Children in 1990.
- Graça Machel's study on the Impact of Armed Conflict on Children (1996)
- a series of global campaigns against landmines, child labour, sexual exploitation, and the use of child soldiers;
- the GMC Convening Committee for the Say Yes for Children campaign (2000), formally established the Global Movement for Children in 2002 bringing together some of the biggest organisations working with children.
- the UN General Assembly’s Special Session on Children (2002).

At the UN General Assembly’s Special Session on Children in 2002 the name Global Movement for Children (GMC) was first coined. The purpose of naming the Global Movement for Children was to help make visible to the world’s leaders the thousands of organisations and millions of citizens, voters – and children themselves – who are today united in this cause.

Nelson Mandela and Graça Machel launched the GMC at the United Nations and since then, it has brought together thousands of organisations in advocating for children rights. Over the years, the GMC has focused on the following issues:

- Girl's education
- Children and AIDS
- Violence against children
- Child survival
- Children on the move and child traffic

=== The role of Nelson Mandela and Graça Machel in the Global Movement for Children ===
Nelson Mandela and Graça Machel are the patrons of the GMC, its visible spokespeople and its inspirational leaders. As the key players in the Global Movement for Children, Machel and Mandela engage political, civil society, youth, religious and other leaders in the campaign to improve the lives of children.

== UN General Assembly resolution regarding the GMC ==
In 2002, the General Assembly of the United Nations agreed the following: Article 62: "We hereby recommit ourselves to spare no effort in continuing with the creation of a world fit for children, building on the achievements of the past decade and guided by the principles of first call for children. In solidarity with a broad range of partners, we will lead a Global Movement for Children that creates an unstoppable momentum for change." Article 62, Section D, A World Fit for Children, Report of the United Nations General Assembly Special Session on Children (A/S-27/19/Rev.1)

== Convening committee ==
At present, the GMC is led by a coalition of the largest organisations and networks focused on children composed at a global level by ENDA Tiers Monde, Plan International, REDLAMYC, Save the Children, UNICEF and World Vision, which together make up the Convening Committee. At a regional level, the GMC is led by the Regional Platforms which are in turn integrated by national platforms of organisations working with child rights.

=== Focus of the convening committee ===
- Child rights-based approach: the CC focuses on the realisation of child rights as defined by the Convention on the Rights of the Child.
- Children's participation: the best advocates for children are children themselves. Those who are marginalised, vulnerable or living in poverty are better able to understand how this affects their daily lives, and should be able to fully participate in planning and implementing solutions. Children have an active role in the GMC, mainly at the local and national levels but also at the international level.
- Gender equity: girls and boys have the same rights and the CC works for the attainment of such principle. This implies an approach that is gender sensitive and that pays particular attention to the rights of girls.
- Multisectoral and holistic approach: the group seeks to build partnerships with those existing national, regional and international coalitions advocating for children's rights.
- Institutional and long term reform: the organisations pay attention to advocacy. They focus on lobbying for institutional change to create the conditions for the full implementation of the Convention of the Rights of the Child.
