= Germia Park =

City park in Pristina, Kosovo

- Parku i Gërmisë (Albanian) Park Grmija or Парк Грмија (Serbian)
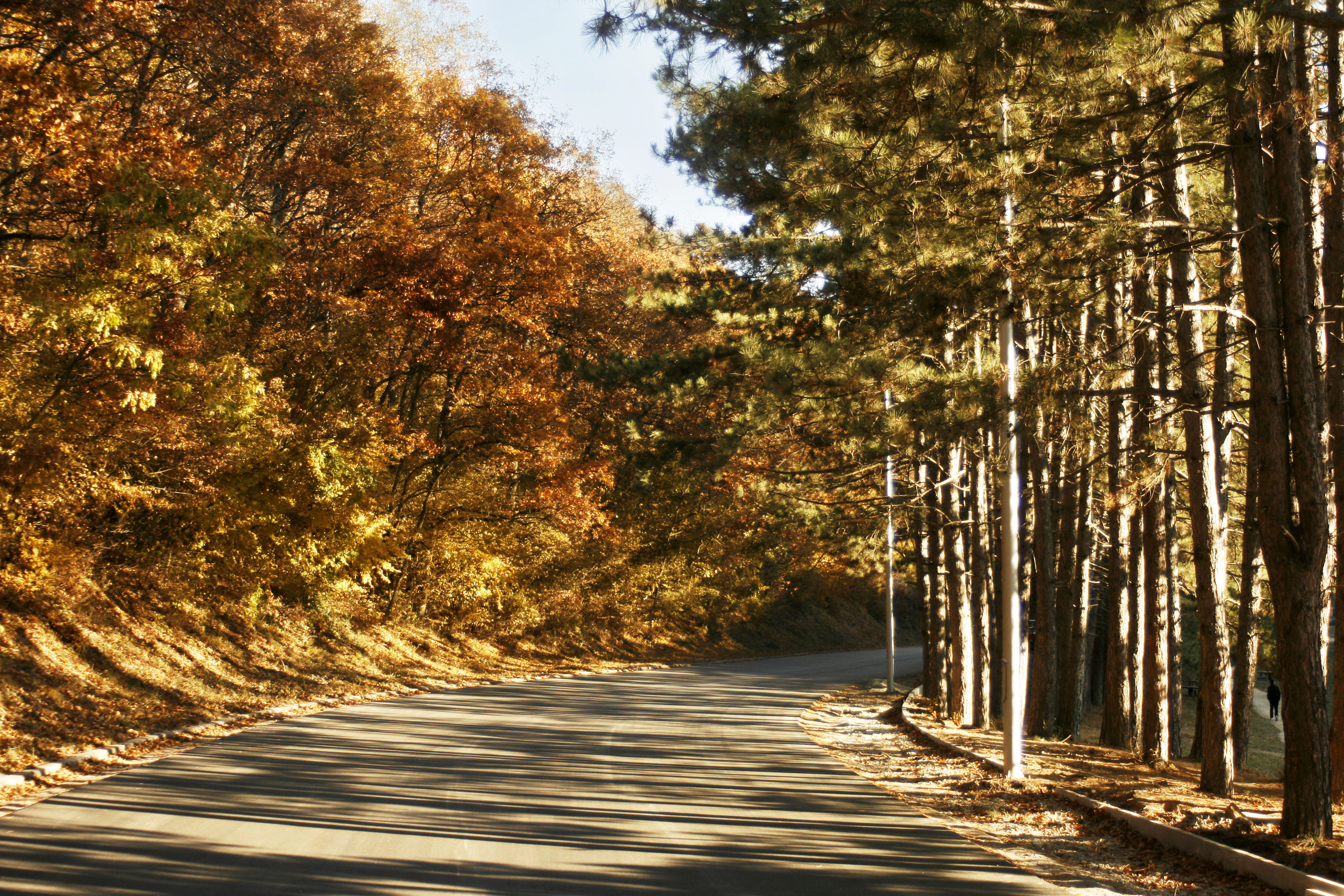
- Interactive map of Germia Park
- Location: Pristina, Kosovo
- Coordinates: 42.673°N 21.195°E
- Area: 6,200 ha (24 sq mi)

Germia Park (Albanian: Parku i Gërmisë; Serbian: Парк Грмија, romanized: Park Grmija) is a regional park located in the northeast of Pristina, Kosovo, and covers an area of 62 square kilometres (24 sq mi). Its highest point, Butos Peak, is 1050 meters above sea level and its lowest 663 meters above sea level.

Due to its geographical position and climate conditions, Germia massif has a rich fauna with 63 species of animals and a variety of about 600 species of flora. In 1987, the "Germia" complex was taken under protection by Pristina's Municipal Assembly in the category of the Regional Nature Park and is now managed by the publicly owned enterprise "Hortikultura". However, according to International Union for Conservation of Nature (IUCN), Germia should be designated as a protected landscape.

== History ==
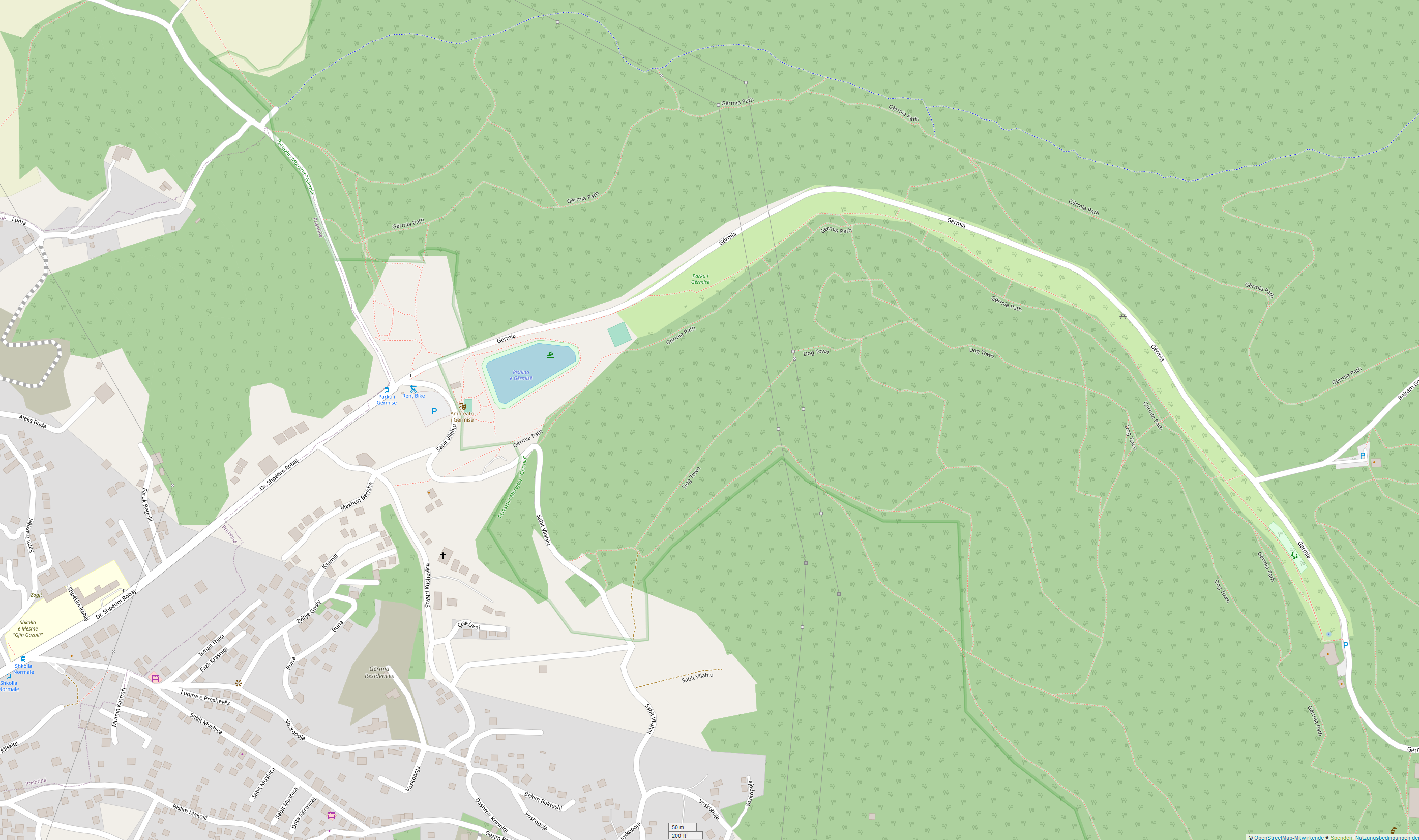
Map of Germia Regional Park

According to the classification of the International Union for Conservation of Nature (IUCN), Germia's protected area is part of the defense category V (Protected Landscape) of objects with special significance for protection. According to IUCN, this area was evidenced in the Green List of Protected Areas of 1997, in which Sharri's National Park is the only other are from Kosovo. In 1966, a portion of Germia was declared as a "forest for picnic", while in 1979 it entered the second category (rational and controlled exploitation of natural resources).

== Relief ==
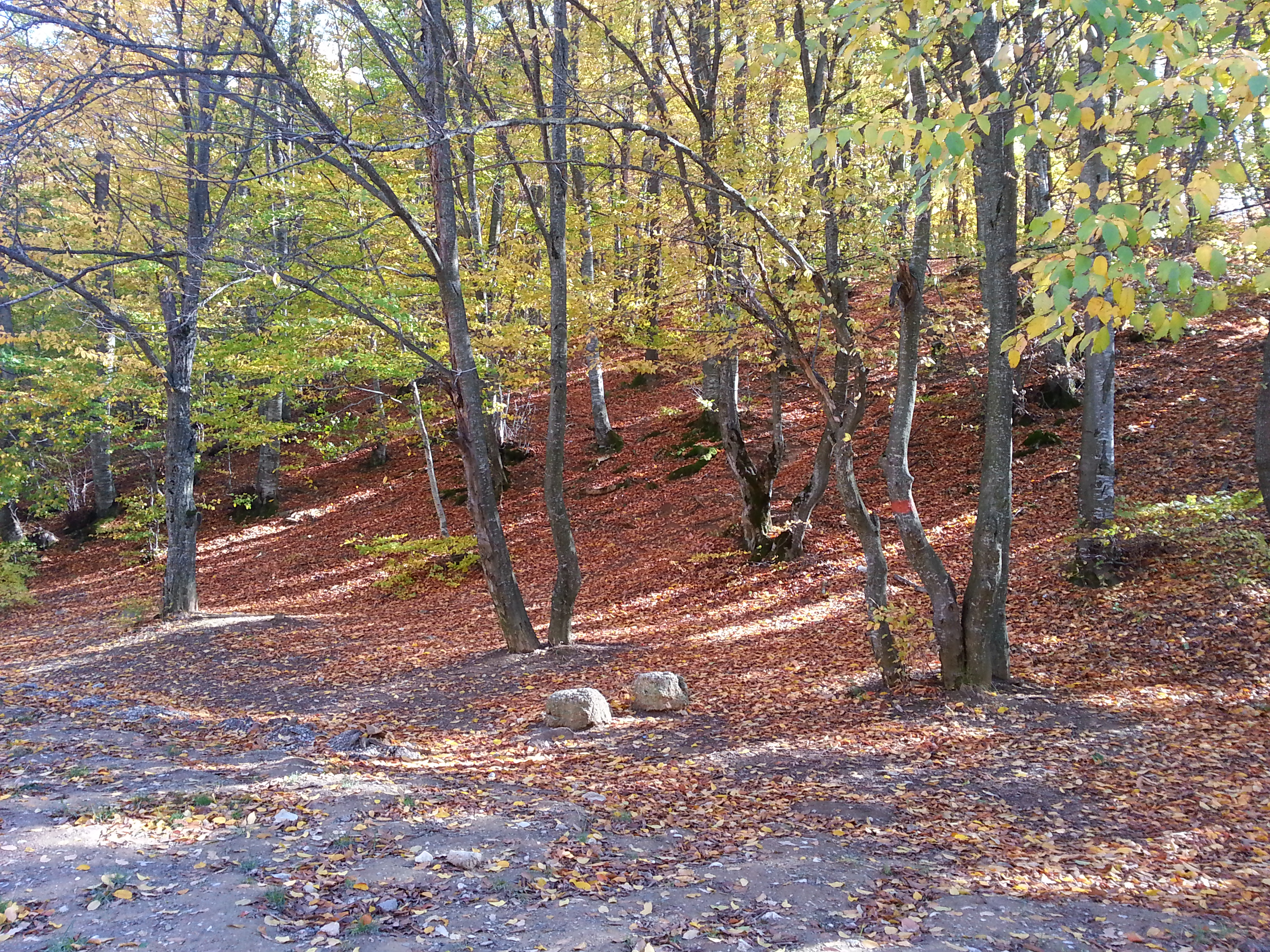
Pathway in Germia

In geological terms, it has been determined that Germia mountain massif consists of layers formed during the Paleozoic, Mesozoic and the Cenozoic eras, where the flysch character limestone, silica and sand are dominant. The pedological composition mostly consists of skeletal and half-skeletal soils. Predominantly, there are maroon-colored flysch character lands, shale rocks and deep brown soil. Germia mountain massif consists of hills and slopes of different heights which are separated by valleys, streams and rivers. The Vellusha river valleys, which stems in the western part of Butos' hill, is worth mentioning. The hills of Butos represent the most characteristic landscape, with over 1000 meters altitude and length of approximately 8 kilometers. This part lies between the river of Prishtina on the north and the Badovc Lake on the south.

== Climate ==
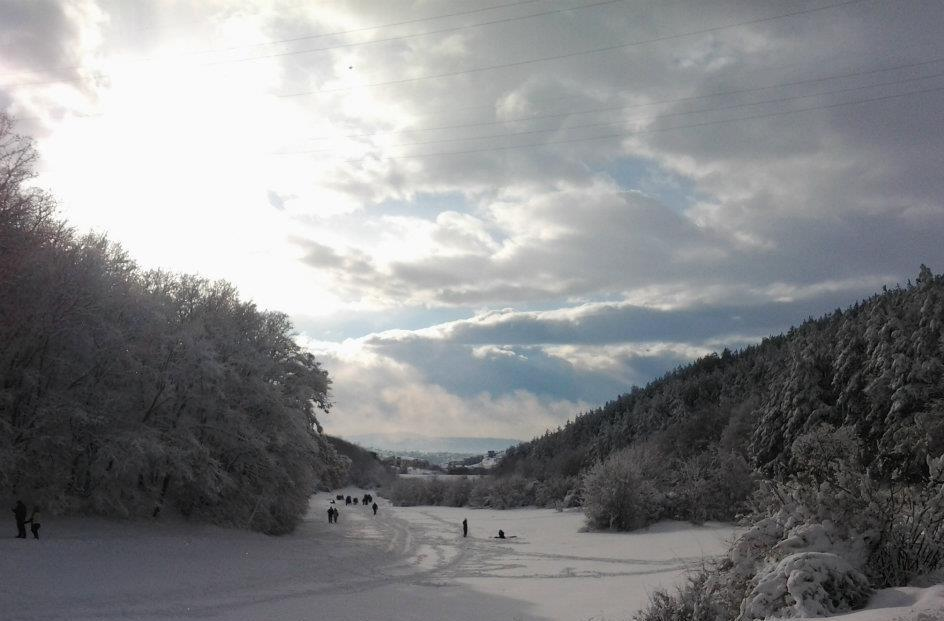
Gërmia during winter

According to the Hydrometeorological Institute of Kosovo (HIK), the average annual temperature is 9.8 °C and the annual rainfall is 605 millimeters. July and August are the warmest months, with an approximate temperature of 19.5 °C, and the coldest month is January, with a temperature of −1.5 °C. These temperature values vary by 1 to 2 °C, depending on elevation.

== Hydrology ==
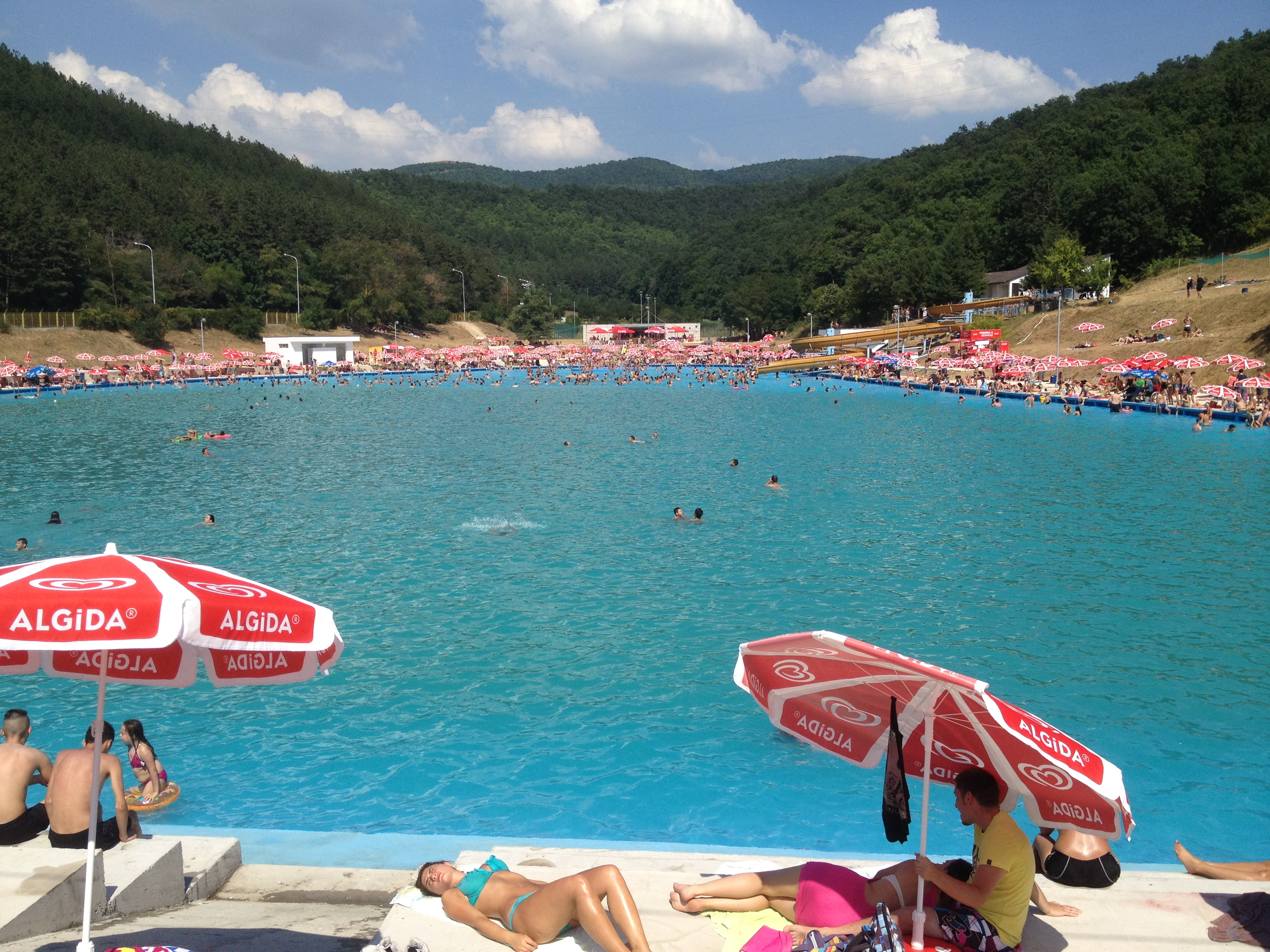
Swimming Pool of Germia

In hydrological terms, due to the small amount of annual rainfall, geological base, etc., Germia is quite poor in water. Vellusha and Prishtina's river are considered slightly larger bodies of water. There are also plenty of water resources in Germia which dry partially during the year. Nowadays, these water sources are connected in a network that transmits water to Germia swimming pool.

== Species ==
The Germia massif is the most important biodiversity area of Pristina. It has 610 types of vascular floras classified in 82 families, 5 of which are endemic and twelve are medical species. There is also a large number of extinct plants such as bushy bedstraw (Galium mateii) and northern holly fern (Polystichum lonchitis), as well as some endangered plants like Macedonian oak (Quercus trojana), Illyrian buttercup (Ranunculus illyricus), lady orchid (Orchis purpurea) etc. 83 types of mushrooms were identified including porcini (Boletus edulis), chanterelle (Cantharellus cibarius), Caesar's mushroom (Amanita cesarea) etc. Over 75% of Germia Park surface is covered by Hungarian oak, Turkey oak, sessile oak and common beech genus. Vegetation of Gërmia consists of four forest genera: Hungarian and Turkey oak (Quercetum frainetoo cerris scardicum Kras.), hornbeam (Carpinus betulus), sessile oak (Quercus sessiliflora) and common beech (Fagus sylvatica). Five species of amphibians including fire salamander (Salamandra salamandra) and European tree frog (Hyla arborea), seven species of reptiles represented by wall lizard (Lacerta muralis) and Hermann's tortoise (Testudo hermani), thirty-two species of birds - golden eagle (Aquila chrysaetos), imperial eagle (Aquila heliacal), woodpecker (Picidae) and nineteen species of mammals which include European hedgehog (Erinaceus europeus) and squirrel (Sciurus vulgaris). Insects compromise the largest animal group on this massif.

== Recreation ==
The recreation area covers an area of 41.40.52 ha, where most of the area is coated with forests of oak and beech while the rest includes meadows, roads and other infrastructure. This area starts from Germia's pool and stretches to the beginning of the ski lift, including meadows, children's playground, sports terrains and inns. The meadow, which begins at the entrance of the area is surrounded by forests of oak and beech and it is regulated as a picnic spot. The surface of it was reduced after the regulation of the parking lots. Three restaurants were built after the war in this area.

== Gallery ==
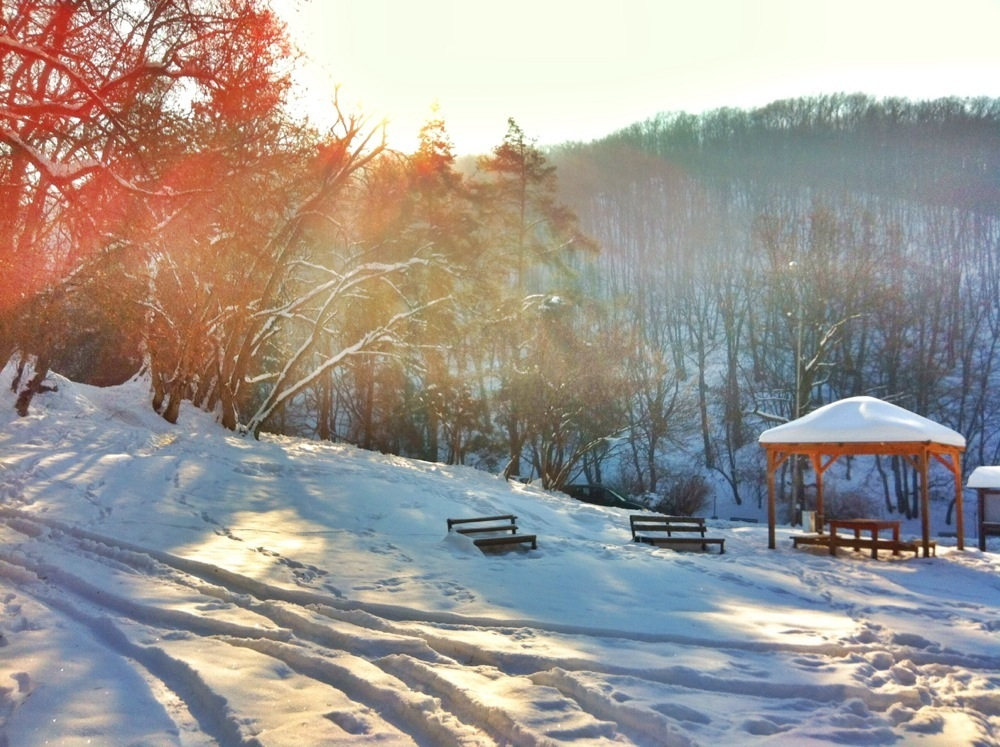

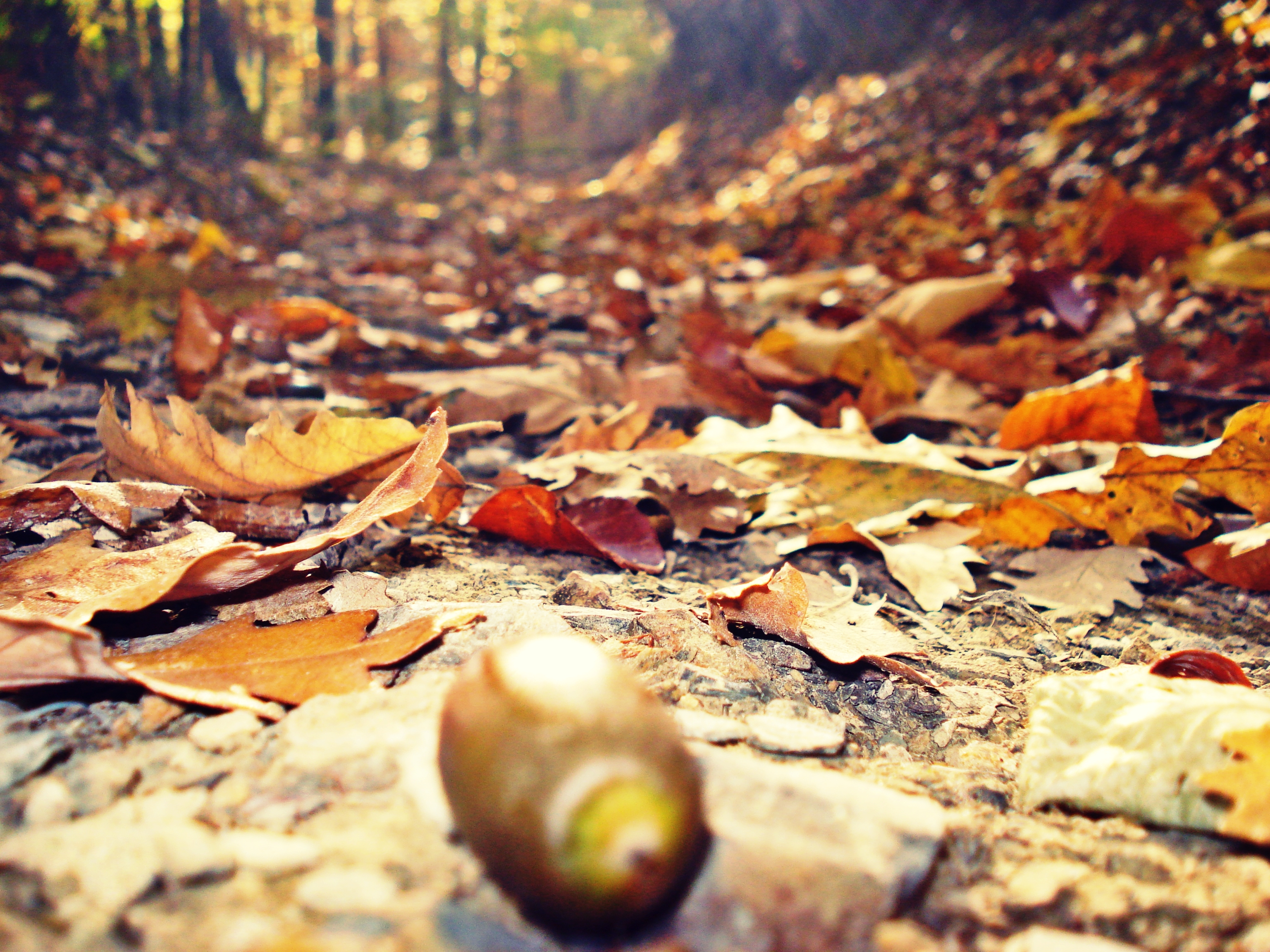

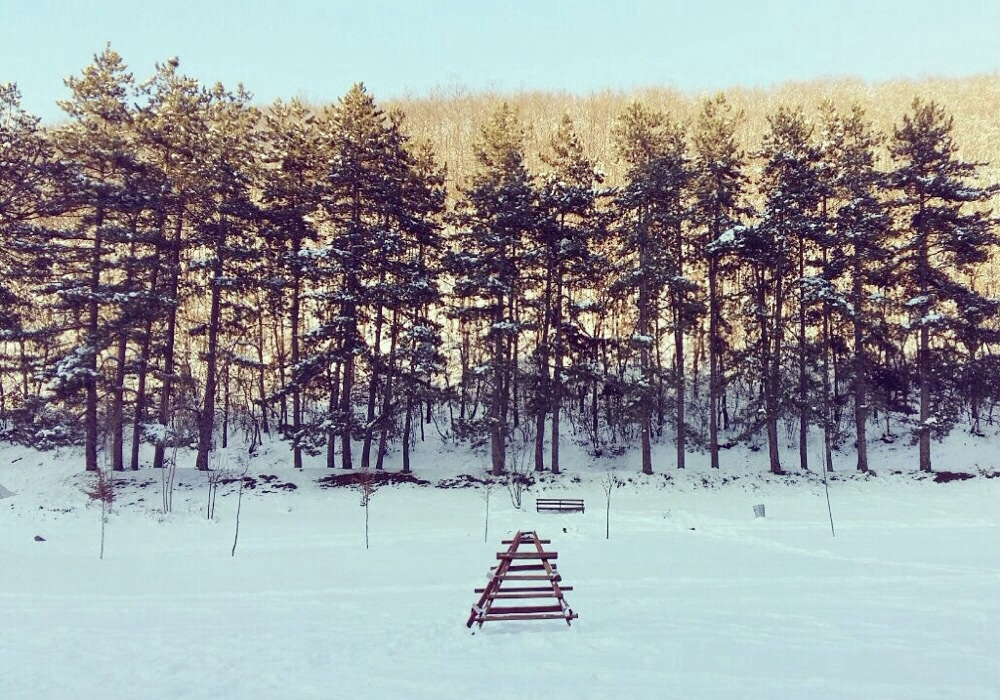

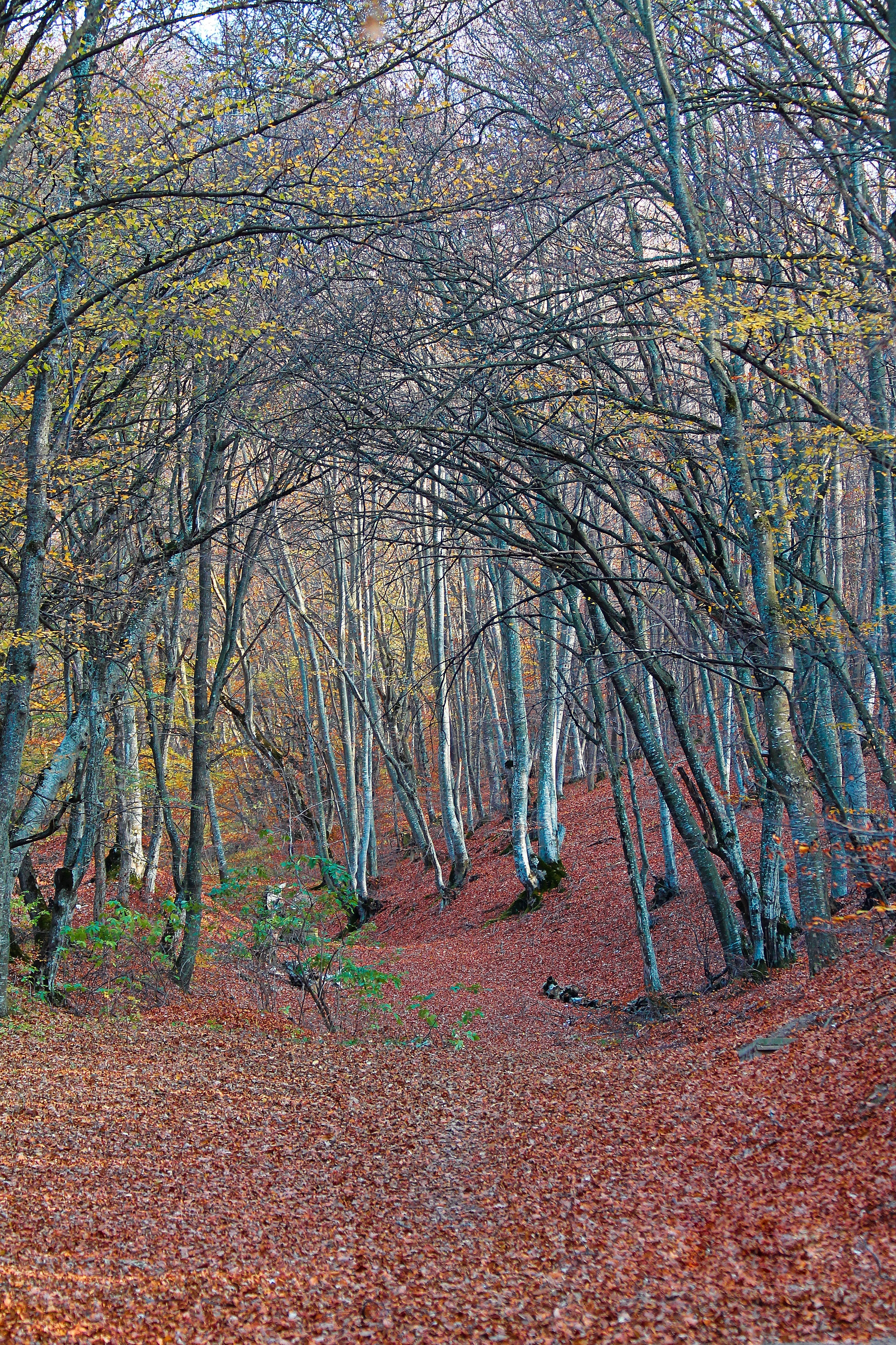

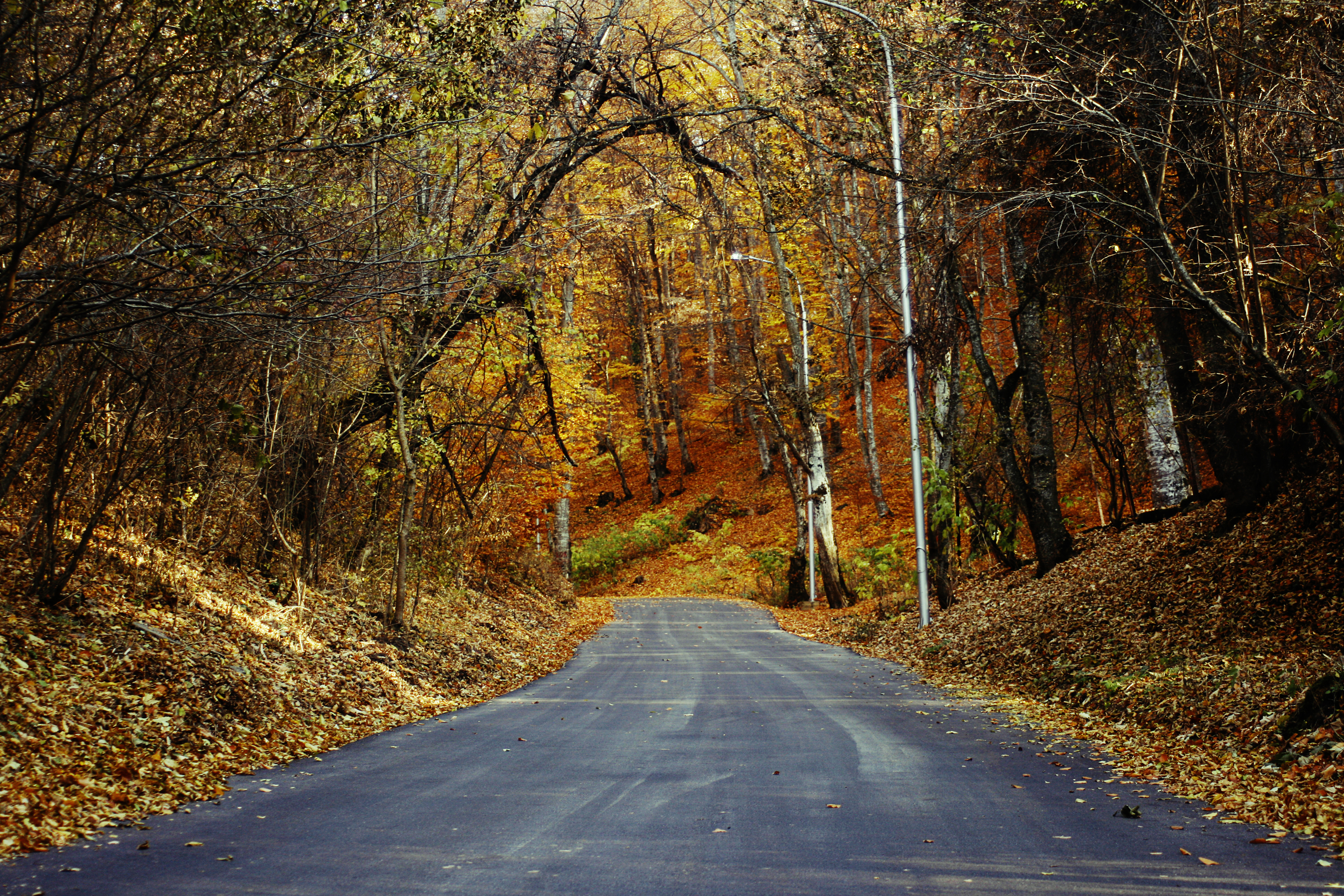

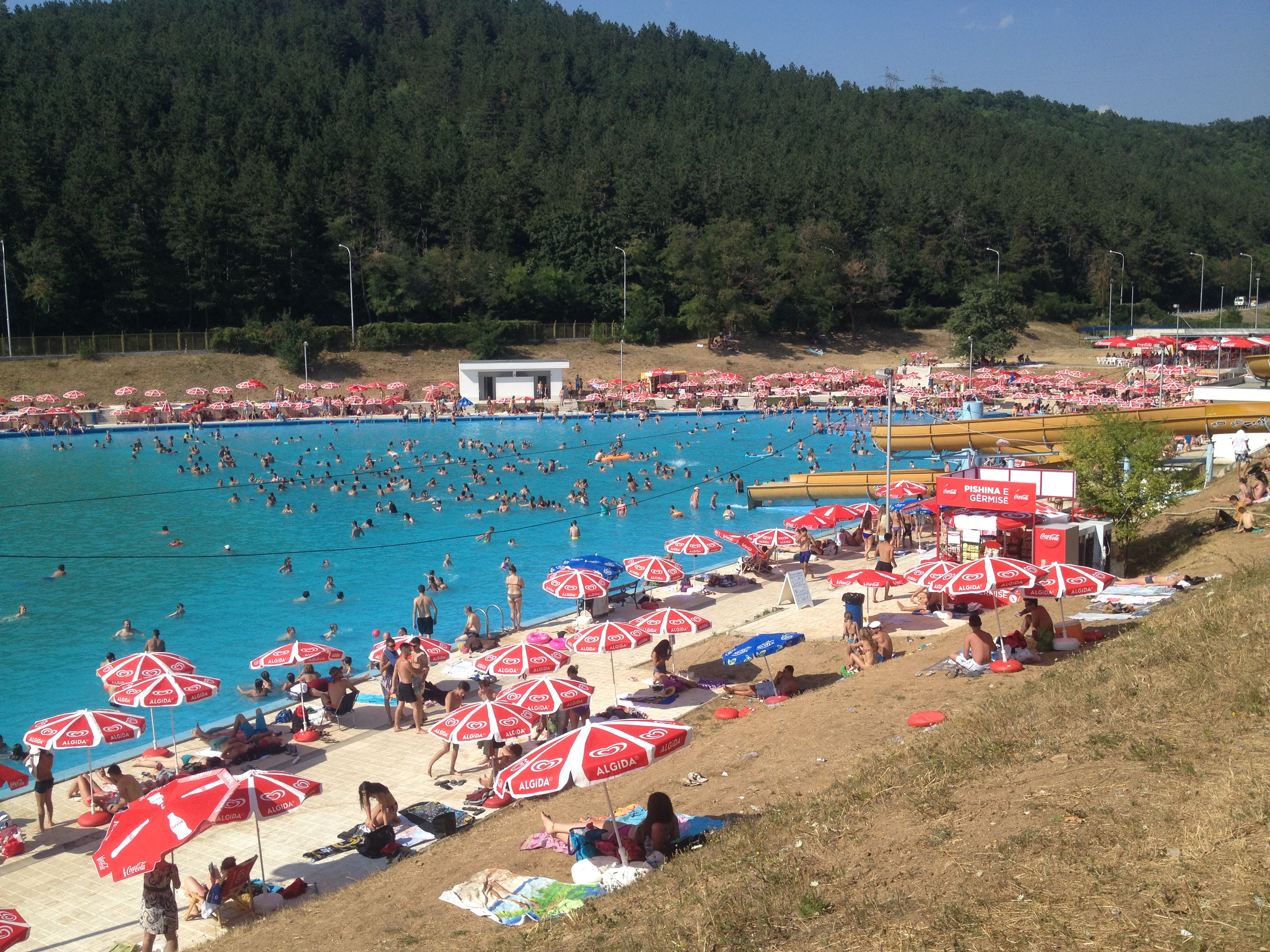
Gërmia's swimming pool

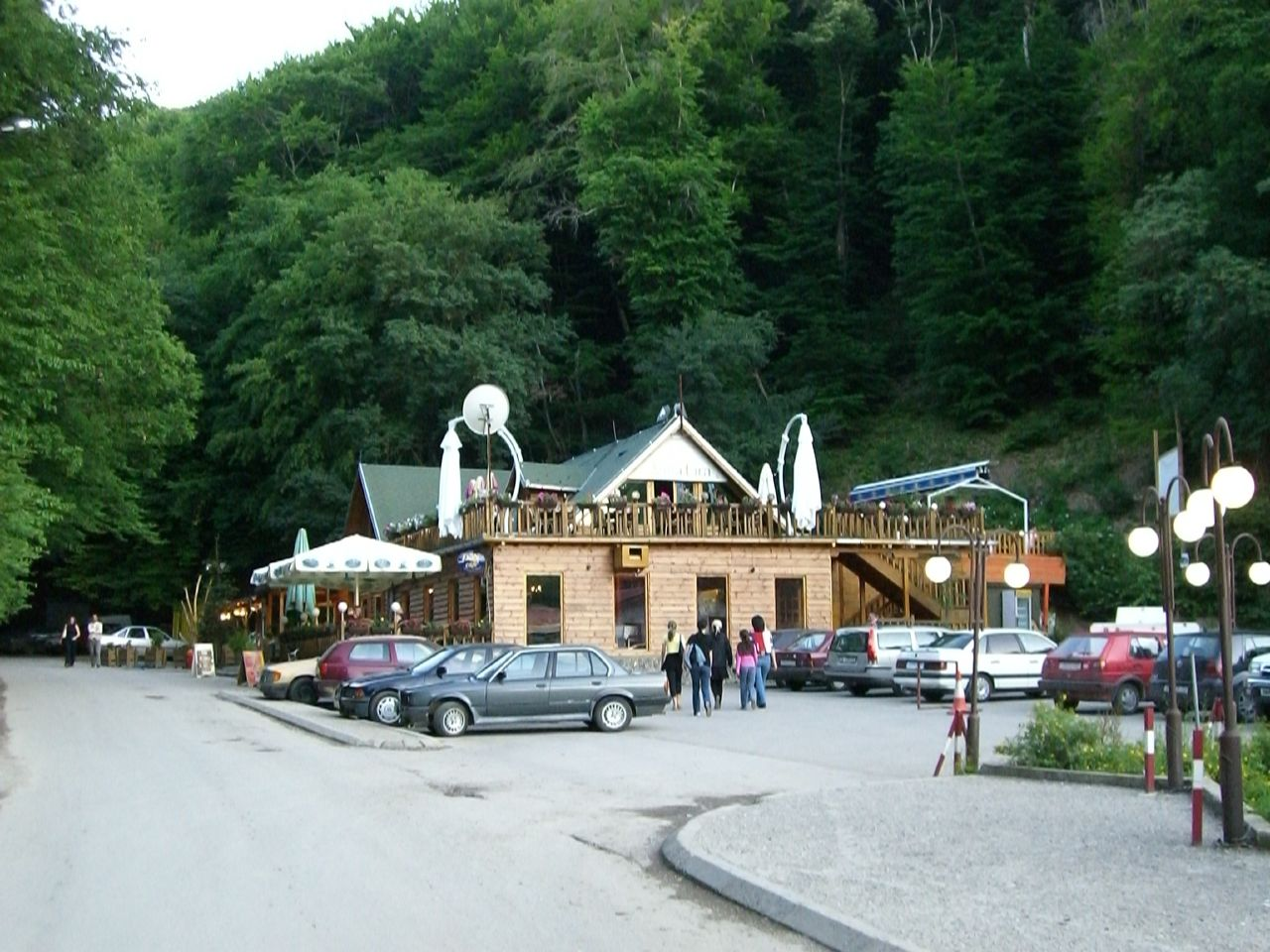
Restaurant in Gërmia
