= Germia swimming pool =

Swimming pool in Kosovo

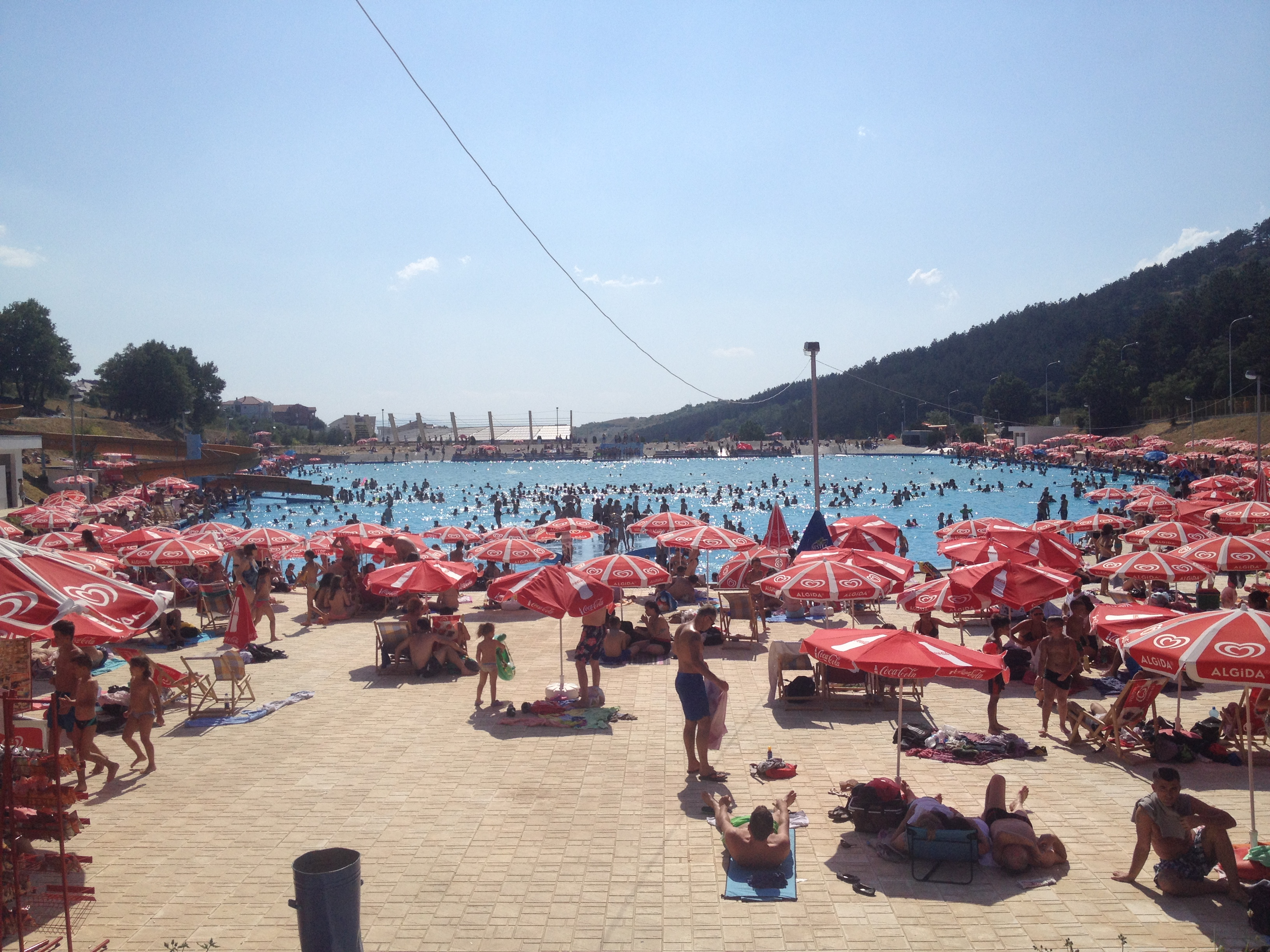
Gërmia swimming pool near Pristina

The Gërmia swimming pool, also known as Gërmia Lake, is an open-air freshwater pool located on the outskirts of Pristina, the capital of Kosovo. Situated approximately 5 kilometers from the city center, Gërmia Swimming Pool is a recreational destination in Pristina, known for its large size and the natural setting of Gërmia Park.

== Overview ==
Built in 1987, the pool is part of Gërmia Park, an area renowned for its natural beauty and recreational environment. Covering an area of 12,000 square meters with a total water capacity of around 20,000 cubic meters, the pool is considered one of the largest of its kind in the Balkans and Southeastern Europe. In 2001, the pool had a water capacity of 28,000 liters of freshwater.

The pool has an elevation of 663 meters above sea level and a maximum depth of 1.90-2 meters, accommodating between 4,000 and 4,500 visitors. Nearby amenities include an amphitheater, two restaurants, recreational and sports courts (for basketball, volleyball, and tennis), public baths, and a children's playground. Germia swimming pool, together with the surrounding area, offers a wide range of activities for visitors, including jogging, walking dogs and cats, and other recreational activities. During the summer, the pool and its surrounding areas serve as a popular gathering place for families and youth, while throughout the year, the area is used for various sports and recreational purposes.
