= Global Management Challenge =

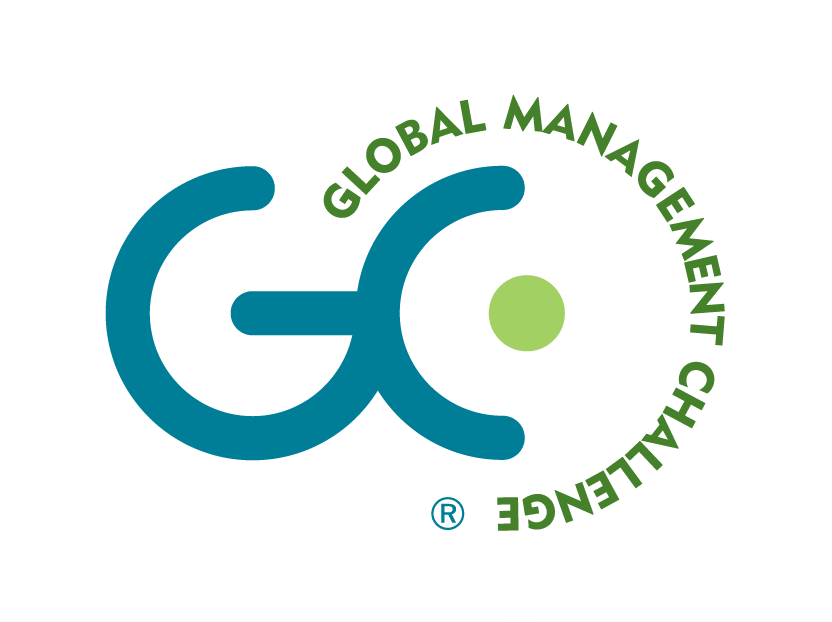
- Abbreviation: GMC
- Formation: 1980; 46 years ago
- Purpose: Business management education
- Location: Lisbon, Portugal
- Products: Competition
- Members: 30 participating countries (2024)
- Website: worldgmc.com

Global Management Challenge (GMC) is a strategic management competition for managers and university students. Participants form teams of 3–5 members, and each team is placed in a group of 5–8 teams, depending the competition. The teams are then given a virtual company, initially identical to every other company in the competition. Each team then develops their company by making a series of decisions relating to every aspect of the business, such as how many machines to buy, or how much to spend on advertising. In each round, five sets of decisions are taken, corresponding to five quarters. A quarter is a period said to span three months.

These decisions - made on the Decision Sheet - are run through business simulation software, which generates Management Reports, showing the consequences of the decisions. The aim is to finish the game with the highest share-price on the virtual stock exchange.

The competition is divided into rounds with usually 3 or 4 rounds on national level and 2 rounds on international level. The number of national rounds can vary in each country and depends on number of participants. Some countries use slightly different approach and combine Global Management Challenge with other competitions. In India teams compete in another competition which is more sector related (e.g. they run a car manufacturing company) and the last 8 teams join GMC national final. Also in Germany the participants play GMC only in their final round. As it might seem interesting it brings disadvantage to those teams because they are not so familiar with the simulation compared to other teams on the international level.

== History ==
The concept of the competition emerged in 1980 in Portugal by SDG – Simuladores e Modelos de Gestão – in partnership with Expresso, a weekly newspaper. The GMC computer model was designed by Edit 515 Limited, registered in Scotland, U.K. It is updated frequently to reflect real world trading conditions and business risks, the aim being to present competitors with very realistic and complex business scenarios, with varied challenges and problems.

The Global Management Challenge is now the world's biggest strategic management competition - 20000 participants annually. More than 400,000 university students and company managers around the world participated since 1980.

Over 30 countries currently participate in the contest, some of which are: Angola, Australia, Belarus, Belgium, Bolivia, Brazil, Czech Republic, Denmark, Finland, France, Germany, Ghana, Greece, Hong Kong SAR (China), Hungary, India, Italy, Kazakhstan, Latvia, Macau SAR (China), Mexico, Morocco, Nigeria, People's Republic of China, Poland, Portugal, Romania, Russia, Singapore, Slovakia, Spain, Turkey, Ukraine, United Kingdom and Venezuela.

For the 2010-2011 session, two new African countries are entering the contest: Ivory Coast, Benin, in partnership with Educarriere.net, a leading website in Ivory Coast which have been famous because it used to publish the result of many exams.

Each country organizes its own National competition, the model producing all material in the language of that country. The winners of the National competition meet to contest the International Semi-Finals and, if successful, go on to compete in the International Final (with results still in each of the countries' native language).

== World Champions ==
In 1980—the first year of the competition—only Portuguese teams competed. For the next two years, the GMC winner was decided by a Luso-Brazilian final, between Portugal and Brazil. Brazil won in 1981 and Portugal won in 1982. Since 1983, the winner has been decided at an International Final, hosted by one of the competing countries. The winners of each year's competition are listed below:

Year	Winner	Number of participating countries	Host country
1980	Portugal	1	Portugal
1981	Brazil	2	Portugal
1982	Portugal	2	Brazil
1983	Portugal	3	Portugal
1984	Portugal	5	Portugal
1985	Portugal	6	Portugal
1986	Spain	5	Portugal
1987	United Kingdom	8	Portugal
1988	Spain	7	Portugal
1989	Portugal	7	Portugal
1990	United Kingdom	7	Portugal
1991	Portugal	5	Portugal
1992	Spain	4	Portugal
1993	Portugal	5	Portugal
1994	Portugal	5	Portugal
1995	Spain	7	Portugal
1996	France	8	Portugal
1997	Brazil	7	France
1998	Portugal	9	Macau SAR
1999	P.R. China	9	Portugal
2000	P.R. China	10	Portugal
2001	Czech Republic	11	France
2002	P.R. China	11	Macau SAR
2003	P.R. China	15	Portugal
2004	Poland	16	Portugal
2005	P.R. China	19	Poland
2006	Czech Republic	24	Macau SAR
2007	Macau SAR	25	Romania
2008	Russia	30	Portugal
2009	Ukraine	25	Russia
2010	Slovakia	25	Macau SAR
2011	Russia	25	Ukraine
2012	Ukraine	24	Romania
2013	Russia	22	Russia
2014	Russia	22	Czech Republic
2015	Russia	25	Macau SAR
2016	Macau SAR	26	Qatar
2017	Czech Republic	26	(United Arab Emirates) UAE
2018	Russia	26	Russia
2019	Macau SAR	16	Online
2020	Portugal	20	Russia
2021	(Georgia (country)) Georgia	15	Spain
2022	China	14	(Russia) Angola
2023	China	14	(Russia) India
2024			Macau SAR

International Final wins per country since 1983
Rank	Country	Number of wins
1	Portugal	9
2	P.R. China	7
3	Russia	6
4	Spain	4
5	United Kingdom	2
5	Czech Republic	2
5	Ukraine	2
8	Brazil	1
8	France	1
8	Poland	1
8	Macau SAR	1
8	Slovakia	1
8	(Georgia (country)) Georgia	1
