= Expresso (newspaper) =

Portuguese weekly paper

- Liberdade para pensar ("Freedom to think")

- The 1 November 2024 front page of Expresso
- Type: Weekly newspaper
- Format: Berliner
- Owner: Impresa (Sojornal)
- Editor: João Vieira Pereira
- Founded: 6 January 1973; 53 years ago
- Political alignment: Centre-right
- Language: Portuguese
- Headquarters: Lisbon
- Circulation: 71,465 (January–August 2015)
- ISSN: 0870-1970
- Website: www.expresso.pt

Expresso (Portuguese pronunciation: [ɐjˈʃpɾɛsu]) is a flagship weekly publication of the Impresa Group for Portugal.

== History ==
Expresso was first published on 6 January 1973. The founder was Francisco Pinto Balsemão. The paper is based in Lisbon and is published on a weekly basis. The newspaper is part of the Portuguese company Impresa, which also controls various magazines, including Caras and Visão, among others.

Expresso was published in broadsheet format until September 2006 when it switched to Berliner format. It is the first Portuguese paper to be published in Berliner format.

A weekly newspaper, it incorporates various supplements, covering general news, business, sports, international news, entertainment, society, a magazine, recruitment and real estate classified supplements, as well as having a site on the Internet. It is particularly known for its editorial independence and its probing political reporting.

The Prémio Pessoa is a notable Portuguese award instituted in 1987 by Expresso and the Unisys Company. It is one of the most reputed prizes awarded in Portugal, named after the poet Fernando Pessoa. In 1980 Expresso, in partnership with SDG – Simuladores e Modelos de Gestão – created the Global Management Challenge, a strategic management competition for university students.

In 2014, Expresso was the recipient of the Meios and Publicidade award in the category of weekly generalist publication. The paper received the European Newspaper Award in 2006 and in 2015 in the category of weekly newspaper.

== Circulation ==
The circulation of Expresso was 138,000 copies during the period between January and September 2000. Between January and March 2003 its circulation was 142,000 copies, making it the best-selling newspaper in Portugal.

Expresso was again the best-selling newspaper in the country with a circulation of 118,000 copies in 2007. Its circulation was 117,507 copies in 2008. The 2011 circulation of the paper was 108,923 copies. The paper sold 93,707 copies between September and October 2013. It dropped to 71,465 copies between January and August 2015.
