= Greater Manchester Challenge =

Greater Manchester Challenge was a 23-meter gaff rigged ketch sail training yacht.

She was designed by the renowned yacht designer Laurent Giles and built for the Ocean Youth Club fleet as a job creation project by the Greater Manchester Maritime Trust, with construction beginning in 1984. She was launched in 1986 and commissioned in 1987, sailing from Liverpool.

In 1992 she entered the Columbus Regatta from Liverpool, Lisbon, Canaries, Porto Rico, New York then Boston, winning the first and last leg overall. In the mid 1990s she visited Greenland and Iceland and had a major refit in 1998, with Ocean Youth Trust North West (OYTNW) taking over her operation the following year. In 2008 OYTNW merged with Oakmere Community College and Glaciere Diving School to form a £2.5m charity for disadvantaged young people in Merseyside. The ship was renamed Oakmere-GMC, and was operated for four years in, for example, a program to reduce knife crime.

In 2018 she was sold into private ownership and began undergoing a major refit.
