= Machel =

Machel may refer to:

== Surname ==
- Graça Machel (born 1945), Mozambican politician and humanitarian, the second wife and widow of Samora Machel, third wife and widow of Nelson Mandela
- Josina Machel (FRELIMO) (1945–1971), activist for Mozambican independence and the emancipation of African women, the first wife of Samora Machel
- Samora Machel (1933–1986), the first president of Mozambique
- Stefan Machel (born 1960), Polish rock guitarist, composer, and record producer

== Given name ==
- Machel Cedenio (born 1995), Trinidadian Olympic athlete
- Machel Millwood (born 1979), Jamaican soccer player
- Machel Montano (born 1974), Trinidadian singer, songwriter, and record producer
- Machel Waikenda (born 1981), Kenyan politician

== See also ==
- Samora Machel constituency, a constituency in the Khomas region of Namibia
