= About You =

About You may refer to:

== Companies ==
- About You (company), a German fashion online retailer

== Songs ==
- "About You" (Shane Filan song), 2013
- "About You", a song by Paul McCartney from his 2001 album Driving Rain
- "About You", a song by Mike Shinoda from his 2018 album Post Traumatic
- "About You", a song by Caravan Palace from the 2019 album Chronologic
- "About You", a song by G Flip from her 2019 album About Us
- "About You" (The 1975 song), 2022
- "About You", a song by Ayumi Hamasaki from her 2004 album My Story
- "About You", a song by Greta from their 1995 album This Is Greta
- "About You...", a song by Ami Suzuki released as a B-side to her 2005 single "Delightful"
- "About You" (No Songs Left to Sing), a 2017 song by the Used
- "About You" (Trey Songz song)
- "About You" (MacKenzie Porter song)

== See also ==
- All About You (disambiguation)
- Everything About You (disambiguation)
- How About You (disambiguation)
- Mad About You (disambiguation)
- Something About You (disambiguation)
- Thinking About You (disambiguation)
- What I Like About You (disambiguation)
