= Thinking About You =

Thinking About You may refer to:

== Music ==
- Thinkin' About You, a 1995 album by Trisha Yearwood
- Thinkin' About You, a 1998 album by Rita Coolidge
- "Thinking About You" (Elvis Presley song), 1975
- "Thinking About You" (Whitney Houston song), 1985
- "Thinking About You" (Ivy song), 2005
- "Thinking About You" (Norah Jones song), 2006
- "Thinking About You" (Calvin Harris song), 2013
- "Thinking About You" (Axwell & Ingrosso song), 2016
- "Thinking About You" (Hardwell and Jay Sean song), 2016
- "Thinking About You", a song by Radiohead from Pablo Honey, 1993
- "Thinking About You", a song by Screaming Jets from Scam, 2000
- "Thinking 'Bout You", a song by Yusuf from the album Roadsinger, 2009
- "Thinking 'Bout You", a song by Lil Wayne from the album Free Weezy, 2015
- "Thinking 'Bout You", a song by Ariana Grande from the album Dangerous Woman, 2016
- "Thinking 'Bout You" (Dua Lipa song), 2017
- "Thinking 'Bout You", a song by Dustin Lynch and Lauren Alaina from the album Tullahoma, 2020
- "Thinkin' About You" (Trisha Yearwood song), 1995
- "Thinkin' About You" (Mario song), 2009
- "Thinkin' About You", a song by Britney Spears from the album ...Baby One More Time, 1999
- "Thinkin' About You", a song by Solange from the album Solo Star, 2002
- "Thinkin' About Ya", a song by Timex Social Club from the album Vicious Rumors, 1986
- "Thinkin Bout You" (Frank Ocean song), 2012
- "Thinkin Bout You" (Ciara song), 2019
- "Thinking About Ya", a song by Colby O'Donis from Colby O, 2008
- "Mone Kori (Thinking About You)", a song by Mumzy Stranger, 2008
- "I've Been Thinking About You", a song by Londonbeat, 1990
- "I've Been Thinking About You" (Mariah Carey song), 1993

== See also ==
- Think About You (disambiguation)
- Thinking of You (disambiguation)
