= Dua Lipa (album) =

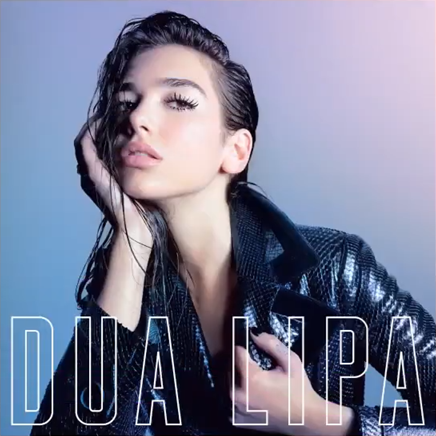
- Standard edition cover (Note: On the deluxe, Japanese and Japanese special editions of Dua Lipa, the cover art uses a purple background. On the Complete Edition cover, a glittery background is used.)

Studio album by Dua Lipa
- Released: 2 June 2017
- Recorded: 2013–2017
- Studios: Atlantic, Comic Sands, Paramount, Pulse, Rocket Carousel, The Synagogue (Los Angeles); Eg's, HyGrade, The Music Shed, Sarm, TaP / Strongroom 7, Wendyhouse (London); KasaKoz (Toronto); Modulator Music (Canada); NRG (North Hollywood); Sony/ATV (Note: The location of Sony/ATV Studios where "Be the One" was recorded is not indicated in the liner notes of Dua Lipa.); Woodshed (Malibu); Zenseven (Woodland Hills)
- Genres: Dance-pop; electropop; R&B
- Length: 40:43
- Label: Warner Bros.
- Producers: Axident; Digital Farm Animals; James Flannigan; Emile Haynie; Ian Kirkpatrick; Stephen "Koz" Kozmeniuk; Jon Levine; Miguel; Bill Rahko; Ten Ven; TMS; Greg Wells; Eg White; Andrew Wyatt

Dua Lipa chronology
Dua Lipa (2017)	Future Nostalgia (2020)

Singles from Dua Lipa
- 1. "New Love" Released: 21 August 2015; 2. "Be the One" Released: 30 October 2015; 3. "Last Dance" Released: 9 February 2016; 4. "Hotter than Hell" Released: 6 May 2016; 5. "Blow Your Mind (Mwah)" Released: 26 August 2016; 6. "Lost in Your Light" Released: 21 April 2017; 7. "New Rules" Released: 7 July 2017; 8. "IDGAF" Released: 12 January 2018

Dua Lipa is the debut studio album by English singer Dua Lipa. It was released on 2 June 2017 through Warner Bros. Records. The album is a dance-pop, electropop, and R&B record with elements of disco, hip hop, and tropical house. The production was handled by artists such as Digital Farm Animals, Andrew Wyatt, Greg Wells, Ian Kirkpatrick, Axident, and James Flannigan, alongside others. It includes a sole guest appearance from Miguel (who also received production credits on the record), as well as additional vocals from Chris Martin of Coldplay.

The album was supported by eight singles, including the UK top-ten singles "Be the One" and "IDGAF", as well as "New Rules", which became Lipa's first number-one on the UK Singles Chart and top-ten hit on the US Billboard Hot 100. Lipa promoted the album with appearances at several award shows, television programs and festivals, as well as embarking on a series of concert tours from 2016 to 2018. She also supported Troye Sivan, Bruno Mars and Coldplay on their respective tours. In October 2018, Lipa reissued the album, subtitled the Complete Edition, adding eight additional tracks including "One Kiss" with Calvin Harris, which was Lipa's second number-one song and the best-selling song of 2018 in the UK, and the UK top-ten single "Electricity" with Silk City.

Dua Lipa was met with generally favourable reviews from music critics. Many praised Lipa's vocals as well as the lyrics and production. It appeared on numerous year-end lists, including ones published by Billboard and Rolling Stone. The album was nominated for British Album of the Year at the Brit Awards, whilst "New Rules", "IDGAF", and "One Kiss", were all nominated for British Single of the Year, the latter of which won. The album also helped Lipa win the Grammy Award for Best New Artist. Despite being released in 2017, the album reached peak popularity and became commercially successful in 2018. It reached number three in the UK, and reached the top 10 in thirteen other countries. The album is certified multi-platinum in the UK and five other countries. As of February 2021, Dua Lipa has sales figures of six million units worldwide.

== Background ==
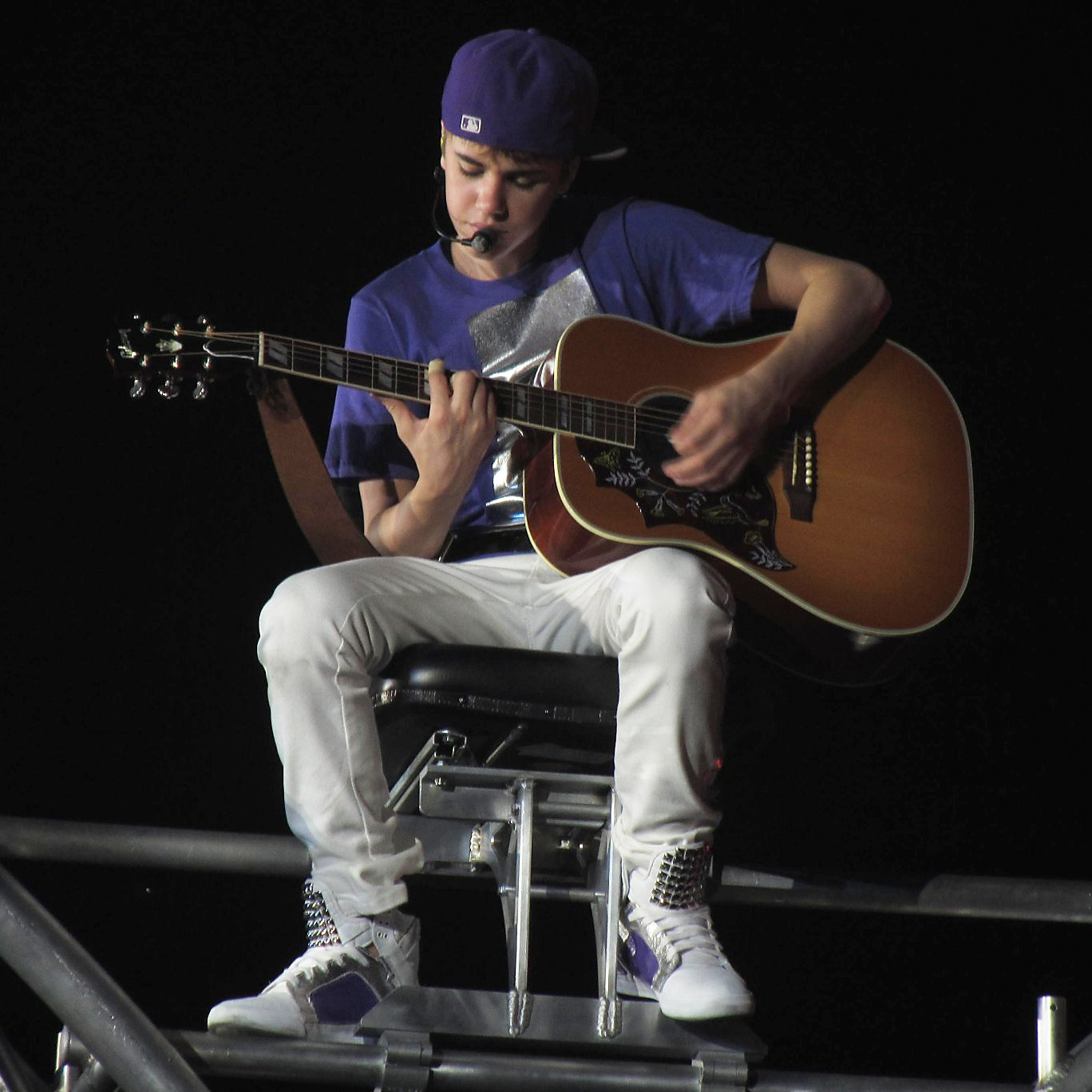
Lipa was inspired by the discovery of Justin Bieber to begin her career using social media.

Lipa developed a love for music at an early age, influenced by her father who performed in the Kosovan rock band Oda. She began singing at the age of five and wrote her first song about how she wanted to be like her mom when she was older. Lipa played the cello in school and also auditioned for her school's choir, but was rejected after being told she could not sing. She began singing lessons after that. While living in Pristina, Kosovo during her teen years, Lipa's ambition to start a music career grew. At the age of 14, she wrote the song, "Lions & Tigers & Bears" which was inspired by The Wizard of Oz (1939). She published it on her SoundCloud page as her first demo in February 2012. Lipa determined that the smaller music industry of Kosovo did not match the type of career she wanted as she desired a "global scale" one. As a result, she relocated to London where she was born, at the age of 15. Her parents felt comfortable allowing her to move there as the daughter of one of their friends lived there.

After finishing school, Lipa took a gap year to find a manager while working at a restaurant. She was influenced by the discovery of Justin Bieber on YouTube which inspired her to take the same route as he. She began a modeling career to gain contacts in the music industry. Lipa began posting covers of songs such as "If I Ain't Got You" (2004) by Alicia Keys and "Beautiful" (2002) by Christina Aguilera on YouTube. Although her videos did not reach great popularity, she used them as a form of portfolio and took them to London clubs such as KOKO where she thought she would meet people from the music industry who she could show them to. Additionally, Lipa uploaded music to SoundCloud, gave demo CDs to radio stations and sang in advertisements. After starring in an X Factor commercial, she met a producer who offered her a publishing deal. Flummoxed by this, she contacted an online friend for help as she did not understand it. He redirected Lipa to his attorney who advised her to not take it. The lawyer was impressed by her and introduced Lipa to Ben Mawson of TAP management while she was holding meetings with management companies. She eventually signed a publishing and management deal with TAP and a record deal with Warner Records; the latter company wanting her because they did not have a big female pop artist.

== Writing and recording ==
=== Early sessions and development ===
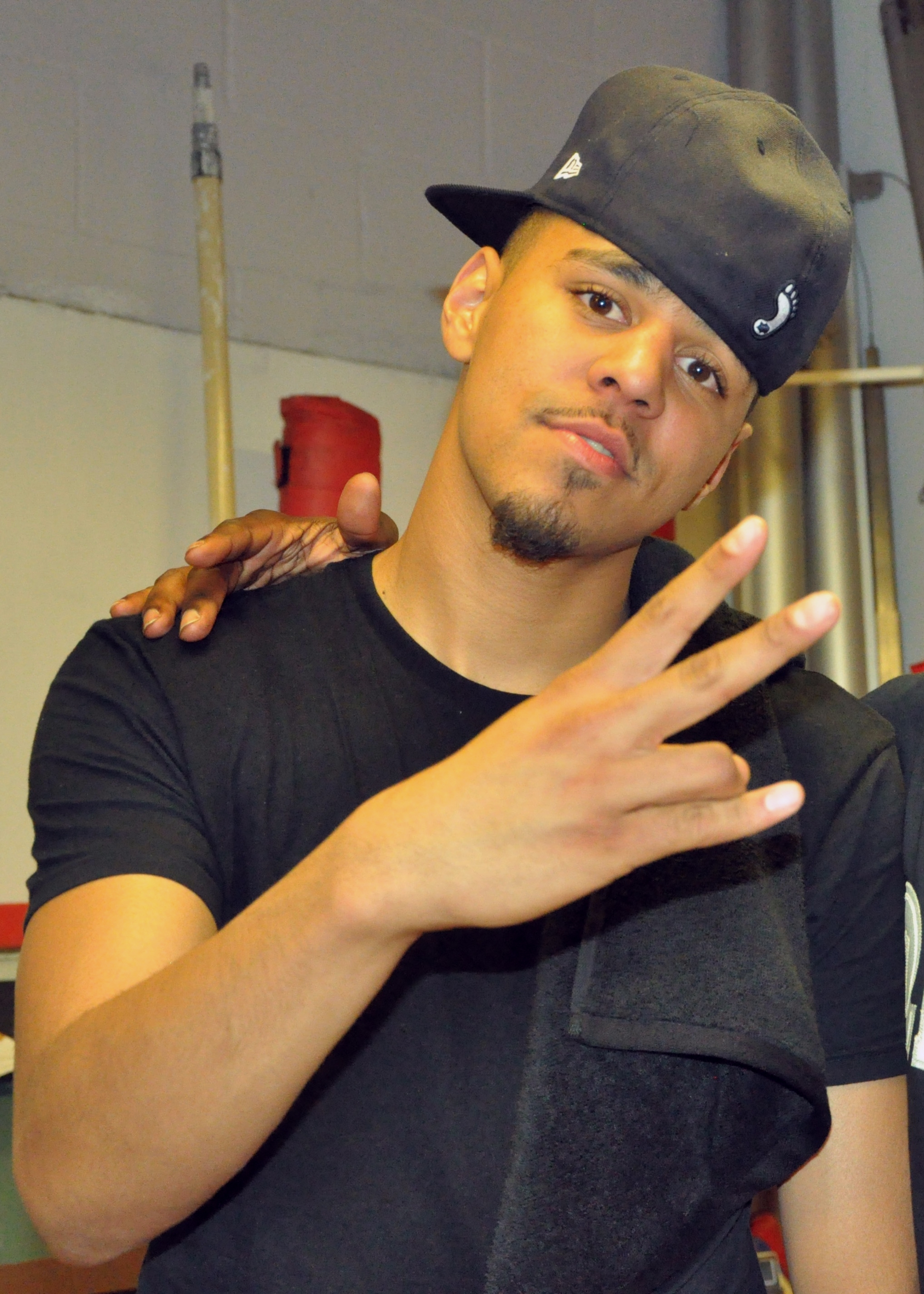
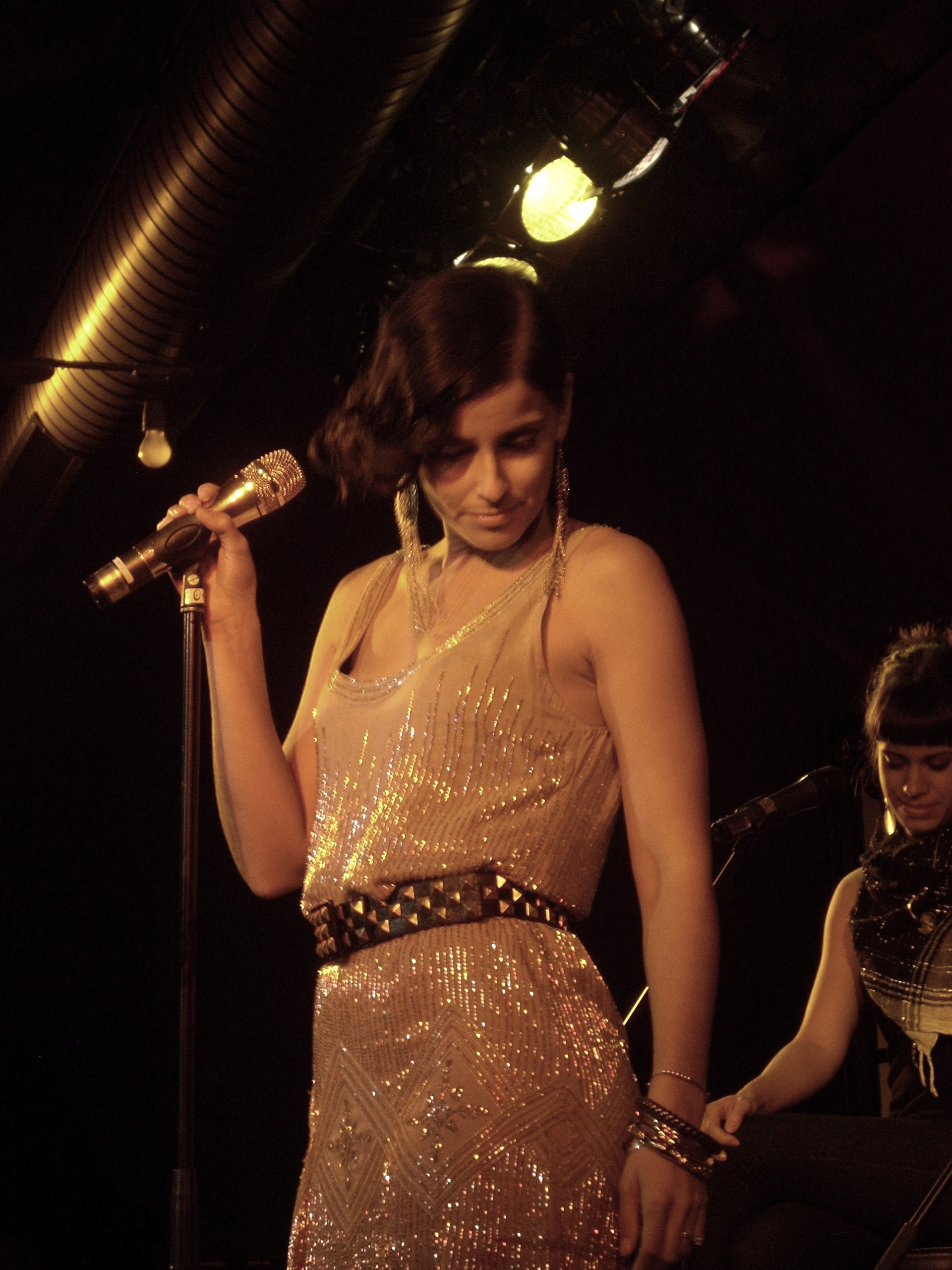
In early sessions, Lipa desired to create a sound mixing that of J. Cole and Nelly Furtado.

After meeting Mawson in 2013, Lipa was invited to writing sessions by him and Ed Millett, the co-owners of TAP; this happened while they were deciding whether to sign her. Mawson and Millett intended on having Lipa learn the songwriter trade with the help of a wide range of collaborators. She was more interested in "discovering" her sound at first than in landing a record deal; she wanted to have a sound like a cross between rapper J. Cole and Nelly Furtado, but the reaction of the producers was not very positive. Lipa was still working as a waitress and was not getting much sleep. Thus, Mawson and Millett gave her a monthly salary so she could quit her job and focus on songwriting. They organized an intense period of artist development where Lipa went into sessions five days a week with different writers until something came out of them.

Lipa found it difficult going into the early sessions because she did not know the writers and producers there. She thought it was difficult to open up to strangers. Lipa would attempt to get to know them before writing to make herself more comfortable. The singer also attempted to create only radio songs in early sessions, which limited her and stressed her out, resulting in her creativity lacking and an amount of pressure being put on her. Lipa eventually got over this and wrote about how situations made her feel; that is when she started writing the songs she enjoyed. When Lipa began writing, she had several ideas and knew how to get her thoughts out. However, she had trouble building a song so she enlisted the help of co-writers, many of which she became good friends with. She described it as a learning process and slowly became confident with her songwriting. As Lipa wrote more, she developed a skill for songwriting leading her to writing songs about situations relevant to her or her friends. The singer took some inspiration with her writing from the "dramas" she saw while working as a hostess and "the dark side of nightlife". She desired to create this idea with as "seductive and sweet but doesn't sugar-coat" what happens. Lipa stated that she wanted to bring "a bit more realness" speak the truth "about what being a teenager is really like" as before music was dominated with how amazing it was. In 2015, Lipa made four trips to Los Angeles to write songs; she got a palm tree tattoo on her left elbow to commemorate her first month of writing songs there. Songwriter Lucy Taylor gave Lipa "Be the One" before she had released any music; the singer was reluctant to record it due to the fact that she had not written it.

"Last Dance"
Lipa would often play "Last Dance" for producers she met with in order to give them an idea of her sound. The song was produced by Koz, whom Lipa formed a close partnership with.

Lipa formed a close partnership with producer Koz. She would often send him stuff that was just the piano and he would produce it and make it cohesive. Lipa recalled that he made everything easier for her and understood her vision for the album. Koz revealed that he was impressed by Lipa's unique vocals. Of the 25 original songs included on every edition of the album, Koz produced nine, including "Hotter than Hell" and "Thinking 'Bout You". They were the first two songs written for the album and were written in the early sessions arranged by Mawson and Millet. The former helped define what the album would sound like and helped the singer land her record deal with Warner Bros in 2014. Following this, Lipa went into many failed writing sessions attempting to recreate the song. She thought she needed more songs like it but eventually realized that she did not. That is when Lipa wrote "New Love" in New York and "Last Dance" in Toronto. The latter song also had a role in defining the sound of the album; Lipa stated that once she heard its finished version, she would take the song to producers and say "this is my sound".

=== Later writing sessions ===
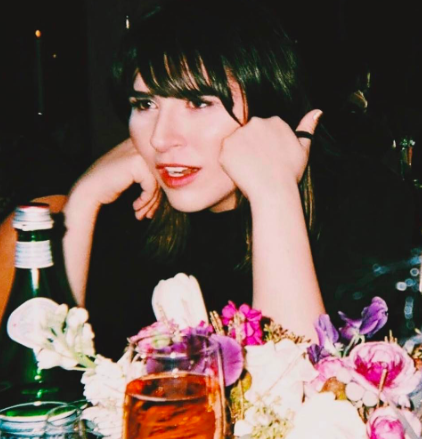
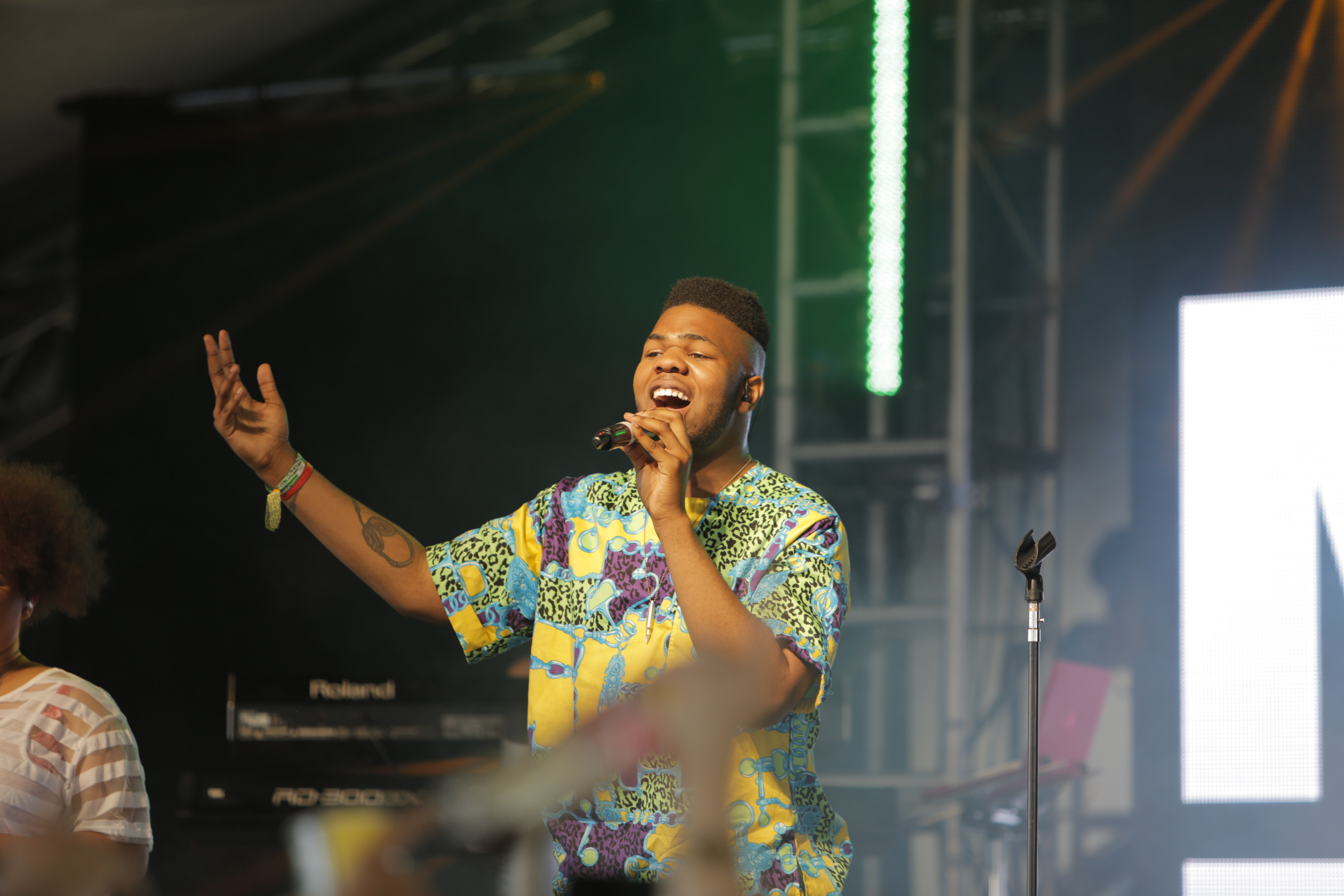
Emily Warren and MNEK co-wrote tracks on the album.

Lipa normally would write a song in one day, usually within two to three hours. Lipa would often go into studio sessions with an idea already in mind and beginning writing, slowly realizing how the lyrics has relevance in her life. She would also write notes and take them to the studio to write a song about them, only if the note was still relevant to her at the moment. As she cared more about the story, Lipa would make up melodies to fit around her lyrics and often change the melody so she could get all the words that she needed in the story. Lipa felt as though the writing sessions were her form of therapy. Aside from Cole and Furtado, Lipa took inspiration from artists including Sting, the Police, David Bowie, Radiohead, Stereophonics, Pink, Destiny's Child, Missy Elliott, Christina Aguilera, Method Man, Redman, 50 Cent, Snoop Dogg, Busta Rhymes, Kendrick Lamar, Schoolboy Q, and Chance the Rapper.

"No Goodbyes" was a personal song for Lipa to write; she described it as the hardest song for her to write on the album. She pre-empted the future when writing it as she was mourning a relationship she was still in, but hoping for the best. It took Lipa a while to have the courage to write it as she was worried the person she wrote it about would know it is about them. Lipa explained that she had been travelling a lot and letting that person down, where they were not living their lives while waiting for her. "For Julian" was written by Lipa and Eg White for Lipa's friend who was going through a hard period in their life. The song was not released digitally, however it appeared on the Japanese edition of the album.

=== Final sessions and overview ===
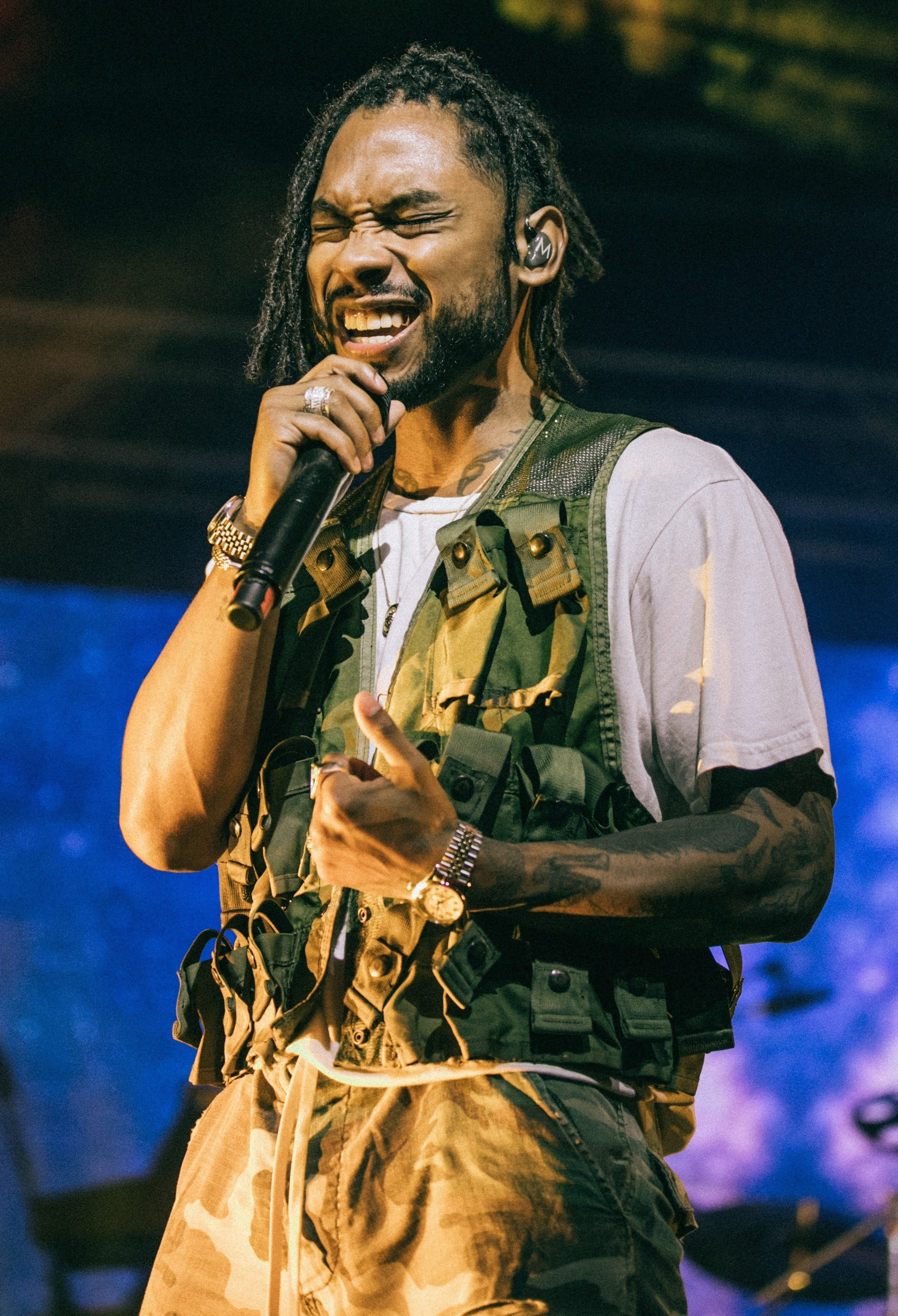
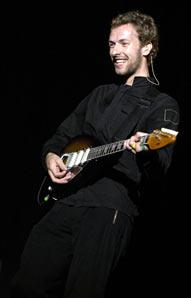
Collaborations with Miguel and Chris Martin were last-minute additions to the album.

Lipa co-wrote every song on all editions of the album excluding "Be the One", "New Rules", "Scared to Be Lonely" and "No Lie". She turned down several songs offered to her by other artists because she felt they did not fit her style. Mawson explained that these songs ended up being massive hits for other female artists. "Scared to Be Lonely" and "No Lie" were both offered to Lipa with Martin Garrix and Sean Paul both desiring a collaboration with her. Lipa wanted to finish the album before she put any music out so she could plan out the marketing campaign. However, the singer still went into studio sessions on off-days just in case she could write something else. The album was eventually pushed back as the singer got some exciting opportunities. Following this, Lipa added ten new songs to the album so she could showcase another side to her. She wrote upwards of 160 songs for the album, many of which were never finished as she was constantly writing new ones and expressing where she was in her life. Lipa also collaborated with Nineteen85, Darkchild, BloodPop and Noonie Bao, but none of the songs made it onto the album. She would often remove a song from the album then re-add it.

Lipa took two trips to Los Angeles when finishing the album where "IDGAF", "Lost in Your Light", "Homesick" and "Begging" were written. The trips solidified and closed the album for the singer. Also during those trips, Ian Kirkpatrick played Lipa "New Rules" which led to her recording it. "Lost In Your Light" and "Homesick" are collaborations with Miguel and Coldplay frontman Chris Martin, both of whom Lipa was a fan of. The album was finished on 20 March 2017 and was created in studios between Berlin, London, Los Angeles, New York, Stockholm and Toronto. As Lipa spent a lot of time on the album attempting to perfect it, she got the word "patience" tattooed to remind herself to wait until everything in perfect. Work on the Complete Edition continued throughout 2018, where "One Kiss" with Calvin Harris, "Electricity" with Silk City, and "Kiss and Make Up" with Blackpink were recorded. The latter song was originally intended to be a solo song for Lipa, however, the singer decided to add the band to it after members Jennie and Lisa attended her concert in Seoul.

== Music and lyrics ==
=== Overview ===
Musically, Dua Lipa is a dance-pop, electropop and R&B album, with disco, hip hop and tropical house elements. Lipa describes the album's sound as dark pop, progressive pop and "dance-crying". She explained that the sound embodied hip hop-influenced verses with heavy flow and raw, truthful lyrics, alongside a big, simple pop chorus. Several of the songs stem from sad experiences; Lipa desired to mix darker lyrics with pop music one could dance to. She stated that listeners were often surprised when looking at the lyrics due to the dance sound of the songs. The singer concluded by mentioning that honesty is the key to the sound. The album is very diverse and explores several different genres. The album balances between upbeat empowerment songs and stripped-back songs about real emotion.

Dua Lipa avoids overproduction and uses electronic instrumentation alongside thick synthesizers, detailed percussion and complex melodies. The beats used on the album are influenced by clubby pop and have a soulful deep house pulse. Lipa uses husky and powerful rock vocals. The lyrics deal with themes of female empowerment, relationships, heartbreak, love and loss, all of which are inspired by sadness. Lipa never wanted the lyrics to come off as submissive or weak rather empowering. She described vulnerability as something different that is included in the album. Additionally, it has themes of self-identification and using Lipa's experiences and realizations to brave the universal portents and predicaments of love. She also sings about the depressing and imploring qualities of a breakup. Several songs on the album contain biblical references and religious imagery to showcase the ups and downs of relationships.

=== Songs ===
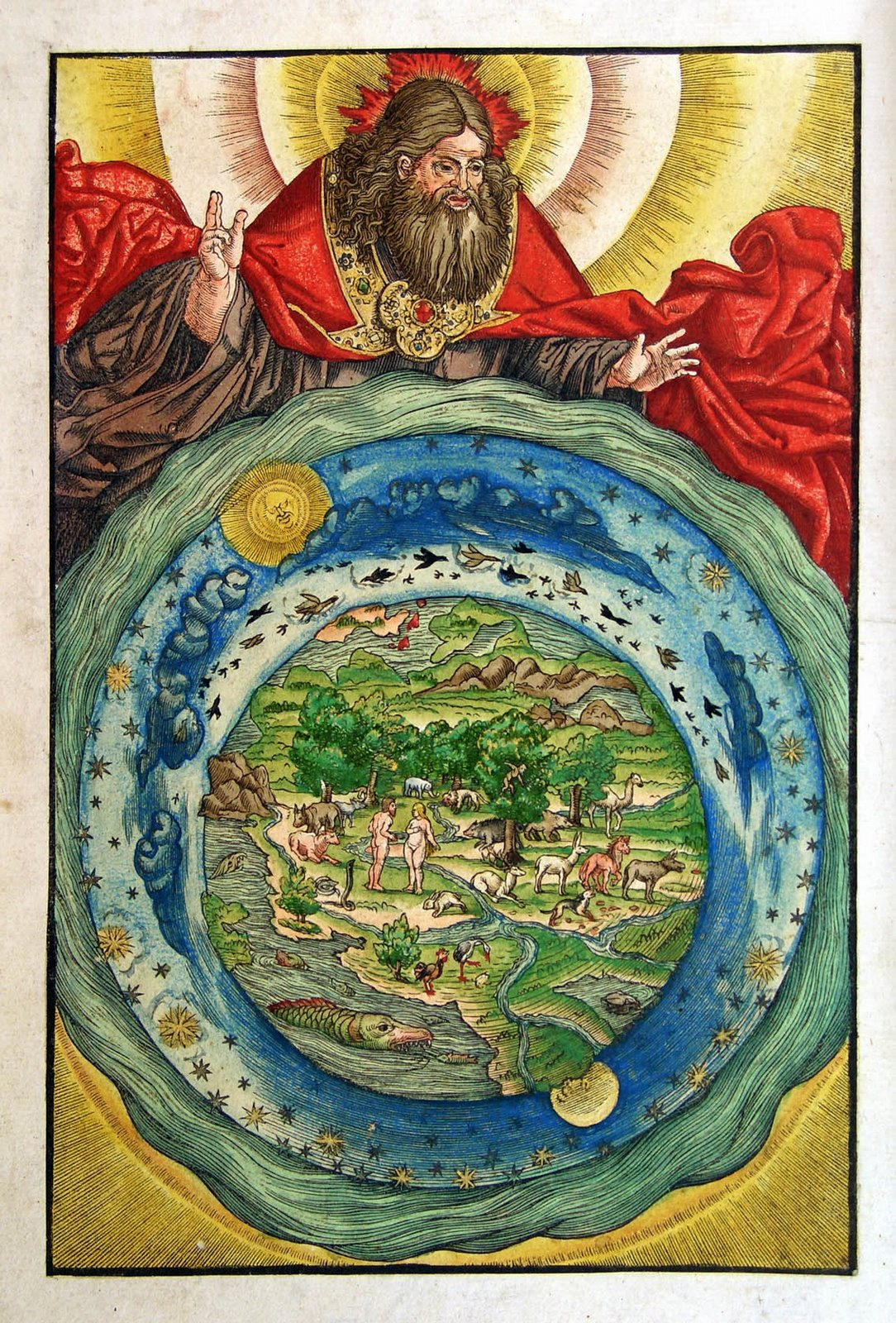
"Genesis" quotes and gets its title from the first book of the bible, which it shares a name with.

Dua Lipa opens with "Genesis", a 1980s-styled R&B slowburner set to an electro-guitar. The song gets its title from the first book of the bible and quotes Genesis 1 in the opening line: "in the beginning, God created Heaven and Earth". Vocally, Lipa accentuates and elongates certain lyrics while the lyrics see Lipa re-assessing a relationship. She apologizes to her partner for the complications that come with fame and longs for the honeymoon period of the relationship, realizing that people are in a constant state of change. Electropop track "Lost In Your Light" sees Lipa duetting with Miguel. It features a disco-tinged sway, electro rhythms and percussion-heavy beats alongside a hip hop middle eight. Described by Lipa as "one of the happiest" songs on the album, the lyrics see the singers discussing how one can get lost in the middle of all the emotions at the beginning of a relationship. In "Hotter than Hell", Lipa taunts an ex-boyfriend and takes revenge on him for his actions, showcasing empowerment and heartache themes. It is a dance-pop, electropop and tropical house track driven by marimbas and synthesizers, that features church organs and bongos. The song quotes Arctic Monkeys' "505" from their album Favourite Worst Nightmare (2007).

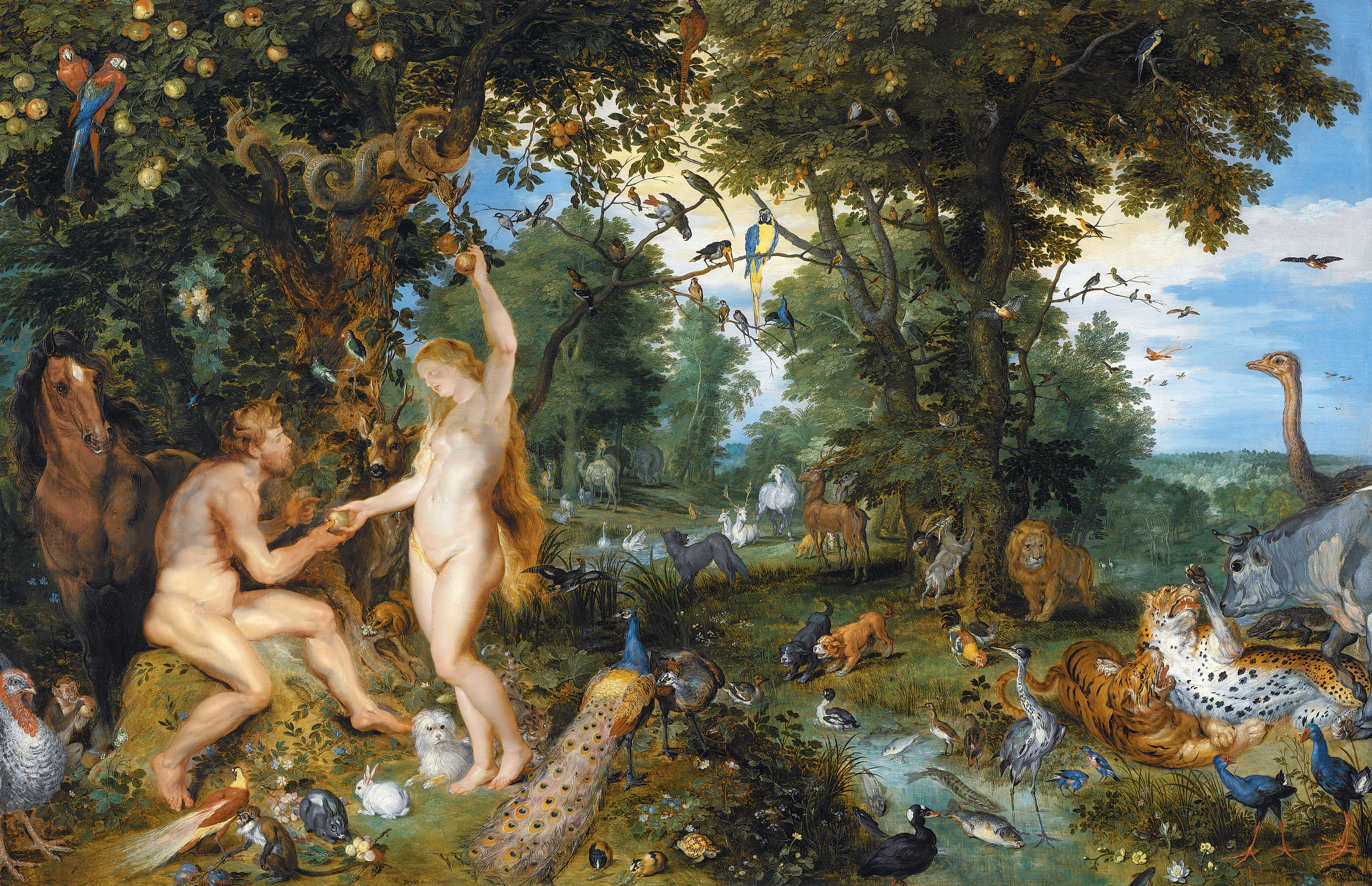
"Garden" references Adam and Eve leaving the Garden of Eden, using it as a metaphor to describe a breakup.

"Be the One" is a dream pop, Europop and synth-pop track that Lipa described as about "self belief, perseverance, and fighting for what you want". With lyrics about the miscommunication in a relationship, the song sees Lipa pleading for her lover to take her back for good. The song's production features tropical R&B beats, 1980s-styled grooves and electropop riffs. "IDGAF", an acronym for "I don't give a fuck", is a pop song set to an electric guitar riff and militaristic drums. In the lyrics, Lipa makes sure her ex knows she is not thinking of him after he attempts to rekindling things with her. Inspired by Lipa's unsuccessful modeling career, "Blow Your Mind (Mwah)" is about rejecting people who want others to change and having the upper hand in a relationship. It is categorized as a futuristic disco and electropop track with tropical beats. Lipa uses indietronica vocals and blows a kiss at the end of the chorus. "Garden" uses the metaphor of Adam and Eve leaving the Garden of Eden to describe a breakup and Lipa longing for the idyllic parts of a relationship. It sees the singer acting as a reflective girlfriend at the end of the relationship as the religious imagery is juxtaposed with betrayal themes. Musically, the song is a soulful, Eurovision-styled, melodramatic power ballad with a stormy production and apocalyptic percussion.

"No Goodbyes" is a dark song with dance elements that starts off slowly, where Lipa uses a breathy vocal style. The song's lyrics discuss a relationship destined to fail, showing a vulnerable side to the album. "Thinking 'Bout You" is a stripped-back, acoustic R&B and retro-soul ballad driven by an acoustic guitar. The song sees Lipa attempting to forget about a past romance. In "New Rules", Lipa gives herself a set of rules to prevent her from getting back with an ex-boyfriend. An electropop and tropical house song, it features an EDM production that makes use of a dancehall rhythm and bashment elements. "Begging" is a synth-heavy song with a modern production, containing upbeat melodies, dramatic piano chords and 1980s elements. The standard edition of Dua Lipa closes with "Homesick", a piano ballad duet with Martin. The lyrics discuss being away from loved ones in order to pursue one's dream.

==== Bonus tracks ====
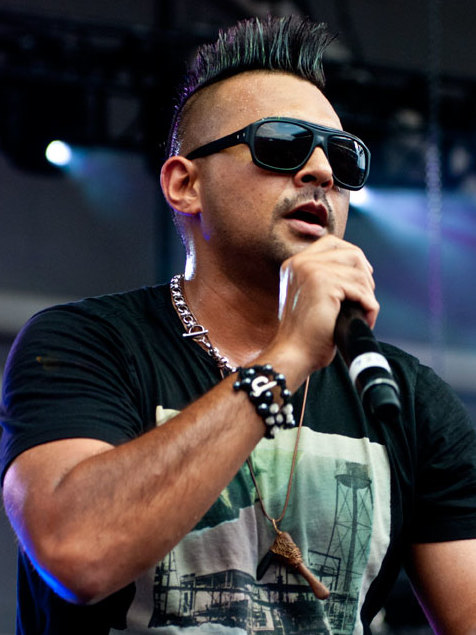
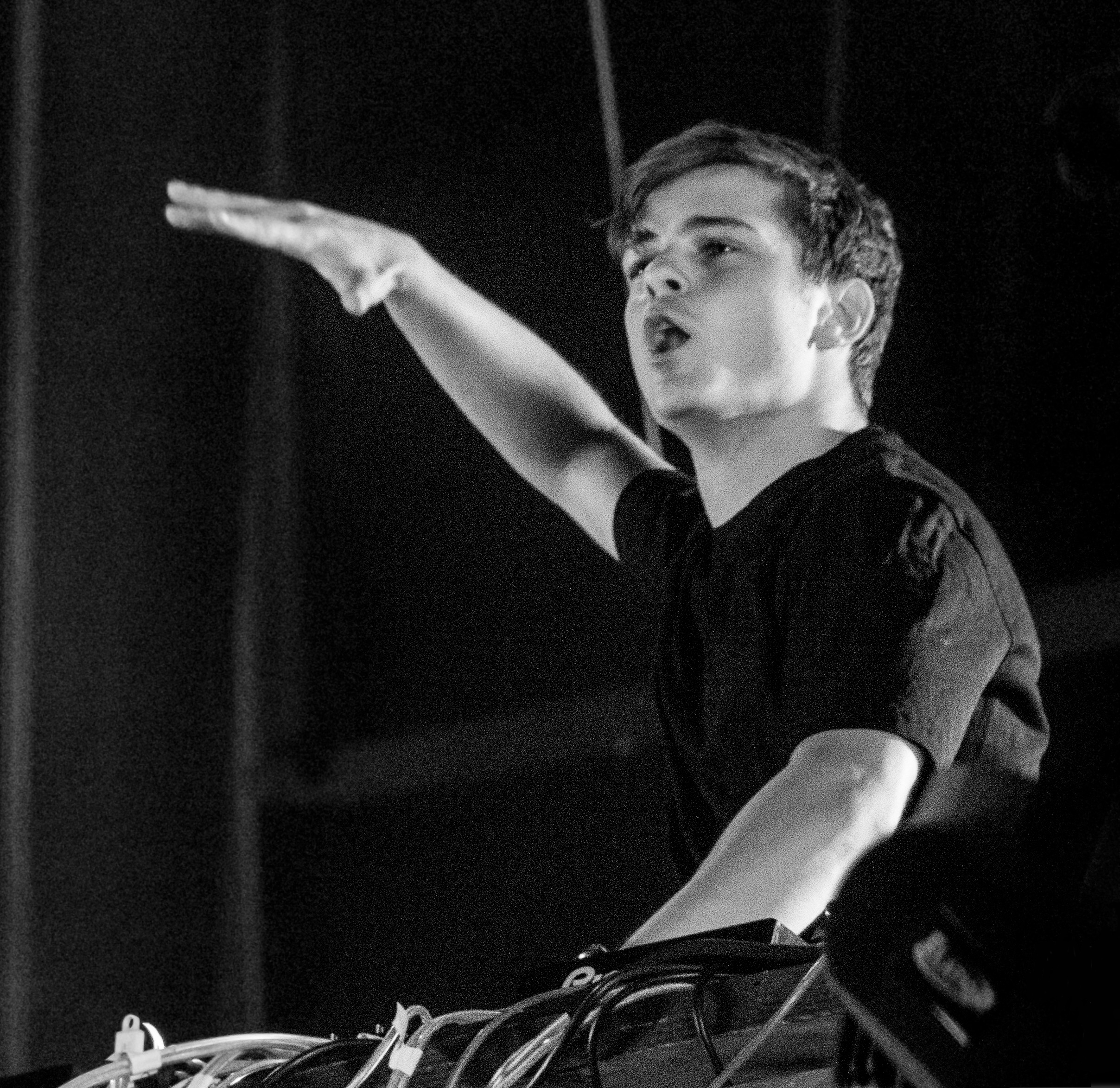
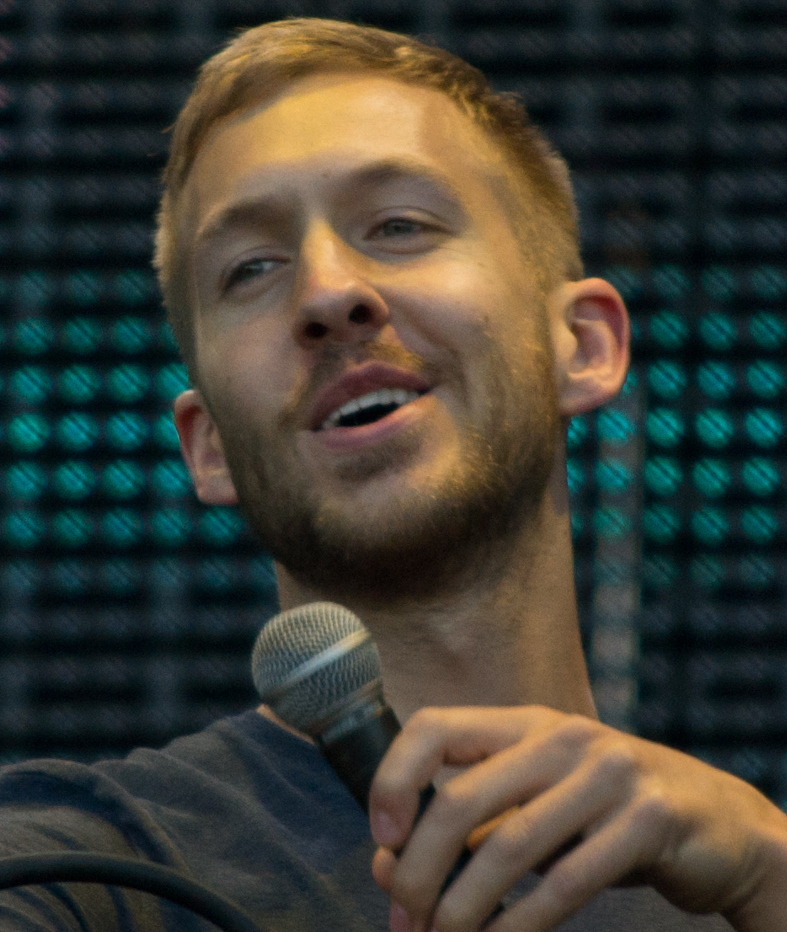
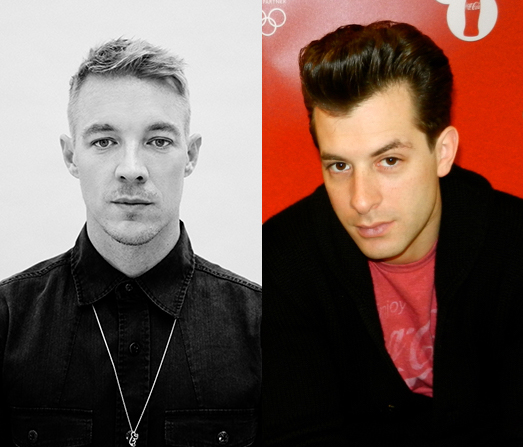
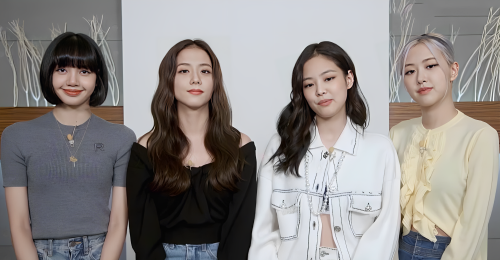
The Complete Edition of the album includes collaborations with Sean Paul, Martin Garrix, Calvin Harris, Silk City (Diplo and Mark Ronson), and Blackpink.

The first new track on the deluxe edition of Dua Lipa is "Dreams", an island-inflected dance track with a modern production containing horns, heavy synthesizers and 1980s elements. Lipa described "Room for 2" as a "scary kid's nursery rhyme". It is a dark ballad driven by a piano. "New Love" is a synth-pop song set to a tribal drum beat, with neo soul and R&B elements. Lipa described its meaning as "facing the fear of losing the only thing that matters to you". The lyrics of "Bad Together" discuss great sex and see Lipa asking for divine forgiveness for her sins in the chorus. The production contains electronic pings and African drums. "Last Dance", the final deluxe edition track, is a chillwave, dance-pop and post-EDM track with a glitchy, tribal production that uses house synthesizer chords. In the song, Lipa sings about a relationship that could end suddenly. Japanese bonus track "For Julian" is a slow, jazz-inspired song about God answering one's prayers.

The first new track on Dua Lipa: Complete Edition, "Want To", is a robo-pop song where Lipa uses electro vocals over moody synths. The song showcases the singer braving the universal portents and predicaments of love. "Running" is set to an R&B piano and tells a story of wounded pride, while her vocals have strong accompaniments. Lipa's collaboration with Blackpink, "Kiss and Make Up", is a blend of dance, electropop, and reggaeton genres, that makes use of bass synths and vocoders. Lyrically the song is about using physical affection to resolve a fight between two lovers with lyrics in English and Korean. In "One Kiss" with Harris, Lipa sings about using a kiss to trigger intense lust between two lovers. It is a dance-pop, diva house and tropical house track that makes use of brass instrumentation. "Electricity", her dance-pop and piano house collaboration with Silk City, draws from Chicago house and 1990s music; it sees Lipa using gospel house vocals and telling a story of two lovers with a kindred spirit. The retro-pop production consists of disco strings and soulful piano stabs. Future bass track "Scared to Be Lonely", a collaboration with Garrix, has an emotive tone. It uses electronic strings and hi-hats in its production, while Lipa ponders whether a relationship is legit. Paul's song "No Lie" featuring Lipa is a blend of reggae and tropical pop genres. The song is about Paul's attraction to a woman in a club scene.

== Marketing ==
=== Title and artwork ===
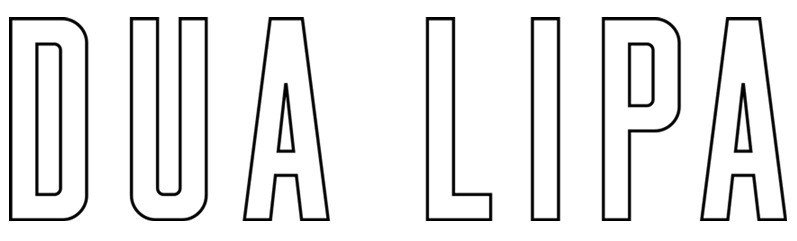
The Dua Lipa album logo used during the album's campaign.

In July 2016, the cover art for Dua Lipa was revealed, however, it received negative reviews from fans with many petitioning for it to be changed. The following month, Lipa announced the album's title and revealed the revised standard edition cover art and thanked her fans for being "patient and supportive" during the time. Rachel Sonis of Idolator described the cover art as "minimal yet smoldering" and it features the singer in a scaly jacket, staring into the camera with wet hair covering one side of her face over a blue-purple background. Lipa explained the title by saying "the reason it is self-titled is because this album is me. It's a representation of who I am as a person and as an artist". Other editions of the album use the same cover art with different backgrounds; the deluxe edition uses a purple background while the Complete Edition uses a glittery background.

=== Release ===
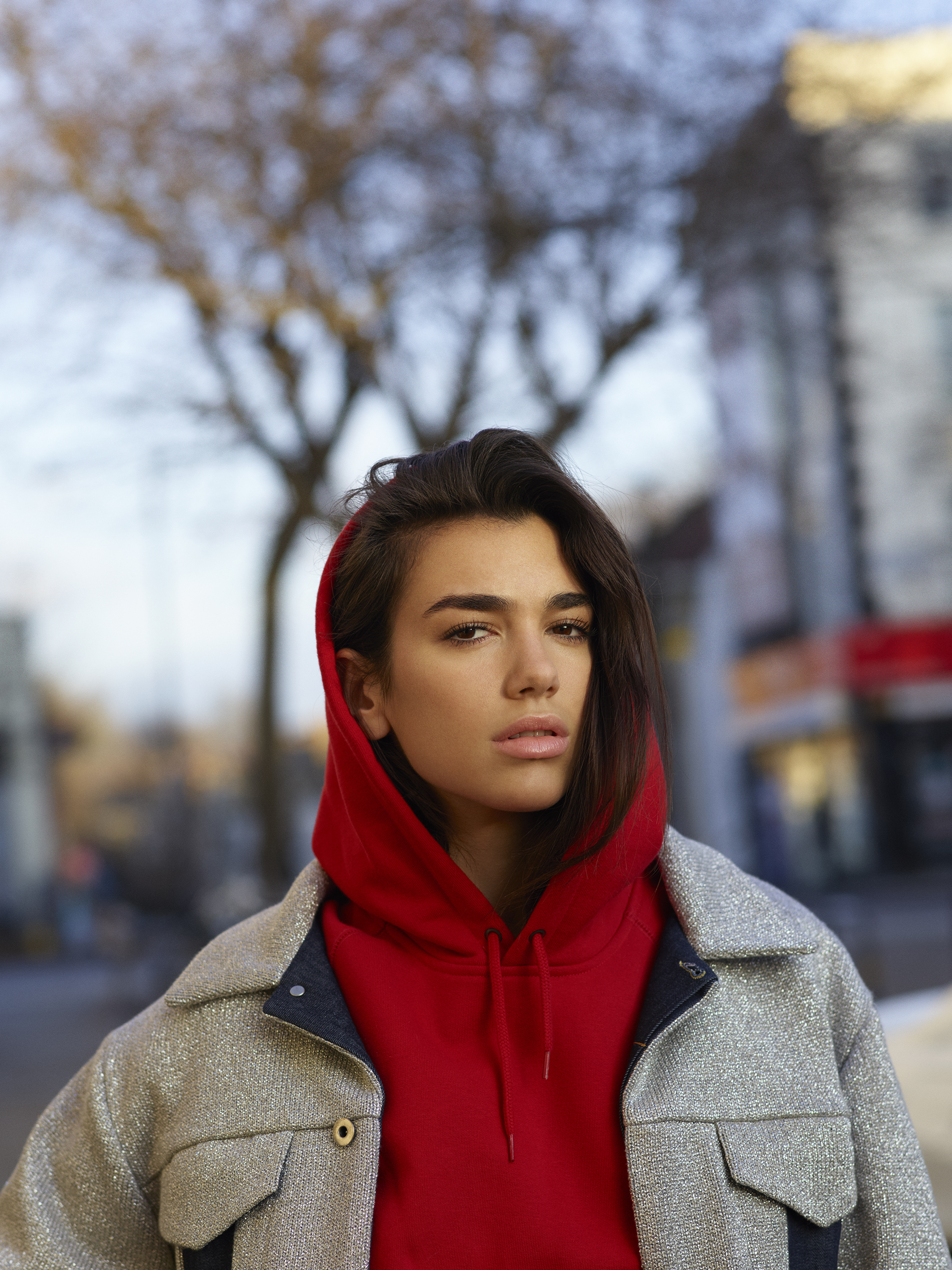
Lipa in the album's press photoshoot

In August 2015, Lipa released her debut single "New Love" as the lead single from Dua Lipa. The second single "Be the One" was released on 30 October 2015 alongside the album's confirmation. The song was her breakthrough single and became a sleeper hit across Europe and Oceania. It also became Lipa's first solo top 10 single in the UK, where it peaked at number nine. "Last Dance" and "Hotter than Hell" were released as singles the following year. The latter achieved moderate success and became her first UK Singles Chart entry where it peaked at number 15. In July 2016, it was revealed that Lipa had set 30 September of that year as the release date for her debut album. The following month, it was revealed that the album had been pushed back to 10 February 2017. On 24 August 2016, the singer formally announced the album. The deluxe edition of the album was made available for pre-order two days later alongside the release of "Blow Your Mind (Mwah)". The song became Lipa's first official single in the United States resulting in it becoming her first entry on the Billboard Hot 100 chart, reaching number 72; it also reached number 30 in the UK. "Room for 2" and "Thinking 'Bout You" were released as promotional singles on 28 October 2016 and 6 January 2017, respectively. Following the release of the latter song, Lipa delayed the album for a second time to June 2017 due to her desire to perfect it and to fit "new songs and exciting collaborations" on the album.

"Lost In Your Light" featuring Miguel was released as the final single prior to the album in April. The standard and deluxe editions of Dua Lipa were released on 2 June 2017. Two additional tracks were included on the Italian special edition of the album including Lipa's cover of Cher's "Bang Bang" which was used in her campaigns for Patrizia Pepe. A Japanese edition was released alongside the album and includes original song "For Julian"; it was later extended by the Japanese Special Edition. A 360 Reality Audio edition of the album was released in October 2020. "New Rules" and "IDGAF" were issued as singles following the album's release. Both became commercially successful and reached the top 10 of the UK Singles Chart. The former became Lipa's first UK number 1 single and her first Billboard Hot 100 top 10 entry. "Homesick" was released as a promotional single on 1 December 2017. The singer released a Deezer Sessions and Spotify Sessions extended play (EP) that feature live versions of songs on the album. A vinyl EP The Only with songs off the album was also released as well as Live Acoustic, an EP featuring covers by the singer.

==== Dua Lipa: Complete Edition ====
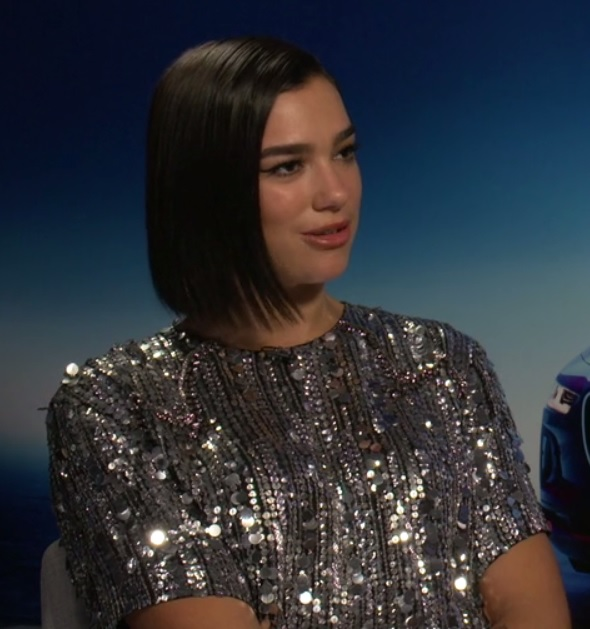
Lipa for Jaguar Cars for the release of Dua Lipa: Complete Edition

Following the album's release, Lipa teased a reissue stating that she would be releasing live versions of fan-favourite tracks "Running" and "Want To", both of which were leaked. On 4 September 2018, she officially announced the reissue titled Dua Lipa: Complete Edition as the album's "super deluxe edition". The reissue includes two discs: the first containing the deluxe album and the second containing eight additional tracks including Lipa's previously released collaborations, "One Kiss" with Calvin Harris, "Electricity" with Silk City, "Scared to Be Lonely" with Martin Garrix and "No Lie" by Sean Paul featuring the singer. All four of the collaborations reached the top 15 of the UK Singles Chart and "One Kiss" spent eight weeks at its summit while also reaching the top of charts in over a dozen countries. The reissue was released on 19 October 2018 alongside an exclusive Japanese CD edition that includes five additional tracks.

Dua Lipa: Complete Edition was supported by two promotional singles, "Want To" and "Kiss and Make Up"; the former was released on 6 September 2018 and the latter was released alongside the reissue. "Want To" also promoted Lipa's I-Pace campaign with British car manufacturer Jaguar where users of the car could create remixes of the song based and how they drove as well as personalized remixes based on their Spotify streaming history. The remixes mixed up moods, tempos, arrangement and different musical styles, including dance, drum and bass, hip hop, orchestral and pop. The campaign was announced at a secret gig in Amsterdam where Lipa as well as celebrities such as Dutch model Doutzen Kroes and French actress Alix Bénézech created their own remixes by driving the car. Shortly thereafter, "Want To" became the most remixed song in history. Lipa later revealed that releasing the B-sides taught her to think of an album's life span differently and take full advantage of it.

=== Promotion ===
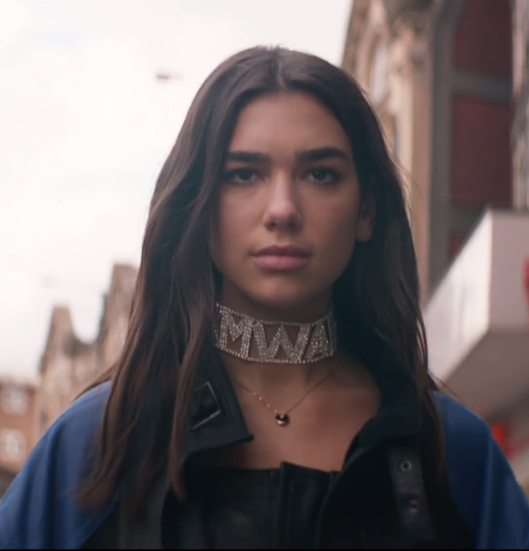
Lipa in the See in Blue documentary

Warner Bros. Records began promoting Lipa's campaign in 2014 when she signed with the label. The singer promoted her music through the use of social media as well as her campaigns with Adidas, MAC Cosmetics and Patrizia Pepe. In December 2016, she released a documentary short film produced by The Fader teamed up with YouTube Music and directed by Robert Semmer, titled See in Blue that details her music journey thus far. It featured an acoustic performance of "Genesis". For further promotion, Lipa gave several interviews for publications such as the American Broadcasting Company, the British Broadcasting Corporation, Billboard, The Observer, The Independent, The New York Times, NME, the Official Charts Company and Variety.

==== Live performances ====
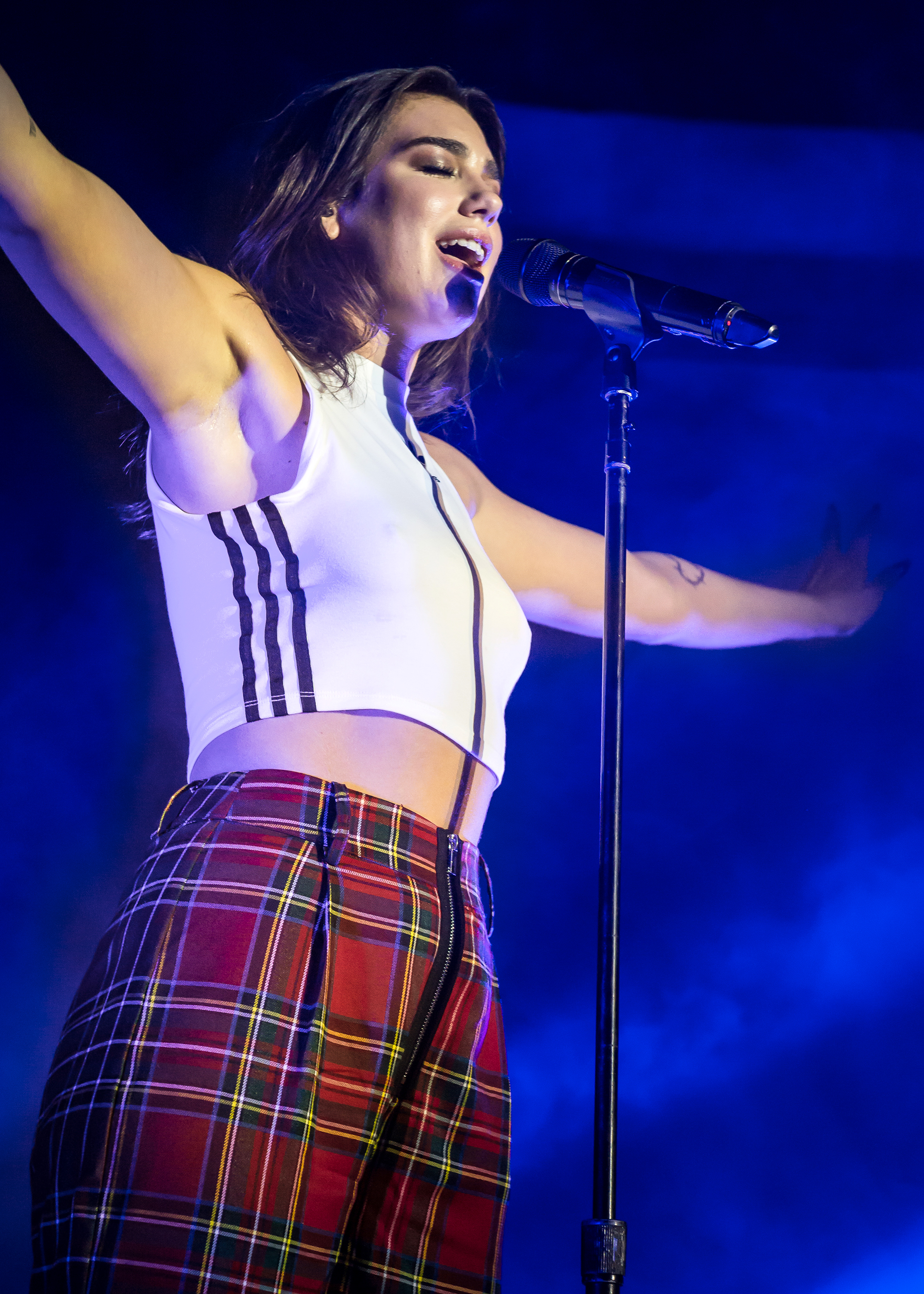
Lipa performing on the Self-Titled Tour in February 2018

Following the release of "New Love", Lipa began promoting her music and performing unreleased songs that she had not yet finished, before she had finished her debut album. Lipa gave her first live performance at a record label showcase in Berlin and her first festival performance at Eurosonic Noorderslag in the Netherlands in January 2016. She embarked on the 2016 UK Tour, Hotter than Hell Tour and US and Europe Tour throughout 2016 and 2017. She also served as an opening act for Troye Sivan on the Suburbia Tour, Bruno Mars on the 24K Magic World Tour and Coldplay on the A Head Full of Dreams Tour. The singer performed at awards showing including the American Music Awards, Billboard Music Awards, Brit Awards and Grammy Awards. Her appearances on television shows include Jimmy Kimmel Live!, Later... with Jools Holland, The Ellen DeGeneres Show, The Graham Norton Show, The Jonathan Ross Show, The Late Show With Stephen Colbert, The Tonight Show Starring Jimmy Fallon and Saturday Night Live.

The singer was part of the line-up for events including Capital FM's Summertime Ball and Jingle Bell Ball, as well as the Glastonbury Festival, iHeartRadio Music Festival, Jingle Ball Tour and UEFA Champions League Final. The singer headlined the Sunny Hill Festival in Pristina, which was organized by her father Dukagjin. The album's supporting tour, the Self-Titled Tour, ran from October 2017 to December 2018 and beginning in Brighton and concluding in Denver. (Note: The Self-Titled tour was originally intended to end on 22 September 2018 with Lipa's performance at the iHeartRadio Music Festival, however, a show in Denver took place on 10 December 2018 as Lipa was forced to cancel her previous show in the city on 26 June 2018 due to an ear infection.) She performed a total of 245 shows on the tour and tattooed the number on her back. During the live promotion, Lipa received backlash for her lack of stage presence while performing. A meme of her dancing went viral, which she later revealed affected her mental health stating "for a short period of time, it messed with my mental health. You know, I'd go on stage and if somebody was filming me, in my head, I wasn't, like, 'Oh, they're filming me because they want to keep it.' I was like, 'They're going to film it so they can laugh at me or something'".

== Critical reception ==
Professional ratings
Aggregate scores
Source	Rating
AnyDecentMusic?	6.8/10
Metacritic	72/100
Review scores
Source	Rating
AllMusic	4/5 stars
Clash	8/10
DIY	3/5 stars
Evening Standard	4/5 stars
Financial Times	3/5 stars
The Guardian	3/5 stars
The Line of Best Fit	7/10
musicOMH	3.5/5 stars
NME	4/5 stars
Q	3/5 stars

Dua Lipa received generally positive reviews from music critics. At Metacritic, which assigns a normalised rating out of 100 to reviews from mainstream publications, the album received an average score of 72, based on eight reviews. AnyDecentMusic? gave the album a 6.8 out of 10 from nine gathered reviews. For the Financial Times, Ludovic Hunter-Tilney noted that it is predominated by "upbeat dance-pop of impressively solid quality". Sean Ward of The 405 thought that the singer "has comfortably anchored herself in the category of pop innovator" with the album. Evening Standard's Rick Pearson said "this is high-quality stuff from an artist headed for the biggest of things".

In The Line of Best Fit, Claire Biddles said "this is a mostly compelling and wholly fun trip through modern pop with a charismatic protagonist, that hangs together way better than it should". Alex Green of Clash lauded Dua Lipa as "a debut album brimming with confidence, confidence not only in Lipa's own voice and her eye for a chorus, but in the emotive quality of her lyrics". Neil Z. Yeung of AllMusic praised the album as "a delightful collection of catchy pop gems where the songs only serve to highlight her vocal prowess" and "an excellent first effort from a budding pop star". Writing for NME, Jamie Milton wrote that Lipa's voice "could make the thickest synths seem tame in comparison and carries a 20-a-day raspiness capable of making heartfelt ballads sound edgy", adding that "it's equally impressive to hear how confidently the debut holds itself together, flitting between styles but always shining a spotlight on a legitimate pop sensation".

Ben Hogwood of musicOMH referred to Lipa's "powerful and distinctive" voice as "one of the most distinctive you will hear in pop music currently", while commenting that "the only potential issue with her approach lies in the production behind the songs". Hogwood concluded that "the hope is that her talents will get more room and less post-production time". Kate Solomon of Q magazine praised Lipa's voice as "very, very good" and opined, "What makes this album more than just a load of precision-engineered musical nothingness between a series of tentpole singles is Lipa herself. Songs that in other hands would be little more than throwaway filler swell into anthems for girls who can't stop falling in love". In a mixed review, The Guardian's Hannah J. Davies stated that "despite a few generic offerings", the album is "a solid pop debut that is high on summery nonchalance". DIY writer Alim Kheraj remarked that "across the album's 12 tracks there are bangers aplenty", but ultimately found that a lot of the album "feels overthought and calculated".

== Accolades ==
Lipa received numerous accolades for Dua Lipa, including a nomination for Album of the Year at the BBC Music Awards, a nomination for Foreign Pop/Rock Album or Soundtrack of the Year at the Hungarian Music Awards, and a win for International Album of the Year at the LOS40 Music Awards. In 2017, Lipa was nominated for the Critics' Choice award at the 2017 Brit Awards. At the 2018 Brit Awards, the album was nominated for British Album of the Year whilst "New Rules" received nominations for British Single of the Year and British Music Video of the Year; she won British Breakthrough Act and British Female Solo Artist at the ceremony. The following year, "IDGAF" and "One Kiss" were nominated for British Single of the Year and British Music Video of the Year; "One Kiss" won the former award. Lipa won Best New Artist at the 61st Annual Grammy Awards and "Electricity" won Best Dance Recording. Billboard ranked Dua Lipa as the 43rd best album of 2017 and it placed at number 35 on Complex's year-list. In Pitchfork, the album was placed at number 20 on their best pop and R&B of 2017 while Rolling Stone named it the year's ninth-best pop album.

== Commercial performance ==
Dua Lipa was a commercial success. It was a sleeper hit, reaching success internationally in 2018. In June 2017, Dua Lipa debuted at number five on the UK Albums Chart with first week sales of 16,223 units. In its 38th week, the album reached a peak of number three on the chart selling 9,518 units; it was boosted by the singer's appearance at the 2018 Brit Awards. Following the October 2018 release of the Complete Edition, the album jumped from number 56 to number nine on the chart with 7,651 units sold. In April 2021, the album spent its 200th week on the chart and it has not left it since its debut. Of that time, the album spent 179 weeks in the chart's top 40, making it the seventeenth album with the most weeks in the region. Dua Lipa was awarded 4× platinum certification from the British Phonographic Industry (BPI) in 2025. As of April 2021, the album has sales figures of 720,505 units in the country. On the UK Singles Chart, the album is tied in fifth for an album with the most top-10 singles with six. Nine songs on the album have been certified platinum or multi-platinum in the United Kingdom, while three songs have been certified silver.

In the United States, Dua Lipa debuted at number 86 on the Billboard 200 chart dated 24 June 2017. It departed the chart the next week, however, it re-entered at number 162 four weeks following. In February 2018, the album spent its 32nd week on the chart where it reached a peak of number 27 with 15,000 units sold. With boosting from the Complete Edition, the album jumped from number 129 to 42 on the chart in October of the same year. This resulted in it being awarded the "greatest gainer" accolade on the chart for that week. The album spent a total of 97 weeks on the chart. In June 2019, it was awarded a platinum certification from the Recording Industry Association of America (RIAA) for selling one million album-equivalent units in the US. In Canada, the album reached number 14 and was awarded a quadruple platinum certification from Music Canada for sales of 320,000 album-equivalent units in the country.

In Australia, Dua Lipa debuted at number 16 on the ARIA Albums Chart in June 2017, before reaching a peak of number eight the following April. It has spent over 100 weeks on the chart and was awarded a gold certification from the Australian Recording Industry Association (ARIA) for selling 35,000 album-equivalent units in the country. In New Zealand, the album reached the 7th position and had 30,000 album-equivalent unit sales, resulting in it being awarded a double platinum certification from the Recorded Music NZ (RMNZ). Additionally, the album has reached the top 10 of charts in the Flanders region of Belgium, Croatia, the Czech Republic, Denmark, the Netherlands, Greece, Ireland, Norway, Poland, Scotland and Sweden. It was also certified quadruple platinum in Norway and triple platinum in Brazil. In October 2018, Dua Lipa became the most-streamed album by a female artist on Spotify, and has been streamed over fourteen billion times. As of February 2021, the album has sold six million units worldwide.

== Track listing ==
Standard edition
No.	Title	Writer(s)	Producer(s)	Length
1.	"Genesis"	Dua Lipa; Andreas Schuller; Sarah Hudson; Coffee	Axident; Big Taste^{[a]}; Lorna Blackwood^{[b]}	3:25
2.	"Lost in Your Light" (featuring Miguel)	Lipa; Miguel; Rick Nowels	Miguel; Stephen "Koz" Kozmeniuk; Blackwood^{[c]}	3:23
3.	"Hotter than Hell"	Lipa; Adam Midgley; Tommy Baxter; Gerard O'Connell	Kozmeniuk; Jay Reynolds^{[a]}; Tom Neville^{[c]}	3:07
4.	"Be the One"	Lucy Taylor; Digital Farm Animals; Jack Tarrant	Digital Farm Animals; Tarrant^{[c]}	3:22
5.	"IDGAF"	Lipa; MNEK; Larzz Principato; Skyler Stonestreet; Whiskey Waters	Kozmeniuk; Principato^{[d]}; Blackwood^{[c]}	3:37
6.	"Blow Your Mind (Mwah)"	Lipa; Jon Levine; Lauren Christy	Levine	2:58
7.	"Garden"	Lipa; Greg Wells; Sean Douglas	Wells; Kozmeniuk	3:47
8.	"No Goodbyes"	Lipa; Dan Traynor; Lindy Robbins; Ilsey Juber	Kozmeniuk; Grades^{[d]}	3:36
9.	"Thinking 'Bout You"	Lipa; Adam Argyle	Kozmeniuk	2:51
10.	"New Rules"	Caroline Ailin; Emily Warren; Ian Kirkpatrick	Kirkpatrick	3:29
11.	"Begging"	Lipa; Cara Salimando; James Flannigan; Gabriel Simon	Flannigan; Kozmeniuk^{[a]}; Suzy Shinn^{[b]}	3:14
12.	"Homesick"	Lipa; Chris Martin	Bill Rahko	3:50
Total length:				40:43

Deluxe edition
No.	Title	Writer(s)	Producer(s)	Length
13.	"Dreams"	Lipa; Neville; Chelcee Grimes	Ten Ven	3:40
14.	"Room for 2"	Lipa; Neville; Autumn Rowe	Ten Ven	3:28
15.	"New Love"	Lipa; Emile Haynie; Andrew Wyatt	Haynie; Wyatt	4:31
16.	"Bad Together"	Lipa; Grimes; Tom Barnes; Ben Kohn; Peter Kelleher	TMS	3:58
17.	"Last Dance"	Lipa; Kozmeniuk; Talay Riley	Kozmeniuk	3:48
Total length:				60:08

Complete Edition (disc two)
No.	Title	Writer(s)	Producer(s)	Length
1.	"Want To"	Lipa; Amish Dilipkumar Patel; Andrew Jackson	ADP; Kozmeniuk	3:31
2.	"Running"	Lipa; Wyatt	Kozmeniuk	3:41
3.	"Kiss and Make Up" (with Blackpink)	Lipa; Grimes; Yannick Rastogi; Zacharie Raymond; Mathieu Jomphe-Lepine; Marc Vincent; Teddy Park	Banx & Ranx	3:09
4.	"One Kiss" (with Calvin Harris)	Adam Wiles; Jessie Reyez; Lipa	Harris	3:34
5.	"Electricity" (with Silk City)	Mark Ronson; Thomas Wesley Pentz; Diana Gordon; Romy Madley Croft; Lipa; Philip Meckseper; Jacob Olofsson; Rami Dawod; Maxime Picard; Clément Picard	Silk City; The Picard Brothers^{[a]}; Jarami^{[a]}; Riton^{[a]}; Alex Metric^{[a]}; Jr Blender^{[a]}	3:58
6.	"Scared to Be Lonely" (with Martin Garrix)	Martijn Garritsen; Georgia Ku; Nathaniel Campany; Kyle Shearer; Giorgio Tuinfort	Garrix; Valley Girl; Tuinfort; Blackwood	3:40
7.	"No Lie" (with Sean Paul)	Jackson; Warren; Jamie "Sermstyle" Sanderson; Philip "Pip" Kembo; Sean Paul Henriques	Sermstyle; Pip Kembo^{[d]}	3:41
8.	"New Rules" (live)	Ailin; Warren; Kirkpatrick	Reynolds; Will Bowerman^{[d]}	4:35
Total length:				29:53

=== Notes ===
- ^{^[a]} signifies an additional producer
- ^{^[b]} signifies an additional vocal producer
- ^{^[c]} signifies a vocal producer
- ^{^[d]} signifies a co-producer
- "Homesick" features additional vocals by Chris Martin.
- The Italian special edition includes the exclusive bonus track "Bang Bang" as track 13.
- The Japanese edition includes "Hotter than Hell" (Miike Snow remix) and "For Julian".
- The Japanese special edition includes "New Rules" (Initial Talk remix), "IDGAF" (Initial Talk remix), and "IDGAF" (Hazers remix).

== Personnel ==
=== Standard editions ===
Musicians

- Dua Lipa – vocals, backing vocals, songwriting
- Andreas Schuller – keyboards, percussion
- Leroy Clampitt – guitar
- Miguel – drums, percussion, bass, vocals
- Rick Nowels – electric guitar, keyboards
- Stephen "Koz" Kozmeniuk – guitar, drums, synths, keyboards, bass, piano, additional drums, synth programming, programming, backing vocals
- Dean Reid – percussion, synth bass, electric guitar, keyboards
- Mighty Mike – live drums
- Zac Rae – piano, synths
- Jay Reynolds – additional keyboards
- Aadin Church – backing vocals
- Talay Riley – backing vocals
- Lucy Taylor – backing vocals
- Jack Tarrant – guitar
- MNEK – additional backing vocals
- Todd Clark – additional backing vocals
- Larzz Principato – guitar
- Jon Levine – keyboards, Rhodes, bass, guitar, drum programming
- Greg Wells – piano, drums, bass, synths
- Grades – keyboards, programming, drums
- Adam Argyle – guitar
- Ian Kirkpatrick – programming
- Cara Salimando – backing vocals
- James Flannigan – piano, drums, drum programming, synth strings, percussion, programming
- Chris Martin – additional vocals, piano
- Tom Neville – percussion, programming, keyboards
- Tom Barnes – drums
- Pete Kelleher – keyboards
- Ben Kohn – guitar
- Matt Vlahovich – additional keyboards
- Eg White – electric guitar, sampler, synths, drum programming, wurlitzer, hammond

Technical

- Axident – production
- Big Taste – additional production
- Lorna Blackwood – additional vocal production, vocal production
- Cameron Gower Poole – additional vocal production, engineering
- Jeff Gunnell – engineering assistance
- Tim Burns – mixing
- John Davis – mastering
- Miguel – production
- Stephen "Koz" Kozmeniuk – production, additional production
- Manny Marroquin – mixing
- Chris Galland – mix engineering
- Jeff Jackson – mix engineering assistance
- Robin Florent – mix engineering assistance
- Kieron Menzies – engineering
- Dean Reid – engineering
- Trevor Yasuda – engineering
- Chris Garcia – engineering
- Chris Gehringer – mastering
- Jay Reynolds – additional production, mixing
- Tom Neville – vocal production
- Michael Sonier – engineering assistance
- Şerban Ghenea – mixing
- John Hanes – engineering for mix
- Digital Farm Animals – production
- Jack Tarrant – vocal production
- Evelyn Yard – recording
- Larzz Principato – co-production
- Josh Gudwin – mixing
- Joel Peters – engineering
- Jon Levine – production, engineering
- Greg Wells – production, engineering
- Grades – co-production, vocal recording
- Matty Green – mixing, mastering
- Olly Thompson – engineering assistance
- Ian Kirkpatrick – production, vocal production, engineering
- James Flannigan – production
- Suzy Shinn – additional vocal production
- Matt Deutchman – production co-ordination
- Bill Rahko – production, engineering
- Jordan "DJ Swivel" Young – mixing
- Aleks von Korff – engineering assistance
- Ten Ven – production
- Emile Haynie – production
- Andrew Wyatt – production
- Ike Schultz – mixing assistance
- TMS – production
- Eg White – production, engineering

=== Dua Lipa: Complete Edition ===
Musicians

- Dua Lipa – vocals
- Stephen Kozmeniuk – synthesizer, bass, drums
- Andrew Wyatt – piano
- Blackpink (Note: Jennie Kim, Jisoo Kim, Lalisa Manoban and Roseanne Park) – vocals
- Banx & Ranx (Note: Yannick Rastogi and Zacharie Raymond) – drums, bass, synths, keys
- Chelcee Grimes – backing vocals
- Silk City (Note: Diplo and Mark Ronson) – instrumentation
- The Picard Brothers (Note: Maxime Picard and Clément Picard) – instrumentation
- Jr Blender – instrumentation
- Jacob Olofsson – instrumentation
- Frank van Essen – arrangement, violin, strings
- Sean Paul – vocals
- Ciara O'Connor – backing vocals
- Naomi Scarlett – backing vocals
- William Bowerman – musical director, arranger, drums
- Matthew Carroll – bass guitar, keyboards
- Kai Smith – guitar, keyboards

Technical

- ADP – production, engineering, programming
- Stephen Kozmeniuk – production, drum programming, programming
- Jamie Snell – mixing
- Chris Gehringer – mastering
- Matty Green – mixing
- John Davis – mastering
- Banx & Ranx – production, programming
- Yong In Choi – engineering
- Calvin Harris – production, mixing
- Mike Marsh – mastering
- Silk City – production, programming
- The Picard Brothers – additional production, programming
- Jarami (Note: Jacob Olofsson and Rami Dawod) – additional production, programming
- Riton – additional production
- Alex Metric – additional production
- Jr Blender – additional production, programming
- Josh Gudwin – mixing
- Hunter Jackson – mixing assistance
- Will Quinnell – mastering assistance
- Martin Garrix – production, engineering
- Giorgio Tuinfort – production
- Valley Girl – production
- Lorna Blackwood – production
- Cameron Gower-Poole – engineering
- JP Negrete – engineering
- Sermstyle – production
- Pip Kembo – co-production
- Paul Bailey – engineering
- James Royo – mixing
- Barry Grint – mastering
- Jay Reynolds – production, mixing
- William Bowerman – co-production
- Will Nicholson – engineering, recording, front of house
- Jon Bond – backline technician
- Alex Cerutti – monitors
- Richie Mills – backline technician

== Charts ==
=== Weekly charts ===
Weekly chart performance
Chart (2017–2020)	Peak position
Australian Albums (ARIA)	8
Austrian Albums (Ö3 Austria)	36
Belgian Albums (Ultratop Flanders)	6
Belgian Albums (Ultratop Wallonia)	19
Canadian Albums (Billboard)	14
Croatian International Albums (HDU)	4
Czech Albums (ČNS IFPI)	5
Danish Albums (Hitlisten)	5
Dutch Albums (Album Top 100)	6
Estonian Albums (Eesti Tipp-40)	6
Finnish Albums (Suomen virallinen lista)	11
French Albums (SNEP)	59
German Albums (Offizielle Top 100)	22
Greek Albums (IFPI)	6
Hungarian Albums (MAHASZ)	12
Irish Albums (IRMA)	3
Italian Albums (FIMI)	29
Japanese Albums (Oricon)	139
Latvian Albums (LaIPA)	15
Mexican Albums (AMPROFON)	20
New Zealand Albums (RMNZ)	7
Norwegian Albums (VG-lista)	8
Polish Albums (ZPAV)	8
Portuguese Albums (AFP)	15
Scottish Albums (Official Charts)	3
Slovak Albums (ČNS IFPI)	4
South Korean Albums (Circle)	93
South Korean Foreign Albums (Circle)	12
Spanish Albums (Promusicae)	11
Swedish Albums (Sverigetopplistan)	8
Swiss Albums (Schweizer Hitparade)	11
UK Albums (Official Charts)	3
US Billboard 200	27

=== Year-end charts ===
Year-end chart performance
Chart (2017)	Position
Belgian Albums (Ultratop Flanders)	65
Danish Albums (Hitlisten)	63
Dutch Albums (Album Top 100)	68
Norwegian Albums (VG-lista)	93
UK Albums (OCC)	42

Year-end chart performance
Chart (2018)	Position
Australian Albums (ARIA)	46
Belgian Albums (Ultratop Flanders)	8
Belgian Albums (Ultratop Wallonia)	139
Canadian Albums (Billboard)	24
Danish Albums (Hitlisten)	15
Dutch Albums (Album Top 100)	12
Estonian Albums (Eesti Tipp-40)	15
French Albums (SNEP)	140
Hungarian Albums (MAHASZ)	56
Icelandic Albums (Tónlistinn)	60
Irish Albums (IRMA)	9
Italian Albums (FIMI)	75
Mexican Albums (AMPROFON)	43
New Zealand Albums (RMNZ)	31
Portuguese Albums (AFP)	91
Spanish Albums (PROMUSICAE)	68
Swedish Albums (Sverigetopplistan)	26
UK Albums (OCC)	9
US Billboard 200	53

Year-end chart performance
Chart (2019)	Position
Australian Albums (ARIA)	22
Belgian Albums (Ultratop Flanders)	49
Dutch Albums (Album Top 100)	45
Irish Albums (IRMA)	16
New Zealand Albums (RMNZ)	42
UK Albums (OCC)	19

Year-end chart performance
Chart (2020)	Position
Australian Albums (ARIA)	32
Belgian Albums (Ultratop Flanders)	80
Irish Albums (IRMA)	22
UK Albums (OCC)	25

Year-end chart performance
Chart (2021)	Position
Australian Albums (ARIA)	39
Belgian Albums (Ultratop Flanders)	147
Irish Albums (IRMA)	31
UK Albums (OCC)	37

Year-end chart performance
Chart (2022)	Position
Australian Albums (ARIA)	41
Belgian Albums (Ultratop Flanders)	166
UK Albums (OCC)	47

Year-end chart performance
Chart (2023)	Position
Australian Albums (ARIA)	66
Belgian Albums (Ultratop Flanders)	199
UK Albums (OCC)	68

Year-end chart performance
Chart (2024)	Position
Australian Albums (ARIA)	69
Belgian Albums (Ultratop Flanders)	179
UK Albums (OCC)	64

Year-end chart performance
Chart (2025)	Position
Australian Albums (ARIA)	66
Belgian Albums (Ultratop Flanders)	131
UK Albums (OCC)	71

=== Decade-end charts ===
2010s decade-end charts for Dua Lipa
Chart (2010–2019)	Position
Dutch Albums (Album Top 100)	44

== Certifications ==
Certifications and sales
Region	Certification	Certified units/sales
Australia (ARIA)	Platinum	70,000^{‡}
Austria (IFPI Austria)	Platinum	15,000^{‡}
Belgium (BRMA)	Platinum	30,000^{‡}
Brazil (Pro-Música Brasil)	3× Platinum	120,000^{‡}
Canada (Music Canada)	6× Platinum	480,000^{‡}
Denmark (IFPI Danmark)	2× Platinum	40,000^{‡}
France (SNEP)	2× Platinum	200,000^{‡}
Germany (BVMI)	Gold	100,000^{‡}
Ireland (IRMA)	Platinum	15,000^{^}
Italy (FIMI)	2× Platinum	100,000^{‡}
Netherlands (NVPI)	Platinum	40,000^{‡}
New Zealand (RMNZ)	5× Platinum	75,000^{‡}
Norway (IFPI Norway)	4× Platinum	80,000^{‡}
Poland (ZPAV)	Gold	10,000^{‡}
Singapore (RIAS)	2× Platinum	20,000^{*}
Sweden (GLF)	Gold	20,000^{‡}
United Kingdom (BPI)	4× Platinum	1,200,000^{‡}
United States (RIAA)	2× Platinum	2,000,000^{‡}
^{*} Sales figures based on certification alone.^{^} Shipments figures based on certification alone.^{‡} Sales+streaming figures based on certification alone.

== Release history ==
Release dates and formats
Region	Date	Format(s)	Edition	Label	Ref.
Various	2 June 2017	CD; digital download; LP; streaming	Standard	Warner	
Various	2 June 2017	CD; digital download; streaming	Deluxe	Warner	
Japan	2 June 2017	CD	Japanese standard	Warner	
Italy	20 October 2017	CD	Special	Warner	
Japan	25 April 2018	CD	Japanese special	Warner	
Various	19 October 2018	CD; digital download; LP; streaming	Complete	Warner	
Japan	19 October 2018	CD	Japanese complete	Warner	

== See also ==
- List of Australian chart achievements and milestones
- List of albums which have spent the most weeks on the UK Albums Chart
- List of best-selling albums of the 2010s in the United Kingdom
