= All About You =

All About You or All About U may refer to:

== Film and television ==
- All About You (film), a 2001 American romantic comedy
- All About You (TV series), a 1970s American educational series
- All About You, a Philippine television series hosted by Miriam Quiambao

== Music ==
=== Albums ===
- All About You (album), by Jeremih, 2010
- 8701 (working title: All About U), by Usher, 2001

=== Songs ===
- "All About You" (The Knocks song), 2021
- "All About You" (Hilary Duff song), 2014
- "All About You" (Rolling Stones song), 1980
- "All About You" (Taeyeon song), 2019
- "All About You"/"You've Got a Friend", by McFly, 2005
- "All About You", by Against All Will from A Rhyme & Reason, 2009
- "All About You", by Enrique Iglesias from Final (Vol. 1), 2021
- "All About You", by Hoobastank from Fornever, 2009
- "All About You", by Ideal from Ideal, 1999
- "All About You", by Josh Turner from Deep South, 2017
- "All About You", by Nik Kershaw from You've Got to Laugh, 2006
- "All About You", by SWV from I Missed Us, 2012
- "All About You", by The Boyz, 2022
- "All About You", from the Bratz Rock Angelz film soundtrack, 2005
- "AllAboutYou", by Psy'Aviah from Eclectric, 2010
- "All About U", by Tupac Shakur from All Eyez on Me, 1996

== See also ==
- It's All About You (disambiguation)
