= That's What I Like About You (disambiguation) =

"That's What I Like About You" is a song popularized by Trisha Yearwood in 1991.

That's What I Like About You may also refer to:

- "That's What I Like About You" (Collette song), 1989
- "That's What I Like About You", a song by Al Bowlly, 1931
- "That's What I Like About You", a song by Dale and Grace, 1963
- "That's What I Like About You", a song by John Michael Montgomery from Brand New Me, 2000

== See also ==
- What I Like About You (disambiguation)
