= It's All About You =

It's All About You may refer to:

- It's All About You (EP), by Rebecca F. & The Memes, 2006
- "It's All About You" (Fawni song), 2012
- "It's All About You" (Juliana Pasha song), 2009
- "It's All About You (Not About Me)", a song by Tracie Spencer, 1999
- "It's All About You", a song by Status Quo from the album Quid Pro Quo, 2011
- "It's All About You", a 1999 episode from Bear in the Big Blue House
- It's All About You (film), a 2002 film by Mark Fauser

== See also ==
- All About You (disambiguation)
