= Think About You =

Think About You may refer to:

- "Think About You" (Luther Vandross song)
- "Think About You" (Guns N' Roses song)
- "Think About You" (Delta Goodrem song)
- "Think About You" (Kygo song)
- "Think About You", 2021 single by Raquel Cole

== See also ==
- I Think About You, a 1995 album by Collin Raye
- Thinking About You (disambiguation)
