= Lost in Your Light =

2017 Single by Dua Lipa featuring Miguel

- Remixes artwork

Single by Dua Lipa featuring Miguel

from the album Dua Lipa
- Released: 21 April 2017
- Recorded: 2016
- Studio: TaP / Strongroom 7 (London); Paramount (Los Angeles)
- Genre: Electropop
- Length: 3:23
- Label: Warner Bros.
- Songwriters: Dua Lipa; Miguel; Rick Nowels
- Producers: Miguel; Stephen "Koz" Kozmeniuk

Dua Lipa singles chronology
"Scared to Be Lonely" (2017)	"Lost in Your Light" (2017)	"New Rules" (2017)

Miguel singles chronology
"2 Love U" (2017)	"Lost in Your Light" (2017)	"Sky Walker" (2017)

Music video
- "Lost in Your Light" on YouTube

"Lost in Your Light" is a song by English singer Dua Lipa featuring American singer Miguel for Lipa's eponymous debut studio album (2017). The song was written by Lipa, Miguel and Rick Nowels, while production was handled by Miguel and Stephen Kozmeniuk. It was released for digital download and streaming as the album's sixth single on 21 April 2017 through Warner Bros. Records. It is an electropop song, encompassing dance-pop, power pop, R&B-pop and retro elements. The lyrics talk about feelings at the beginning of a relationship and getting lost in the middle of it all. The song was met with mixed reviews; music critics praised both the singers' vocals but had mixed opinions on Miguel's guest appearance. Some also complimented the lyrics.

"Lost in Your Light" peaked at number 86 on the UK Singles Chart and received a silver certification from the British Phonographic Industry (BPI). The music video was directed by Henry Schofield and premiered on YouTube on 26 May 2017. Filmed in Los Angeles, the video features Lipa and Miguel levitating above a parking lot while also dancing in it and on a rooftop. Lipa promoted the song with performances on BBC Radio 1's live lounge, Glastonbury Festival and BBC Radio 1's Big Weekend. Remixes by B-Case and DJ Rasimcan were released for further promotion.

== Background and composition ==
"Lost in Your Light" was written by Dua Lipa, Miguel, and Rick Nowels, and produced by Miguel and Stephen Kozmeniuk. Lipa was a fan of Miguel, and with her management reached out to Miguel for a studio session. They ended up writing the song in Los Angeles, as one of the last songs for Lipa's eponymous debut album. Lipa described it as "one of the happiest" songs from the album while also commenting on its meaning saying "it's about that feeling you get at the beginning of a relationship and those crazy emotions and getting lost in the middle of it all." The song was recorded at Paramount Studios in Los Angeles, while vocals were recorded at TaP Studio / Strongroom 7 in London. Mixing was done by Manny Marroquin at Larrabee Studios in North Hollywood, Los Angeles with Chris Gehringer mastering the song at Sterling Sound in New York City.

"Lost in Your Light"
An electropop song set to percussion-heavy beats, "Lost in Your Light" is about true infatuation.

Musically, "Lost in Your Light" is an electropop song, with dance-pop, power pop, R&B-pop and retro elements. It runs for 3 minutes and 23 seconds, and is constructed in verse–chorus form. The song is composed in 4/4 time and the key of D major, with a tempo of 118 beats per minute. The verses, choruses and middle eight follow a chord progression of G–G/A–A–A/B–Bm/D–D/F♯–Em7, while the bridges follow a F♯–Bm–Em–A sequence. The R&B production includes electro rhythms, percussion-heavy beats, strutting grooves, a disco-tinged sway, throbbing synths, and funky drum kit flourishes. The chorus contains dreamy harmonies, punchy percussion and hazy synths. The hip hop bridge unexpectedly changes the song, with the singers nearly rapping triplet rhythms over programmed beats. Lipa and Miguel harmonize with soulful vocals, spanning from A_{3} to F♯_{5}. Lyrically, the songs is a "mutual declaration of love" with lyrics about complete infatuation.

== Release and promotion ==
"Lost in Your Light" was released for digital download and streaming on 21 April 2017 in various countries by Warner Bros. Records as the sixth single from Lipa's debut album. It was later included as the second track on the album, released 2 June 2017; it appears as the 11th track on the Austrian, German and Swiss version of the album. Remixes by B-Case and DJ Rasimcan were released on 1 June 2017. The song was sent for radio airplay in Italy on 2 June 2017. Lipa was joined by Miguel to perform the song in the BBC Radio 1 live lounge, released 2 June 2017. She also performed the song at the 2017 Glastonbury Festival and BBC Radio 1's Big Weekend, on 23 June and 28 May, respectively.

== Critical reception ==
"Lost in Your Light" was met with mixed reviews from music critics. Olivia Craighead of The Fader labelled "Lost in Your Light" as a "pop banger," and praised its chorus as "catchy." Rap-Up commended the track for being a "feel-good jam", while praising Lipa and Miguel for their vocal performances. Tyler Schmitt of Variance and Idolator's Mike Wass both called the song "starry", with the latter complimenting the production and vocals. Stereogum's Tom Breihan had mixed feelings about Miguel's guest appearance, writing "he gives it his all", but said his voice "sounds better making smoky soul music". For The Line of Best Fit, Laurence Day called the song "a super-smooth, late-night duet with passionate pleas", and likened its "sensual side" for being different from Lipa's previous releases.

Bianca Gracie of Fuse appreciated the singers' "smooth-as-velvet" vocals and labelled the song "vibrant" and "lustful". DIY's Alim Kheraj criticized the song, writing that it is missing some of Lipa's personality. Sebas E. Alonso of Jenesaispop viewed that Robyn could have sung the song in Glee (2009–2015). The staff for The Singles Jukebox gave an average rating of 6.50. Maxwell Cavaseno praised Lipa's aim for the "Laura Branigan of 21st-century dance-rock." Ryan Reed from Rolling Stone regarded the song as "seductive" and Miguel's appearance as "passionate." The song was also placed at number 34 on Rolling Stone's "50 Best Songs of 2017" list, with the publication writing that it is "a starlit rollerskating jam about love's all-consuming joys," as well as saying the song "gets its kicks from its depths-plumbing groove and the crazy-in-love vocals of its two principals."

== Commercial performance ==
"Lost in Your Light" debuted and peaked at number 86 on the UK Singles Chart issue dated 28 April 2017. The song spent two non-consecutive weeks on the chart, re-entering at number 98 after the release of its parent album. In February 2020, it was awarded a silver certification from the British Phonographic Industry (BPI), for track-equivalent sales of 200,000 units. The song reached number 41 in Scotland and 97 in Ireland. In the Wallonia region of Belgium, the song reached number 24 on the Ultratip chart as well as peaking at number 2 on the Dutch Tipparade chart, number 10 on the New Zealand Heatseekers chart and number 62 on the Slovakia radio chart.

== Music video ==
Lipa and Miguel levitating above the parking lot in the music video

The music video for "Lost in Your Light" premiered via Lipa's YouTube channel on 26 May 2017. The video was directed by Henry Schofield and filmed in Los Angeles. The visual opens with Lipa walking down a street, where she turns a corner and walks into a parking lot. In the following scene, she begins to kick up her legs when three people join her performing spasmodic choreography. Lipa then stops at a Jeep, where she suddenly begins to levitate. She lands on a building where Miguel joins her. The singers later levitate off the building, before it becomes midnight and they land in the parking lot. A group of dancers join them, snapping their fingers. Lipa and Miguel are then seen walking towards each other on a ledge, before Lipa off falls backwards. The video closes with Lipa and Miguel dancing in daylight inside the parking lot, with the back up dancers.

Reed viewed the visual as "minimalist," while DIY called it "cinematic and romantic." In V, Carolyn Hanson praised the visual's surreality and wrote about the "otherworldly quality to both the auditory and visual experience." Popjustice complimented Lipa's wirework, writing that it looks as though she is actually flying, while also writing that she did a better job than Harry Styles in "Sign of the Times" (2017). For Vibe, Mark Braboy called the visual "alluring" and stated that it captures "pure dreamy romance" while also commending Lipa and Miguel's onscreen chemistry.

== Track listings ==
- Digital download and streaming
1. "Lost in Your Light" (featuring Miguel) – 3:23
- Digital download and streaming – remixes
1. "Lost in Your Light" (featuring Miguel) [B-Case remix] – 3:19
2. "Lost in Your Light" (featuring Miguel) [DJ Rasimcan remix] – 3:32

== Personnel ==
- Dua Lipa – vocals
- Miguel – production, drums, percussion, bass, vocals
- Rick Nowels – electric guitar, keyboards
- Stephen "Koz" Kozmeniuk – production, guitar, drums, synthesizer
- Mighty Mike – live drums
- Zac Rae – piano, synthesizer
- Dean Reid – engineering, percussion, synth bass, electric guitar, keyboards
- Kieron Menzies – engineering
- Trevor Yasuda – engineering
- Chris Garcia – engineering
- Lorna Blackwood – vocal production
- Manny Marroquin – mixing
- Chris Galland – mix engineering
- Jeff Jackson – mix engineering assistance
- Robin Florent – mix engineering assistance
- Chris Gehringer – mastering

== Charts ==
Chart performance for "Lost in Your Light"
Chart (2017)	Peak position
Belgium (Ultratip Bubbling Under Wallonia)	24
Ireland (IRMA)	97
Netherlands (Tipparade)	2
New Zealand Heatseekers (RMNZ)	10
Scottish Singles Sales (Official Charts)	41
Slovakia Airplay (ČNS IFPI)	62
UK Singles (Official Charts)	86

== Certifications ==
Certifications and sales for "Lost in Your Light"
Region	Certification	Certified units/sales
Canada (Music Canada)	Gold	40,000^{‡}
New Zealand (RMNZ)	Gold	15,000^{‡}
Poland (ZPAV)	Gold	25,000^{‡}
United Kingdom (BPI)	Silver	200,000^{‡}
^{‡} Sales+streaming figures based on certification alone.

== Release history ==
Release dates and formats for "Lost in Your Light"
Region	Date	Format(s)	Version	Label	Ref.
Various	21 April 2017	Digital download; streaming	Original	Warner Bros.	
Various	1 June 2017	Digital download; streaming	Remixes	Warner Bros.	
Italy	2 June 2017	Radio airplay	Original	Warner Bros.	
