= Homesick (Dua Lipa song) =

2017 single by Dua Lipa and Chris Martin

Promotional single by Dua Lipa

from the album Dua Lipa
- Released: 1 December 2017
- Studio: TaP / Strongroom 7 (London); Woodshed (Malibu)
- Length: 3:50
- Label: Warner Bros.
- Songwriters: Dua Lipa; Chris Martin
- Producer: Bill Rahko

Album visual
- "Homesick" on YouTube

"Homesick" is a song by English singer Dua Lipa from her eponymous debut studio album (2017). The song was written by Lipa and Coldplay frontman Chris Martin, who also contributes additional vocals. Martin's engineer Bill Rahko handled the production. The song was released by Warner Bros. Records for digital download and streaming on 1 December 2017 as the album's third promotional single. A week later, it was promoted to top 40 and adult contemporary radio formats in Belgium and the Netherlands.

"Homesick" is a piano ballad with its lyrics addressing being away from loved ones. Music critics complimented Lipa's vocals and its lyrics, but some thought the idea of a piano ballad felt forced. The song charted at number 12 in the Flanders region of Belgium and number 2 in the Netherlands. It was awarded a gold certification in Belgium and a silver certification in the United Kingdom. The song was promoted with performances on Later... with Jools Holland, Saturday Night Live and at the LOS40 Music Awards 2018.

== Writing and production ==
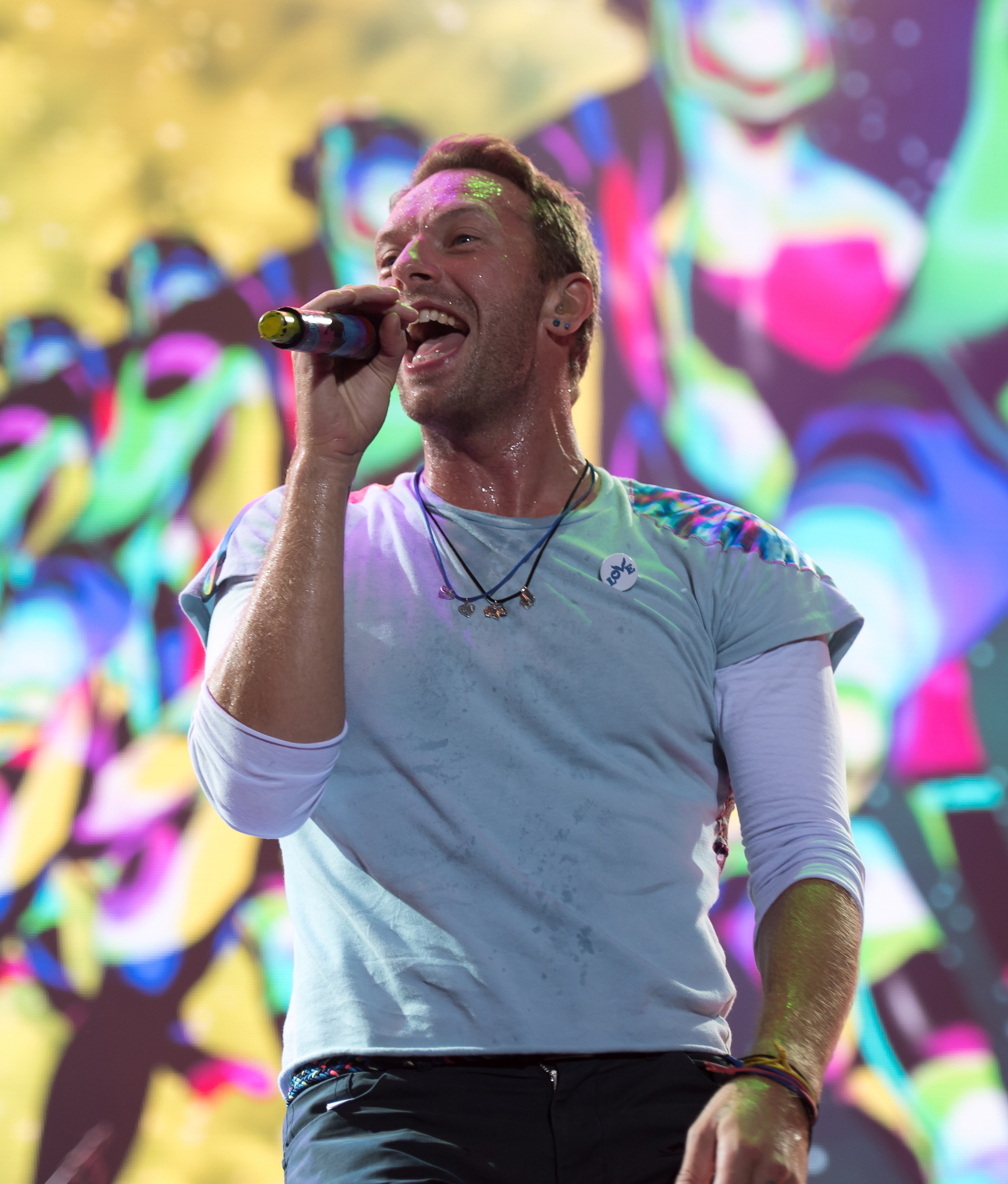
Coldplay frontman Chris Martin co-wrote "Homesick" with Lipa and contributes to the production by playing piano and singing additional vocals.

While in a planning meeting, Dua Lipa was asked by a woman named Caroline who she would love to work with. Lipa jokingly responded that she would love to work with Chris Martin. Caroline had worked with Coldplay for a number of years and asked Lipa to let her know if there is anything she could send to Martin, although he was really busy at the time. Lipa thought Caroline was just being polite, but decided to send Martin some unreleased tracks anyway. Caroline later sent Lipa an email that read that Martin really enjoyed her work and requested that she meet him at a studio in Malibu, California. When Lipa went to the studio and Martin was there with his engineer Bill Rahko. Lipa then played them everything she had, where Martin began dancing around the room, writing down song titles and being really attentive, listening to everything, and wanting to know every song's meaning. Lipa recalled Martin enjoying "New Rules" (2017) and found it really surreal in those moments. Martin also looked at Lipa's notes on her laptop where she had ideas for future albums.

Martin then suggested that they write a song for Lipa's debut album. Rahko and Martin set up microphones around the room, while Martin also began playing the piano. Lipa recalled that as soon as Martin began playing, she thought of Coldplay. They began recording the song, humming and making up melodies. It was getting quite late so Martin gave Lipa everything they had recorded and requested that she listen back to it and if there's something she liked, they'd come back to it. Lipa thought that Martin was sending her on her way and they were never going to see one and other again. Lipa did as Martin asked and picked out one of the melodies they had written. In one of Lipa's last trips to Los Angeles to finish her debut album, they arranged a second session at Woodshed Recording Studio in Malibu. Before writing, Lipa and Martin already came up with title, "Homesick". At first, Lipa was only supposed to sing but she begged Martin to sing along with her as she thought it sounded better. Rahko ended up handling the production and engineering with Alekes Von Korff serving as an assistant engineer. Lipa's vocals were later recorded at TaP Studio / Strongroom 7 in London. Mixing was handled by DJ Swivel, while mastering was done by John Davis at Metropolis Studios in London.

== Music and lyrics ==
"Homesick"
A piano ballad, "Homesick" is accompanied by a stripped back production where Lipa and Martin sing about being away from loved ones.

Musically, "Homesick" is a piano ballad that runs for three minutes and fifty seconds. Constructed in verse-chorus form, the song is composed in 4/4 time (save for a 5/4 interluding passage after the first chorus) and the key of F♯ major, with a slow ballad tempo of 66 beats per minute and a chord progression of D♯m–B–F♯–C♯sus–C♯. Lipa and Martin's vocals span from the low note of F♯_{3} to the high note of C♯_{5}. Its studio production is stripped away, leaving only the singers' vocals and a twinkling piano. Lipa was inspired by how much she travels and how she misses being in London. The song's opening line, "Here, where the sky's falling, I'm covered in blue," was inspired by how Lipa enjoys when it rains in Los Angeles because it feels like London. Lyrically, the song is about the sacrifice one makes, spending time away from loved ones to pursue their dream. It features religious imagery in the lyrics; she references guardian angels and alludes to Jesus walking on water from the Gospel of Matthew. Lipa described the song as the "most beautiful" song on her album.

== Release and promotion ==
Lipa first revealed the collaboration on 8 May 2017, during a performance in Singapore. The song was a last-minute addition to Lipa's eponymous debut studio album. "Homesick" was released on 2 June 2017 as the 12th and closing track on the album; it appears as the 15th track on the Austrian, German and Swiss version of the album. The song was later released for digital download and streaming on 1 December 2017, as the third promotional single from the album. It was promoted to top 40 and adult contemporary radio formats in Belgium and the Netherlands a week later.

"Homesick" was performed as the encore during Lipa's Self-Titled Tour (2017–18). She also performed the song with Martin in 2017 during Coldplay's A Head Full of Dreams Tour, where she served as the opening act. On 4 November 2017, Lipa performed the song on Later... with Jools Holland, alongside "Be the One" (2015) and "New Rules". On 8 December 2017 and 3 February 2018, she performed it alongside "New Rules" on Sounds Like Friday Night and Saturday Night Live, respectively. The latter performance was met with mixed reviews, however critics judged it to be a successful encore. On 20 May, Lipa performed the song at the 2018 Billboard Music Awards as part of the Xfinity Encore Performance. Lipa performed the song as a duet with Pablo Alborán at the LOS40 Music Awards 2018, on 2 November of that year.

== Reception ==
Neil Z. Yeung of AllMusic labelled the song as "delicate" and praised its revelation of Lipa's "vulnerability and softness." He went on to note its potential for being a "direct sequel" to "Everglow" (2016) by Coldplay. Anjali Raguraman of The Straits Times agreed that it is "delicate," and also compared it to the works of Coldplay. For musicOMH, Ben Hogwood praised it for being the "least manipulated" song on its parent album, while also noting its "welcome tenderness" and "genuine sense of yearning." Dylan Yadav of Immortal Reviews called it a "nice change" from the rest of Dua Lipa and "a beautiful end to the record." The Fader's Aimee Cliff categorised Lipa's vocals as "fiery" and labelled the song as a whole "a straight-up 'I miss you' ballad." For Rolling Stone, Jonah Weiner it as a "wounded ballad" and "a slow, spotlit showcase for her rich, smoky voice."

In Renowned for Sound, Rachael Scarsbrook labelled "Homesick" as a "raw," and "ready to tug at the heartstrings" track. DIY's Alim Kheraj wrote that the song feels "overthought" and "calculated." In a negative review from The Line of Best Fit, Claire Biddles stated it feels "tacked on and unnecessary," while also suggesting it is the result of "a record label employee needing to tick the 'piano ballad' box." For The 405, Sean Ward compared it to a grandfather/daughter Britain's Got Talent audition, writing "nobody wants it and very few understand it." As it was released as single in Belgium and the Netherlands, "Homesick" reached number 2, 14 and 12 respectively on the Dutch Top 40, Dutch Single Top 100 and Ultratop 50 in the Flanders region of Belgium. The song received a gold certification in Belgium. In July 2020, the song was certified silver in the United Kingdom by the British Phonographic Industry (BPI).

== Personnel ==
- Dua Lipa – vocals
- Chris Martin – additional vocals, piano
- Bill Rahko – production, engineering
- Alekes Von Korff – assistant engineering
- Jordan "DJ Swivel" Young – mixing
- John Davis – mastering

== Charts ==
=== Weekly charts ===
Chart performance for "Homesick"
Chart (2018)	Peak position
Belgium (Ultratop 50 Flanders)	12
Netherlands (Dutch Top 40)	2
Netherlands (Single Top 100)	14

=== Year-end charts ===
2018 year-end chart performance for "Homesick"
Chart (2018)	Position
Belgium (Ultratop Flanders)	47
Netherlands (Dutch Top 40)	16

== Certifications ==
Certifications and sales for "Homesick"
Region	Certification	Certified units/sales
Belgium (BRMA)	Gold	10,000^{‡}
Canada (Music Canada)	Gold	40,000^{‡}
New Zealand (RMNZ)	Gold	15,000^{‡}
Poland (ZPAV)	Gold	25,000^{‡}
United Kingdom (BPI)	Silver	200,000^{‡}
^{‡} Sales+streaming figures based on certification alone.

== Release history ==
Release dates and formats for "Homesick"
Region	Date	Format	Label	Ref.
Various	1 December 2017	Digital download; streaming	Warner Bros.	
Belgium	8 December 2017	Top 40 radio; adult contemporary radio	Warner Bros.	
Netherlands	8 December 2017	Top 40 radio; adult contemporary radio	Warner Bros.	
