= Mad About You (disambiguation) =

Mad About You is a 1990s American sitcom which had a limited revival in 2019.

Mad About You may also refer to:

== Music ==
- "Mad About You" (Belinda Carlisle song), 1986
- "Mad About You" (Hooverphonic song), 2000
- "Mad About You" (Sting song), 1991
- "Mad About You", a song by Slaughter from Stick It to Ya, 1990
- "Mad About You", a song by Toto from Mindfields, 1999

== Television and film ==
- Mad About You (Chinese TV series), a 2016 sitcom
- Mad About You (film), a 1990 film starring Claudia Christian
