= Thinking 'Bout You (Dua Lipa song) =

2017 song by Dua Lipa

Promotional single by Dua Lipa

from the album Dua Lipa
- Written: September 2014
- Released: 6 January 2017
- Recorded: 2015
- Studio: Modulator Music (Canada); Sarm Music Village (London)
- Genre: Acoustic R&B; retro-soul
- Length: 2:51
- Label: Dua Lipa Limited
- Songwriters: Dua Lipa; Adam Argyle
- Producer: Stephen "Koz" Kozmeniuk

Music video
- "Thinking 'Bout You" on YouTube

"Thinking 'Bout You" is a song by English singer Dua Lipa from her eponymous debut studio album (2017). Lipa co-wrote the song with Adam Argyle, while production was handled by Stephen "Koz" Kozmeniuk. After premiering a demo of it in July 2015, the song was released for digital download and streaming on 6 January 2017, through Dua Lipa Limited as the second promotional single from Dua Lipa. It is a stripped-back acoustic R&B and retro-soul ballad driven by an acoustic guitar. The lyrics see Lipa attempting to forget about a past romance, confessing to using weed, alcohol and work as emotional stents.

Several music critics commended the song's showcase of Lipa's versatility as an artist as well as the lyrics. Commercially, "Thinking 'Bout You" charted on Ultratip charts in Belgium's Flanders and Wallonia regions, with respective peaks of number 6 and 36. It is certified Gold in Canada and Poland. In February 2017, the song received a music video directed by Jake Jelicich. It is a split screen visual that sees Lipa tossing and turning in a bed and playing with sheer curtains. She promoted the song with live performances for NPR, Jimmy Kimmel Live! and the Deutscher Radiopreis. A remix of the song by Decco was released for further promotion.

== Background and composition ==
"Thinking 'Bout You"
Driven by an acoustic guitar, "Thinking 'Bout You" features simple beats and finds Lipa attempting to forget about a past relationship.

"Thinking 'Bout You" was written by Dua Lipa and Adam Argyle. Stephen "Koz" Kozmeniuk produced six tracks on Lipa's debut album, including "Thinking 'Bout You". Koz played the drums, bass and synthesizer in the production, while Argyle played the guitar. Engineering was done by Cameron Gower Poole, assisted by Olly Thompson. The song was recorded at Modulator Music in Canada and the vocals were recorded at Sarm Music Village in London. Mixing and mastering were both handled by Matty Green at BabelFish Studios. (Note: The location of BabelFish Studios is not indicated in the liner notes of Dua Lipa.)

Musically, "Thinking 'Bout You" is an acoustic R&B and retro-soul ballad that runs for two minutes and 51 seconds. The song is composed in the time signature of 4/4 time and the key of E minor, with an acoustic groove tempo of 94 beats per minute and a chord progression of Cmaj7–Bm7–Am7–Bm7–E5. It follows a structure of verse, chorus, verse, chorus, middle eight, chorus. The song is driven by a plucked acoustic guitar and features a stripped-back production, with simple beats and an acoustic melody. Lipa uses impassioned, raspy and bluesy vocals that range from E_{3} to D_{5}. Lyrically, the song is a lovelorn lament that paints a picture of loss. Lipa attempts to forget about a past romance while evoking desperation in her tone, however, the memories keep haunting her. She admits that she used weed, alcohol and work as emotional stents.

== Release and promotion ==
Lipa uploaded a demo version of "Thinking 'Bout You" to her SoundCloud and YouTube accounts in July 2015. It was included in the set lists for Lipa's 2016 UK Tour and Hotter than Hell Tour. Lipa performed the song at YouTube Space in Los Angeles for the YouTube Music Foundry in April 2016. A live version of the song was released as the opening track on Lipa's Spotify Sessions extended play (EP) on 8 July 2016. Later that year, she performed the song on a balcony in New York City for NPR. Lipa announced the song's formal release on 5 January 2017 and that it would receive a music video. "Thinking 'Bout You" was released for digital download and streaming through the singer's independent record label Dua Lipa Limited the following day. It served as the second promotional single from Lipa's eponymous debut studio album, following the Lead promotional single "Room for 2" (2016). A remix by Decco was released on 20 January 2017.

Lipa gave a performance of the song on Jimmy Kimmel Live! in April 2017 alongside one of her singles "Be the One". "Thinking 'Bout You" appears as the ninth track on Dua Lipa, released on 2 June 2017. It was included on the setlist for the singer's Self-Titled Tour, which ran from 2017 to 2018. In 2018, she performed the song in a live session at Roundhead Studios in New Zealand for Warner Music New Zealand. Lipa performed the song at the Deutscher Radiopreis in September 2018. Another live version of the song was released on 11 April 2019 as the opening track of the singer's Deezer Sessions EP.

== Reception ==
Rachel Sonis of Idolator commended "Thinking 'Bout You" for showcasing Lipa's versatility, saying "whether it's dance bangers or poignant slow-burners – this girl can really do it all". She additionally noted that the song shows Lipa's "more soulful side" and named it "a sultry ballad". Rolling Stone's Sarah Grant thought that the song "reveals a deeper side to her songwriting" while comparing it to "Amy Winehouse spitting her Tanqueray" and viewing the opening line as "indelible". For The Line of Best Fit, Laurence Day viewed the song as a "soulful, acoustic-led ballad" that is "a world away from the pumped-up pop" Lipa previously released. In Coup De Main Magazine, Shahlin Graves thought the song is of a more "leisurely vibe" than the singer's previous work, while Erica Gonzales of Harper's Bazaar stated it "pulls at the heartstrings". In his review for Clash, Robin Murray praised the song for "displaying a tender side to her infectious pop vision".

The staff of DIY stated that "Thinking 'Bout You" sees Lipa turning "the lights down low to get a bit reflective" and named it her "most emotionally charged track yet"; they concluded by saying "you're guaranteed to be thinking about this ballad all day". In his review of Dua Lipa for the same magazine, Alim Kheraj thought the song is one of the album's darkest moments, but also among its clearest due to giving one "just enough" of Lipa at her core. Writing for The Guardian, Caroline Sullivan named it "a scraped-bare everygirl tale of disconsolately hitting the booze and drugs" that "has her accelerating to full throttle". Jamie Milton of NME opined that the song "starts as an acoustic slow burner, but soon reveals itself to be a sharp-witted firecracker". Nylon's Sydney Gore said "there's no denying that this slow-burner might influence you to smoke up—or, at the very least, light a candle to blow off some steam".

Sebas E. Alonso of Jenesaispop thought that "Thinking 'Bout You" attempts to be too much like Lauryn Hill and Winehouse. Writing for Stereogum, Chris DeVille compared the song to the works of Jhené Aiko, but thought that it would not be what gets Lipa on the pop charts. musicOMH's Ben Hogwood thought that the song "feels unfinished despite its sentiments". In April 2020, Christopher Rosa of Glamour ranked it as Lipa's ninth worst song, stating that it does not have any problems, it is just not as "emotive or memorable" as other tracks on Dua Lipa. Additionally, he named the song a "raspy acoustic slow jam". "Thinking 'Bout You" spent five weeks on the Belgium Ultratip Flanders chart, peaking at number six, while it spent six weeks on the Ultratip Wallonia chart, reaching number 36.

== Music video ==
The music video for "Thinking 'Bout You" was directed by Jake Jelicich and premiered on Lipa's YouTube channel on 22 February 2017. It is a split screen visual, nodding to Requiem for a Dream (2000), directed by Darren Aronofsky. One side of the screen shows the singer's full body while the other zooms in on different parts of her body, including her eyes, nails and tattoos. Lipa wears a loose hoodie, simple makeup and gold jewelry, and tosses and turns in a bed. She eventually gets up to hide behind and play with some sheer curtains.

== Track listings ==
- Digital download and streaming
1. "Thinking 'Bout You" – 2:51
- Digital download and streaming – Decco remix
1. "Thinking 'Bout You" (Decco remix) – 3:49

== Personnel ==
- Dua Lipa – vocals
- Stephen "Koz" Kozmeniuk – production, drums, bass, synthesizer
- Adam Argyle – guitar
- Cameron Gower Poole – engineering
- Olly Thompson – assistant engineering
- Matty Green – mixing, mastering

== Charts ==
Chart performance for "Thinking 'Bout You"
Chart (2017)	Peak position
Belgium (Ultratip Bubbling Under Flanders)	6
Belgium (Ultratip Bubbling Under Wallonia)	36

== Certifications ==
Certifications and sales for "Thinking 'Bout You"
Region	Certification	Certified units/sales
Canada (Music Canada)	Gold	40,000^{‡}
Poland (ZPAV)	Gold	25,000^{‡}
^{‡} Sales+streaming figures based on certification alone.

== Release history ==
Release dates and formats for "Thinking 'Bout You"
Region	Date	Format(s)	Version	Label	Ref.
Various	6 January 2017	Digital download; streaming	Original	Dua Lipa Limited	
Various	20 January 2017	Digital download; streaming	Decco remix	Dua Lipa Limited	
