= Thinking of You =

Thinking of You may refer to:

== Albums ==
- Thinking of You (Bogdan Raczynski album), 2000
- Thinking of You (Duke Jordan album), 1982
- Thinking of You (Houston Person album), 2010
- Thinking of You (Kitarō album), 1999

== Songs ==
- "Thinking of You" (1927 song), a popular song written by Harry Ruby and Bert Kalmar
- "Thinking of You" (Bonnie Pink song), 2001
- "Thinking of You" (Earth, Wind & Fire song), 1988
- "Thinking of You" (Hanson song), 1997
- "Thinking of You" (Katy Perry song), 2008
- "Thinking of You" (Loggins and Messina song), 1973
- "Thinking of You" (Sa-Fire song), 1989
- "Thinking of You" (Sister Sledge song), 1984
- "Thinking of You" (Status Quo song), 2004
- "Thinking of You (I Drive Myself Crazy)", a 1998 song by NSYNC
- "Thinking of You", a song by A Perfect Circle from Mer de Noms
- "Thinking of You", a song by A Tough of Class from Planet Pop
- "Thinking of You", a song by Dierks Bentley from Home
- "Thinking of You", a song by Fats Domino
- "Thinking of You", a song by Harlequin
- "Thinking of You", a song by Herman's Hermits from Herman's Hermits
- "Thinking of You", a song by Joe Satriani from Time Machine
- "Thinking of You", a song by Kesha from Warrior
- "Thinking of You", a song by Lenny Kravitz from 5
- "Thinking of You", a song by Mabel from High Expectations
- "Thinking of You", a song by Tesla Boy from Modern Thrills
- "Thinking of You", a song by The Colourfield from Virgins and Philistines
