= What I Like About You =

What I Like About You may refer to:

- What I Like About You (TV series), an American sitcom
- "What I Like About You" (The Romantics song), 1980
- "What I Like About You" (Jonas Blue song), 2019
- "What I Like About You", a 2004 song by Jon B. featuring Babyface, from the album Stronger Everyday

== See also ==
- That's What I Like About You (disambiguation)
