= How About You =

How About You may refer to:

- How About You (film), a 2007 Irish film
- "How About You?", a 1941 song composed by Burton Lane, with lyrics by Ralph Freed
- "How About You" (Staind song)
- "How About You", a song by Cheap Trick from Standing on the Edge, 1985
- "How 'Bout You", a song by Eric Church
