= Everything About You =

"Everything About You" may refer to:

- "Everything About You" (Ugly Kid Joe song)
- "Everything About You" (Sanctus Real song)
- "Everything About You", a song by One Direction from the album Up All Night

== See also ==
- "I Hate Everything About You", a song by Three Days Grace
