= All About You (TV series) =

- "All About You" titles.
- Written by: Ada Litchfield
- Starring: Host: Louise McNamara
- Country of origin: United States

Production
- Running time: 15 minutes
- Production companies: WHRO-TV (prior to 1974); WGBH-TV (1974)

Original release
- Network: syndicated
- Release: 1974 – 1974

All About You was an educational television series that was syndicated to numerous educational and PBS stations during the early and mid-1970s, mainly as part of weekday in-school telecasts.

The series was first produced at WHRO-TV, "Hampton Roads ETV", in Hampton, Virginia. In 1974, production of the series was moved to WGBH-TV Boston, where it was produced in association with WGBH's in-school television initiative, the "21-Inch Classroom". The 1974 episodes were distributed in the US and Canada by the Agency for Instructional Television; this is one of a few WGBH series to have not been distributed by NET or PBS. Some episodes would also use props, material and other resources from another WGBH program of the era, ZOOM; such shows have that program listed in the "Special Thanks" credits at the end of the show. Louise McNamara would also write a series of children's books. Episodes of the WGBH version are available to view online through the Moving Image Archive of Indiana University, which housed most of AIT's output since the organization's closure in 2015.

== Overview of series ==
All About You was a series of short, videotaped programs that generally ran for 15 minutes or less that were hosted by future children's author Louise McNamara and written by Ada Litchfield. The show was geared towards youngsters aged 6–8 as a way to educate them on their bodies, especially where they came from, why they have what they have, what makes them work and why they work. The show's opening and closing credits always featured slides of cartoon drawings of kids enjoying themselves at a circus with appropriate circus music.
