= Something About You =

Something About You may refer to:

== Albums ==
- Something About You (Angela Bofill album) or the title song, 1981
- Something About You (Joey Yung album), 2002

== Songs ==
- "Something About You" (Christian Burns song), 2008
- "Something About You" (Elderbrook and Rudimental song), 2019
- "Something About You" (Eyedress song), 2021
- "Something About You" (Four Tops song). 1965
- "Something About You" (Hayden James song), 2014
- "Something About You" (Jamelia song), 2006
- "Something About You" (Level 42 song), 1985
- "Something About You", by All-4-One from All-4-One, 1994
- "Something About You", by Boston from Boston, 1976
- "Something About You", by DramaGods from Love, 2005
- "Something About You", by Five for Fighting from America Town, 2000
- "Something About You", by Jamiroquai from Automaton, 2017
- "Something About You", by Kevin Lyttle from Fyah, 2008
- "Something About You", by Majid Jordan from Majid Jordan, 2016
- "Something About You", by New Edition from Home Again, 1996
- "Something About You", by Re-Flex from The Politics of Dancing, 1983
- "Something About You", by State Champs from Living Proof, 2018
- "Something About U", by Kim Petras from Problématique, 2023
- "Something About You", by Drake and PartyNextDoor from $ome $exy $ongs 4 U, 2025

== See also ==
- "Sum Bout U", a 2020 song by 645AR featuring FKA Twigs
