= List of awards and nominations received by Dua Lipa =

Dua Lipa awards and nominations
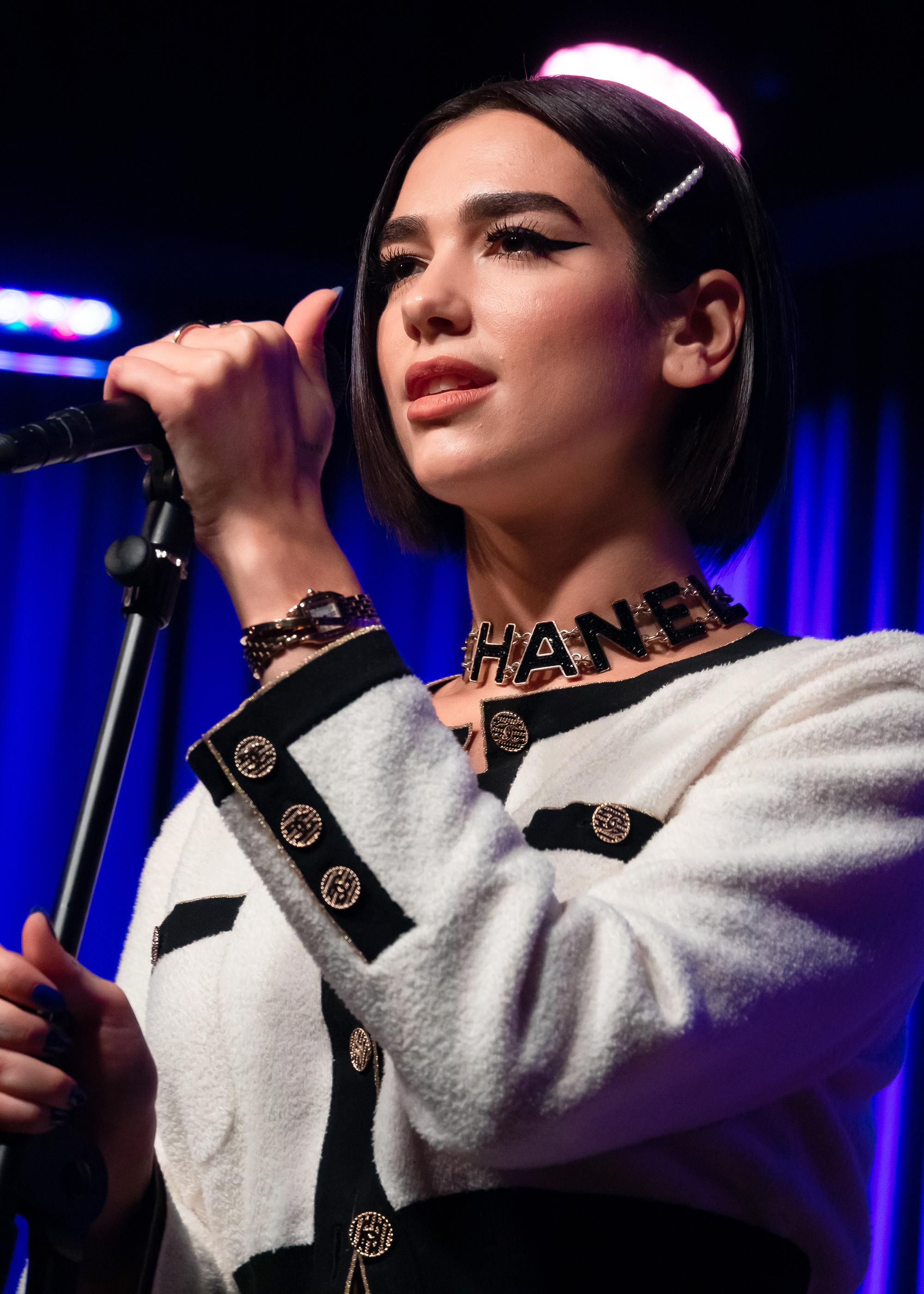
- Lipa at the Grammy Museum in 2018
Awards and nominations
| Award | Wins | Nominations |
| American Music Awards | 2 | 7 |
| APRA Music Awards | 1 | 3 |
| ARIA Music Awards | 0 | 1 |
| ASCAP Latin Awards | 1 | 1 |
| ASCAP Pop Music Awards | 6 | 6 |
| Asian Pop Music Awards | 0 | 1 |
| Atlantic Council Gala | 1 | 1 |
| Bambi Awards | 1 | 1 |
| BBC Music Awards | 0 | 1 |
| BBC Radio 1's Teen Awards | 2 | 5 |
| BBC Sound of... | 0 | 1 |
| The Beano Awards | 0 | 1 |
| Billboard Latin Music Awards | 0 | 1 |
| Billboard Music Awards | 4 | 19 |
| Billboard Women in Music | 1 | 1 |
| Bravo Otto | 0 | 1 |
| Brit Awards | 7 | 16 |
| British LGBT Awards | 0 | 3 |
| Camerimage | 0 | 2 |
| Clio Awards | 1 | 1 |
| Creative Circle Awards | 2 | 2 |
| D&AD Awards | 1 | 1 |
| daf BAMA Music Awards | 0 | 2 |
| Danish Music Awards | 0 | 1 |
| Echo Awards | 0 | 1 |
| Electronic Music Awards | 0 | 1 |
| Eurosonic Noorderslag | 3 | 3 |
| Footwear News Achievement Awards | 1 | 1 |
| GAFFA Awards (Denmark) | 0 | 1 |
| GAFFA Awards (Sweden) | 0 | 4 |
| Gaygalan Awards | 0 | 2 |
| Glamour Awards | 1 | 1 |
| Global Awards | 6 | 12 |
| Golden Globe Awards | 0 | 1 |
| GQ Men of the Year Awards | 1 | 1 |
| Grammy Awards | 3 | 10 |
| Guinness World Records | 2 | 2 |
| Hito Music Awards | 2 | 2 |
| Hit FM Music Awards | 1 | 1 |
| Hungarian Music Awards | 1 | 2 |
| iHeartRadio MMVAs | 0 | 1 |
| iHeartRadio Music Awards | 3 | 16 |
| iHeartRadio Titanium Award | 4 | 4 |
| International Dance Music Awards | 0 | 1 |
| Ivor Novello Awards | 0 | 1 |
| Joox Indonesia Music Awards | 0 | 1 |
| Joox Thailand Music Awards | 0 | 3 |
| KKBox Music Awards | 1 | 1 |
| Latin American Music Awards | 1 | 1 |
| Lo Nuestro Awards | 1 | 1 |
| LOS40 Music Awards | 7 | 15 |
| Mercury Prize | 0 | 1 |
| Meus Prêmios Nick | 0 | 1 |
| Mnet Asian Music Awards | 1 | 1 |
| MTV Europe Music Awards | 2 | 18 |
| MTV Millennial Awards | 0 | 6 |
| MTV Millennial Awards Brazil | 0 | 7 |
| MTV Video Music Awards | 2 | 20 |
| MTV Video Music Awards Japan | 1 | 1 |
| MTV Video Play Awards | 7 | 7 |
| Music Industry Awards | 1 | 1 |
| Music Week Awards | 1 | 3 |
| MVPA Awards | 0 | 2 |
| Nickelodeon Kids' Choice Awards | 1 | 2 |
| Nickelodeon Mexico Kids' Choice Awards | 0 | 2 |
| NME Awards | 1 | 7 |
| NR1 Video Music Awards | 1 | 1 |
| NRJ Music Awards | 4 | 10 |
| Official Charts Company | 4 | 4 |
| OGAE Contests | 2 | 2 |
| People's Choice Awards | 0 | 4 |
| Pollstar Awards | 1 | 2 |
| Popjustice £20 Music Prize | 1 | 5 |
| Premios Juventud | 1 | 2 |
| Premios MUSA | 1 | 6 |
| Premios Odeón | 1 | 2 |
| Radio Disney Music Awards | 1 | 2 |
| RTHK International Pop Poll Awards | 5 | 5 |
| Satellite Awards | 0 | 1 |
| SCTV Music Awards | 1 | 1 |
| Seoul Music Awards | 0 | 1 |
| Shorty Awards | 1 | 6 |
| Silver Clef Awards | 1 | 2 |
| South Bank Sky Arts Awards | 1 | 1 |
| TEC Awards | 0 | 1 |
| Teen Choice Awards | 0 | 5 |
| Telehit Awards | 2 | 3 |
| The O2 | 1 | 1 |
| Top 40 Awards | 2 | 2 |
| Top Hit Music Awards | 1 | 1 |
| UK Music Video Awards | 5 | 15 |
| Urban Music Awards | 0 | 6 |
| Variety Hitmakers Awards | 2 | 2 |
| Virgin Atlantic Attitude Awards | 1 | 1 |
| Vogue Women of the Year Awards | 1 | 1 |
| WDM Radio Awards | 2 | 2 |
| Webby Awards | 2 | 3 |
| Wish 107.5 Music Awards | 1 | 1 |
| YouTube Creator Awards | 3 | 3 |

Totals (Note: Certain award groups do not simply award one winner. They acknowledge several different recipients, have runners-up, and have third place. Since this is a specific recognition and is different from losing an award, runner-up mentions are considered wins in this award tally. For simplification and to avoid errors, each award in this list has been presumed to have had a prior nomination.)
- Wins: 137
- Nominations: 345

English singer Dua Lipa is the recipient of numerous awards. This includes nominations for sixteen Brit Awards, ten Grammy Awards and seven NME Awards, winning seven, three and one respectively. She became the first female artist to receive five nominations in a single year at the Brit Awards.

Lipa signed a record deal with Warner Music Group in 2015 and released her self-titled debut album in 2017, which earned her nominations for Album of the Year at the 2017 BBC Music Awards, British Album of the Year at the 2018 Brit Awards, and won International Album of the Year at the thirteenth edition of the LOS40 Music Awards.

The single "New Rules", from her self-titled album, earned nominations for British Single of the Year and Best British Video at the 2018 Brit Awards, Best Music Video at the 2018 iHeartRadio Music Awards and Song of the Year at the 2018 MTV Video Music Awards. The song won Direction for Music Videos at the 2018 D&AD Awards and Best Song To Lip Sync To at the 2018 Radio Disney Music Awards. "One Kiss", a collaboration with Scottish record producer Calvin Harris, and "IDGAF" were also nominated for British Single of the Year and Best British Video at the 2019 Brit Awards.

Lipa won Best New Artist and Best Dance Recording for "Electricity", a collaboration with British-American duo Silk City, at the 61st Annual Grammy Awards. She released her second studio album, Future Nostalgia, in 2020. It won Best Pop Vocal Album at the 63rd Annual Grammy Awards, and earned a nomination for Album of the Year. The album's lead single, "Don't Start Now" (2019), received nominations for Record of the Year, Song of the Year and Best Pop Solo Performance at the same ceremony.

== Awards and nominations ==
| Award | Year (Note: Indicates the year of ceremony. Each year is linked to the article about the awards held that year, wherever possible.) | Recipient(s) and nominee(s) | Category | Result | Ref. |
|---|---|---|---|---|---|
| American Music Awards | 2018 | Herself | New Artist of the Year | Nominated | |
| American Music Awards | 2020 | Herself | Favorite Pop Female Artist | Nominated | |
| American Music Awards | 2020 | "Don't Start Now" | Favorite Pop Song | Won | |
| American Music Awards | 2021 | Herself | Favorite Pop Female Artist | Nominated | |
| American Music Awards | 2021 | "Levitating" | Favorite Pop Song | Nominated | |
| American Music Awards | 2021 | Future Nostalgia | Favorite Pop Album | Nominated | |
| American Music Awards | 2022 | "Cold Heart (Pnau Remix)" (with Elton John) | Collaboration of the Year | Won | |
| APRA Music Awards | 2021 | "Break My Heart" | Most Performed Australian Work | Nominated | |
| APRA Music Awards | 2021 | "Break My Heart" | Most Performed Pop Work | Nominated | |
| APRA Music Awards | 2021 | "Don't Start Now" | Most Performed International Work | Won | |
| ARIA Music Awards | 2020 | Future Nostalgia & Dua Lipa | Best International Artist | Nominated | |
| The Arthur Awards | 2026 | Radical Optimism Tour | The Top Tour Award | Nominated | |
| Asian Pop Music Awards | 2025 | "Handlebars" (with Jennie) | Best Collaboration | Nominated | |
| ASCAP Latin Awards | 2021 | "Un Día (One Day)" (with J Balvin, Bad Bunny & Tainy) | Winning Songwriters | Won | |
| ASCAP Pop Music Awards | 2017 | Herself | Vanguard Award | Won | |
| ASCAP Pop Music Awards | 2021 | "Break My Heart" | Winning Songwriters | Won | |
| ASCAP Pop Music Awards | 2021 | "Don't Start Now" | Winning Songwriters | Won | |
| ASCAP Pop Music Awards | 2022 | "Levitating" | Song of the Year | Won | |
| ASCAP Pop Music Awards | 2025 | "Houdini" | Winning Songwriters | Won | |
| ASCAP Pop Music Awards | 2025 | "Illusion" | Winning Songwriters | Won | |
| Atlantic Council Gala | 2021 | Herself | Distinguished Artistic Leadership Award | Won | |
| Bambi Awards | 2018 | Herself | International Music Honor | Won | |
| BBC Music Awards | 2017 | Dua Lipa | Album of the Year | Nominated | |
| BBC Radio 1's Teen Awards | 2017 | Herself | Best British Solo Artist | Nominated | |
| BBC Radio 1's Teen Awards | 2017 | "New Rules" | Best Single | Won | |
| BBC Radio 1's Teen Awards | 2018 | Herself | Best British Solo Artist | Won | |
| BBC Radio 1's Teen Awards | 2018 | Herself | Best Social Media Star | Nominated | |
| BBC Radio 1's Teen Awards | 2018 | "One Kiss" (with Calvin Harris) | Best Single | Nominated | |
| BBC Sound of... | 2016 | Herself | Sound of 2016 | Nominated | |
| The Beano Awards | 2017 | "New Rules" | Pop Song of the Year | Nominated | |
| Billboard Latin Music Awards | 2021 | Herself | Crossover Artist of the Year | Nominated | |
| Billboard Music Awards | 2019 | Herself | Billboard Chart Achievement Award | Nominated | |
| Billboard Music Awards | 2019 | Herself | Top New Artist | Nominated | |
| Billboard Music Awards | 2019 | "One Kiss" (with Calvin Harris) | Top Dance/Electronic Song | Nominated | |
| Billboard Music Awards | 2021 | Herself | Top Female Artist | Nominated | |
| Billboard Music Awards | 2021 | Herself | Top Hot 100 Artist | Nominated | |
| Billboard Music Awards | 2021 | Herself | Top Radio Songs Artist | Nominated | |
| Billboard Music Awards | 2021 | "Don't Start Now" | Top Radio Song | Nominated | |
| Billboard Music Awards | 2022 | Herself | Top Female Artist | Nominated | |
| Billboard Music Awards | 2022 | Herself | Top Song Sales Artist | Nominated | |
| Billboard Music Awards | 2022 | Herself | Top Billboard Global (Excl. U.S.) Artist | Nominated | |
| Billboard Music Awards | 2022 | "Levitating" | Top Hot 100 Song | Nominated | |
| Billboard Music Awards | 2022 | "Levitating" | Top Streaming Song | Nominated | |
| Billboard Music Awards | 2022 | "Levitating" | Top Selling Song | Nominated | |
| Billboard Music Awards | 2022 | "Levitating" | Top Radio Song | Won | |
| Billboard Music Awards | 2022 | "Levitating" | Top Billboard Global 200 Song | Nominated | |
| Billboard Music Awards | 2022 | "Cold Heart (Pnau remix)" (with Elton John) | Top Dance/Electronic Song | Won | |
| Billboard Music Awards | 2024 | Herself | Top Dance/Electronic Artist | Nominated | |
| Billboard Music Awards | 2024 | "Houdini" | Top Dance/Electronic Song | Won | |
| Billboard Music Awards | 2024 | "Illusion" | Top Dance/Electronic Song | Nominated | |
| Billboard Women in Music | 2020 | Herself | Powerhouse Award | Won | |
| Bravo Otto | 2020 | Herself | Best International Artist | Nominated | |
| Brit Awards | 2017 | Herself | Critics' Choice | Nominated | |
| Brit Awards | 2018 | Herself | British Breakthrough Act | Won | |
| Brit Awards | 2018 | Herself | British Female Solo Artist | Won | |
| Brit Awards | 2018 | Dua Lipa | British Album of the Year | Nominated | |
| Brit Awards | 2018 | "New Rules" | British Single of the Year | Nominated | |
| Brit Awards | 2018 | "New Rules" | British Video of the Year | Nominated | |
| Brit Awards | 2019 | "One Kiss" (with Calvin Harris) | British Single of the Year | Won | |
| Brit Awards | 2019 | "IDGAF" | British Single of the Year | Nominated | |
| Brit Awards | 2019 | "One Kiss" (with Calvin Harris) | British Video of the Year | Nominated | |
| Brit Awards | 2019 | "IDGAF" | British Video of the Year | Nominated | |
| Brit Awards | 2021 | Herself | British Female Solo Artist | Won | |
| Brit Awards | 2021 | Future Nostalgia | British Album of the Year | Won | |
| Brit Awards | 2021 | "Physical" | British Single of the Year | Nominated | |
| Brit Awards | 2022 | "Cold Heart (Pnau remix)" (with Elton John) | Song of the Year | Nominated | |
| Brit Awards | 2022 | Herself | Best Pop/R&B Act | Won | |
| Brit Awards | 2023 | Herself | Best Pop/R&B Act | Nominated | |
| Brit Awards | 2024 | "Dance the Night" | Song of the Year | Nominated | |
| Brit Awards | 2024 | Herself | British Artist of the Year | Nominated | |
| Brit Awards | 2024 | Herself | Best Pop Act | Won | |
| Brit Awards | 2025 | Radical Optimism | British Album of the Year | Nominated | |
| Brit Awards | 2025 | "Training Season" | Song of the Year | Nominated | |
| Brit Awards | 2025 | Herself | British Artist of the Year | Nominated | |
| Brit Awards | 2025 | Herself | Best Pop Act | Nominated | |
| British LGBT Awards | 2018 | Herself | Music Artist | Nominated | |
| British LGBT Awards | 2019 | Herself | Celebrity Ally | Nominated | |
| British LGBT Awards | 2020 | Herself | Celebrity Ally | Nominated | |
| Camerimage | 2020 | "Physical" | Best Music Video | Nominated | |
| Camerimage | 2020 | "Physical" | Best Cinematography in a Music Video | Nominated | |
| Capri Hollywood International Film Festival | 2023 | "Dance the Night" | Best Original Song | Won | |
| Clio Awards | 2022 | "Levitating" | Best Video Animation in Music Marketing | Bronze | |
| Creative Circle Awards | 2020 | "Physical" | Best Achievement in Music Video Production | Silver | |
| Creative Circle Awards | 2020 | "Physical" | Best Music Promo Film | Silver | |
| D&AD Awards | 2018 | "New Rules" | Direction for Music Videos | Won | |
| daf BAMA Music Awards | 2017 | "New Rules" | Best Video | Nominated | |
| daf BAMA Music Awards | 2018 | "One Kiss" (with Calvin Harris) | Best Song | Nominated | |
| Danish Music Awards | 2020 | "Don't Start Now" | International Hit of the Year | Nominated | |
| Echo Awards | 2018 | Herself | Best International Rock/Pop Female Artist | Nominated | |
| Electronic Music Awards | 2017 | "Scared to Be Lonely" (with Martin Garrix) | Single of the Year | Nominated | |
| Eurosonic Noorderslag | 2017 | Herself | European Border Breakers Award: United Kingdom | Won | |
| Eurosonic Noorderslag | 2017 | Herself | Public Choice Award | Won | |
| Eurosonic Noorderslag | 2023 | Herself | ESNS Excellence Award | Won | |
| Footwear News Achievement Awards | 2022 | Puma x Dua Lipa Flutur Drop 2 | Collection of the Year | Won | |
| GAFFA Awards (Denmark) | 2018 | Herself | Best Foreign New Act | Nominated | |
| GAFFA Awards (Denmark) | 2021 | Herself | International Solo Artist of the Year | Nominated | |
| GAFFA Awards (Denmark) | 2021 | Future Nostalgia | International Album of the Year | Nominated | |
| GAFFA Awards (Sweden) | 2019 | "One Kiss" (with Calvin Harris) | Best Foreign Song | Nominated | |
| GAFFA Awards (Sweden) | 2021 | Future Nostalgia | International Album of the Year | Nominated | |
| GAFFA Awards (Sweden) | 2021 | Herself | International Solo Artist of the Year | Nominated | |
| GAFFA Awards (Sweden) | 2021 | "Don't Start Now" | International Song of the Year | Nominated | |
| Gaygalan Awards | 2018 | "New Rules" | International Song of the Year | Nominated | |
| Gaygalan Awards | 2022 | "Cold Heart (Pnau remix)" (with Elton John) | International Song of the Year | Nominated | |
| Glamour Awards | 2017 | Herself | Next Breakthrough | Won | |
| Global Awards | 2018 | Herself | Best Female | Nominated | |
| Global Awards | 2018 | Herself | Rising Star Award | Nominated | |
| Global Awards | 2018 | Herself | Best Pop | Nominated | |
| Global Awards | 2019 | Herself | Best Female | Won | |
| Global Awards | 2019 | Herself | Best British Artist or Group | Won | |
| Global Awards | 2019 | Herself | Best Pop | Nominated | |
| Global Awards | 2020 | Herself | Best Female | Nominated | |
| Global Awards | 2020 | Herself | Best British Act | Won | |
| Global Awards | 2020 | Herself | Best Pop | Nominated | |
| Global Awards | 2021 | Herself | Best Female | Won | |
| Global Awards | 2021 | Herself | Best British Act | Won | |
| Global Awards | 2021 | "Don't Start Now" | Most Played Song of the Year | Won | |
| Golden Globe Awards | 2024 | "Dance the Night" | Best Original Song | Nominated | |
| GQ Men of the Year Awards | 2018 | Herself | Solo Artist of the Year | Won | |
| Grammy Awards | 2019 | Herself | Best New Artist | Won | |
| Grammy Awards | 2019 | "Electricity" (with Silk City) | Best Dance Recording | Won | |
| Grammy Awards | 2021 | "Don't Start Now" | Record of the Year | Nominated | |
| Grammy Awards | 2021 | "Don't Start Now" | Song of the Year | Nominated | |
| Grammy Awards | 2021 | "Don't Start Now" | Best Pop Solo Performance | Nominated | |
| Grammy Awards | 2021 | Future Nostalgia | Album of the Year | Nominated | |
| Grammy Awards | 2021 | Future Nostalgia | Best Pop Vocal Album | Won | |
| Grammy Awards | 2021 | "Un Día (One Day)" (with J Balvin, Bad Bunny & Tainy) | Best Pop Duo/Group Performance | Nominated | |
| Grammy Awards | 2024 | "Dance the Night" | Song of the Year | Nominated | |
| Grammy Awards | 2024 | "Dance the Night" | Best Song Written for Visual Media | Nominated | |
| Guinness World Records | 2020 | Herself | Most tickets sold for a livestreamed concert by a solo female artist | Won | |
| Guinness World Records | 2021 | Herself | Most monthly listeners on Spotify for a female | Won | |
| Hito Music Awards | 2021 | "Break My Heart" | Western Songs of the Year | Won | |
| Hito Music Awards | 2025 | "Houdini" | Western Songs of the Year | Won | |
| Hit FM Music Awards | 2022 | "Love Again" | Top 10 Singles | Won | |
| Hungarian Music Awards | 2018 | Dua Lipa | Foreign Pop/Rock Album or Soundtrack of the Year | Nominated | |
| Hungarian Music Awards | 2021 | Future Nostalgia | Foreign Pop/Rock Album or Soundtrack of the Year | Won | |
| Hungarian Music Awards | 2026 | Dua Lipa Live from the Royal Albert Hall and Radical Optimism | Foreign Modern Pop/Rock Album or Recording of the Year | Nominated | |
| iHeartRadio MMVAs | 2018 | Herself | Fan Fave New Artist | Nominated | |
| iHeartRadio Music Awards | 2018 | "New Rules" | Best Music Video | Nominated | |
| iHeartRadio Music Awards | 2019 | Herself | Female Artist of the Year | Nominated | |
| iHeartRadio Music Awards | 2019 | "One Kiss" (with Calvin Harris) | Dance Song of the Year | Nominated | |
| iHeartRadio Music Awards | 2019 | "One Kiss" (with Calvin Harris) | Best Music Video | Nominated | |
| iHeartRadio Music Awards | 2021 | Herself | Female Artist of the Year | Won | |
| iHeartRadio Music Awards | 2021 | "Don't Start Now" | Song of the Year | Nominated | |
| iHeartRadio Music Awards | 2021 | "Don't Start Now" | Best Music Video | Nominated | |
| iHeartRadio Music Awards | 2021 | "Don't Start Now" | Best Lyrics | Nominated | |
| iHeartRadio Music Awards | 2022 | Herself | Female Artist of the Year | Nominated | |
| iHeartRadio Music Awards | 2022 | "Levitating" | Song of the Year | Won | |
| iHeartRadio Music Awards | 2022 | Future Nostalgia | Dance Album of the Year | Won | |
| iHeartRadio Music Awards | 2023 | Herself | Artist of the Year | Nominated | |
| iHeartRadio Music Awards | 2023 | Herself | Favorite Tour Style | Nominated | |
| iHeartRadio Music Awards | 2023 | "Sweetest Pie" (with Megan Thee Stallion) | Best Collaboration | Nominated | |
| iHeartRadio Music Awards | 2023 | "Cold Heart (Pnau remix)" (with Elton John) | Best Collaboration | Nominated | |
| iHeartRadio Music Awards | 2023 | "Cold Heart (Pnau remix)" (with Elton John) | Dance Song of the Year | Nominated | |
| iHeartRadio Music Awards | 2024 | "Dance the Night" | Song of the Year | Nominated | |
| iHeartRadio Music Awards | 2024 | "Dance the Night" | Best Music Video | Nominated | |
| iHeartRadio Music Awards | 2024 | "Houdini" | Best Lyrics | Nominated | |
| iHeartRadio Music Awards | 2025 | "Houdini" | Best Music Video | Nominated | |
| iHeartRadio Music Awards | 2025 | Herself | Dance Artist of the Year | Nominated | |
| iHeartRadio Music Awards | 2026 | Radical Optimism Tour | Favorite Tour Style | Nominated | |
| iHeartRadio Music Awards | 2026 | Surprise guest | Favorite Tour Tradition | Nominated | |
| iHeartRadio Titanium Award | 2019 | "New Rules" | 1 Billion Total Audience Spins on iHeartRadio Stations | Won | |
| iHeartRadio Titanium Award | 2020 | "Don't Start Now" | 1 Billion Total Audience Spins on iHeartRadio Stations | Won | |
| iHeartRadio Titanium Award | 2020 | "Break My Heart" | 1 Billion Total Audience Spins on iHeartRadio Stations | Won | |
| iHeartRadio Titanium Award | 2021 | "Levitating" | 1 Billion Total Audience Spins on iHeartRadio Stations | Won | |
| International Dance Music Awards | 2019 | "Electricity" (with Silk City) | Best Pop/Electronic Song | Nominated | |
| Ivor Novello Awards | 2022 | "Cold Heart (Pnau remix)" (with Elton John) | PRS For Music Most Performed Work | Nominated | |
| Ivor Novello Awards | 2025 | "Houdini" | Most Performed Work | Nominated | |
| Joox Indonesia Music Awards | 2021 | "Levitating" (featuring DaBaby) | Global Song of the Year | Nominated | |
| Joox Thailand Music Awards | 2018 | Herself | International Artist of the Year | Nominated | |
| Joox Thailand Music Awards | 2019 | Herself | International Artist of the Year | Nominated | |
| Joox Thailand Music Awards | 2020 | Herself | International Artist of the Year | Nominated | |
| KKBox Music Awards | 2025 | Herself | Top 100 Artists | Won | |
| Latin American Music Awards | 2021 | Herself | Favorite Crossover Artist | Won | |
| Lo Nuestro Awards | 2021 | "Un Día (One Day)" (with J Balvin, Bad Bunny & Tainy) | Crossover Collaboration of the Year | Won | |
| LOS40 Music Awards | 2018 | Dua Lipa | International Album of the Year | Won | |
| LOS40 Music Awards | 2018 | "One Kiss" (with Calvin Harris) | International Song of the Year | Nominated | |
| LOS40 Music Awards | 2018 | "New Rules" | International Video of the Year | Nominated | |
| LOS40 Music Awards | 2018 | "New Rules" | International Song of the Year | Won | |
| LOS40 Music Awards | 2018 | Herself | International Artist/Group of the Year | Won | |
| LOS40 Music Awards | 2020 | Herself | International Artist/Group of the Year | Won | |
| LOS40 Music Awards | 2020 | Future Nostalgia | Best International Album | Won | |
| LOS40 Music Awards | 2020 | "Don't Start Now" | Best International Song | Nominated | |
| LOS40 Music Awards | 2020 | "Physical" | Best International Music Video | Nominated | |
| LOS40 Music Awards | 2021 | "We're Good" | Best International Music Video | Nominated | |
| LOS40 Music Awards | 2021 | Herself | Best International Live Act | Nominated | |
| LOS40 Music Awards | 2022 | Herself | Best International Live Act | Won | |
| LOS40 Music Awards | 2022 | "Cold Heart" (With Elton John) | Best International Collaboration | Nominated | |
| LOS40 Music Awards | 2023 | "Dance the Night" | Best International Song | Won | |
| LOS40 Music Awards | 2023 | Herself | Best International Act | Nominated | |
| Mercury Prize | 2020 | Future Nostalgia | Album of the Year | Nominated | |
| Meus Prêmios Nick | 2020 | "Break My Heart" | Favorite International Hit | Nominated | |
| Mnet Asian Music Awards | 2019 | Herself | International Favorite Artist | Won | |
| MTV Europe Music Awards | 2016 | Herself | Best Push Act | Nominated | |
| MTV Europe Music Awards | 2017 | Herself | Best UK & Ireland Act | Nominated | |
| MTV Europe Music Awards | 2017 | Herself | Best New Act | Won | |
| MTV Europe Music Awards | 2017 | Herself | Best Look | Nominated | |
| MTV Europe Music Awards | 2018 | Herself | Best Artist | Nominated | |
| MTV Europe Music Awards | 2018 | Herself | Best Pop | Won | |
| MTV Europe Music Awards | 2018 | Herself | Best Look | Nominated | |
| MTV Europe Music Awards | 2018 | Herself | Best UK & Ireland Act | Nominated | |
| MTV Europe Music Awards | 2020 | Herself | Best UK & Ireland Act | Nominated | |
| MTV Europe Music Awards | 2020 | Herself | Best Artist | Nominated | |
| MTV Europe Music Awards | 2020 | Herself | Best Pop | Nominated | |
| MTV Europe Music Awards | 2020 | "Don't Start Now" | Best Song | Nominated | |
| MTV Europe Music Awards | 2021 | Herself | Best Pop | Nominated | |
| MTV Europe Music Awards | 2021 | Herself | Best UK & Ireland Act | Nominated | |
| MTV Europe Music Awards | 2022 | "Sweetest Pie" (with Megan Thee Stallion) | Best Collaboration | Nominated | |
| MTV Europe Music Awards | 2023 | Herself | Best Pop | Nominated | |
| MTV Europe Music Awards | 2024 | Herself | Best Pop | Nominated | |
| MTV Europe Music Awards | 2024 | Herself | Best UK & Ireland Act | Nominated | |
| MTV Millennial Awards | 2018 | Herself | Global Instagrammer | Nominated | |
| MTV Millennial Awards | 2018 | "New Rules" | Global Hit of the Year | Nominated | |
| MTV Millennial Awards | 2019 | "Electricity" (with Silk City) | Global Hit of the Year | Nominated | |
| MTV Millennial Awards | 2021 | "Levitating" (featuring DaBaby) | Global Hit of the Year | Nominated | |
| MTV Millennial Awards | 2022 | "Cold Heart (Pnau remix)" (with Elton John) | Global Hit of the Year | Nominated | |
| MTV Millennial Awards | 2022 | Herself | Fandom | Nominated | |
| MTV Millennial Awards Brazil | 2018 | "New Rules" | Global Hit | Nominated | |
| MTV Millennial Awards Brazil | 2020 | "Don't Start Now" | Best Challenge | Nominated | |
| MTV Millennial Awards Brazil | 2020 | Herself | Fandom of the Year | Nominated | |
| MTV Millennial Awards Brazil | 2020 | "Break My Heart" | Global Hit | Nominated | |
| MTV Millennial Awards Brazil | 2021 | "Levitating" | Global Hit | Nominated | |
| MTV Millennial Awards Brazil | 2021 | "Prisoner" (with Miley Cyrus) | International Collaboration | Nominated | |
| MTV Millennial Awards Brazil | 2022 | "Cold Heart (Pnau remix)" (with Elton John) | Global Hit | Nominated | |
| MTV Video Music Awards | 2018 | "New Rules" | Song of the Year | Nominated | |
| MTV Video Music Awards | 2018 | "IDGAF" | Best Choreography | Nominated | |
| MTV Video Music Awards | 2018 | "One Kiss" (with Calvin Harris) | Song of Summer | Nominated | |
| MTV Video Music Awards | 2018 | "One Kiss" (with Calvin Harris) | Best Dance | Nominated | |
| MTV Video Music Awards | 2019 | "Electricity" (with Silk City) | Best Dance | Nominated | |
| MTV Video Music Awards | 2020 | "Don't Start Now" | Best Direction | Nominated | |
| MTV Video Music Awards | 2020 | "Physical" | Best Art Direction | Nominated | |
| MTV Video Music Awards | 2020 | "Physical" | Best Visual Effects | Won | |
| MTV Video Music Awards | 2020 | "Physical" | Best Choreography | Nominated | |
| MTV Video Music Awards | 2020 | "Break My Heart" | Song of Summer | Nominated | |
| MTV Video Music Awards | 2021 | "Levitating" | Song of Summer | Nominated | |
| MTV Video Music Awards | 2021 | "Levitating" | Song of the Year | Nominated | |
| MTV Video Music Awards | 2021 | "Prisoner" (with Miley Cyrus) | Best Collaboration | Nominated | |
| MTV Video Music Awards | 2021 | "Prisoner" (with Miley Cyrus) | Best Editing | Nominated | |
| MTV Video Music Awards | 2021 | "Un Día (One Day)" (with J Balvin, Bad Bunny & Tainy) | Best Latin | Nominated | |
| MTV Video Music Awards | 2022 | "Cold Heart (Pnau remix)" (with Elton John) | Song of the Year | Nominated | |
| MTV Video Music Awards | 2022 | "Cold Heart (Pnau remix)" (with Elton John) | Best Collaboration | Nominated | |
| MTV Video Music Awards | 2022 | "Sweetest Pie" (with Megan Thee Stallion) | Best Collaboration | Nominated | |
| MTV Video Music Awards | 2022 | "Sweetest Pie" (with Megan Thee Stallion) | Best Art Direction | Nominated | |
| MTV Video Music Awards | 2022 | "Sweetest Pie" (with Megan Thee Stallion) | Best Visual Effects | Nominated | |
| MTV Video Music Awards | 2023 | "Dance the Night" | Best Pop | Nominated | |
| MTV Video Music Awards | 2023 | "Dance the Night" | Best Choreography | Nominated | |
| MTV Video Music Awards | 2023 | "Dance the Night" | Song of the Summer | Nominated | |
| MTV Video Music Awards | 2024 | Herself | Best Pop | Nominated | |
| MTV Video Music Awards | 2024 | "Houdini" | Best Choreography | Won | |
| MTV Video Music Awards | 2024 | "Illusion" | Best Cinematography | Nominated | |
| MTV Video Music Awards Japan | 2020 | "Break My Heart" | Best International Female Video | Won | |
| MTV Video Play Awards | 2017 | "New Rules" | Winning Videos | Won | |
| MTV Video Play Awards | 2017 | "Scared to Be Lonely" (with Martin Garrix) | Winning Videos | Won | |
| MTV Video Play Awards | 2018 | "One Kiss" (with Calvin Harris) | Winning Videos | Won | |
| MTV Video Play Awards | 2018 | "IDGAF" | Winning Videos | Won | |
| MTV Video Play Awards | 2020 | "Don't Start Now" | Winning Videos | Won | |
| MTV Video Play Awards | 2020 | "Break My Heart" | Winning Videos | Won | |
| MTV Video Play Awards | 2021 | "We're Good" | Winning Videos | Won | |
| mtvU Woodie Awards | 2017 | Herself | Woodie to Watch | Nominated | |
| Music Industry Awards | 2022 | "Fever" (with Angèle) | Song of the Year | Won | |
| Music Week Awards | 2018 | Herself & Foot Locker | Music & Brand Partnership | Nominated | |
| Music Week Awards | 2021 | Herself - Tap Music Livestreams | Live Music Innovation of the Year | Won | |
| Music Week Awards | 2022 | Herself x Evian "Drink True" | Music & Brand Partnership | Nominated | |
| MVPA Awards | 2020 | "Physical" | Best International Video | Nominated | |
| MVPA Awards | 2020 | "Break My Heart" | Best International Video | Nominated | |
| Nickelodeon Kids' Choice Awards | 2020 | Herself | Favorite Global Music Star | Nominated | |
| Nickelodeon Kids' Choice Awards | 2023 | "Sweetest Pie" (with Megan Thee Stallion) | Favorite Music Collaboration | Won | |
| Nickelodeon Mexico Kids' Choice Awards | 2020 | "Don't Start Now" | Global Hit | Nominated | |
| NME Awards | 2017 | Herself | Best British Female Artist | Nominated | |
| NME Awards | 2017 | Herself | Best New Artist | Won | |
| NME Awards | 2018 | Herself | Best British Solo Artist | Nominated | |
| NME Awards | 2018 | "New Rules" | Best Track | Nominated | |
| NME Awards | 2018 | "New Rules" | Best Video | Nominated | |
| NME Awards | 2020 | "Don't Start Now" | Best British Song | Nominated | |
| NME Awards | 2020 | "Don't Start Now" | Best Song in the World | Nominated | |
| NR1 Video Music Awards | 2022 | Herself | Best Foreign Singer | Won | |
| NRJ Music Awards | 2018 | Herself | International Revelation of the Year | Nominated | |
| NRJ Music Awards | 2018 | Herself | International Female Artist of the Year | Nominated | |
| NRJ Music Awards | 2018 | Herself & Calvin Harris | International Duo/Group of the Year | Nominated | |
| NRJ Music Awards | 2018 | "One Kiss" (with Calvin Harris) | International Song of the Year | Nominated | |
| NRJ Music Awards | 2018 | "One Kiss" (with Calvin Harris) | Most Streamed Song | Won | |
| NRJ Music Awards | 2020 | Herself | International Female Artist of the Year | Won | |
| NRJ Music Awards | 2020 | "Physical" | International Song of the Year | Nominated | |
| NRJ Music Awards | 2020 | "Physical" | Video of the Year | Nominated | |
| NRJ Music Awards | 2021 | Herself | International Female Artist of the Year | Won | |
| NRJ Music Awards | 2021 | "Cold Heart (Pnau remix)" (with Elton John) | International Collaboration of the Year | Nominated | |
| Official Charts Company | 2017 | "New Rules" | Official Number 1 single award | Won | |
| Official Charts Company | 2018 | "One Kiss" (with Calvin Harris) | Official Number 1 single award | Won | |
| Official Charts Company | 2020 | Future Nostalgia | Official Number 1 album award | Won | |
| Official Charts Company | 2021 | "Cold Heart (Pnau remix)" (with Elton John) | Official Number 1 single award | Won | |
| OGAE Contests | 2020 | "Physical" | Song Contest | Won | |
| OGAE Contests | 2021 | "Fever" (with Angèle) | Video Contest | 7th place | |
| People's Choice Awards | 2020 | Future Nostalgia | Album of the Year | Nominated | |
| People's Choice Awards | 2020 | "Break My Heart" | Song of the Year | Nominated | |
| People's Choice Awards | 2020 | "Un Día (One Day)" (with J Balvin, Bad Bunny & Tainy) | Music Video of the Year | Nominated | |
| People's Choice Awards | 2020 | Herself | Female Artist of the Year | Nominated | |
| Pollstar Awards | 2023 | Future Nostalgia Tour | Pop Tour of the Year | Nominated | |
| Pollstar Awards | 2023 | Herself | New Headliner of the Year | Won | |
| Popjustice £20 Music Prize | 2016 | "Hotter than Hell" | Best British Pop Single | Nominated | |
| Popjustice £20 Music Prize | 2018 | "One Kiss" (with Calvin Harris) | Best British Pop Single | Nominated | |
| Popjustice £20 Music Prize | 2019 | "Electricity" (with Silk City) | Best British Pop Single | Nominated | |
| Popjustice £20 Music Prize | 2020 | "Physical" | Best British Pop Single | Won | |
| Popjustice £20 Music Prize | 2021 | "Levitating" | Best British Pop Single | Nominated | |
| Popjustice £20 Music Prize | 2024 | "Houdini" | Best British Pop Single | Nominated | |
| Premios Juventud | 2021 | "Un Día (One Day)" (with J Balvin, Bad Bunny & Tainy) | OMG Collaboration | Nominated | |
| Premios Juventud | 2021 | "Un Día (One Day)" (with J Balvin, Bad Bunny & Tainy) | Video with the Best Social Message | Won | |
| Premios MUSA | 2020 | "Don't Start Now" | International Song of the Year | Nominated | |
| Premios MUSA | 2020 | "Un Día (One Day)" (with J Balvin, Bad Bunny & Tainy) | International Collaboration of the Year | Nominated | |
| Premios MUSA | 2020 | Herself | International Artist of the Year | Nominated | |
| Premios MUSA | 2021 | "Cold Heart (Pnau remix)" (with Elton John) | International Song of the Year | Nominated | |
| Premios MUSA | 2021 | "Cold Heart (Pnau remix)" (with Elton John) | International Collaboration of the Year | Nominated | |
| Premios MUSA | 2021 | Herself | International Artist of the Year | Won | |
| Premios Odeón | 2021 | Herself | International Artist | Won | |
| Premios Odeón | 2022 | "Cold Heart (Pnau remix)" (with Elton John) | Best International Song | Nominated | |
| Radio Disney Music Awards | 2018 | "New Rules" | Best Song To Lip Sync To | Won | |
| Radio Disney Music Awards | 2018 | Herself | Breakout Artist of the Year | Nominated | |
| RTHK International Pop Poll Awards | 2018 | Herself | Top Female Artist | Silver | |
| RTHK International Pop Poll Awards | 2019 | Herself | Top Female Artist | Bronze | |
| RTHK International Pop Poll Awards | 2019 | "One Kiss" (with Calvin Harris) | Top Ten International Gold Songs | Won | |
| RTHK International Pop Poll Awards | 2020 | "Don't Start Now" | Top Ten International Gold Songs | Won | |
| RTHK International Pop Poll Awards | 2021 | Herself | Top Female Artist | Silver | |
| Satellite Awards | 2020 | "Swan Song" | Best Original Song | Nominated | |
| SCTV Music Awards | 2017 | Herself | Young and Promising International Artist | Won | |
| Seoul Music Awards | 2025 | "Handlebars" (with Jennie) | Ballad Award | Nominated | |
| Shorty Awards | 2018 | "New Rules" | Best Use of Video | Nominated | |
| Shorty Awards | 2018 | "New Rules" | Best Use of YouTube | Nominated | |
| Shorty Awards | 2018 | "New Rules" | Best in Hospitality | Nominated | |
| Shorty Awards | 2018 | "New Rules" | Best Use of Facebook Video | Nominated | |
| Shorty Awards | 2018 | Herself | Best in Music | Nominated | |
| Shorty Awards | 2018 | Herself | Best Influencer and Celebrity YouTube Campaign | Won | |
| Silver Clef Awards | 2018 | Herself | Best Live Act | Nominated | |
| Silver Clef Awards | 2019 | Herself | Best Female | Won | |
| South Bank Sky Arts Awards | 2021 | Future Nostalgia | Pop | Won | |
| TEC Awards | 2021 | Future Nostalgia | Record Production / Album | Nominated | |
| Teen Choice Awards | 2017 | Herself | Choice Breakout Artist | Nominated | |
| Teen Choice Awards | 2018 | Herself | Choice Female Artist | Nominated | |
| Teen Choice Awards | 2018 | "New Rules" | Choice Song: Female Artist | Nominated | |
| Teen Choice Awards | 2018 | "One Kiss" (with Calvin Harris) | Choice Electronic/Dance Song | Nominated | |
| Teen Choice Awards | 2018 | "One Kiss" (with Calvin Harris) | Choice Summer Song | Nominated | |
| Telehit Awards | 2017 | Herself | Emerging Artist in Networks | Nominated | |
| Telehit Awards | 2018 | Herself | Anglo Artist of the Year | Won | |
| Telehit Awards | 2018 | "One Kiss" (with Calvin Harris) | Featuring of the Year | Won | |
| The O2 | 2022 | Herself | First Time Award | Won | |
| Top 40 Awards | 2020 | Herself | Best International Artist | Won | |
| Top 40 Awards | 2020 | Herself | Best International Live Performance | Won | |
| Top Hit Music Awards | 2021 | Herself | Best International Artist | Won | |
| Tribeca Festival | 2024 | Illusion | Best Music Video | Nominated | |
| UK Music Video Awards | 2017 | "New Rules" | Best Pop Video – UK | Won | |
| UK Music Video Awards | 2017 | "New Rules" | VEVO Must See Award | Nominated | |
| UK Music Video Awards | 2018 | "IDGAF" | Best Pop Video – UK | Won | |
| UK Music Video Awards | 2018 | "One Kiss" (with Calvin Harris) | Best Dance Video – UK | Nominated | |
| UK Music Video Awards | 2020 | "Physical" | Best Production Design in a Video | Nominated | |
| UK Music Video Awards | 2020 | "Physical" | Best Styling in a Video | Nominated | |
| UK Music Video Awards | 2020 | "Physical" | Best Editing in a Video | Nominated | |
| UK Music Video Awards | 2020 | "Physical" | Best Pop Video – UK | Nominated | |
| UK Music Video Awards | 2020 | "Break My Heart" | Best Pop Video – UK | Won | |
| UK Music Video Awards | 2020 | "Break My Heart" | Best Color Grading in a Video | Nominated | |
| UK Music Video Awards | 2020 | "Break My Heart" | Best Visual Effects in a Video | Nominated | |
| UK Music Video Awards | 2020 | "Don't Start Now" (Live in L.A., 2019) | Best Live Video | Nominated | |
| UK Music Video Awards | 2021 | "Love Again" | Best Pop Video – UK | Won | |
| UK Music Video Awards | 2021 | "Fever" (with Angèle) | Best Color Grading in a Video | Nominated | |
| UK Music Video Awards | 2021 | Studio 2054 | Best Music Film | Won | |
| UK Music Video Awards | 2024 | "Illusion" | Best Pop Video – UK | Nominated | |
| Urban Music Awards | 2017 | Herself | Best Pop Act | Nominated | |
| Urban Music Awards | 2020 | Herself | Best Female Act | Nominated | |
| Urban Music Awards | 2020 | Herself | Artist of the Year (UK) | Nominated | |
| Urban Music Awards | 2020 | "Don't Start Now" | Best Music Video | Nominated | |
| Urban Music Awards | 2021 | Herself | Best Female Act | Nominated | |
| Urban Music Awards | 2021 | Herself | Artist of the Year (UK) | Nominated | |
| Variety Hitmakers Awards | 2018 | Herself | Breakthrough Artist of the Year | Won | |
| Variety Hitmakers Awards | 2022 | Herself | Hitmakers of the Year | Won | |
| Virgin Atlantic Attitude Awards | 2020 | Herself | Attitude Music Award | Won | |
| Vogue Women of the Year Awards | 2020 | Herself | Global Entertainer of the Year | Won | |
| WDM Radio Awards | 2018 | Herself | Best Electronic Vocalist | Won | |
| WDM Radio Awards | 2018 | "Scared to Be Lonely" (with Martin Garrix) | Best Bass Track | Won | |
| Webby Awards | 2021 | "Hallucinate" | Animation, General Video | Won | |
| Webby Awards | 2021 | "Dua Lipa Has New Rules for COVID Dating" | Comedy: Longform, General Video | Won | |
| Webby Awards | 2022 | #Levitating Campaign | Branded Entertainment: Music Video | Nominated | |
| Wish 107.5 Music Awards | 2018 | "Blow Your Mind (Mwah)" | Performance of the Year by an International Artist | Won | |
| YouTube Creator Awards | 2016 | Herself | Silver Creator Award | Won | |
| YouTube Creator Awards | 2017 | Herself | Gold Creator Award | Won | |
| YouTube Creator Awards | 2019 | Herself | Diamond Creator Award | Won | |

== Other accolades ==
=== Honorary Ambassador ===
Name of country, year given, and name of title
| Country | Year | Title | Ref. |
|---|---|---|---|
| Republic of Kosovo | 2022 | Honorary Ambassador of Kosovo | |
