= Dua Lipa =

English singer and songwriter (born 1995)

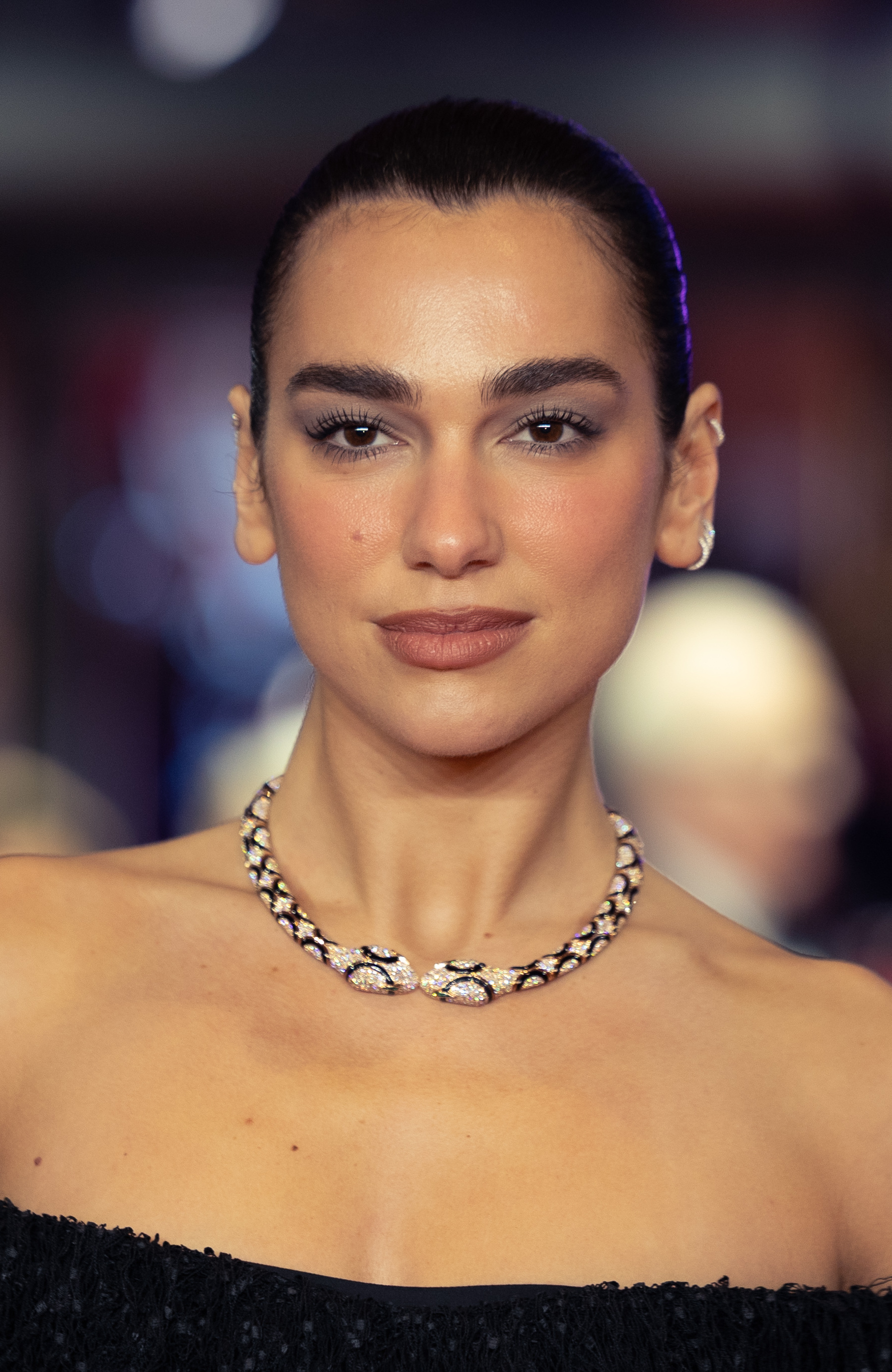
- Lipa in 2026
- Born: 22 August 1995 (age 31); London, England
- Citizenship: United Kingdom; Albania (Note: Lipa was granted Albanian citizenship in 2022.); Kosovo (Note: Lipa was granted Kosovo citizenship in 2025.)
- Occupations: Singer; songwriter
- Years active: 2013–present
- Works: Discography; songs recorded
- Spouse: Callum Turner (m. 2026)
- Awards: Full list
- Musical career
- Genres: Pop; disco; house
- Instruments: Vocals
- Label: Warner
- Website: dualipa.com

Dua Lipa (/ˈduːə ˈliːpə/ DOO-ə LEE-pə; Albanian: [ˈdua ˈlipa]; born 22 August 1995) is an English singer and songwriter. Her accolades include seven Brit Awards and three Grammy Awards.

Lipa signed with Warner Bros. Records in 2014. She released her eponymous debut album in 2017, which peaked at number three on the UK Albums Chart and spawned the singles "Be the One", "IDGAF", and the UK number-one single "New Rules". She was honoured with the Brit Awards for British Female Solo Artist and British Breakthrough Act in 2018. Her second UK number-one single, "One Kiss" with Calvin Harris, was the best-selling song of 2018 in the UK and won the Brit Award for Song of the Year. She later won the Grammy Award for Best New Artist and Best Dance Recording for "Electricity" featuring Silk City in 2019.

Lipa's second album, Future Nostalgia (2020), became her first UK number-one album and peaked in the top-three in the US. Its lead single, "Don't Start Now", scored the longest top-ten stay for a British female artist on the UK Singles Chart and ranked in the top five on the US Billboard Hot 100 year-end chart of 2020. The album's success continued with the follow-up singles "Physical", "Break My Heart", and "Levitating", with the latter topping the Billboard year-end Hot 100 chart of 2021 and receiving a Recording Industry Association of America (RIAA) Diamond certification in the US. Future Nostalgia won the Brit Award for British Album of the Year and the Grammy Award for Best Pop Vocal Album.

Lipa subsequently scored her third and fourth UK number-one singles with the 2021 Elton John duet "Cold Heart (Pnau remix)" and "Dance the Night" from the soundtrack of the film Barbie (2023), wherein she also made her acting debut. Lipa released her third studio album, Radical Optimism (2024), which debuted atop the UK Albums Chart and was preceded by the UK top-ten singles "Houdini", "Training Season", and "Illusion". She also had a supporting role in the 2024 spy film Argylle.

== Early life ==
Dua Lipa was born on 22 August 1995, at Queen Charlotte's and Chelsea Hospital in London, England, the eldest child of Kosovo Albanian parents Anesa (née Rexha) and Dukagjin Lipa from Pristina, FR Yugoslavia (present-day Kosovo). She has a younger sister, Rina, and a younger brother, Gjin. The name Dua was her grandmother's suggestion, and means "love" in Albanian. Her maternal grandmother is of Bosniak descent. Her father's ancestry can be traced back to the city of Peja, Kosovo. Both of her grandfathers were historians.

Lipa was musically influenced by her father, who was the lead singer and guitarist of the Kosovar rock band Oda. Her father continued to play music at home, including his own compositions and songs of artists such as David Bowie, Bob Dylan, Radiohead, Sting, the Police, and Stereophonics. Dua Lipa began singing at the age of five.

Lipa grew up in West Hampstead, London. She attended Fitzjohn's Primary School and her music lessons there included the cello. When she auditioned to enter the school choir, the teacher told her that she could not sing. At the age of nine, she began weekend singing lessons at the Sylvia Young Theatre School. Lipa moved with her family to Pristina after Kosovo declared independence in 2008. There she attended Mileniumi i Tretë School, learned more about the Albanian language, and considered a music career.

At age 15, Lipa moved back alone to London and shared a flat with a family friend. At Parliament Hill School, she passed her A-Levels, then re-entered Sylvia Young Theatre School part-time. She uploaded her own songs to SoundCloud and YouTube. She began posting videos of herself covering songs such as "If I Ain't Got You" (2004) by Alicia Keys and "Beautiful" (2002) by Christina Aguilera on YouTube. Lipa briefly modelled for Topshop before landing a role as a singer in an ITV advertisement for The X Factor in 2013, covering Sister Sledge's 1979 song "Lost in Music". She acquired a producer and a manager.

== Career ==
=== 2013–2018: career beginnings and Dua Lipa ===
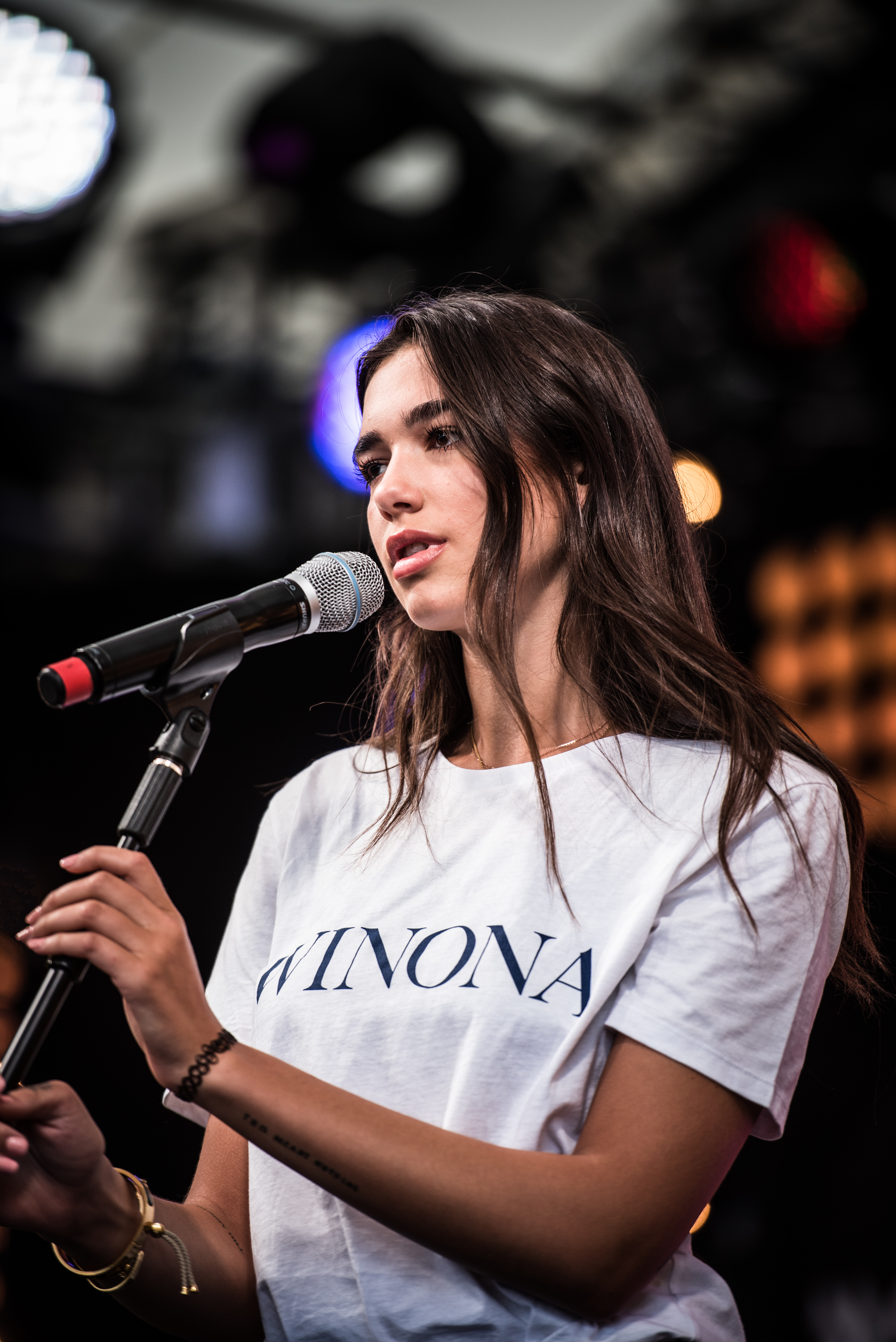
Lipa in 2016

In 2013, Lipa signed a contract with TaP Management, directed by Ben Mawson and Ed Millett, while working as a waitress in a cocktail bar. Lipa was introduced to Mawson by her lawyer, who discouraged her from signing another publishing deal that was offered to her. They then offered her a monthly salary to leave her job and focus on recording music. During one of the sessions Lipa co-wrote the song "Hotter than Hell", which led to her signing a record deal with Warner Bros. Records in 2014. Millett retrospectively elaborated: "Dua was really smart – she signed to Warner Bros. partly because they didn't have a big female pop artist and they needed one. They really wanted her, so she had the focus of the team from day one."

In August 2015, Lipa released her first single, "New Love", produced by Emile Haynie and Andrew Wyatt. Her second single, "Be the One", was issued to European success in October 2015, reaching number one in Belgium, Poland and Slovakia, as well as charting in the top ten in over eleven European territories. In Australia and New Zealand, the song became an airplay success, reaching numbers 6 and 20 respectively. In November 2015, she was revealed as one of the acts to appear on the BBC Sound of... 2016 long list.

We've seen artists who might get half a good song out of 10 writing sessions; with Dua, one in five or one in four is a banger. She gets results out of other people as well, because her personality is so engaging and she is so charismatic. She definitely has that special something.

— Ben Mawson on Lipa's songwriting

Her first tour in the UK and Europe began in January 2016, and concluded in early December 2016. On 18 February 2016, Lipa released her third single, "Last Dance", followed by "Hotter than Hell" on 6 May. The latter was successful particularly in the UK, where it peaked at number 15. On 26 August, her fifth overall single, "Blow Your Mind (Mwah)", was released, peaking at number 30 in the UK. It became the singer's first entry on the US Billboard Hot 100, debuting at number 72. The song also topped the Billboard Dance Club Songs chart and reached number 23 on the Billboard Mainstream Top 40 chart.

Lipa was featured on Sean Paul's single "No Lie", released in November 2016, which reached number ten in the UK. The song became a top-ten hit in ten countries six years after its release, and it became Sean Paul's most-streamed song as of December 2022. The music video (directed by Tim Nackashi) surpassed 1 billion views on YouTube in April 2022. The following month, a documentary about Lipa named See in Blue was commissioned by The Fader. In January 2017, Lipa won the EBBA Public Choice Award, and released the single "Scared to Be Lonely", a collaboration with Martin Garrix, reaching number 14 in the UK.

In May 2017, she performed at the anniversary of Indonesian television channel SCTV and won the award for Young and Promising International Artist at the SCTV Music Awards. Lipa's first album Dua Lipa was released on 2 June 2017. Its sixth single, "New Rules", released in the following month, became Lipa's first number one in the UK, and the first by a female solo artist to reach the top in the UK since Adele's "Hello" in 2015. Her best-selling single to date, the song also charted in the top ten of other countries, including number two in Australia, number six in the US, and number seven in Canada. As of 2024, the music video has streamed over three billion views on YouTube. Lipa performed at the Glastonbury Festival in June. In July, Lipa performed at the We The Fest, an Indonesian music festival in Jakarta. She performed on the BBC's Later... with Jools Holland in October. In December, Lipa was named the most streamed woman of 2017 in the UK by Spotify. She had four singles reach the UK top 10 in 2017, with "Be the One", "New Rules", "No Lie", and "Bridge over Troubled Water", a charity single for the families of the victims of the Grenfell Tower fire in London.

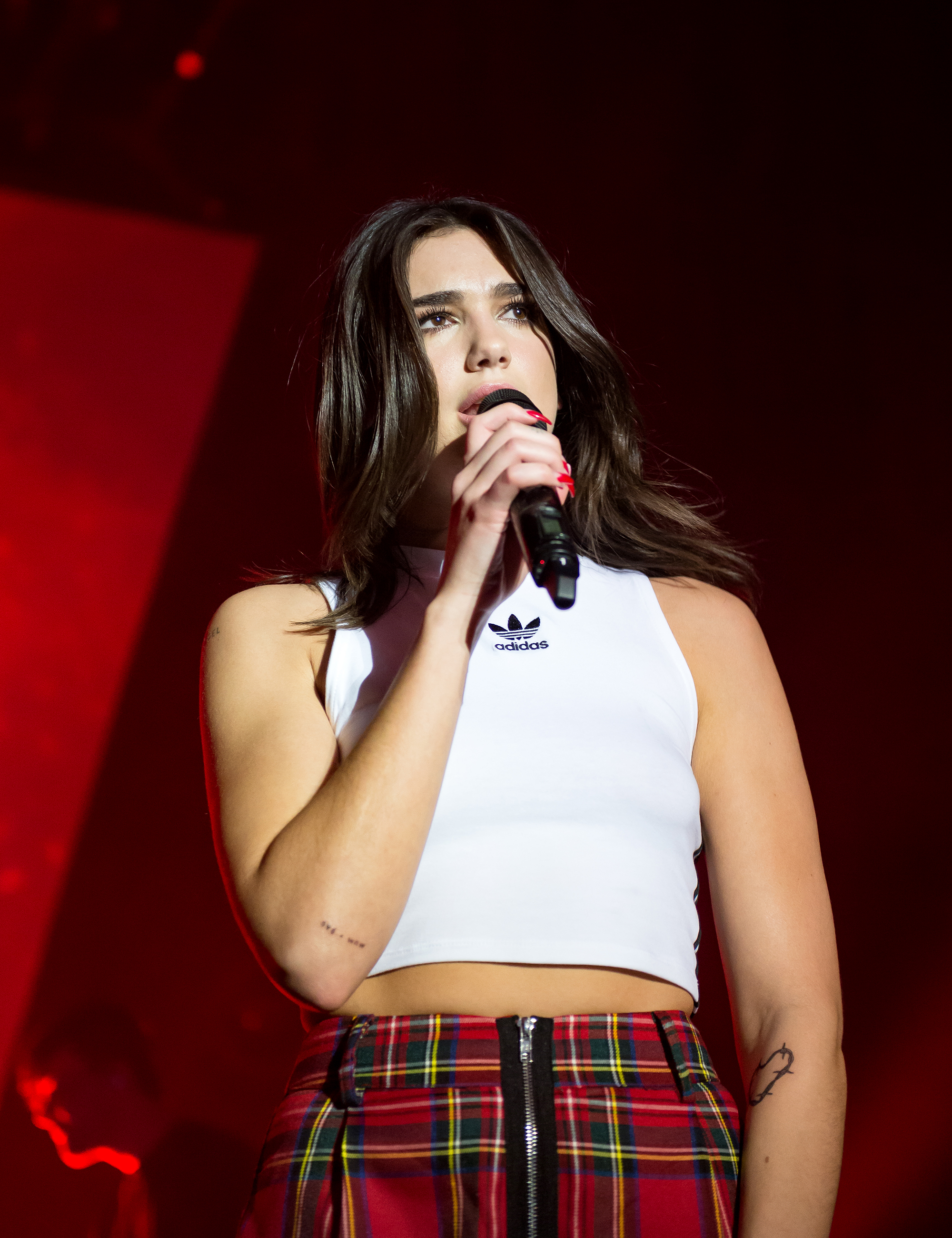
Lipa at the Hollywood Palladium in February 2018

In January 2018, Lipa received nominations in five categories at the Brit Awards, more nominations than any other artist that year. She was nominated for MasterCard British Album of the Year for Dua Lipa, British Single of the Year and British Video of the Year for "New Rules", British Female Solo Artist, and British Breakthrough Act winning the latter two. This was the first time that a female artist had received five nominations. Lipa performed at the Brit Awards ceremony held on 21 February at the O2 Arena in London.

Lipa collaborated with American DJ Whethan on the song "High" for the Fifty Shades Freed soundtrack, released in February 2018. She started working on new material for her second album in January 2018. On 6 April, Lipa and Calvin Harris released the single "One Kiss", which topped the UK Singles Chart on 20 April, making it Lipa's second number one in the chart; Lipa provided the vocals and is also credited as a writer. The single went on to become the biggest selling song in the UK of 2018 and topped the chart for eight consecutive weeks. She performed in the opening ceremony of the 2018 UEFA Champions League Final in Kyiv on 26 May. It was reported that Lipa would be releasing collaborations with other artists coming out later in 2018, such as one with Mark Ronson and Diplo's newly formed superduo Silk City. Ronson later confirmed the song's title would be "Electricity". The song was released on 9 September. Lipa was also featured in "If Only", a song from Italian singer Andrea Bocelli's sixteenth studio album Sì.

Lipa performed at the F1 Singapore Grand Prix in September. In the same month, Lipa endorsed British car brand Jaguar's new electric car, I-PACE. The brand created a remix of Lipa's song "Want To" and launched a service where fans could create their own version of Dua Lipa x Jaguar's song on the "Join the Pace" website, based on their own driving behaviour or the music they listen to, and share it on social media. According to Lipa's team, Jaguar and Lipa set the world record for the "most remixed song ever". In October, the singer released Dua Lipa: The Complete Edition, an expanded version of her debut album that includes three new songs, including the aforementioned "Want To", and her previous collaborations with other artists. This included a collaboration with South Korean girl group Blackpink called "Kiss and Make Up".

=== 2019–2022: Future Nostalgia ===
In January 2019, Lipa released the single "Swan Song" as part of the soundtrack to the 2019 film Alita: Battle Angel. That same month, Lipa stated that she spent the preceding year in the writing process for her second studio album. Lipa commented that the album's sound would be a "nostalgic" pop record that "feels like a dancercise class". In August 2019, Lipa partnered with brand Yves Saint Laurent to endorse their fragrance Libre.

Following the release of its lead single "Don't Start Now", Lipa's second album, Future Nostalgia, and its accompanying tour were announced in December 2019. "Don't Start Now" peaked at number two on both the UK Singles Chart and the US Billboard Hot 100. On the former, it earned the longest top 10 stay for a British female artist and the longest top 10 stay without reaching the summit in that chart's history. The song also peaked at number one on the UK Big Top 40 and the US Billboard Mainstream Top 40 chart. Lipa's second single leading up to the release of the album was "Physical". It was released on 30 January 2020 and the song's music video was released a day later. "Physical" debuted at number 60 on the US Billboard Hot 100. Future Nostalgia was released on 27 March to widespread critical acclaim, following the release of the record's third single "Break My Heart" on 25 March. The album debuted at number two on the Official UK Albums Chart, 5550 copies behind 5 Seconds of Summer's Calm. Future Nostalgia peaked at number one on the Official UK Albums Chart the following week in April 2020, while four of the album's singles entered the top ten of the Official Singles Chart. The album holds the record for having the lowest one-week sales while at the top of the chart in the 21st century; when it was number one—the week beginning 15 May 2020—the album had only 7,317 sales. At the time of the album's release, Lipa became the first British female artist since Vera Lynn to have three top-ten singles in a single calendar year, with Lynn having three in 1952. Lipa eventually overrode this record with the single "Levitating", which also peaked within the top ten on the Billboard Hot 100 chart, becoming her third top-ten in the US overall. Lipa's music video for "Physical" was nominated for Best Art Director at the Berlin Music Video Awards in 2020. The art director of the music video is Anna Colomer Nogué.

On 27 April 2020, DJ Ben Howell released a remix of her song "Hallucinate" with the BBC News theme. Created during the height of the coronavirus lockdown in his flat in Glasgow, Scotland, the remix has garnered more than a million views on YouTube as of July 2023. It was pleasantly received by both Lipa and BBC Radio 1 presenter Greg James, the latter quipping on Twitter "Ben's made you [the BBC] a new theme tune and it's a certified banger. Please change with immediate effect".

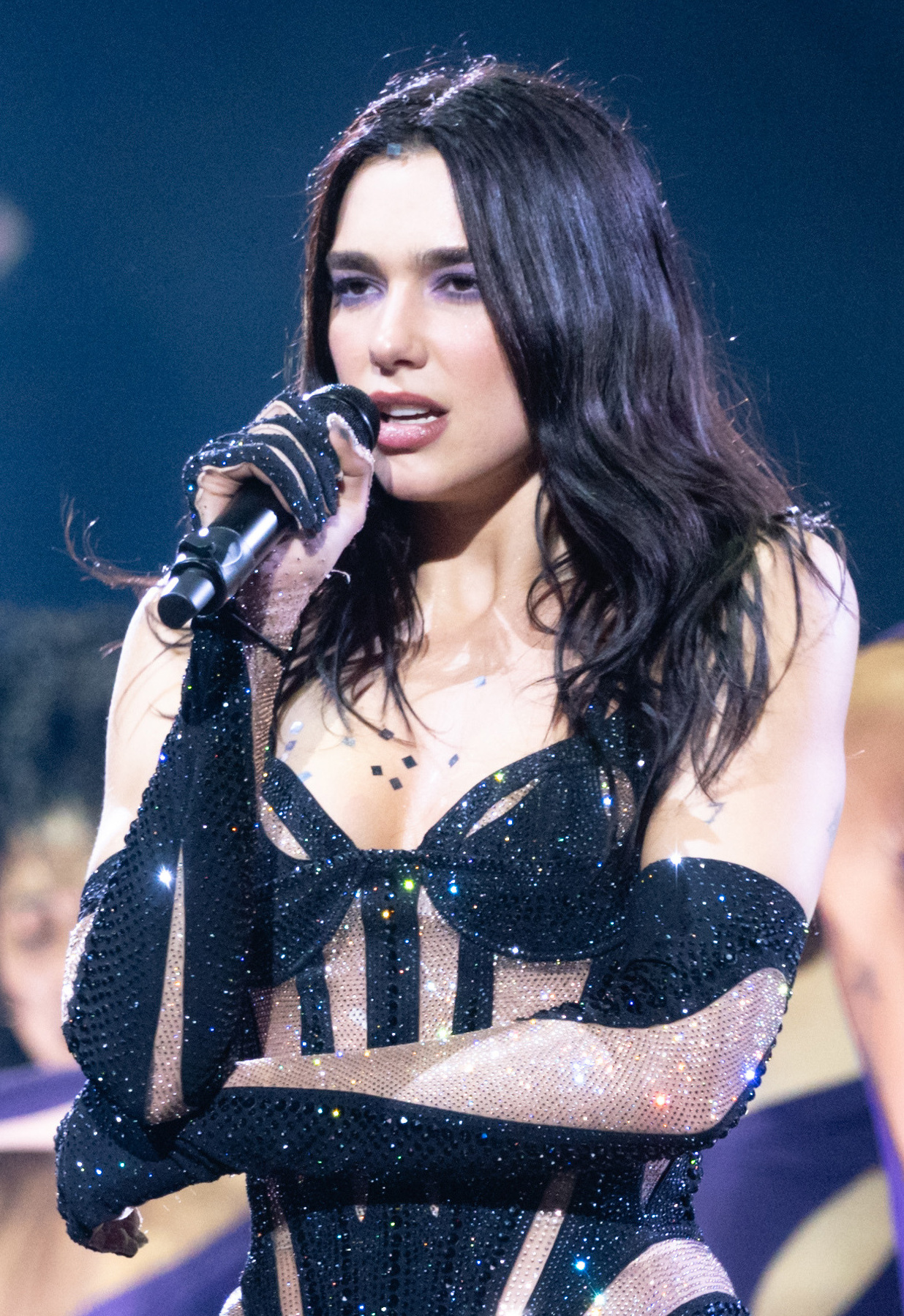
Lipa performing at the O2 Arena, London in May 2022

On 11 August 2020, she was named global ambassador of the French mineral water brand Évian. Lipa made the announcement on social media, where she stated that "it had been an honor" working with the brand. On 13 August, Lipa released a remix of "Levitating" featuring American artists Madonna and Missy Elliott. It served as the lead single from Club Future Nostalgia, a remix collection of Future Nostalgia tracks by the Blessed Madonna and Mark Ronson, which was released on 28 August. On 2 October 2020, Lipa released the second remix of "Levitating" featuring American rapper DaBaby; on the same day, Lipa released the music video for the second remix. On 14 October 2020, Lipa and Belgian singer Angèle were photographed on the set of a music video. Later in the month, the singers announced the release of their collaboration, "Fever"; it was released on 30 October 2020. It is included on the French re-release of Future Nostalgia. Lipa was featured on "Prisoner", a song from Miley Cyrus' seventh studio album Plastic Hearts. The single was released on 19 November 2020 alongside the music video. In November, it was announced that Lipa would be the musical guest on the 19 December episode of Saturday Night Live. On 27 November, Lipa performed in a livestream concert titled Studio 2054, where she sang various songs from Future Nostalgia, a new unreleased track with FKA Twigs, as well as some previous singles such as "New Rules", "One Kiss" and "Electricity". The event featured many special guests like the Blessed Madonna, Angèle, Kylie Minogue and Elton John, among others. Future Nostalgia was the most streamed album by a woman (and fifth most streamed album overall) on Spotify in 2020.

On 11 February 2021, Lipa released a single titled "We're Good", along with Future Nostalgia: The Moonlight Edition. On 26 February 2021, Aleyna Tilki released her debut English-language single "Retrograde", co-written by Lipa. Lipa released the song "Can They Hear Us" from the soundtrack of the film Gully on 4 June 2021. On 13 August 2021, Lipa worked again with Elton John on the song "Cold Heart (Pnau remix)", released as the lead single from John's studio album The Lockdown Sessions. On 15 October, the single reached the number-one spot on the UK Singles Chart, becoming Lipa's third song to achieve this feat. In February 2022, Lipa launched a weekly lifestyle newsletter entitled Service95 as well as its accompanying podcast Dua Lipa: At Your Service.

On 18 February 2022, a source close to the issue confirmed to Variety that Dua Lipa had parted ways with her longtime management business, Ben Mawson and Ed Millet's TaP Management. Contrary to other reports, the insider claims that the singer is not currently meeting with other management firms, but she will do so in the future. On 1 March 2022, reggae band Artikal Sound System filed a suit against Lipa and her label Warner Records alleging copyright infringement, asserting similarities between "Levitating" and their 2017 song "Live Your Life". In June 2023, the suit was dropped with prejudice. A second suit by songwriters L. Russell Brown and Sandy Linzer claimed that "Levitating" infringed on their 1979 disco song "Wiggle and Giggle All Night".

On 11 March 2022, Lipa and Megan Thee Stallion released "Sweetest Pie" accompanied by its music video. The song marks their first collaboration and serves as the lead single from Megan's second studio album Traumazine. On 27 May, Lipa collaborated with Calvin Harris and Young Thug to release "Potion", serving as the lead single from Harris' sixth studio album Funk Wav Bounces Vol. 2. It marked the second collaboration between Harris and Lipa following their 2018 single "One Kiss".

=== 2023–present: Acting debut and Radical Optimism ===
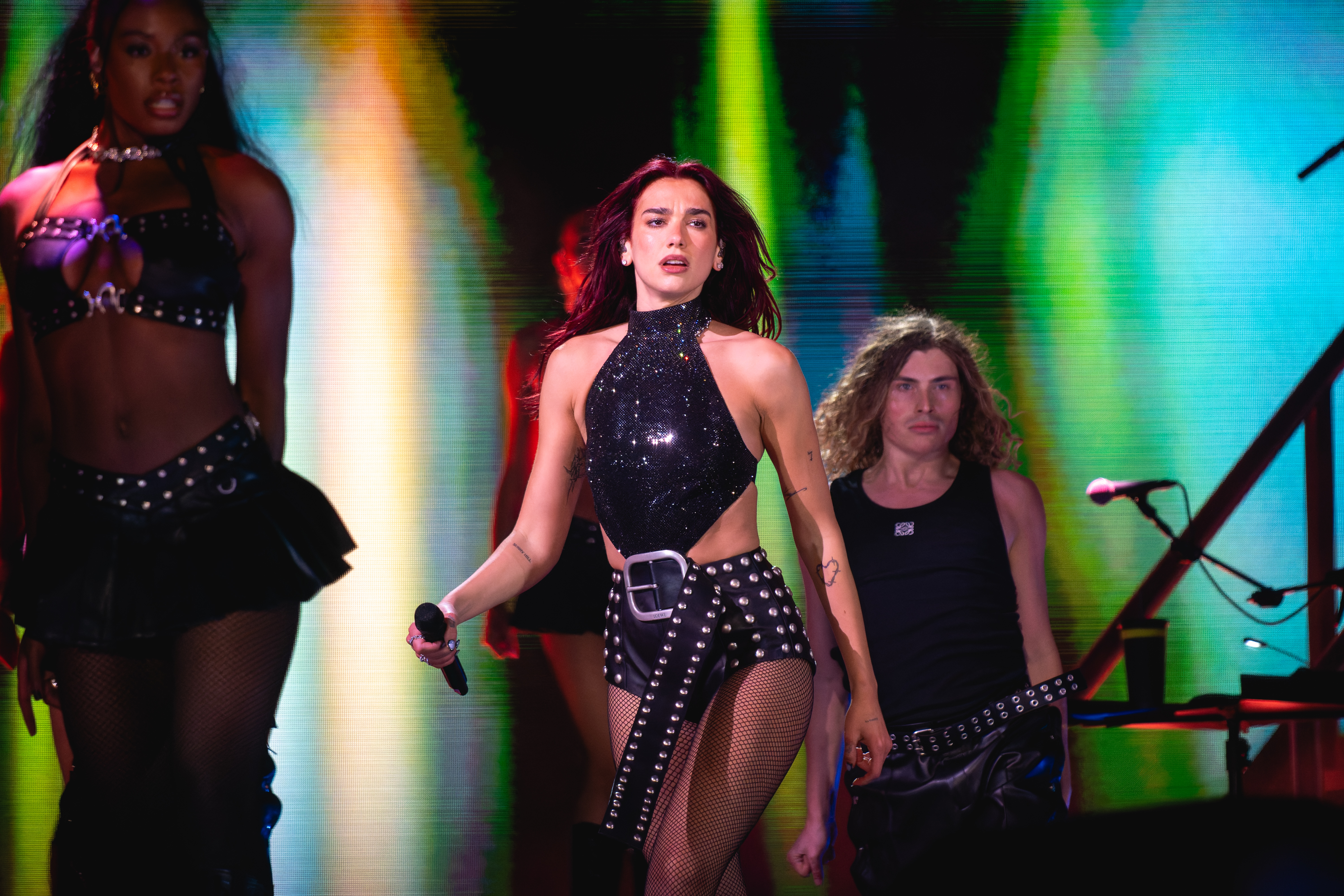
Lipa headlining Glastonbury Festival on 28 June 2024

On 26 May 2023, Lipa released "Dance the Night" as the lead single of the Barbie film soundtrack. Lipa made her acting debut in the movie, portraying Mermaid Barbie. In November 2023, Lipa acquired full ownership of all her songs, music, and publishing rights, in a new deal she completed with her former music publisher TaP Music. The deal included all of her master recordings from her entire music catalogue, which by February 2024, had reached 40 billion streams.

On 9 November 2023, Lipa released the lead single from her third studio album titled "Houdini". On the day of its release, she said that Kevin Parker, who produced the song with Danny L Harle, was among her "core collaborators" on the album. Spin referred to Harle as the co-producer of the record. The follow-up singles, "Training Season" and "Illusion", were released on 15 February 2024 and 11 April 2024, respectively. The album titled Radical Optimism followed on 3 May 2024. She continued her acting career with a starring role in the 2024 spy action comedy Argylle.

In March 2024, Dua Lipa announced she would do a short tour of European arenas in June of the same year. She performed at the Arena of Nîmes, the Waldbühne in Berlin and the Pula Arena, all of which are amphitheatres. In June, she headlined at Glastonbury Festival 2024, closing the festival's Pyramid Stage on 28 June. On 18 March 2024, Lipa announced the Radical Optimism Tour, a concert tour in support of the album. On 17 October, she performed at the Royal Albert Hall in London for an ITV television special titled An Evening with Dua Lipa, where she sang her biggest hits and songs from Radical Optimism, backed by the Heritage Orchestra. A remix of "These Walls" featuring Belgian singer Pierre de Maere, was released as the fourth single from Radical Optimism on 8 November 2024. On 19 November, she announced the release of her first live album titled Dua Lipa Live from the Royal Albert Hall for 6 December, preceding the broadcast of An Evening with Dua Lipa on 8 December.

In May 2026, Lipa filed a $15m lawsuit against Samsung over unauthorised use of her image on television boxes.

== Fashion ventures ==
Lipa landed a modeling contract with Next Models after gaining popularity as a musician. She has been on the cover of several magazines. She was in the cover of the "Boom Boom Tick" editorial for Elle's January 2016 issue. In April 2016, she was again in an editorial of Elle. She was on a supplemental cover of British Vogue in November 2016. She starred an editorial for the January 2017 issue of V. In the same month, she was on the cover for issue 102 of Clash. In March 2017, she became a global ambassador for the American shoe company, Foot Locker, to present women's collections offered by the brand. She was in an editorial for Interview, released in April 2017. She modelled for an editorial of Paper, published on 6 June 2017. She was featured in the summer 2017 issue of Teen Vogue, in an editorial titled "Fine Tuned". She was in an editorial for the June 2017 issue of InStyle. She was in an editorial called "Game Changers" for the Fall 2017 issue of V. She was in the Fall/Winter 2017–18 advertising campaign of the Italian brand Patrizia Pepe, as well as recorded a cover of the song "Bang Bang (My Baby Shot Me Down)" (1966) as a soundtrack for the commercial for the said campaign. She was on the cover and appeared in an editorial for the November 2017 issue of Evening Standard. In the same month, she released her second collaboration with the brand Foot Locker for its autumn/winter collection. In January 2018, she was part of a promotional clip for an Adidas Originals campaign called "Original Is Never Finished". She was on the cover of April 2018 issue of Teen Vogue. She was on one of the covers for issue 113 of V titled "The Music Issue", published in May 2018 as a limited edition. She partnered with the fashion brand Nyden on a project to create four clothing collections, but it failed and Lipa "discontinued" her work with the brand.

She was on the cover of British GQ for its May 2018 issue. She was on the cover for the May 2018 issue of the Turkish edition of Vogue. She was on the cover for the June 2018 issue of the British edition of Elle. In October 2018, she was part of an Adidas campaign called "Here to Create" in which she wore branded clothes. She appeared in a Billboard editorial called "Grammy Preview" alongside Post Malone and Ella Mai. She starred on the cover for the January 2019 issue of British Vogue and an editorial called "Youth Quake". She was the image for the Pepe Jeans London spring/summer 2019 collection campaign, settling down as the first musician to be a global ambassador for the brand. Months later, she launched her first-ever capsule with the same brand for the brand's autumn/winter collection, where she designed clothing inspired by the fashion of the 90s and early 2000s. She had spent part of her childhood in London and remembered her mother talking to her in a Pepe Jeans store in Portobello Road; the collection included chain mail dresses, "casual" denim outfits and garments based on Lipa's "style", which were released in September 2019.

Lipa was on the cover of the May 2019 issue of Elle. She starred on one of the four covers in the first issue and an editorial of the re-launch of The Face released in September 2019. She was on the cover and an editorial for the October 2019 issue of the Spanish edition of Vogue. She starred in a Vogue sitcom clip set in the 90s titled "Dua's World", where she wore the "best" collections of New York Fashion Week. She released her second design collaboration with Pepe Jeans London for its spring/summer 2020 collection, which was inspired by the fashion of the late 1980s and early 1990s, and included "oversized" blazers, cropped knitwear, bodycon dresses, and "metallic" miniskirts. She was on the cover and in an editorial called "True to form" for the April 2020 issue of Vogue Australia.

She appeared in a Rolling Stone editorial published in April 2020 to discuss her second studio album Future Nostalgia (2020). She was on the cover of the Elle May 2020 issue and in an editorial titled "Dua Lipa Gets Physical", and months later, she was on the cover for its Canadian and British editions. She was on the cover for the June 2020 issue of British GQ. She was on one of two covers for W's "The Music Issue", published in September 2020. Lipa released her third design collaboration with Pepe Jeans London for its autumn/winter 2020 collection, titled "Denim Decades". Inspired by each decade since the brand started selling denim, Lipa described it as her last collaboration with Pepe Jeans London.

In November 2020, she signed a multi-year partnership with Puma, becoming the global ambassador of the brand. She was on the cover of the December 2020 issue of Attitude. She appeared on the cover of the February 2021 issue of British Vogue. In the same month, she was on the cover of issue 1348 of Rolling Stone. She was on the cover of the March 2021 issue of Time, representing the 100 Next list about the "future 100 most influential people in the world". In the same month, she appeared on the cover of The New York Times' "Music Issue". She designed her outfit at the 63rd Annual Grammy Awards red carpet featuring a dress inspired by the Aurora Borealis in collaboration with the fashion brand Versace. She was in a Puma brand campaign called "She Moves Us", in which she designed a shoe called "Mayze", released in April 2021. In June 2021, Lipa was announced as the face of Versace's Fall-Winter 2021 campaign.

=== Dress style and endorsements ===
Lipa at the 63rd Annual Grammy Awards, 2021

Dua Lipa has been described by the media as a fashion icon. For a Versace dress and Bulgari diamonds that she wore, she was rated as one of the "best dressed" celebrities of the 61st Annual Grammy Awards ceremony by various media. For her 1990s-inspired Alexander Wang dress, she was rated as one of the "best dressed" celebrities at the 62nd Annual Grammy Awards ceremony. For a Versace dress and Bulgari jewellery that she wore, she was rated as one of the "best dressed" celebrities at the 63rd Annual Grammy Awards ceremony.

She released a limited-edition lip gloss called "Cremesheen Glass" in collaboration with MAC Cosmetics as part of its "Future Forward" campaign. She became the face of Yves Saint Laurent's "Libre" perfume in a campaign launched in September 2019. For the campaign, she recorded a promotional cover of the song "I'm Free" (1965), which was featured in advertisements for her campaigns with the brand. Later, she was the face of a new version of the same perfume called "Libre Intense". She became an ambassador for the mineral water brand Évian in July 2020. In March 2021, she performed an a cappella of her song "Levitating" (2020) for an advertisement for Évian's "Drink True" campaign.

In February 2024, Dua Lipa was promoted to global ambassador for YSL Beauty. Previously, she had been the face of the "Libre" fragrance since 2019. Her appointment to global ambassador followed a wipe of the YSL Beauty Instagram account.

Since 28 May 2026, Dua Lipa recommends over 130 places to eat, sleep, and play for Service95 on Google Maps in New York, Los Angeles, London, Tokyo and elsewhere.

=== Modelling ===
On 24 September 2021, Lipa made her runway debut at Versace's Spring/Summer 2022 show at Milan Fashion Week, which was soundtracked by songs from her album Future Nostalgia (2020).

== Artistry and influences ==
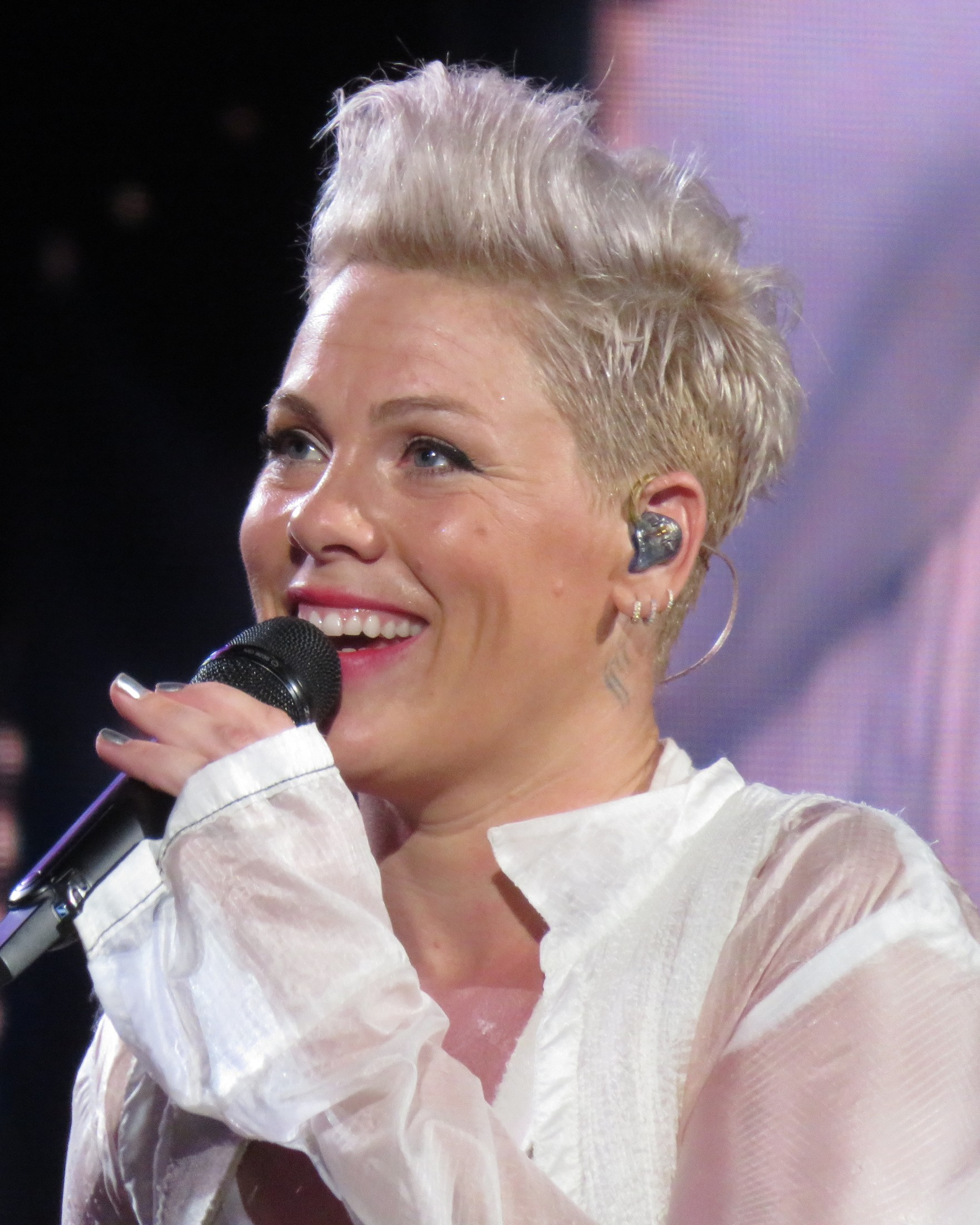
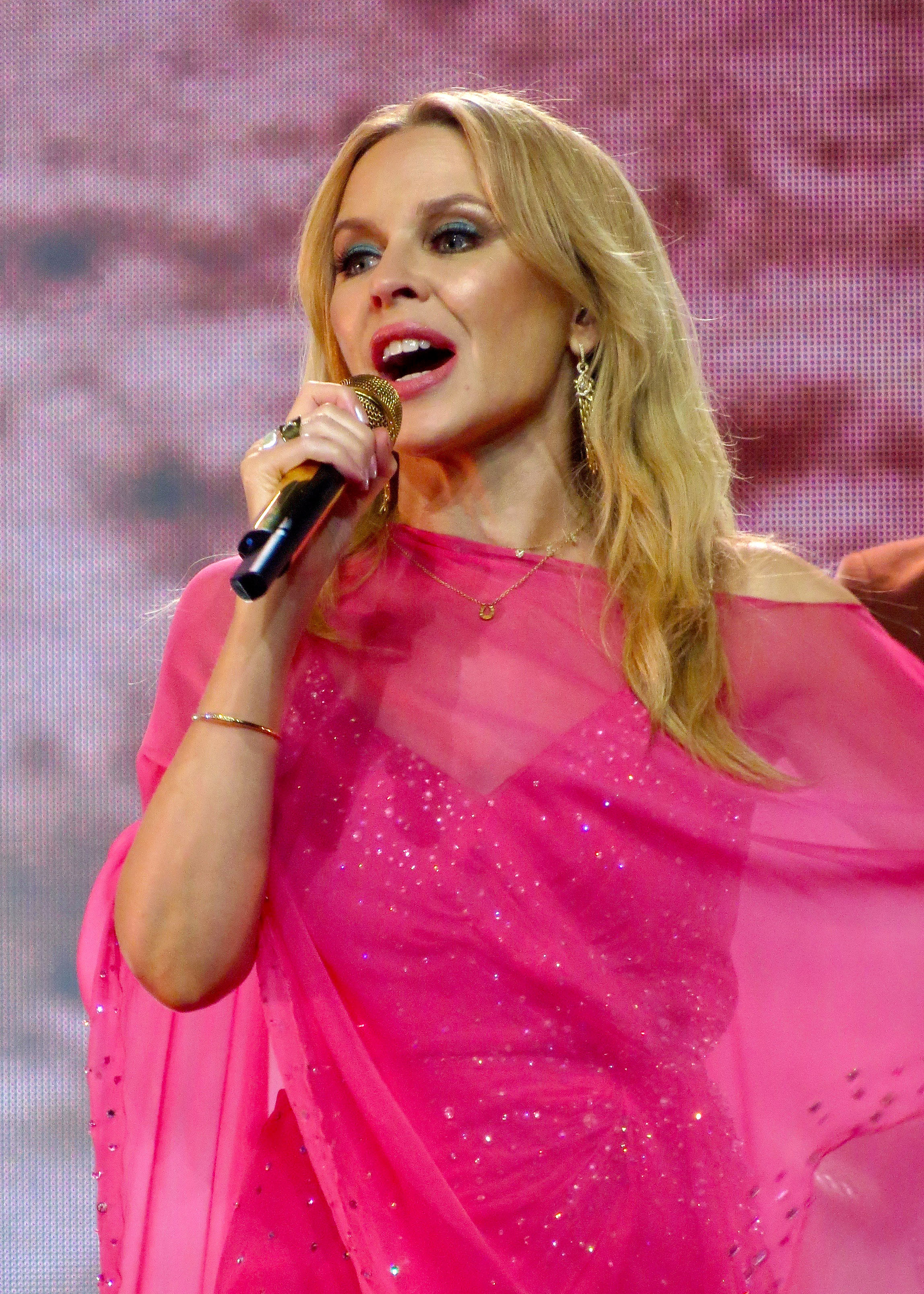
Artists such as Pink and Kylie Minogue have influenced Lipa.

The media have described Lipa as having a mezzo-soprano or contralto vocal range. Her music is primarily pop, and has also been described as disco and house with elements of R&B. Stylistically, her music has been described as dance-pop, synth-pop, dream pop, alternative pop, and nu-disco subgenres. She describes her musical style as being "dark pop". She is also noted for singing in a "distinct, husky, low register", and her "sultry" tone. Regarding her songwriting process, Lipa states she usually comes to the studio with a concept and starts developing the song with her co-writers. She cites Kylie Minogue, Pink, Nelly Furtado, Jamiroquai, Prince, Kendrick Lamar, and Chance the Rapper among her musical influences. "My idea of pop has been P!nk and Christina Aguilera and Destiny's Child and Nelly Furtado", said Lipa in a GQ interview in 2018. Her second studio album Future Nostalgia (2020) was inspired by artists that she listened to during her teens, including Gwen Stefani, Madonna, Moloko, Blondie and Outkast.

Lipa's stage presence was met with criticism in the early stages of her career. A YouTube comment on her performance of "New Rules" at the 2018 BRIT Awards saying "I love her lack of energy, go girl give us nothing" became an internet meme, subjecting Lipa to ridicule. Lipa credited this criticism as motivation to improve her stage presence.

== Impact ==
A study conducted by the Office for National Statistics revealed that the number of people born with the name "Dua" in England and Wales was 63 in 2017, the year Lipa earned her first UK number-one song with "New Rules"; this increased to 126 in 2019. In May 2018, she was included on British Vogue's inaugural list of the 25 most influential British women of 2018, with Lipa being the youngest on the list at the age of 22. Its review said her 2017 song "New Rules" is an "anthem of female empowerment [that] laid out a blueprint for modern sex lives", and described her as being a "culture definer".

Lyndsey Havens from Billboard credited Lipa as being the protagonist in disco's revival in 2020 through her song "Don't Start Now" (2019). People called her "the Future of Pop" due to the success of her sophomore album, Future Nostalgia. She inspired the French photographer, Hugo Comte, in his first photo-book, and inspired the stage name of Mexican influencer and singer Domelipa. She was included in Time's 100 Next list, with Australian singer Kylie Minogue writing the accompanying essay and describing Lipa as a "shining star". Mark Sutherland and Jem Aswad from Variety rated Lipa as being one of the most impactful women in the global entertainment industry.

Several wax figures of Dua Lipa are found at Madame Tussauds Wax Museums in major cities around the world.

== Achievements ==
Lipa has received several accolades throughout her career, including seven Brit Awards from nineteen nominations, three Grammy Awards from ten nominations, two MTV Video Music Award from twenty-three nominations, two MTV Europe Music Awards from sixteen nominations, two American Music Award from seven nominations, three iHeartRadio Music Award from nineteen nominations, nine Spotify 1 billion streams plaques, and one Bambi Award. Lipa has received two Guinness World Records; in 2020 for most tickets sold for a livestreamed concert by a solo female artist, and in 2021 for most monthly listeners on Spotify for a female artist, but without surpassing the all-time peak achieved by Ariana Grande the year prior. Dua Lipa won the Top Dance/Electronic Song award at the 2024 Billboard Music Awards for her track Houdini, which topped the Hot Dance/Electronic Songs chart for 17 weeks.

Time magazine included her in the Time 100 list of the 100 most influential people in the world in 2024. Billboard ranked Lipa at number 25 on its 2025 "Top 100 Women Artists of the 21st Century" list.

== Political views and activism ==
=== Feminism and LGBT ===
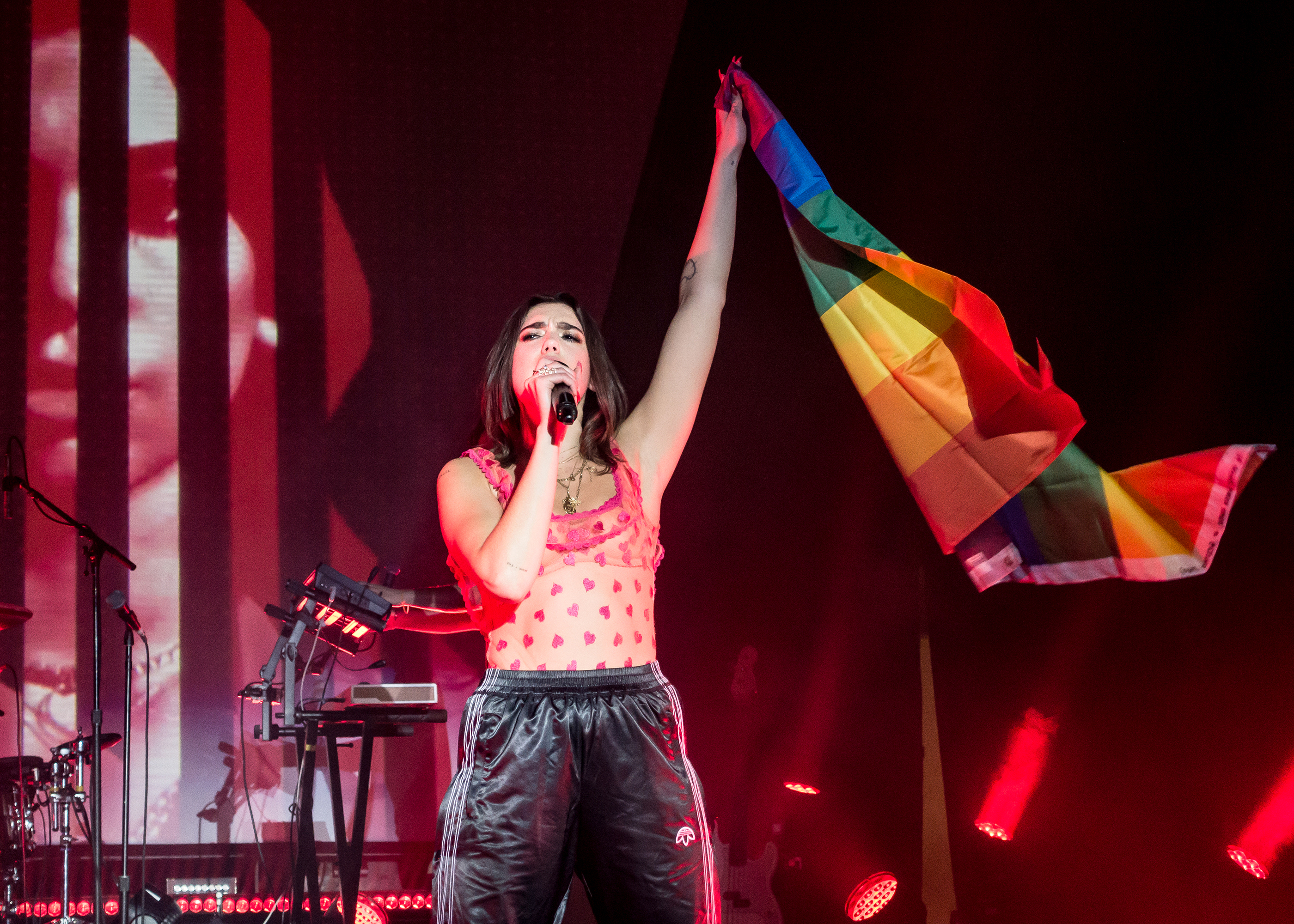
Lipa raising an LGBT flag in a presentation at the Hollywood Palladium in Los Angeles in 2018

Lipa identifies as a feminist. She has spoken out against sexism within the music industry, using social media to raise awareness of women's problems. Lipa has advocated for social equality for the LGBT community. On 12 February 2018, she raised a rainbow flag while performing her song "Be the One" in a presentation at the Hollywood Palladium in Los Angeles as part of The Self-Titled tour. On the 2018 Brit Awards red carpet, she wore a white rose dress in support of the Time's Up movement. Additionally, at the same event, she stated in her acceptance speech for an award her delight at having "women present in these stages" and more "women winning awards". She explained that her perception of feminism is not about misandry, but demanding the same opportunities. In September 2018, some fans were removed by security from a Lipa concert in the National Exhibition and Convention Center of Shanghai for allegedly waving rainbow flags, despite homosexuality being decriminalised in China in 1997. In response, Lipa said she was "proud" of and "grateful" to the people who showed their pride at the show.

She participated in a short film for an initiative called Global Feminism, directed by Annie Lennox's The Circle in association with Apple Music and released on 7 March 2019 ahead of International Women's Day. The clip intended to raise awareness of misogyny, rape, and violence against women. In April 2019, she showed her support for LGBT rights in Brunei by calling for a boycott against the hotel interests of the Sultan of Brunei, Hassanal Bolkiah, after a penal code punishing homosexuality with death came into force in Brunei. During a Billboard Women in Music event, she used her Powerhouse Award acceptance speech to highlight that women "still have a lot to do for real equality", in which she also complained about the "lack of diversity" among the artists of the Billboard Hot 100 and asked for the continued encouragement to "all the young girls out there to be the powerhouses of the future."

Lipa was the headliner party host for the 2020 Sydney Gay and Lesbian Mardi Gras parade, and was part of the parade, before performing several songs. In July 2020, she signed an open letter to the UK government, being received by the then Minister for Women and Equalities, Liz Truss, to request the banning of conversion therapy.

=== Albania and Kosovo ===
On 18 July 2020, Lipa shared a post on her Instagram story explaining "why Kosovo is not and will never be Serbia", urging followers to sign a petition which called for Apple to include Kosovo in its mapping services as an independent state. The next day, she published on her social media an image of a banner containing an irredentist map of Greater Albania that reflected parts of Albania, Kosovo, Serbia, Greece and North Macedonia as one nation, appended with the definition of the word "autochthonous". As the banner is commonly associated with extreme Albanian nationalism, she received a backlash on social media, where she was accused of ethnic nationalism and fascism. She later said that her post had been "misinterpreted" by people who promote ethnic separatism, an ideology that she "completely rejects".

In July 2021, through her Sunny Hill Foundation, Lipa joined an initiative that was launched by the Municipality of Tirana, called "Adopt a Kindergarten". The aim of the project was to reconstruct a kindergarten that was severely damaged by the 2019 Albania earthquake. She said, "The kindergarten will be very beautiful, and I am very proud that Sunny Hill Foundation is a part of it. Let's see better things for our country. I am very proud to be Albanian." The kindergarten was completed in October 2021 and was named "Sunny Hill Kindergarten".

In August 2022, Lipa was named an Honorary Ambassador of Kosovo by the President of Kosovo Vjosa Osmani. In response, Lipa wrote that it was an "honor and a privilege to be able to represent my country all over the world" and that she supports the right of Kosovans "to visa liberalization, freedom to travel and to dream big".

After endorsing and campaigning for U.S. Senator Bernie Sanders in the 2020 Democratic primaries, Lipa expressed support for Joe Biden to become the U.S. president at a virtual event aimed at Albanian Americans later that year during the general election season, arguing that the Kosovars "owed" support to Biden because he was against the massacre and ethnic cleansing of Albanians by having supported the NATO bombing of Yugoslavia. In January 2021, she published a call to her Instagram followers to encourage Kosovo citizens to vote in the 2021 Kosovan parliamentary election.

In July 2026, Lipa expressed support for the ongoing Flamingo Revolution protests in Albania during an episode of her Service95 Book Club podcast with Albanian author Lea Ypi. She described the demonstrations as "inspiring", shared protesters' concerns about transparency surrounding a proposed luxury resort in a protected coastal area, and criticised the removal of environmental protections without public consultation.

In September 2026, following the conviction of former Kosovo Liberation Army leader and prime minister of Kosovo Hashim Thaçi for war crimes, Lipa posted the logo of KLA logo and the message "Freedom has a name".

=== Palestine and Israel ===
In June 2020, Lipa shared an Instagram post that criticised the Israel Defense Forces' treatment of Palestinians and showed Israeli soldiers detaining Palestinian minors. The post also referred to "fake Jews in the Israeli government" and "fake Christians in the midwest [United States]" who it said had created Hamas for people to "believe that Hamas is the reason for the decades worth of occupation, oppression, ethnic cleansing, and murder." An Im Tirtzu petition signed by over three thousand people was sent to the Israeli Minister of Defense, Benny Gantz, and the Israeli Minister of Culture and Sport, Hili Tropper, demanding that Lipa's songs be banned from Israeli Army Radio and Galgalatz due to what Im Tirtzu said was "the incitement against IDF soldiers, the antisemitism, the blood libel, conspiracy theories and the blatant lies in the post" shared by Lipa. In response, the Army Radio said that "Galgalatz does not boycott any artist" and "the songs are chosen at the discretion of the editors of each segment."

In May 2021, after expressing solidarity for the death of Palestinian civilians due to the 2021 Israel–Palestine crisis, Lipa criticised The New York Times for publishing an advertisement characterising her, along with Bella and Gigi Hadid, as antisemitic.

In October 2023, Lipa signed an open letter for the Artists4Ceasefire campaign alongside 185 other artists, urging President Biden to push for a ceasefire and an end to the killing of civilians amid the 2023 Israeli invasion of the Gaza Strip, and for a corridor into Gaza to be established for humanitarian aid.

=== The UK and the US ===
In November 2018, Lipa expressed dissatisfaction over the withdrawal of the United Kingdom from the European Union due to Brexit because according to her personal experience, "no refugee leaves their country without having to." In June 2019, she made public her support for the ongoing Sudanese transition to democracy on social media by sharing a blue image that showed the phrase "Stand with Sudan", where she detailed her rejection of the Khartoum massacre writing about all "women, men and children fighting for a peaceful transition to democracy". She said the event was: an attempt to inflict "brutal murder and rape" by government forces on those who try to call for democracy; a "violation of the freedom rights" of Sudanese citizens for blocking their internet; and a "violation of human rights". In December 2019, Lipa endorsed the Labour Party led by Jeremy Corbyn in the 2019 United Kingdom general election, comparing the policies of both Labour and Conservatives on various issues on social media and affirming that it was "the most important election in a generation". She characterised Boris Johnson's victory in the election as a "total disaster" for the UK.

Lipa is in favour of universal health care and wondered why people were not protesting about it. In addition, she said that in her country of birth, the United Kingdom, the National Health Service is considered a "right". In July 2020, Lipa supported a campaign called "Let the Music Play", in which she signed an open letter sent to the then-Culture Secretary, Oliver Dowden, calling for support from the government of the United Kingdom for the UK's live music industry's economic loss under the COVID-19 pandemic.

In August 2020, she urged her Instagram followers to vote against Donald Trump in the 2020 United States presidential election.

=== Other countries ===
In June 2019, she made public her support for the ongoing Sudanese transition to democracy on social media by sharing a blue image that showed the phrase "Stand with Sudan", where she detailed her rejection of the Khartoum massacre, writing about all "women, men and children fighting for a peaceful transition to democracy". She said the event was an attempt to inflict "brutal murder and rape" by government forces on those who try to call for democracy, a "violation of the freedom rights" of Sudanese citizens for blocking their internet and a "violation of human rights".

Lipa has also continuously raised awareness to the detrimental consequences of the Taliban takeover of 2021 in Afghanistan through her social media and her lifestyle newsletter Service95.

On 13 November 2022, Lipa dismissed reports that she was to perform at the opening ceremony of that year's FIFA World Cup, and denied ever being involved in any negotiation to perform, calling out the tournament's host country of Qatar for human rights violations.

Lipa has expressed support for Ukraine amidst the Russo-Ukrainian war. In April 2026, it was reported that Lipa and her Service95 platform helped fund a pickup truck with medical aid delivered to the 1st Separate Medical Battalion of Ukraine.

== Philanthropy ==
Lipa and her father, Dukagjin Lipa, co-created the Sunny Hill Foundation in 2016 to raise funds to help people in Kosovo experiencing financial difficulties. In August 2018, Lipa organised the Sunny Hill Festival to raise money for the foundation. The then-Mayor of Pristina, Shpend Ahmeti, awarded her the Pristina Key, the first time one had been awarded. Lipa went on to host the festival for the second year in 2019, with Miley Cyrus included as part of the performer line-up. In mid-November 2018, Lipa was part of a campaign organised by UNICEF called "Go Blue", in support of children's rights on World Children's Day (20 November). Her contribution consisted of a short video about dressing in blue or displaying the colour blue, with her in a studio re-recording the lyrics of her song "Be the One" (2015). She changed the word "red" to "blue" in the song for the occasion. In December 2018, Lipa participated in a benefit concert for Ellie Goulding's "Streets of London" annual charity event at Wembley Arena, which "funds specialist support for people who are homeless in London and raises awareness about homelessness". In April 2019, she became a UNICEF supporter during a three-day visit to a camp for refugee children and youth in Beirut, Lebanon. The camp included many uprooted by the conflict in Syria who did not have "adequate" health care or education, and Lipa also visited young Palestinians and Syrians in the Bourj el-Barajneh refugee camp. She subsequently supported a campaign by her management company with a plan to raise £100,000 to help raise awareness of charities such as The Black Dog and CALM.

Lipa asked for better mental health care for artists in creative industries, as she was "shocked" to read that "suicide rates amongst women working in the arts are almost 70% higher than in the world population". She described mental health as the "issue of our generation". On 26 November 2019, following the 2019 Albania earthquake, Lipa asked fans for donations and support for victims. To raise funds, she co-released a limited edition line of t-shirts called "Pray for Albania" in collaboration with Albanian fashion designers. All of the proceeds went to families and victims affected by the seismic event. On 15 March 2020, she asked her fans to make donations to the UNHCR agency to deal with the COVID-19 pandemic because refugees are "the most vulnerable on this planet" and they "often live in crowded places" with "limited health services". In the same month, she was part of a television special called "Home Fest" on The Late Late Show with James Corden From His Garage, with the goal of raising money for CDC and Feed the Children, where she performed her song, "Don't Start Now" (2019), from an apartment in London. On 16 May 2020, she did a live performance of her song "Break My Heart" (2020) on the television special, Graduate Together: America Honors the High School Class of 2020, aimed at high school students whose graduation ceremonies and proms were cancelled due to the COVID-19 pandemic. At the end of May 2020, she participated in a digital event called "Dream with Us", which consisted of a streaming concert, and a portion of proceeds would go to organisations which help fight COVID-19.

She took part in a charitable project operated by BBC Radio 1 for a cover version of "Times Like These" released on 23 April 2020 for the Live Lounge segment. She was part of the charity supergroup Live Lounge Allstars, in which each member recorded and filmed their contribution to the song from their respective households to encourage social distancing. Profits from the single would primarily go to Children in Need, Comic Relief, and the COVID-19 Solidarity Response Fund. She used social media to encourage Lebanese citizens to donate blood to victims affected by the 2020 Beirut explosion. She donated €5,000 to the Theatre of Dodona so that the venue could have its own ticket system and website. She was part of an initiative organised by Belgian singer Angèle and the KickCancer Foundation to fund research against childhood cancer, and it was about a charity raffle in which Lipa offered a manuscript of her song "Don't Start Now" (2019) as a prize. She performed at the 2021 Elton John AIDS Foundation Academy Award Party virtually to support the Elton John AIDS Foundation in combatting HIV disease. The event raised US$3 million.

== Personal life ==
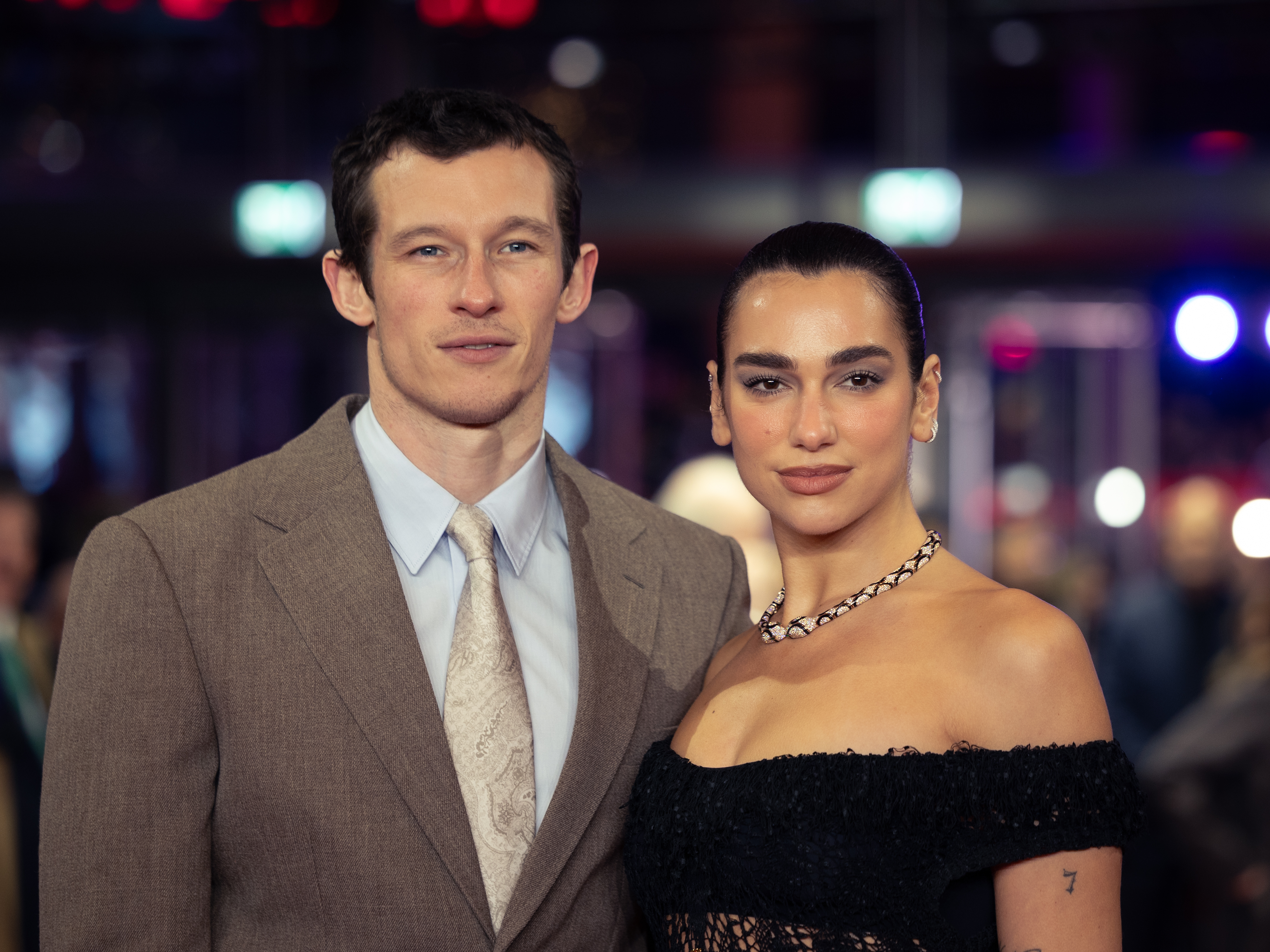
Lipa with her husband Callum Turner in 2026

Lipa was in an on-again, off-again relationship with English chef Isaac Carew from 2015 to June 2019. From 2017 to January 2018, she dated American musician and LANY lead singer Paul Klein. Lipa dated American model Anwar Hadid, the younger brother of Bella and Gigi Hadid, from July 2019 to December 2021. In 2023, she dated French film director Romain Gavras.

Lipa entered a relationship with British actor Callum Turner in January 2024. She formally announced their engagement during her July 2025 cover story with British Vogue following a period of media rumours. The couple were married on 31 May 2026 in a civil ceremony at Marylebone Town Hall in London. A second wedding ceremony was held in the Sicilian comune of Bagheria on 6 June. It was the centerpiece of a three-day celebration in Palermo that reportedly cost £1.3 million. Residents were divided by the festivities; some were "proud" to host, while others criticised its disruption to their daily lives.

Lipa is occasionally affectionately referred to as 'Dula Peep' by fans, which originated as a mispronunciation by American talk show host Wendy Williams in 2018. Since then, she has positively embraced the nickname. Lipa has described herself as an "honorary Liverpool supporter", after her song "One Kiss" was adopted by the football club's fans in the wake of her performance at the 2018 UEFA Champions League final; although, she clarified that she remains an Arsenal supporter. Lipa was included in the Sunday Times Rich List for 2024 with an estimated net worth of £90 million.

On 27 November 2022, Lipa was granted Albanian citizenship by President Bajram Begaj, one day before the country's 110th independence celebrations. On 31 July 2025, Lipa was granted Kosovar citizenship by President Vjosa Osmani. She speaks Albanian fluently, and has described her "dual identity" as her "strength".

== Discography ==
- Dua Lipa (2017)
- Future Nostalgia (2020)
- Radical Optimism (2024)

== Filmography ==
=== Film ===
List of film appearances, with year released, title, role, and notes shown
Year	Title	Role	Notes	Ref.
2023	Barbie	Mermaid Barbie		
2024	Argylle	LaGrange		
TBA	Peaked †	TBA	Filming	

=== Television ===
List of television appearances, with year released, title, role, and notes shown
Year	Title	Role	Notes	Ref.
2016	The Bachelorette Australia	Herself	One episode (season two; live performance) (Note: Performed "Be the One" and "Hotter than Hell")	
2017	The Jonathan Ross Show	Herself	Musical guest; performed "New Rules"	
2017	Later... with Jools Holland	Herself	Musical guest; performed "New Rules" and "Homesick"	
2017	Sounds Like Friday Night	Herself	One episode; co-host and musical performer	
2018, 2020, 2024	Saturday Night Live	Herself	3 episodes (musical guest)	
2020	2020 American Music Awards	Herself	Musical performer; performed "Levitating"	
2021	63rd Annual Grammy Awards	Herself	Musical performer; performed "Levitating" and "Don't Start Now"	
2022	Elton John Live: Farewell from Dodger Stadium	Herself	Concert special; performed "Cold Heart" with Elton John	
2024	An Evening with Dua Lipa	Herself	Television special	
2024	The Graham Norton Show	Herself	Guest; series 31, episode 19	
2024	66th Annual Grammy Awards	Herself	Musical performer	
2024	Camden	Herself	Documentary series; contributor and executive producer	

=== Commercials ===
List of commercials, with year, campaign(s) or product(s), role, notes, and references shown
Year	Campaign(s) / product(s)	Brand(s)	Role	Ref.
2017	Lipa's Cremesheen Lipglass	MAC Cosmetics	Herself	
2018	Revlon's Live Boldly campaign	Revlon	Herself	
2018	SS18 Advertising Campaign	Patrizia Pepe	Herself	
2018	UEFA Champions League Final	Pepsi	Herself	
2018	Dua Lipa x Jaguar	Jaguar Cars	Herself	
2018	#HereToCreate campaign	Adidas	Herself	
2018	23-piece collection	Adidas	Herself	
2019	Libre's campaign	Yves Saint Laurent	Herself	
2019	AW19 collection	Pepe Jeans	Herself	
2021	"Drink True" campaign	Evian	Herself	
2021	"No One Is Just One Flavor" campaign	Truly Hard Seltzer	Herself	
2021	Versace Fall Winter 2021	Versace	Herself	
2021	Dua Lipa x Puma's Flutur Collection	Puma	Herself	
2022	Strawberry Melon Fizz, Orange Peach Fizz, Piña Colada Style and Kiwi Mojito Style	Truly Hard Seltzer	Herself	
2022	Dua Lipa x Puma Flutur Collection 2	Puma	Herself	
2022	Libre Le Parfum 2022 campaign	Yves Saint Laurent	Herself	
2024	Dua Lipa and Porsche	Porsche	Herself	
2025	"Make Me Blush Bold" campaign	Yves Saint Laurent	Herself	
2025	"Chanel 25 Handbag" campaign	Chanel	Herself	
2026	"Vertuo World" global campaign	Nespresso	Herself	

=== Video games ===
Nicolas Cage's television credits
Year	Title	Role	Ref.
2020–21	FIFA 21	Herself	

== Tours ==
Headlining

- The Self-Titled Tour (2017–2018)
- Future Nostalgia Tour (2022)
- Radical Optimism Tour (2024–2025)

Promotional

- 2016 UK Tour (2016)
- Hotter Than Hell Tour (2016)
- US and Europe Tour (2017)

Opening act

- Troye Sivan – Suburbia Tour (2016)
- Bruno Mars – 24K Magic World Tour (2017–2018)
- Coldplay – A Head Full of Dreams Tour (2017)

== See also ==
- Albanian diaspora – People of Albanian descent living outside Albania
- Disco revival – Return of disco popularity
- List of mezzo-sopranos in non-classical music
- List of most-followed Instagram accounts
- List of most-streamed artists on Spotify
- List of people from Pristina
- List of YouTubers

== Notes ==
Awards and achievements
Preceded by Mabel	Brit Award for British Female Solo Artist; 2021	Succeeded by
Preceded by John Legend	Mnet Asian Music Award for Best International Artist; 2019	Succeeded by
Preceded by Alessia Cara	Grammy Award for Best New Artist; 2019	Succeeded by Billie Eilish
Preceded by Emeli Sandé	Brit Award for British Female Solo Artist; 2018	Succeeded by Jorja Smith
Preceded by Rag'n'Bone Man	Brit Award for British Breakthrough Act; 2018	Succeeded by Tom Walker
