= Honorary Ambassador of Kosovo =

Honorary Ambassador of the Republic of Kosovo
- Awarded for: State decoration given to foreign nationals or citizens of Kosovo who have contributed to the national interest of Kosovo.
- Country: Kosovo
- Presented by: President of Kosovo

Honorary Ambassador of the Republic of Kosovo is the title given to foreign citizens and citizens originating from Kosovo, who have contributed to the national interest of Kosovo, and use their fame to help the recognition of the independence of Kosovo.

== List of Ambassadors ==
Name	Nationality	Ambassador since	Occupation
Franz Beckenbauer	Germany	4 March 2013	Football Player
Xherdan Shaqiri	Switzerland Kosovo	17 February 2014	Football Player
Valon Behrami	Switzerland Kosovo	17 February 2014	Football Player
Granit Xhaka	Switzerland Kosovo	17 February 2014	Football Player
Adnan Januzaj	Belgium Kosovo	17 February 2014	Football Player
Lorik Cana	Albania Kosovo	15 January 2015	Football Player
Rita Ora	Kosovo United Kingdom	13 July 2015	Musician
Majlinda Kelmendi	Kosovo	29 July 2016	Judoka
Otto Federico von Feigenblatt of Braemar, Baron of Braemar	United States Costa Rica	18 March 2018	Academic
Dua Lipa	United Kingdom Kosovo	5 August 2022	Musician
