= Miike Snow discography =

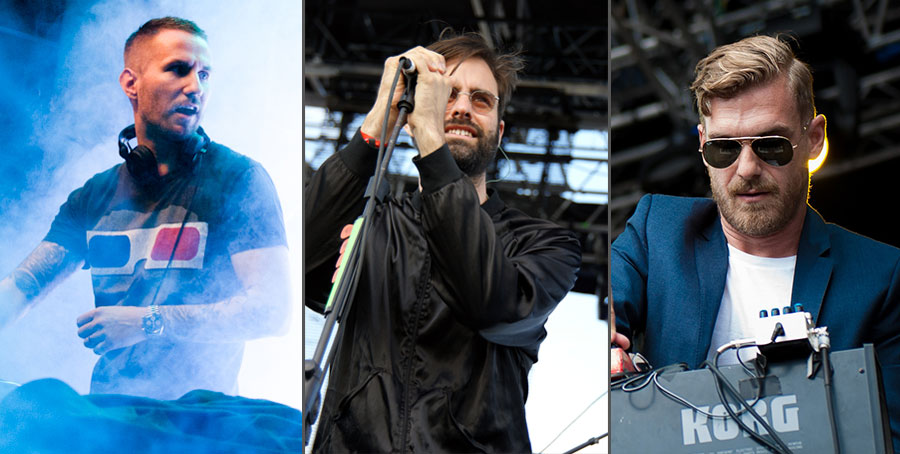
- Miike Snow's three members, Christian Karlsson, Andrew Wyatt and Pontus Winnberg
- Studio albums: 3
- Extended plays: 2
- Singles: 12
- Music videos: 15
- Remixes: 10

The discography of Swedish indie pop band Miike Snow consists of three studio albums, two extended plays (EPs), twelve singles (including one as a featured artist), fifteen music videos, and ten remixes for other artists. Formed in Stockholm in 2007, the band consists of Christian Karlsson and Pontus Winnberg of production duo Bloodshy & Avant and American vocalist Andrew Wyatt. The band began by sharing tracks and remixes on the free music website RCRD LBL that proved successful in the music blogosphere. The act preserved its anonymity by using a silhouetted jackalope avatar before revealing itself as a three-man band. The band released the debut studio album Miike Snow (2009) through Downtown Records to favorable reviews from music critics. The album spawned three commercial singles, two of which—"Animal" and "Black & Blue"—had moderate impact on charts in Belgium and the United Kingdom in 2009. The debut single "Animal" subsequently received a platinum certification in the United States.

Following a collaboration with Italian duo Crookers with the single "Remedy" (2010), Miike Snow completed its second studio album Happy to You (2012). While the band described the debut record as "a bunch of songs that ended up on an album", Happy to You was the result of the band being able to carefully map out the process. The album was released in March 2012 to positive reviews from critics. It peaked in the top 50 in Australia, Denmark, Sweden, the UK, and the US, while its lead single "Paddling Out" was a top-40 hit in the Netherlands.

Following months of touring throughout 2012, the band decided to take a break to work on individual projects. Wyatt released his first solo album Descender (2013), Karlsson formed DJ duo Galantis, and Winnberg released the album Sky City (2015) with his band Amason. The trio revisited the Miike Snow project in 2014, and released the single "Heart Is Full" the next year. The band's third studio album iii (2016) was met with a generally favorable reception, and reached the top 50 in Australia, Canada, Sweden, and the US. iii's second single "Genghis Khan" was a top-ten hit on the American Alternative Songs chart, and certified gold in Canada. In addition to three studio efforts, Miike Snow has also released two live EPs, iTunes Festival: London 2009 (2009) and Spotify Sessions (2016).

== Studio albums ==
List of studio albums, with selected details, chart positions and sales
Title	Album details	Peak chart positions										Sales
Title	Album details	SWE	AUS	BEL (Note: Indicates chart positions in Flanders, Belgium.)	CAN	DEN	NLD	SCO	SWI	UK	US	Sales
Miike Snow	Released: 22 May 2009 (US); Label: Downtown; Format: CD, digital download, LP, streaming	—	— (Note: Miike Snow did not enter the Australian ARIA Albums Chart but peaked at number 15 on the ARIA Hitseekers Chart.)	—	—	—	—	65	—	59	— (Note: Miike Snow did not enter the US Billboard 200, but peaked at number 15 on the US Heatseekers Albums chart.)	WW: 200,000; US: 95,000 (Note: Sales of Miike Snow in the United States as of January 2012.)
Happy to You	Released: 13 March 2012 (US); Label: Columbia, Downtown; Format: CD, digital download, LP, streaming	42	16	123	62	40	69	32	50	31	43	US: 42,000 (Note: Sales of Happy to You in the United States as of January 2016.)
III	Released: 4 March 2016 (US); Label: Atlantic, Downtown; Format: CD, digital download, LP, streaming	28	18	110	42	—	—	—	—	101	47	
"—" denotes a recording that did not chart.

== Extended plays ==
List of extended plays, with selected details
Title	EP details
iTunes Festival: London 2009	Released: 27 July 2009 (UK); Label: Sony Music; Format: Digital download, streaming
Spotify Sessions	Released: 27 May 2016 (Worldwide); Label: Jackalope; Format: Streaming

== Singles ==
=== As lead artist ===
List of singles, with selected chart positions and certifications, showing year released and album name
Title	Year	Peak chart positions										Certifications	Album
Title	Year	SWE	AUS	BEL	CAN	FRA	NLD	SCO	SWI	UK	US Rock	Certifications	Album
"Animal"	2009	—	—	—	—	—	—	50	80	98	—	BPI: Silver; RIAA: Platinum	Miike Snow
"Black & Blue"	2009	—	—	— (Note: "Black & Blue" did not enter the Ultratop 50, but peaked at number ten on the Ultratip 100.)	—	—	—	58	—	64	—		Miike Snow
"Silvia"	2010	—	—	—	—	—	—	—	—	154	—		Miike Snow
"Paddling Out"	2012	—	— (Note: "Paddling Out" did not enter the Australian ARIA Singles Chart but peaked at number 12 on the ARIA Hitseekers Chart.)	— (Note: "Paddling Out" did not enter the Ultratop 50, but peaked at number nine on the Ultratip 100.)	—	—	32	99	—	90	—		Happy to You
"The Wave"	2012	—	—	— (Note: "The Wave" did not enter the Ultratop 50, but peaked at number 43 on the Ultratip 100.)	—	—	— (Note: "The Wave" did not enter the Dutch Top 40, but peaked at number 21 on the Tipparade chart.)	—	—	—	—		Happy to You
"Pretender"	2012	—	—	—	—	—	—	—	—	—	—		Happy to You
"Heart Is Full"	2015	—	— (Note: "Heart Is Full" did not enter the Australian ARIA Singles Chart but peaked at number eight on the ARIA Hitseekers Chart.)	—	—	194	—	—	—	—	41		iii
"Genghis Khan"	2015	— (Note: "Genghis Khan" did not enter the Sverigetopplistan Top 100 Singles chart, but peaked at number 8 on the Sverigetopplistan Heatseeker chart.)	44	— (Note: "Genghis Khan" did not enter the Ultratop 50, but appeared as an "extra tip" below the Ultratip 100.)	86	—	—	—	—	—	12	MC: Gold; RIAA: Platinum	iii
"My Trigger"	2016	—	—	—	—	—	—	—	—	—	— (Note: "My Trigger" did not enter the Hot Rock & Alternative Songs chart, but peaked at number 37 on the Alternative Airplay chart.)		iii
"The Heart of Me"	2016	—	—	—	—	—	—	—	—	—	—		iii
"I Was a Sailor"	2024	—	—	—	—	—	—	—	—	—	—		Non-album single
"—" denotes a recording that did not chart.

=== Promotional singles ===
List of promotional singles, with selected chart positions, showing year issued and album name
Title	Year	Peak chart positions	Album
Title	Year	SWI	Album
"Burial/Animal"	2009	—	Miike Snow
"The Rabbit"	2010	95	Miike Snow
"Devil's Work"	2011	—	Happy to You
"Black Tin Box" (featuring Lykke Li)	2012	—	Happy to You
"I Feel the Weight"	2016	—	iii
"—" denotes a recording that did not chart.

=== As featured artist ===
List of singles as featured artist, with selected chart positions, showing year issued and album name
Title	Year	Peak chart positions	Album
Title	Year	BEL	Album
"Remedy" (Crookers featuring Miike Snow)	2010	— (Note: "Remedy" did not enter the Ultratop 50, but peaked at number ten on the Ultratip 100.)	Tons of Friends
"—" denotes a recording that did not chart.

== Guest appearances ==
List of guest appearances, solo or with other performing artists, showing year released and album name
Title	Year	Other performer(s)	Album	Ref.
"Remedy"	2010	Crookers	Tons of Friends	
"Catman"	2016	Yoko Ono	Yes, I'm a Witch Too	
"Change Your Mind"	2018	—N/a	Fifty Shades Freed OST	

== Remixes ==
List of remixes by Miike Snow for other artists, showing year released
Title	Year	Artist	Ref.
"The Kids Don't Stand a Chance" (Vampire Weekend vs. Miike Snow)	2009	Vampire Weekend	
"It Don't Move Me" (PBJ vs. Miike Snow)	2009	Peter Bjorn and John	
"The Reeling" (Miike Snow remix)	2009	Passion Pit	
"Caesar" (Miike Snow remix)	2010	I Blame Coco featuring Robyn	
"Sabali" (Miike Snow remix)	2010	Amadou & Mariam	
"Breakin' Point" (Miike Snow remix)	2016	Peter Bjorn and John	
"Hotter than Hell" (Miike Snow remix)	2016	Dua Lipa	
"Another Dimension" (Miike Snow remix)	2017	MishCatt	
"Cringe" (Miike Snow remix)	2017	Matt Maeson	
"I Know a Place" (Miike Snow remix)	2017	Muna	

== Music videos ==
List of music videos, showing year released and directors
Title	Year	Director(s)	Ref.
"Animal"	2009	Sebastian Mlynarski	
"Burial"	2009	Daniel Wirtberg; Jonas Rudström	
"Animal"	2009	Anthony Dickenson	
"Black & Blue"	2009	Vincent Haycock	
"Silvia"	2009	Marcus Söderlund	
"Remedy" (Crookers featuring Miike Snow)	2010	Paul Kamuf	
"The Rabbit"	2010	Andreas Nilsson	
"Devil's Work"	2011	Andreas Nilsson	
"Paddling Out"	2012	Andreas Nilsson	
"The Wave"	2012	Andreas Nilsson	
"Pretender"	2012	Vern Moen	
"Heart Is Full"	2015	Lance Drake	
"Genghis Khan"	2016	Ninian Doff	
"Catman" (Yoko Ono featuring Miike Snow)	2016	Rose McGowan	
"My Trigger"	2016	Ninian Doff	
