= 2016 UK Music Video Awards =

Awards show

- Date: 20 October 2016
- Location: Roundhouse, London, United Kingdom
- Hosted by: Adam Buxton
- Website: www.ukmva.com

The 2016 UK Music Video Awards were held on 20 October 2016 to recognise the best in music videos from United Kingdom and worldwide. The nominations were announced on 21 September 2016. English musician Jamie XX won Video of the Year with "Gosh", directed by Romain Gavras, Vaughan Arnell received the Icon Award. Below are the list of nominations, the winners are highlighted in bold.

== Video of the Year ==
Video of the Year

**Jamie XX – "Gosh"**
(Director: Romain Gavras)

== Special awards ==
Outstanding Achievement Award	Icon Award
**Mike O'Keefe**	**Vaughan Arnell**

== Video genre categories ==
Best Pop Video – UK	Best Pop Video – International
**Michael Kiwanuka – "Black Man in a White World"** (Director: Hiro Murai): Adele – "Hello"; Hurts – "Lights"; JONES – "Melt"; Laura Mvula ft. Nile Rodgers – "Overcome"; The 1975 – "A Change of Heart"	**Miike Snow – "Genghis Khan"** (Director: Ninian Doff): Christine and The Queens – "Tilted"; Miike Snow – "My Trigger"; MØ – "Kamikaze"; OK Go – "Upside Down & Inside Out"; The Avalanches – "Frankie Sinatra"
Best Dance Video – UK	Best Dance Video – International
**The Chemical Brothers ft. Beck – "Wide Open"** (Directors: Dom & Nic): 99 Souls ft. Destiny's Child & Brandy – "The Girl Is Mine"; Calvin Harris ft. Rihanna – "This Is What You Came For"; Delta Heavy – "White Flag"; Disclosure ft. Lorde – "Magnets"; SG Lewis ft. Gallant – "Holding Back"	**Valentino Khan – "Deep Down Low"** (Director: Ian Pons Jewell): Baauer – "GoGo!"; Breakbot – "My Toy"; GTA ft. Sam Bruno – "Red Lips" (Skrillex remix); Kaytranada – "Lite Spots"; Major Lazer ft. Nyla & Fuse ODG - "Light It Up (Remix)"
Best Rock/Indie Video – UK	Best Rock/Indie Video – International
**Coldplay – "Up&Up"** (Directors: Vania Heymann & Gal Muggia): Bring Me the Horizon – "True Friends"; David Bowie – "Blackstar"; David Bowie – "Lazarus"; PJ Harvey – "The Community of Hope"; The Kills – "Doing It To Death"	**Tame Impala – "The Less I Know The Better"** (Directors: CANADA): De Staat – "Witch Doctor"; Hinds – "Warts"; Radkey – "Glore"; The Dead Weather – "I Feel Love"; Wintersleep – "Amerika"
Best Alternative Video – UK	Best Alternative Video – International
**Jamie xx – "Gosh"** (Director: Romain Gavras): Massive Attack ft. Young Fathers – "Voodoo In My Blood"; Metronomy – "Old Skool"; Radiohead – "Burn The Witch"; Radiohead – "Daydreaming"; Stealing Sheep – "Apparition"	**The Blaze – "Virile"** (Directors: Jonathan Alric & Guillaume Alric): John Grant – "Down Here"; Klyne – "Don't Stop"; The Shoes ft. Blaine Harrison – "Submarine"; The Shoes ft. Dominic Lord – "1960's Horror"; Yeasayer – "I Am Chemistry"
Best Urban Video – UK	Best Urban Video – International
**Nao – "Bad Blood"** (Director: Ian Pons Jewell): Dusky ft. Wiley – "Sort It Out Sharon"; Kano – "This Is England"; Rejjie Snow – "Blakkst Skn"; Roots Manuva – "Crying"; Spyro ft. Big H, Bossman Birdie & President T – "Side By Side"	**Run The Jewels ft. Gangsta Boo – "Love Again"** (Director: Ninian Doff): Beyoncé – "Formation"; DJ Shadow ft. Run The Jewels – "Nobody Speak"; KCPK – "Who Wants It?"; Leon Bridges – "River"; Mykki Blanco ft. Woodkid – "High School Never Ends"
Best Pop Video – Newcomer	Best Dance Video – Newcomer
**Will Joseph Cook – "Take Me Dancing"** (Director: Rafe Jennings): Casi – "Lion"; Connie Constance – "Lose My Mind"; Kloe – "Touch"; MS MR – "Wrong Victory"; Skylar Spence – "I Can't Be Your Superman"	**Beardyman – "Mountainside"** (Director: Lewis Rose): Antony & Cleopatra - "Love Is A Lonely Dancer"; Gabriels – "Amethyst"; Lone – "Backtail Was Heavy"; Mura Masa – "What If I Go?"; Vessels – "Are You Trending?"
Best Rock/Indie Video – Newcomer	Best Alternative Video – Newcomer
**Honeyblood – "Ready For Magic"** (Director: Thomas James): Captains – "Heavy Metal Works"; Girl Band – "In Plastic"; Small Black – "Boy's Life"; Tim Aminov ft. Pete Josef – "One Lone Survivor"; Vant – "Fly-By Alien"	**Holy Fuck – "Tom Tom"** (Director: Michael Leblanc): FOXTROTT – "Shaky Hands"; Jono McCleery – "This Idea of Us"; Lil Silva ft. Kent Jamz – "De Ja"; Sheep, Dog & Wolf – "Breathe"; The Shoes – "Drifted"
Best Urban Video – Newcomer
**Jesse James Solomon – "YPT"** (Director: Noah Lee): A. Chal – "Round Whippin'"; Dead Players – "Drenching"; Ichon – "Fils de Pute"; LarzRanda – "Lifeguard"; Ray BLK – "5050"

== Craft and technical categories ==
Best Production Design in a Video	Best Styling in a Video
**David Bowie – "Blackstar"** (Production Designer: Jan Houllevigue): Fergie – "M.I.L.F. $"; Miike Snow – "Genghis Khan"; Radiohead – "Burn The Witch"; Tame Impala – "The Less I Know The Better"; The Avalanches – "Frankie Sinatra"	**Beyoncé – "Formation"** (Stylist: Marni Senofonte): Hurts – "Lights"; Jamie xx – "Gosh"; Metronomy – "Old Skool"; Mykki Blanco ft. Woodkid – "High School Never Ends"; Tame Impala – "The Less I Know The Better"
Best Choreography in a Video	Best Cinematography in a Video
**Florence + The Machine – "Delilah"** (Choreographer: Holly Blakey): Christine and the Queens – "Tilted"; Massive Attack ft. Young Fathers – "Voodoo in My Blood"; OK Go – "Upside Down & Inside Out"; Paul McCartney & Michael Jackson – "Say Say Say"; Unknown Mortal Orchestra – "First World Problem"	**Miike Snow – "Genghis Khan"** (DOP: Patrick Meller): Holy Fuck – "Tom Tom"; Hurts – "Lights"; Jamie xx – "Gosh"; Nao – "Bad Blood"; Tame Impala – "The Less I Know The Better"
Best Color Grading in a Video	Best Editing in a Video
**Jamie xx – "Gosh"** (Colourist: Mathieu Caplanne at Nightshift): Miike Snow – "Genghis Khan"; Tom Odell – "Magnetised"; Izzy Bizu – "Give Me Love"; Vince Staples – "Lift Me Up"; Wild Beasts – "Get My Bang"	**Run The Jewels ft. Gangsta Boo – "Love Again"** (Editor: Paul O'Reilly at Stitch): Hurts – "Lights"; Leon Bridges – "River"; Massive Attack ft. Young Fathers – "Voodoo In My Blood"; Seafret – "Wildfire"; The Shoes ft. Dominic Lord – "1960's Horror"
Best Visual Effects in a Video	Best Animation in a Video
**The Chemical Brothers ft. Beck – "Wide Open"** (VFX Artist: The Mill London): Baauer – "GoGo!"; Cassius – "The Missing"; Coldplay – "Up&Up"; Massive Attack ft. Young Fathers – "Voodoo In My Blood"; The Shoes ft. Blaine Harrison – "Submarine"	**De Staat – "Witch Doctor"** (Animators: Floris Kaayk & Studio Smack): Mr Oizo ft. Charli XCX – "Hand In The Fire"; Radiohead – "Burn The Witch"; Radkey – "Glore"; The Chemical Brothers ft. Beck – "Wide Open"; Yeasayer – "I Am Chemistry"

== Live and interactive categories ==
Best Interactive Video	Best Live Coverage
**Naïve New Beaters ft. Izia – "Heal Tomorrow"** (Director: Romain Chassaing): Cassius – "The Missing"; Mind Enterprises – "Chapita"; Netsky – "Work It Out"; Polar Youth – "Searching/The Future of Music"; Reeps One – "Does Not Exist"	**Iggy Pop: Post Pop Depression Live At The Royal Albert Hall** (Director: Nick Wickham): Catfish and the Bottlemen – Live at the Brighton Dome; Ed Sheeran – Jumpers for Goalposts: Live at Wembley Stadium; Imagine Dragons: Smoke & Mirrors Live; Rudimental Live Acoustic Session; The Rolling Stones: Havana Moon
Best Music Documentary
**Breaking A Monster** (Director: Luke Meyer): Blur: New World Towers; Classic Albums: The Beach Boys - Pet Sounds; Goodnight Brooklyn - The Story of Death By Audio; Janis: Little Girl Blue; Orion: The Man Who Would Be King

== Individual and company categories ==
Best Video Artist	Best Commissioner
**Massive Attack**: Beyoncé; Christine and The Queens; Miike Snow; Radiohead; Years & Years	**Phil Lee (XL Recordings)**: Elizabeth Doonan; Emily Tedrake; James Hackett; Jane Third; Sam Seager
Best Director	Best New Director
**Ninian Doff**: CANADA; Hiro Murai; Ian Pons Jewell; Sam Pilling; Vincent Haycock	**Oscar Hudson**: Holly Blakey; John Merizalde; Pedro Martin-Calero; Thunderlips; Youth Hymns
Best Producer
**Roman Pichon Herrera**: Dobi Manolova; Nathan Scherrer; Rachel Rumbold; Sarah Boardman & Rik Green; Tom Birmingham
