= My Trigger =

Song performed by Swedish indie pop band Miike Snow from their third studio album

Single by Miike Snow

from the album iii
- Released: 9 September 2016
- Genre: Electropop; indie pop
- Length: 3:12
- Label: Jackalope; Atlantic
- Songwriters: Christian Karlsson; Pontus Winnberg; Andrew Wyatt; James Yancey; Dennis Thomas; George Brown; Robert Mickens; Robert "Kool" Bell; Ronald Bell; Robert Westfield; Claydes Charles Smith
- Producer: Miike Snow

Miike Snow singles chronology
"Genghis Khan" (2015)	"My Trigger" (2016)	"The Heart of Me" (2016)

"My Trigger" is a song performed by Swedish indie pop band Miike Snow from their third studio album, iii (2016). Written and produced by the band, the song contains elements from J Dilla's "The Diff'rence" (2006), which samples "Fruitman" (1974) by Kool & the Gang. The writers of both compositions obtained writing credit. "My Trigger" is an electropop and indie pop song, the lyrics of which speak of spending a weekend with a stripper. Lead singer Andrew Wyatt also revealed that it comments on the sex industry in the United States. The song was released on 9 September 2016, through Jackalope and Atlantic as the third single from iii.

Critical response to "My Trigger" was generally positive; the majority of critics applauded its pop sound and production, although some felt it lacked depth. The single became the band's second entry on the American Alternative Songs chart, peaking at number 37. The accompanying music video was directed by Ninian Doff and depicts a dramatization of the 1962 Cuban Missile Crisis where John F. Kennedy and Nikita Khrushchev express doubts about pushing a button to start a nuclear war. The video received positive reviews as critics praised its choreography and entertainment value.

== Background ==
"My Trigger" was written by Miike Snow's three members, Christian Karlsson, Pontus Winnberg and Andrew Wyatt, for the band's third studio album, iii (2016). The instrumental is based on J Dilla's track "The Diff'rence" from his album Donuts (2006), which samples "Fruitman" by Kool & the Gang from their album Light of Worlds (1974). The stems from J Dilla's albums Donuts and The Shining (2006) were made available for use while Miike Snow were working on iii. Karlsson presented the instrumentals to the rest of the band and they found one that was "so inspirational". As the original instrumental is "chopped" and incoherent, Wyatt learned the piano chord progression to complete a continuous pattern that the source material lacked. He noted that the band's own version is somewhat different from the original because of this.

Wyatt explained to Rolling Stone that they experimented with many different samples on iii, stating that they are "all pop songwriters" and they try to conceptualize songs from "as weird of a place" as possible. He added, "Our formula has been take what's great about pop songwriting and leave what's not great about some pop songwriting and present that with as complex an array of instrumental aspects we can add on the production side." Winnberg elaborated to HuffPost on the topic of sampling, "For us, to do a song based on a J Dilla beat is, of course, a huge tribute to J Dilla, and we wish that he could be alive and hear it. And maybe even like it. It's not about taking something and running with it to build on your own success." In an interview for Spin, Wyatt deemed "My Trigger" the album's "best combination of song and track", elaborating on the difference of the two terms, "I think a 'song' is, like, just play it on the guitar and sing it. You look out and see thousands of covers of 'Animal' for example ... There are other tracks that are more reliant upon the beat."

== Composition and lyrics ==
"If you think about how much this dark, misogynistic pornography is out in American culture, it has so much to do with the whole aspect of feeling a repression about it. So the sex thing has to take on this dark meanness or something, you know?"

— Wyatt regarding the song's meaning

Musically, "My Trigger" is an electropop and indie pop song with a hip hop groove and influences of "old-school Motown". Instrumentation is provided by bass guitar, organ, piano and timpani. Wyatt uses a falsetto vocal style throughout the song. It includes a section with electronically manipulated vocals, which "sounds like a squirrel is ... having a seizure", according to Michael Pementel of PopMatters. Wyatt told musicOMH that "My Trigger" has an almost identical sound to a composition from his unreleased 1993 solo album. He also said it recalls the music he made with Greg Kurstin in the 1990s, while in a band called Funkraphiliacs.

The lyrics of "My Trigger" came about when Karlsson came up with the line "I saw you licking a dollar bill". Wyatt then went with the idea and wrote about a "lost weekend with a stripper". He previously dated a stripper, which inspired the single "Silvia" from the band's debut album Miike Snow (2009), but he told Notion that the narration of "My Trigger" is "totally fictional". He stated that the song is meant to convey a deeper meaning about the sex industry in the United States, "You can say some things that feel kind of truthful, or that are a little bit more controversial, inside of a song that's about something very simplistic." He commented that the lyrical interpretation is up to the listener, stating that the public "can dive in and maybe get something to think about in the lyrics" or just enjoy the beat. Critic Dave Simpson of The Guardian deemed the phrase "Pull my trigger" to be "laden with innuendo", while Paul Carr of PopMatters wrote that it contains "the most unsubtle innuendo since Robert Plant asked to squeeze his lemon".

== Release and reception ==
Miike Snow launched a remix competition in collaboration with Earmilk and Wavo on 23 August 2016, where participants submitted self-produced remixes of "My Trigger". The winner received synths by Teenage Engineering and shoutouts on the band's social media. "My Trigger" was released through Jackalope Recordings and Atlantic Records as the third single from iii. A digital EP containing five remixes was made available on 9 September 2016. The single debuted and peaked at number 37 on the American Alternative Songs chart. It spent four weeks on the chart in total, and became the band's second entry there following "Genghis Khan".

"My Trigger" was met with generally positive reviews from critics. Eight different writers reviewed and rated the song on behalf of PopMatters as part of the magazine's "Singles Going Steady" series. The song averaged 7.13 out of 10, with individual scores ranging from 4 to 10. Adriane Pontecorvo deemed it "the perfect pop song", and Scott Zuppardo described it as "hell of a jam". Chris Ingalls called it "catchy, fun, and unique", commenting that the single "incorporates lovely effects and production that seem somewhat experimental but still have a lovely pop sheen". William Sutton described it as a "fun slice of light hearted pop" and wrote, "The electronically manipulated vocals can be slightly grating at times but this is still a good track." Sputnikmusic's staff reviewer Rudy K. perceived "My Trigger" as a "genuinely great addition" to the band's catalog and commended its position as the opening track of iii. Ben Hogwood of musicOMH viewed it as "almost as good" as "Genghis Khan" and felt the J Dilla sample is "screwed up brilliantly".

Kat Bein of Billboard called the song "captivating" and argued it "could use a little kick" if it were to be played in dance clubs, praising the Higher Self remix included on the digital release, "This remix is all the things we love about 'My Trigger' with a hefty injection of kick drum and synthetic flourishes." DIY critic David Beech felt "My Trigger", along with two other album tracks, "possess a pop pomp that's been hinted at only slightly in the past". He concluded, "Though there's a definite confidence in their composition, they certainly feel less organic, more contrived than before." Spin's Rachel Brodsky was critical in her review, stating that the song "lives in the upper register but ends up suggesting the unappealing prospect of Gnarls Barkley cutting an ELO record". Writing for PopMatters, Andrew Paschal felt it lacked "sonic depth", asserting, "While catchy, the song comes across as a factory-produced collection of hooks arbitrarily pasted together with no overarching concept or emotional nuance to guide it."

== Music video ==
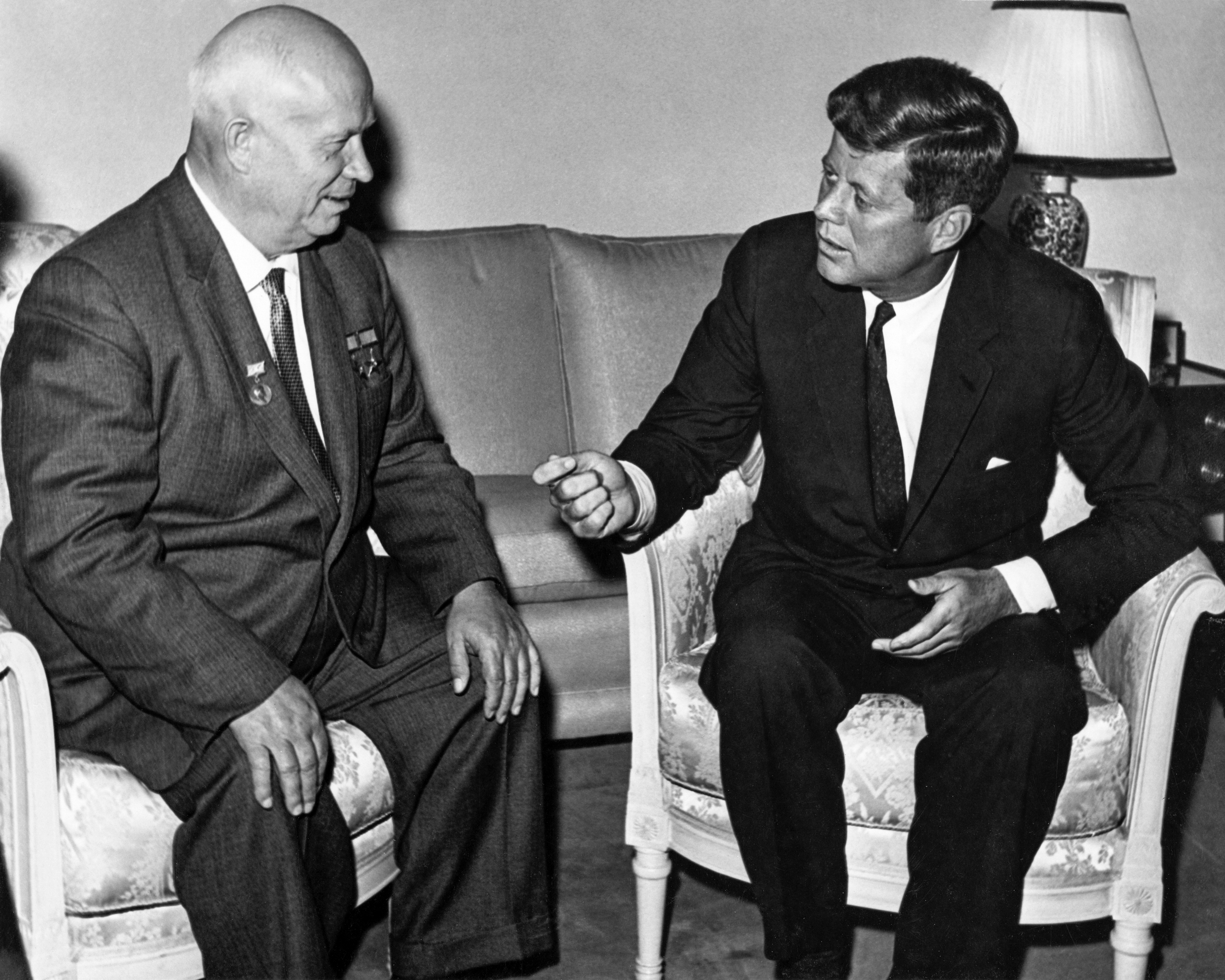
The video portrays Nikita Khrushchev (left) and John F. Kennedy (right).

Ninian Doff directed the accompanying music video for "My Trigger". Doff also directed the visual for iii's previous single "Genghis Khan", starring actors Edward Hayes Neary and Adam Jones. The two actors returned for the "My Trigger" video, this time portraying American President John F. Kennedy (Hayes Neary) and Soviet leader Nikita Khrushchev (Jones) in a dramatization of the 1962 Cuban Missile Crisis. Doff described the visual as "an apparently very serious political drama about the Cuban Missile Crisis which starts spiraling into a sort of hallucinatory musical". Patrick Meller provided the video's cinematography and Supple Nam created the choreography. It was produced by Pulse Films, with Russ Hallard as editor, Rik Green as producer and Tim Gibson as production designer.

The video begins in the White House, where President Kennedy is pressured by his cabinet to hit a red "launch nukes" button. Kennedy is anxious of the decision, and the scenery cuts to his fantasy where Marilyn Monroe (Fran Dearlove) dances seductively atop an oversized red button, tempting him to push it. Meanwhile, in the Kremlin, Soviet leader Krushchev is faced with the same decision as his cabinet presents a red button. The two leaders break out in a choreographed dance number before they decide to call each other. Deciding not to push the button, they then return to their respective cabinets, where white doves emerge from their mouths and clothing as they enter the room.

The video premiered on 22 August 2016 on Miike Snow's YouTube channel. Commentators had positive remarks regarding the video. Gabriel Aikins of Substream Magazine wrote that Miike Snow continues the trend of releasing "great videos" and concluded, "The video is a bizarre and delightful mix of historical drama and stage musical". Pementel of PopMatters called the video "hilarious" and applauded its choreography. Bein, writing for Billboard, characterized it as a "beautifully-entertaining video". The video received a UK Music Video Award nomination for Best Pop Video (International). The band's video for "Genghis Khan" ultimately took home the prize.

== Track listing ==
- Digital EP – Remixes
1. "My Trigger" (Olin Batista remix) – 4:11
2. "My Trigger" (Higher Self remix) – 3:43
3. "My Trigger" (Imad Royal remix) – 2:59
4. "My Trigger" (Klyne remix) – 3:09
5. "My Trigger" (Indiginis remix) – 3:57

== Credits and personnel ==
Credits are adapted from the iii liner notes.

- Songwriting – Christian Karlsson, Pontus Winnberg, Andrew Wyatt, James Yancey, Dennis Thomas, George Brown, Robert Mickens, Robert "Kool" Bell, Ronald Bell, Robert Westfield, Claydes Charles Smith
- Production – Miike Snow
- Vocals – Andrew Wyatt
- Bass – Pontus Winnberg
- Keyboard – Pontus Winnberg, Andrew Wyatt
- Piano – Andrew Wyatt
- Engineering – Johannes Raassina
- Mixing – Niklas Flyckt, Miike Snow
- Mastering – Tom Coyne, Randy Merrill

== Charts ==
Chart (2016)	Peak position
US Alternative Airplay (Billboard)	37

== Release history ==
Country	Date	Format	Label	Ref.
Various	9 September 2016	Digital download	Jackalope; Atlantic	
