= Kiss of Death (2008 film) =

- Also known as: Blood Rush; Breathless
- Created by: Barbara Machin
- Written by: Barbara Machin
- Directed by: Paul Unwin
- Starring: Louise Lombard; Lyndsey Marshal; Danny Dyer; Shaun Parkes; Lenora Crichlow; Ace Bhatti; Brian McCardie; Caroline O'Hara; Neil McDermott; Perry Benson
- Country of origin: United Kingdom
- No. of seasons: 1
- No. of episodes: 1

Production
- Executive producer: Patrick Spence
- Producer: Jane Steventon
- Running time: 90 minutes
- Production company: BBC Northern Ireland

Original release
- Network: BBC One
- Release: 26 May 2008

Kiss of Death, previously titled Breathless and Blood Rush, is a British crime investigation television film, written by Barbara Machin, author of the British television crime drama series Waking the Dead, that aired on BBC on 26 May 2008.

The one-off drama, intended as a backdoor pilot for a possible series, was originally written as a two-part series but was re-written several times at the request of BBC executives. The original running time of 120 minutes was also shortened to 90, and the programme was finally broadcast in one instalment in May 2008. The drama was produced by BBC Northern Ireland and shot in Bristol. A DVD was released in Sweden in 2010, but as of 2016, has not been released in the UK. Viewing figures of 3.9 million did not prove strong enough for a full series to be commissioned.

== Synopsis ==
A plot synopsis issued by the BBC in a press release read as follows: "In this drama, a killer has killed once and kidnapped another victim, challenging the investigative and forensic team to work out why. Suddenly everyone's past comes under scrutiny, everyone's version of the truth comes under suspicion. Kay Rousseau (Louise Lombard), who heads up the crime team, is back at work after the death of her child. Suspicion about her involvement in this death remains, not least in her own husband. Only Matt Costello (Danny Dyer), Kay's second-in-command and a dedicated, impassioned copper, is loyal to the core. Dr. George Austen (Lyndsey Marshal), the team's forensic scientist, worked on Kay's case and knows things Kay wished she didn't, and this isn't helped by her own fast increasing addiction to alcohol which puts her evidential work under unwelcome scrutiny.

Dr Clive Morrell (Shaun Parkes) is a profiler whose own mood swings and strange behaviour are causing concern within the team. Jude Whiley (Lenora Crichlow) is a rookie cop, who is young, fresh and has an energy and passion for the job that verges on obsession. Miles Trumeman (Ace Bhatti) plays Kay's husband Miles Trueman, who is a lawyer attached to the case. Brian McCardie plays killer Michael Bovery, a man obsessed with one of the team, and Jeffery Kissoon plays Commissioner Wilson, Rousseau's boss."

== Cast ==
- Louise Lombard as Superintendent Kay Rousseau
- Danny Dyer as Detective Inspector Matt Costello
- Lenora Crichlow as Detective Constable Jude Whiley
- Lyndsey Marshal as Dr. George Austen, pathologist
- Shaun Parkes as Dr. Clive Morrell, profiler
- Ace Bhatti as Miles Trueman, lawyer
- Caroline O'Hara as Jane, kidnap and rape victim
- Neil McDermott as John, kidnap victim
- Perry Benson as The Courier
- Brian McCardie as Michael Bovery
- Jeffery Kissoon as Commissioner Wilson
