= The Heart of Me (song) =

2016 song by Swedish indie pop band Miike Snow

- Cover art for The Him remix

Single by Miike Snow

from the album iii
- Released: 15 November 2016
- Genre: Chillwave
- Length: 3:59
- Label: Jackalope; Atlantic
- Songwriters: Christian Karlsson; Pontus Winnberg; Andrew Wyatt
- Producer: Miike Snow

Miike Snow singles chronology
| "My Trigger" (2016) | "The Heart of Me" (2016) |

"The Heart of Me" is a song by Swedish indie pop band Miike Snow from their third studio album, iii (2016). Written and produced by the band, the song was initially issued as a buzz single on 19 February 2016, in anticipation of the album's release. Subsequently, Atlantic Records sent it to alternative radio in the United States on 15 November 2016, as the fourth and final single off the album. Musically, "The Heart of Me" is a synth-laden chillwave song with indie rock elements and emotional lyrics. It features background vocals by English singer Charli XCX.

"The Heart of Me" received generally positive reviews from music critics, some of whom complimented its upbeat production. The single became Miike Snow's first to lack an accompanying music video. The song is included on the soundtrack for the racing video game Forza Horizon 3 (2016). In March 2017, a deep house remix of the track by Dutch DJ duo The Him was released digitally.

== Background ==
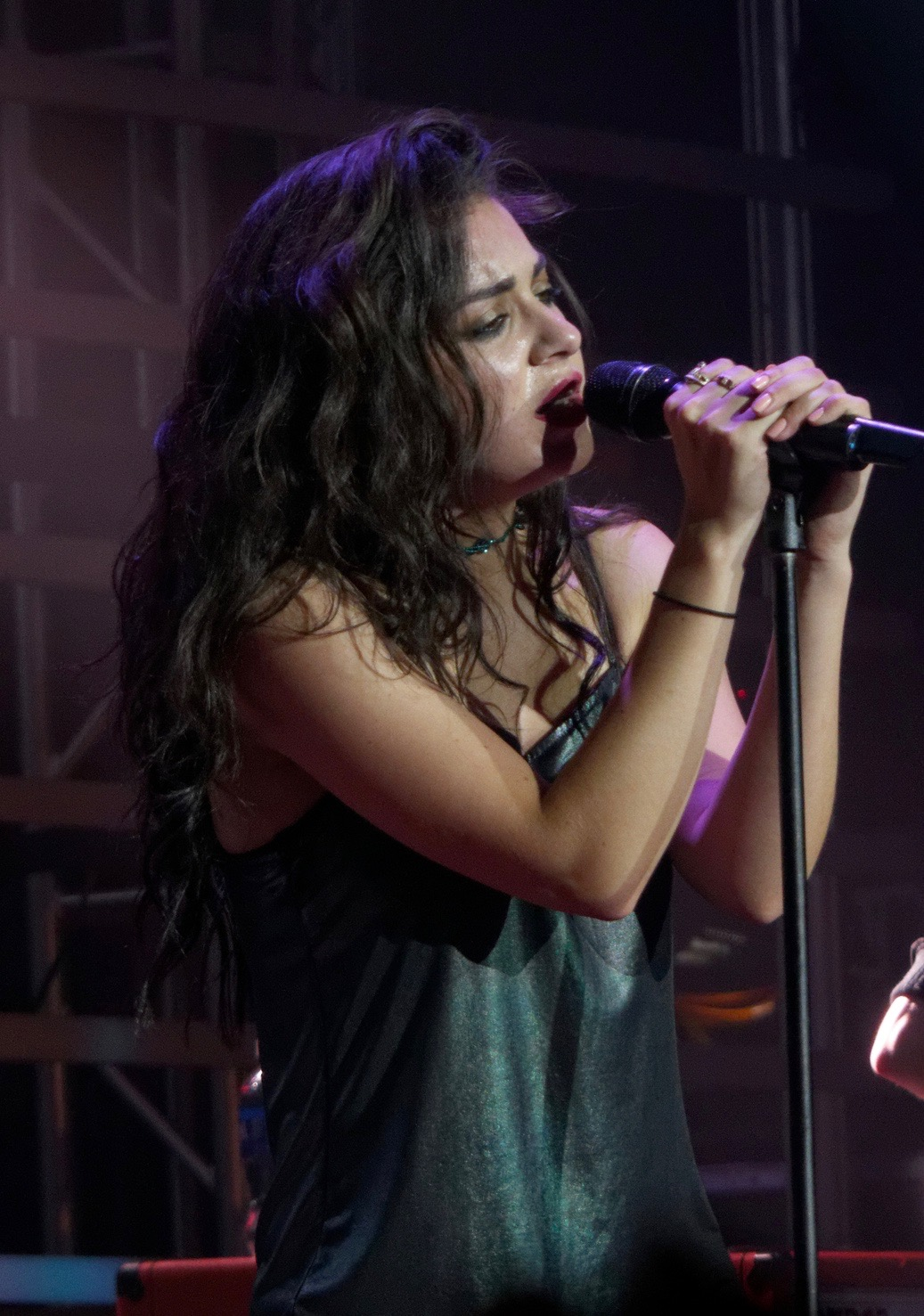
Charli XCX provided background vocals on the song.

"The Heart of Me" was written by Miike Snow's three members, Christian Karlsson, Pontus Winnberg and Andrew Wyatt, for the band's third studio album, iii (2016). Wyatt conceptualized the melody of the song's intro while walking over a bridge in Australia. The recording sessions for the album took place in different studios in California, New York, and Sweden, from 2014 to 2015. In an interview for the Los Angeles Times, Wyatt said he adapted his singing based on the needs of each song throughout the album. He had previously aimed to present a "consistent character" during concerts, which resulted in the band's second studio album Happy to You (2012) holding a "more uniform sound". For iii, Wyatt switched focus to his performance in the studio rather than on stage, which resulted in a "lighter, airier quality" to his voice on "The Heart of Me". He said he learned a lot about how he wanted to sing and "how the softer you sing the bigger it sounds".

English singer Charli XCX, who contributed guest vocals on the album track "For U", provided background vocals on the song alongside Winnberg and Wyatt. The two previously worked with the singer on her album Sucker (2014), for which Wyatt sang background vocals on two tracks. "The Heart of Me" and other album tracks include sections of computerized vocals. Karlsson explained in an interview for Electronic Musician that "I never like any vocal when it just sounds like a normal vocal. Ever. Sometimes I feel like I spend 50 percent of my time on the treatment of the vocals and 50 percent of the time I spend on the rest of the song." The live instruments in "The Heart of Me" were played by Winnberg, Wyatt, and Homer Steinweiss. The band handled its production, engineering with S. Vaughan Merrick, and mixing with Niklas Flyckt. Digital mastering was performed by Kevin Grainger.

== Composition and lyrics ==
"The Heart of Me"
A sample of "The Heart of Me", showcasing its chorus followed by the manipulated vocal hook. Critics noted Wyatt's "emotionally-charged" vocals.

Musically, "The Heart of Me" is a chillwave song with indie rock elements. Its instrumentation is primarily provided by drums, a piano, and a synthesizer. The song begins with a manipulated vocal hook. Music critics likened the song to works by American bands MGMT, Passion Pit, and Spoon. Earmilk writer Steph Evans characterized it as "upbeat" and rock and roll-infused, while Neil Z. Young of AllMusic defined it as "peppered with fuzzy synths". According to James Grebey of Spin, the production displays a "cool aloofness" that is "betrayed, sublimely, by the more emotional vocals". Similarly, Dancing Astronaut writer Alex Hitchcock observed the contrast between the "high-spirited, synth-filled melody" and the "brooding, emotionally-charged vocals". In the bridge, he sings about "standing in a cathedral in Europe and feeling at one with the universe", as interpreted by Spectrum Culture writer Josh Goller. The writer noted the song's theme of love, sentimentalism, and relationship melodrama. musicOMH's Ben Hogwood perceived the lyrics as commentary on fame and "the trappings of it"; the writer singled out the first verse's line "I can't stop this hurtful shit from happening" as alluding to fame having personal consequences.

== Release ==
"The Heart of Me" premiered on 18 February 2016, on the radio show Advanced Placement on SiriusXM's station Alt Nation. The next day, it was released for digital download through Jackalope and Atlantic. It followed "I Feel the Weight" as the second buzz single to premiere in the weeks leading up the March release of iii. Atlantic later selected the song to serve as the album's fourth and final single; it was sent to alternative radio in the US on 15 November 2016. It was the second single overall from the album to be serviced to radio in the U.S., following "Genghis Khan". Two months prior to its radio impact, the song appeared in the racing video game Forza Horizon 3 (2016) on the in-game radio station Horizon Pulse. On 3 March 2017, a deep house remix of the song, produced by Dutch DJ duo The Him, was digitally released through Jackalope and Atlantic.

== Critical reception ==
The Heart of Me received generally positive reactions from music critics. Hitchcock of Dancing Astronaut regarded the single a "testament to how much Miike Snow have evolved" since Happy to You. The writer deemed it a suitable for "the year's warmer days" and concluded that it "highlights the group's ability to purvey upbeat, intricate production with aplomb". While reviewing iii, The Line of Best Fit's Grant Rindner noted that the song and "Genghis Khan" exhibit "earworm melodies and inescapable hooks". Rindner recognized the former's "powerful piano chords and crunchy drums", which they felt evoked "a stripped-down Passion Pit at their absolute peak". PopMatters critic Ryan Dieringer felt "The Heart of Me" recalled Spoon's album They Want My Soul (2014), writing that "Miike Snow do Eno-esque drums almost better than Eno". Eric Renner Brown, writing for Entertainment Weekly, deemed the song "vibrant", elaborating that it "sounds perfectly engineered for Spotify's running feature or the sprawling pastures of a music festival".

While reviewing the album, Dylan Stewart of The Music named "The Heart of Me" as "proof" that the band has "lost little ground in delivering their latest record". Comparing it to previous singles "Genghis Khan" and "My Trigger", Sean Maunier of Metro Weekly opined that while the song is not as memorable as the former two, "it pulses with synths and some interesting swells". DIY critic David Beech felt "The Heart of Me", along with the two aforementioned singles, "possess a pop pomp that's been hinted at only slightly in the past". He concluded, "Though there's a definite confidence in their composition, they certainly feel less organic, more contrived than before." In a negative review, Rachel Brodsky of Spin dismissed its "cheery falseness", stating that it "sounds ready to be slapped into a Target commercial, as if its only sincere yearning is for royalty checks".

At the time of its initial release, both Ilana Kaplan of New York Observer and Anders Nunstedt of Expressen named "The Heart of Me" one of the best songs released that week. Swedish magazine Café selected it as the 37th best song of 2016.

== Track listing ==
- Digital download
1. "The Heart of Me" – 3:59
- Digital download (remix)
1. "The Heart of Me" (The Him remix) – 2:43

== Credits and personnel ==
Credits are adapted from the iii liner notes.

- Andrew Wyatt – lead vocals, songwriting, background vocals, synthesizer
- Pontus Winnberg – songwriting, background vocals, piano
- Christian Karlsson – songwriting
- Miike Snow – production, engineering, mixing
- Charli XCX – background vocals
- Homer Steinweiss – drums
- S. Vaughan Merrick – additional engineer
- Niklas Flyckt – mixing
- Kevin Grainger – mastering

== Release history ==
| Country | Date | Format | Label | Ref. |
|---|---|---|---|---|
| Various countries | 19 February 2016 | Digital download (promotional) | Jackalope; Atlantic | |
| United States | 15 November 2016 | Alternative radio | Jackalope; Atlantic | |
| Various countries | 3 March 2017 | Digital download (The Him remix) | Jackalope; Atlantic | |
