= Caroline O'Hara =

English actress

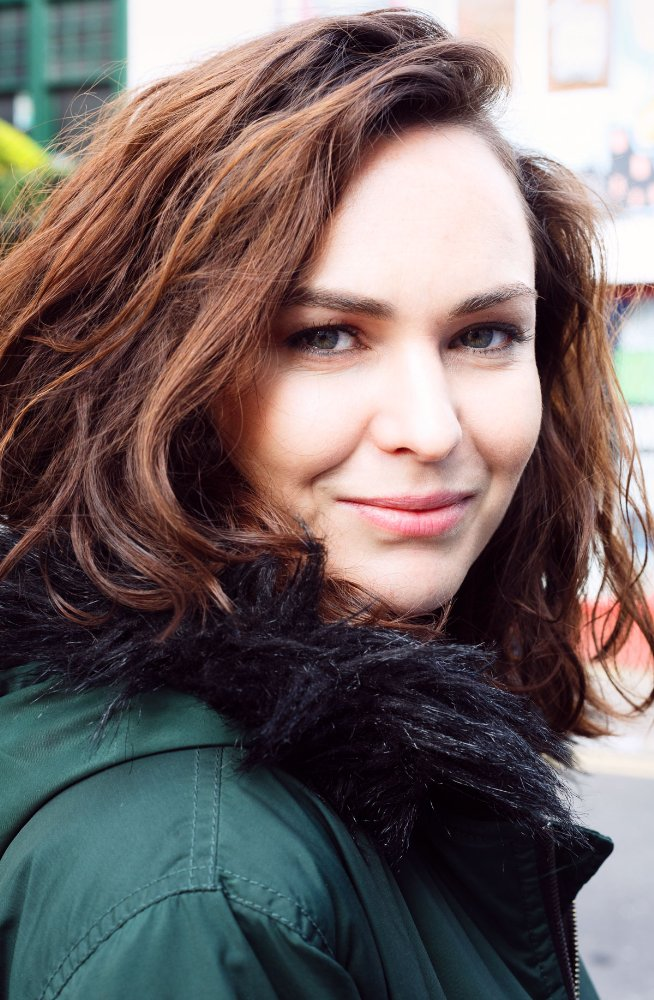
O'Hara in 2016

Caroline O'Hara is a Burnley-born, English actress who trained at The Webber Douglas Academy of Dramatic Art.

Caroline has received acclaim for performances in The Elephant Man, Cyrano de Bergerac, and The Mating Game. She portrayed Lucy Wright, an English nurse who was arrested in 2007 for attempting to smuggle 7 kg of cocaine out of Buenos Aires and subsequently escaped back to England, in a 2012 episode of Banged Up Abroad. Caroline has performed opposite Ray Winstone in Vincent, Shaun Parkes and Danny Dyer in Kiss of Death, Tom Conti in Parents, and has had leading roles in Casualty, The Bill, Emmerdale and Coronation Street. Julian Farino cast Caroline at the age of 14 to play child prostitute Justine Paiton in Out of the Blue, alongside Orla Brady and David Morrissey.

She is in the music video for the song "Genghis Khan" by Miike Snow, in the role of the wife of the Bond-villain character. She has worked on advertising campaigns for Warburtons as recurring character Michelle co-starring Robert de Niro, Sylvester Stallone, The Muppets and Peter Kay, also for House of Fraser, playing Cinderella, and was cast in a series of adverts for Walker's Crisps 'to get more young men to buy its crisps'.

In 2019, Caroline was cast as Kelly Markham on British medical soap opera Doctors, and Esther in Mike Bartlett's Life, produced by the BBC and Drama Republic.
