= Black & Blue (Miike Snow song) =

2009 single by Miike Snow

Single by Miike Snow

from the album Miike Snow
- Released: 15 October 2009
- Recorded: Robotberget (Stockholm, Sweden)
- Genre: Blue-eyed soul; electronica
- Length: 3:41
- Label: Columbia
- Songwriters: Christian Karlsson; Pontus Winnberg; Andrew Wyatt; Henrik Jonback; Juliet Richardson
- Producer: Miike Snow

Miike Snow singles chronology
| "Animal" (2009) | "Black & Blue" (2009) | "Silvia" (2010) |

"Black & Blue" is a song performed by the Swedish indie pop band Miike Snow. It was released as the second single from the band's 2009 album, Miike Snow on 15 October 2009 by Columbia Records. The song was written by the band with Henrik Jonback and Juliet Richardson. Band members Christian Karlsson and Pontus Winnberg of the production duo Bloodshy & Avant had conceptualized the chorus before forming the band with Andrew Wyatt in 2007, but saved the idea for the Miike Snow project rather than offering it to another artist. "Black & Blue" is a blue-eyed soul and electronica song that is sung in a breathy falsetto style with piano and synthesizer instrumentation.

Critics were generally positive towards "Black & Blue". The majority of them praised the piano elements and Wyatt's vocals. The single is among the band's most successful releases; it peaked at number 64 on the UK Singles Chart and reached the top 10 on the UK Dance Chart and the Flemish Ultratip chart. Vince Haycock directed its accompanying music video, in which the actor Jeff Stewart portrays a man who creates music with eccentric instruments in his apartment.

== Background ==
"Black & Blue" was written by Miike Snow's three members, Christian Karlsson, Pontus Winnberg and Andrew Wyatt, in collaboration with Henrik Jonback and Juliet Richardson. Parts of the chorus were initially conceptualized by Karlsson and Winnberg, also known as Bloodshy & Avant, prior to forming the band in 2007. Karlsson told music website musicOMH, "It's the only song on the album that we had an idea before and we kind of saved [it], like we want this song for our own project. When we met Andrew [Wyatt] and we decided to start the band, it was only an idea, but we played it for Andrew and he really liked it." It was recorded at Robotberget, the band's own studio in Stockholm, Sweden. The band produced the track and then mixed it with Anders Hvenare. Columbia Records released "Black & Blue" as the album's second single on 15 October 2009 in Europe. The digital release includes the original version and remixes by Caspa, Jaymo & Andy George, Netsky, Savage Skulls and Tiga. In the United Kingdom, the iTunes Store version comes with the original track, remixes by Tiga and Caspa, and Mark Ronson's remix of the album's first single, "Animal". A 12" vinyl was released in the United Kingdom on 19 October 2009, featuring the aforementioned "Black & Blue" remixes, excluding Netsky's.

== Composition ==
"Black & Blue"
A 22-second sample of "Black & Blue", showcasing the piano instrumentation, synth backing and Wyatt's breathy vocals.

"Black & Blue" is a blue-eyed soul and electronica piano piece. According to sheet music published at Musicnotes.com by Universal Music Publishing Group, the song is written in the time signature of common time with a moderate beat rate of 135 beats per minute. It is written in the key of A♭ major and Wyatt's vocal range spans the notes of E♭_{4} to F_{5}. It has an A♭–B♭m–Fm_{7}–Gm chord progression and a verse-chorus structure. Wyatt sings moody and melancholic lyrics in a "breathy" and "whispery" falsetto vocal style. The production features piano chords over "buzzing" synthesizers. According to BBC Music critic Fraser McAlpine, it includes Coldplay-esque breakdown sections and a "ghosty, mournful piano playing doomy dark chords". McAlpine compared the verses to "Music Sounds Better with You" (1998) by French house band Stardust, and Ben Hogwood of musicOMH likened the "soulful approach" to gospel music and works by American duo Outkast. Elliott Townsend of URB called it an "electro-pop throwback" to Curtis Mayfield's "Move On Up" (1970).

== Critical reception ==
"Black & Blue" received a positive response from music critics. John Bergstrom of PopMatters described it as "smooth, winning blue-eyed soul", and Neil Ashman of Drowned in Sound commented that its breathy vocals, piano chords and synth backing made it a "successful blend of melancholy and dancefloor-ready rhythms". Caroline Sullivan of The Guardian deemed the falsetto vocals and synths "naggingly infectious", citing it as the band's strong point: "the trio may be faceless, but they write a good tune". Sputnikmusic's staff reviewer Rudy Klapper felt that the "techno swirl" of the song "nail[s] the juxtaposition between Wyatt's moody lyrics and the irrepressible production". Fraser McAlpine of BBC Music rated "Black & Blue" four stars out of five and recommended it for when "you just need something to lift the spirits a bit, without someone shouting something stupid in your ear". He continued, "It basically wants to rub your shoulders at the end of a long hard day, and whisper something funny in your ear while your shoulders untie." Natalie Kaye of Contactmusic.com said that although it begins melancholy, it "swells to become one of the noisiest points on Miike Snow". Paul Mitchell of The Skinny felt that Wyatt channels Paddy McAloon's breathy vocal style on "Black & Blue", but without the "lyrical wit". He rated the song three stars out of five and called it "decent", finding the remixes available on the release more interesting. A more critical review came from Pitchfork's Marc Hogan, who wrote that it "promisingly ... splits the difference between Prince and piano-pop, only to underwhelm as a whole".

== Chart performance ==
In the issue dated 17 October 2009 of the UK Singles Chart, "Black & Blue" debuted at number 95. It fell off the following week, before re-entering the next at number 64, which became its peak. The song spent three weeks on the chart. In the issue dated 30 October 2009, the single entered the UK Dance Chart at number two, which became its peak. It spent five weeks on the chart; its final appearance was on 28 November 2009 at number 19. "Black & Blue" is the band's highest-peaking entry on both the UK Singles Chart and the UK Dance Chart. The song also peaked at number 58 on the Scottish Singles Chart. In Belgium, it peaked at number ten on the Flemish Ultratip chart, where it spent five weeks in total.

== Music video ==
Vince Haycock directed the music video for "Black & Blue" on location in Hackney, London, in August 2009. The clip features The Bill actor Jeff Stewart as a bearded man. The video begins with the man waking up in his apartment at noon. He conducts various experiments to create music, and finally finishes a robotic mannequin that plays the drums. This is interspersed with shots of Miike Snow band members driving a car with Wyatt singing in the backseat. Happy with his invention, the man then walks outside in his bathrobe, headphones and sunglasses past three frolicking teenagers, and hugs one of them. He continues to walk down the street where he finally meets the members of Miike Snow at a crosswalk. He removes his bathrobe, headphones and sunglasses, and walks away happily. The video premiered online in September 2009, before being released to the iTunes Store on 9 October 2009. Regarding the video, Fraser McAlpine of BBC Music remarked, "It's basically what Santa does on his days off."

== Formats and track listings ==
- 12" remix vinyl
1. "Black & Blue" (Tiga remix) – 6:21
2. "Black & Blue" (Caspa remix) – 5:35
3. "Black & Blue" (Jaymo & Andy George's Moda mix) – 5:14
4. "Black & Blue" (Savage Skulls remix) – 7:23
- Digital EP
1. "Black & Blue" – 3:41
2. "Black & Blue" (Tiga remix) – 6:21
3. "Black & Blue" (Caspa remix) – 5:35
4. "Black & Blue" (Jaymo & Andy George's Moda mix) – 5:14
5. "Black & Blue" (Netsky remix) – 5:16
6. "Black & Blue" (Savage Skulls remix) – 7:23
- UK iTunes EP
1. "Black & Blue" – 3:41
2. "Animal" (Mark Ronson remix) – 4:30
3. "Black & Blue" (Tiga remix) – 6:18
4. "Black & Blue" (Caspa remix) – 5:35

== Credits and personnel ==
- Songwriting – Christian Karlsson, Pontus Winnberg, Andrew Wyatt, Henrik Jonback, Juliet Richardson
- Production – Miike Snow
- Mixing – Anders Hvenare, Miike Snow
- Mastering – Ted Jensen

Credits are adapted from the Miike Snow liner notes.

== Charts ==
| Chart (2009–10) | Peak position |
|---|---|
| Belgium (Ultratip Bubbling Under Flanders) | 10 |
| Scottish Singles Sales (Official Charts) | 58 |
| UK Dance (Official Charts) | 2 |
| UK Singles (Official Charts) | 64 |

== Release history ==
| Country | Date | Format | Label |
|---|---|---|---|
| Europe | 15 October 2009 | Digital download | Columbia Records |
| United Kingdom | 16 October 2009 | Digital download | Columbia Records |
| United Kingdom | 19 October 2009 | 12" vinyl | Columbia Records |
