= Miike Snow (album) =

2009 studio album by Miike Snow

Studio album by Miike Snow
- Released: 22 May 2009
- Studios: Robotberget (Stockholm) (Note: Tracks 1–9); Downtown Records (New York City) (Note: Tracks 10 and 11)
- Genres: Indie pop; electropop
- Length: 47:17
- Label: Downtown
- Producer: Miike Snow

Miike Snow chronology
Miike Snow (2009)	Happy to You (2012)

Singles from Miike Snow
- 1. "Animal" Released: 17 February 2009; 2. "Black & Blue" Released: 15 October 2009; 3. "Silvia" Released: 22 January 2010

Professional ratings
Aggregate scores
Source	Rating
Metacritic	72/100
Review scores
Source	Rating
AllMusic	3.5/5 stars
BBC Music	Positive
Clash	6/10
Drowned in Sound	6/10
musicOMH	4.5/5 stars
NME	6/10
Pitchfork	5.0/10
PopMatters	7/10
Rolling Stone	3.5/5 stars
Spin	8/10

Miike Snow is the debut studio album by Swedish indie pop band Miike Snow, released in Sweden digitally on 22 May 2009 and physically on 28 October 2009. It was also released in the United States on 22 September 2009 by Downtown Records and in the United Kingdom on 26 October 2009 by Columbia Records, reaching number 59 on the UK Albums Chart. A deluxe edition was released on the iTunes Store in the US and Australia on 13 April 2010 and in Japan on 26 May 2010, including remixes of past tracks and "The Rabbit".

== Singles ==
The first single to be taken from the album was "Animal", released on 17 February 2009, which reached as far as number 98 on the UK Singles Chart. "Black & Blue", the album's second single, was released on 15 October 2009 and became the band's most successful single to date when it peaked at number 64 on the UK Singles Chart. Third single "Silvia" was released on 22 January 2010 in the UK, but failed to break the top 100 and instead peaked at number 154.

== Track listing ==
All tracks are written by Christian Karlsson, Pontus Winnberg and Andrew Wyatt, except where noted.

Miike Snow – standard edition track listing
No.	Title	Length
1.	"Animal" (Karlsson, Winnberg, Wyatt, Henrik Jonback)	4:23
2.	"Burial"	4:21
3.	"Silvia"	6:26
4.	"Song for No One"	4:10
5.	"Black & Blue" (Karlsson, Winnberg, Wyatt, Jonback, Juliet Richardson)	3:41
6.	"Sans Soleil"	4:27
7.	"A Horse Is Not a Home"	4:13
8.	"Cult Logic"	3:56
9.	"Plastic Jungle"	3:54
10.	"In Search Of"	5:16
11.	"Faker"	2:34

Miike Snow – European edition bonus track
No.	Title	Length
12.	"Billie Holiday"	4:01

Miike Snow – Australian expanded edition bonus tracks
No.	Title	Length
12.	"Silvia" (eRNEST & AMz Remix)	5:04
13.	"Billie Holiday"	4:01
14.	"The Rabbit"	4:26
15.	"Silvia" (Roboberget Remix)	7:57
16.	"Animal" (Mark Ronson Extended Remix)	4:56
17.	"Burial" (DJ Mehdi Remix)	3:32

Miike Snow – Japanese edition bonus tracks
No.	Title	Length
12.	"The Rabbit"	4:26
13.	"Billie Holiday"	3:59
14.	"Animal" (Mark Ronson Extended Remix)	4:56
15.	"Burial" (DJ Medhi Remix)	3:32
16.	"Silvia" (Hook N Sling & Goodwill Remix)	7:54

Miike Snow – European digital edition bonus tracks
No.	Title	Length
12.	"Animal" (Mark Ronson Remix)	4:30
13.	"Black & Blue" (Tiga Remix)	6:19
14.	"Animal" (In the Woods Session) (video)	5:15
15.	"Black & Blue" (In the Woods Session) (video)	5:11

Miike Snow – US, Australian and Japanese digital deluxe edition bonus tracks
No.	Title	Length
12.	"The Rabbit"	4:26
13.	"Billie Holiday"	3:59
14.	"Animal" (Mark Ronson Extended Remix)	4:56
15.	"Silvia" (Roboberget Remix)	7:57
16.	"Burial" (DJ Medhi Remix)	3:32

== Personnel ==
- Miike Snow – production, mixing
- Anders Hvenare – mixing (tracks 1–6, 8, 9, 11)
- Niklas Flyckt – mixing (tracks 7, 10)
- Ted Jensen – mastering
- Sebastian Mlynarski – inner sleeve, band portraits
- Dirk Vandenberk – cover image photography

== Charts ==
=== Weekly charts ===
Weekly chart performance for Miike Snow
Chart (2009–2010)	Peak position
Greek International Albums (IFPI)	42
Scottish Albums (Official Charts)	65
UK Albums (Official Charts)	59
UK Dance Albums (Official Charts)	1
US Top Dance Albums (Billboard)	11
US Heatseekers Albums (Billboard)	15

=== Year-end charts ===
Year-end chart performance for Miike Snow
Chart (2010)	Position
US Top Dance/Electronic Albums (Billboard)	19

== Release history ==
Release dates and formats for Miike Snow
Region	Date	Format	Edition	Label	Ref(s)
Sweden	22 May 2009	Digital download	Standard	Sony	
United States	9 June 2009	CD	Standard	Downtown	
Australia	2 July 2009	CD	Expanded	Downtown	
Australia	3 July 2009	CD	Standard	Downtown	
United States	22 September 2009	Digital download	Standard	Downtown	
Germany	23 October 2009	CD; digital download	Standard	Sony	
United Kingdom	23 October 2009	Digital download	Standard	Columbia	
United Kingdom	26 October 2009	CD	Standard	Columbia	
Sweden	28 October 2009	CD	Standard	Sony	
Australia	13 April 2010	Digital download	Deluxe	Downtown	
United States	13 April 2010	Digital download	Deluxe	Downtown	
Japan	26 May 2010	CD	Standard	Hostess	
Japan	26 May 2010	Digital download	Deluxe	Hostess	
