= Iii (Miike Snow album) =

iii

Studio album by Miike Snow
- Released: 4 March 2016
- Genres: Indie pop; electropop
- Length: 36:48
- Labels: Downtown; Atlantic
- Producers: Miike Snow; Henrik Jonback

Miike Snow chronology
Happy to You (2012)	iii (2016)

Singles from iii
- 1. "Heart Is Full" Released: 30 October 2015; 2. "Genghis Khan" Released: 3 December 2015; 3. "My Trigger" Released: 9 September 2016; 4. "The Heart of Me" Released: 15 November 2016

iii (stylized on the album cover as MiiiKE SN!!!W) is the third studio album by Swedish indie pop band Miike Snow. It was released in the United States on 4 March 2016.

== Production ==
The band teased their third album, and its leadoff single "Heart Is Full", on social media on 19 October 2015. On 29 October 2015, the band debuted "Heart Is Full" on the radio station Beats 1. On 3 December 2015, the band debuted the album's second single, "Genghis Khan", and announced the release date of the album.

== Singles ==
The first single to be taken from the album was "Heart Is Full", released on 30 October 2015, which debuted on Beats 1 the day before. The video for "Heart Is Full" was released on 11 November 2015. The music video was directed by Lance Drake. The second single, "Genghis Khan", was released on 3 December 2015.

The official music video for the album's fourth single, "My Trigger", was released on 22 August 2016. On 30 September 2016, the Mark Ronson remix of "Heart Is Full" was released. "The Heart of Me" was released as the fourth single in the United States on 15 November 2016 and is included in the soundtrack of the video game Forza Horizon 3.

== Promotion ==
The band performed the songs "Heart Is Full" and "Genghis Khan" on Jimmy Kimmel Live! on 1 March 2016. In addition, they announced a tour in 2016 to promote the album. The tour began on 3 March 2016 and is scheduled to end on 29 July 2016. Specific dates within the tour are part of major music festivals, including Coachella, the Governors Ball Music Festival and Lollapalooza, as well as others. The band also performed at SXSW on 16 March 2016.

== Critical reception ==
Professional ratings
Aggregate scores
Source	Rating
Metacritic	68/100
Review scores
Source	Rating
Consequence of Sound	C+
DIY	3/5 stars
Entertainment Weekly	B
The Guardian	3/5 stars
Rolling Stone Australia	3.5/4 stars

The album received generally favorable reviews upon release. As of 8 March 2016, Metacritic assigned the album an average score of 68 on a normalized scale of 100. Entertainment Weekly praised the sound of the album, noting that "for Miike Snow, words are hardly the point. iii's guiding principle seems to be style over substance—and Miike Snow have that in spades." The Boston Globe gave a more mixed reaction to the album, saying "the album does offer some irresistible moments, but they evaporate quickly".

== Track listing ==
All tracks produced by Miike Snow; "Genghis Khan" and "Back of the Car" co-produced by Henrik Jonback.

Standard version
No.	Title	Writer(s)	Length
1.	"My Trigger"	Christian Karlsson; Pontus Winnberg; Andrew Wyatt; James Yancey; Dennis Thomas; George Brown; Robert Mickens; Robert "Kool" Bell; Ronald Bell; Robert Westfield; Claydes Charles Smith	3:12
2.	"The Heart of Me"	Karlsson; Winnberg; Wyatt	3:59
3.	"Genghis Khan"	Karlsson; Winnberg; Wyatt; Henrik Jonback	3:32
4.	"Heart Is Full"	Karlsson; Winnberg; Wyatt; Vincent Pontare; Bob Hilliard; Burt Bacharach	3:33
5.	"For U" (featuring Charli XCX)	Karlsson; Winnberg; Wyatt	3:42
6.	"I Feel the Weight"	Karlsson; Winnberg; Wyatt	3:43
7.	"Back of the Car"	Karlsson; Winnberg; Wyatt; Jonback	3:36
8.	"Lonely Life"	Karlsson; Winnberg; Wyatt; Patrik Berger; Amanda Warner; Markus Krunegård	3:15
9.	"Over and Over"	Karlsson; Winnberg; Wyatt; Jimmy Koitzsch	4:08
10.	"Longshot (7 Nights)"	Karlsson; Winnberg; Wyatt; Berger	4:08
Total length:			36:48

Digital version (bonus track)
No.	Title	Writer(s)	Length
11.	"Heart Is Full" (featuring Run the Jewels) (remix)	Karlsson; Winnberg; Wyatt; Pontare; Hilliard; Bacharach; Jaime Meline; Michael Santiago Render	3:57
Total length:			40:45

Sample credits

- "My Trigger" contains elements from "Fruitman" by Kool & the Gang.
- "Heart Is Full" contains elements from "Waiting for Charlie to Come Home" by Marlena Shaw.
- "I Feel the Weight" contains elements from "In Too Deep" by Genesis.

== Charts ==
Chart (2016)	Peak position
Australian Albums (ARIA)	18
Belgian Albums (Ultratop Flanders)	110
Canadian Albums (Billboard)	42
Swedish Albums (Sverigetopplistan)	28
US Billboard 200	47
US Top Alternative Albums (Billboard)	5
US Digital Albums (Billboard)	10
US Top Rock Albums (Billboard)	7
US Indie Store Album Sales (Billboard)	24
