= Juliet Richardson =

American singer

- Also known as: Juliet
- Born: Philadelphia, Pennsylvania, U.S.
- Occupation: Singer
- Instrument: Vocals
- Years active: 2000–present

Juliet Richardson, known under the mononym Juliet, is an American singer. She is best known for her 2005 album, Random Order, and the single "Avalon".

== Early life and education ==
A resident of Shamong Township, New Jersey, Richardson is a graduate of Life Center Academy in Burlington, New Jersey.

== Career ==
Richardson's recording debut was in 2000 as the singer for 1 Plus 1. Their single "Cherry Bomb", from the album of the same title, reached the Top 40 of the Billboard Hot Dance Club Play chart in 2001, as well as the Top 50 in the Dance chart.

Despite the initial promise of success, Richardson expressed displeasure with the marketing direction of the group, and the act was recreated as alternative rock band MNQNN (pronounced "mannequin"). Their music, differing greatly from prior 1 Plus 1 work, prompted Elektra to release them from their recording contract. MNQNN played rock clubs for a few years, before going on an indefinite hiatus in June 2003.

In 2004, Richardson returned to major label recording after being introduced to record producer Stuart Price (also known as Jacques Lu Cont) under the name Juliet. The album resulting from this project, Random Order, was released in August 2005; reviews of advance copies were well received by critics. The advance single "Avalon" reached the top five on the European Dance chart in May 2005, and number one on the US Billboard Hot Dance Club Play chart in March 2005. The song also reached the Top 30 of the UK Singles Chart in April 2005. She scored a second number one on the US dance chart in August with "Ride the Pain".

In August 2005, Richardson released her debut album on Virgin Records. Apart from Price, Richardson also collaborated with other producers, including Guy Sigsworth on the song "New Shoes" and Jacknife Lee on "Ride the Pain".

In 2007, the singer collaborated with David Guetta on the track "Do Something Love" from his album Pop Life.

== Personal life ==
In December 2012, Richardson and her husband, Kyle Korver, welcomed their first child, a girl named Kyra Elyse. She gave birth to a son, Knox Elliot, on October 4, 2014. The couple's second son, Koen, was born on November 7, 2016.

== Discography ==
Albums

- Random Order (2005)

Singles

List of singles, with selected chart positions
Title	Year	Peak chart positions	Album
Title	Year	AUS	Album
"Ride the Pain"	2005	—	Random Order
"Avalon"	2005	52	Random Order
