= Genghis Khan (Miike Snow song) =

2015 single by Miike Snow

Single by Miike Snow

from the album iii
- Released: 3 December 2015
- Genre: Electropop
- Length: 3:32
- Label: Jackalope; Atlantic
- Songwriters: Christian Karlsson; Pontus Winnberg; Andrew Wyatt; Henrik Jonback
- Producers: Miike Snow; Jonback

Miike Snow singles chronology
"Heart Is Full" (2015)	"Genghis Khan" (2015)	"My Trigger" (2016)

"Genghis Khan" is a song performed by Swedish indie pop band Miike Snow from their third studio album, iii (2016). Written and produced by the band alongside Henrik Jonback, the song was conceived when lead singer Andrew Wyatt felt like a tyrant while in a long-distance relationship, comparing his cruelty to that of Mongolian emperor Genghis Khan. Wyatt did not want to commit to the relationship, while simultaneously not wanting her being involved with anybody else. Wyatt believed the public could relate to this irrational jealousy, recognizing it as a truth of human nature. Musically, "Genghis Khan" is an electropop song with funk and R&B influences and lyrics which see the protagonist likening his jealousy to the behavior of the Mongolian emperor.

"Genghis Khan" was released as iii's second single on 3 December 2015 through Jackalope and Atlantic. It attracted generally positive reviews from music critics, many of whom regarded it a focal point on iii and commended its catchiness, although some critiqued its subject matter. Commercially, it is among the band's most successful singles and appeared on several Billboard charts, achieving its highest peak at number six on Alternative Airplay. The song received a platinum certification by the Recording Industry Association of America (RIAA). "Genghis Khan" became Miike Snow's first song to chart in their native Sweden, peaking at number eight on the Heatseeker chart. The single also peaked at number 86 in Canada, where it was certified gold, and at number 44 in Australia.

The accompanying music video for "Genghis Khan", directed by Ninian Doff, depicts a love story between a villain and a James Bond-esque spy. The visual was met with acclaim from commentators, who applauded its theme and choreography. It received two UK Music Video Awards and a Webby Award nomination. Miike Snow has performed live renditions of "Genghis Khan" on several occasions, including Jimmy Kimmel Live! and the radio program Morning Becomes Eclectic. In 2016, American duo MS MR performed a live cover of the song for Triple J's Like a Version.

== Background and release ==
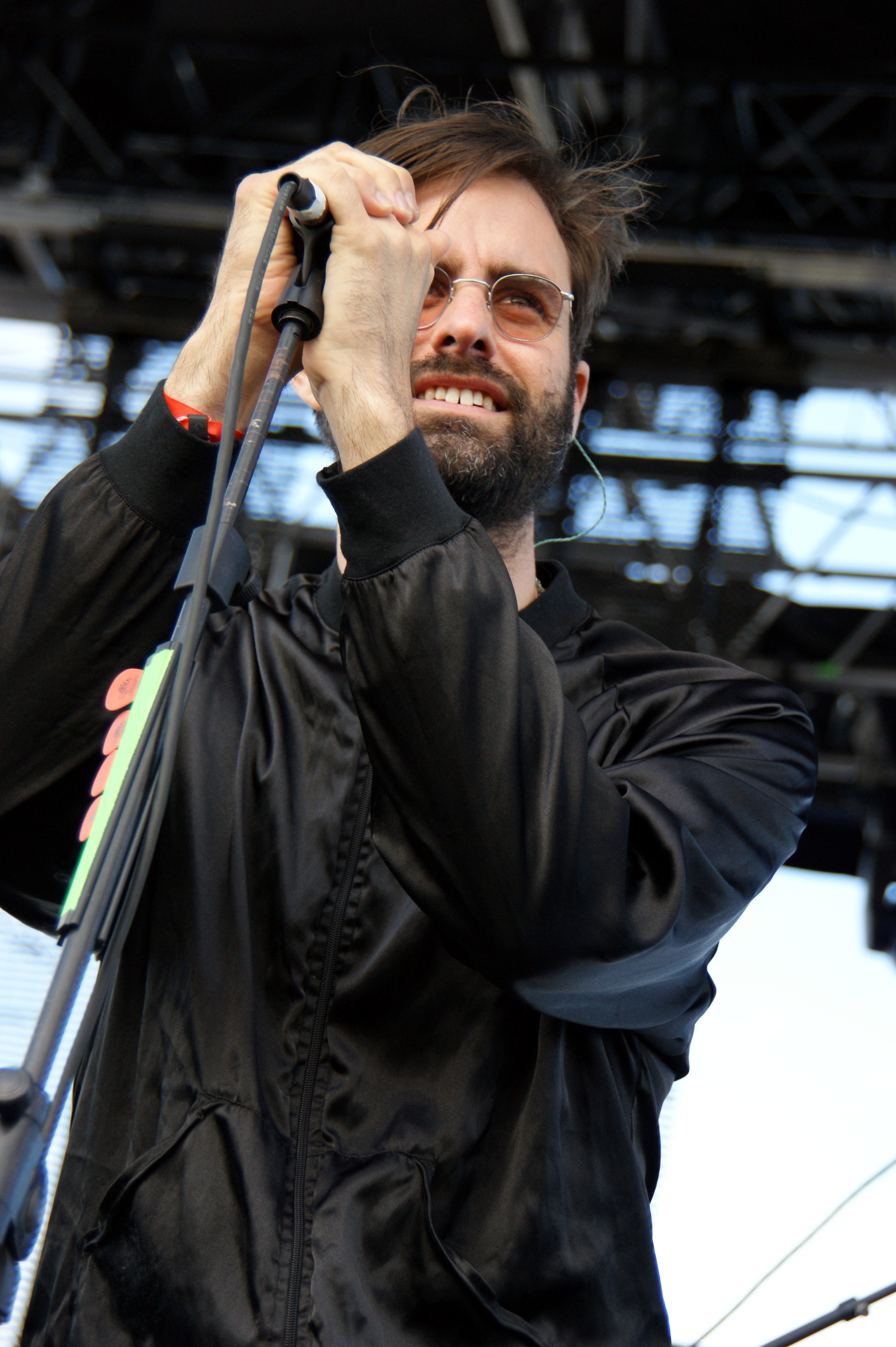
Lead singer Andrew Wyatt wrote "Genghis Khan" about a previous relationship.

"Genghis Khan" was written by Miike Snow's three members, Christian Karlsson, Pontus Winnberg and Andrew Wyatt, in collaboration with Henrik Jonback, for the band's third studio album, iii (2016). While in the studio in Los Angeles, California, Karlsson had conceptualized the general melody and beats for a track when vocalist Wyatt began singing about Genghis Khan, a 13th-century Mongolian emperor. Karlsson said, "I was like get a microphone and sing it and he did and we kept it ... So 'Genghis Khan' came from his brain, it was something that went down really quickly and that's what came out." Karlsson told The Wall Street Journal that the song started coming together after about 30 minutes. After recording the verses and chorus, Wyatt added a "whoo-oo-oo" hook, inspired by a child he overheard singing along to Akon's vocals on Gwen Stefani's song "The Sweet Escape" (2006).

The chorus came about when Wyatt thought of himself and how he felt while in an undefined long-distance relationship with a woman he was not committing to, yet at the same time he did not want her seeing anyone else. In an interview for Notion, he explained he felt like a "tyrant" and thought the notion of feeling the need to "have every girl" is "a little bit Genghis Khan", perceiving it as a "natural metaphor" for him. He further elaborated on the topic of tyranny in a separate interview for Nylon, "I felt that the nature of tyranny comes from that place, where you're entitled to freedom and choice and the other person has to be subjected to your scheme of things." He clarified that he is not endorsing Genghis Khan, but rather "identifying a negative property within [him]self" when referencing the emperor.

"Genghis Khan" is one of two tracks on iii that were co-produced by the band and Jonback, along with "Back of the Car". While working on their previous studio album Happy to You (2012), the band focused on a uniform sound as Wyatt wanted to present a consistent character during concerts. This changed for iii as the singer put his focus on his studio efforts rather than his stage performance. He adapted his singing style based on the needs of each song throughout the album, using a "sneering tone" on "Genghis Khan". The track was mixed by the band and Niklas Flyckt. Flyckt utilized a Urei 1176LN limiting amplifier to emphasize the ghost notes, and a Thermionic Culture Vulture to enhance the sound without causing digital domain issues. In an interview for Electronic Musician, he noted the song has a loop with automation on the drums, and said the combination of the 1176LN and Culture Vulture played an important role in keeping the "older sound" of the drums.

"Genghis Khan" premiered on Miike Snow's official YouTube channel on 3 December 2015, with a promotional video containing nine panels of vertically rotating graphics. Jackalope and Atlantic distributed it to digital retailers on the same date as the second single for iii, preceding the release of the album. The single was subsequently sent to alternative radio in the United States on 12 January 2016. In 29 January 2016, Another digital release subtitled Remixes was made available. The set contains five remixes by Louis the Child, Hook n Sling, Empress Of, CID and Yacht Club. In Italy, "Genghis Khan" was serviced to contemporary hit radio on 4 March 2016.

== Composition and lyrics ==
"Genghis Khan"
A sample of "Genghis Khan", showcasing its chorus with Wyatt's falsetto vocals, followed by the "Doo-oo" chant and backed by piano instrumentation.

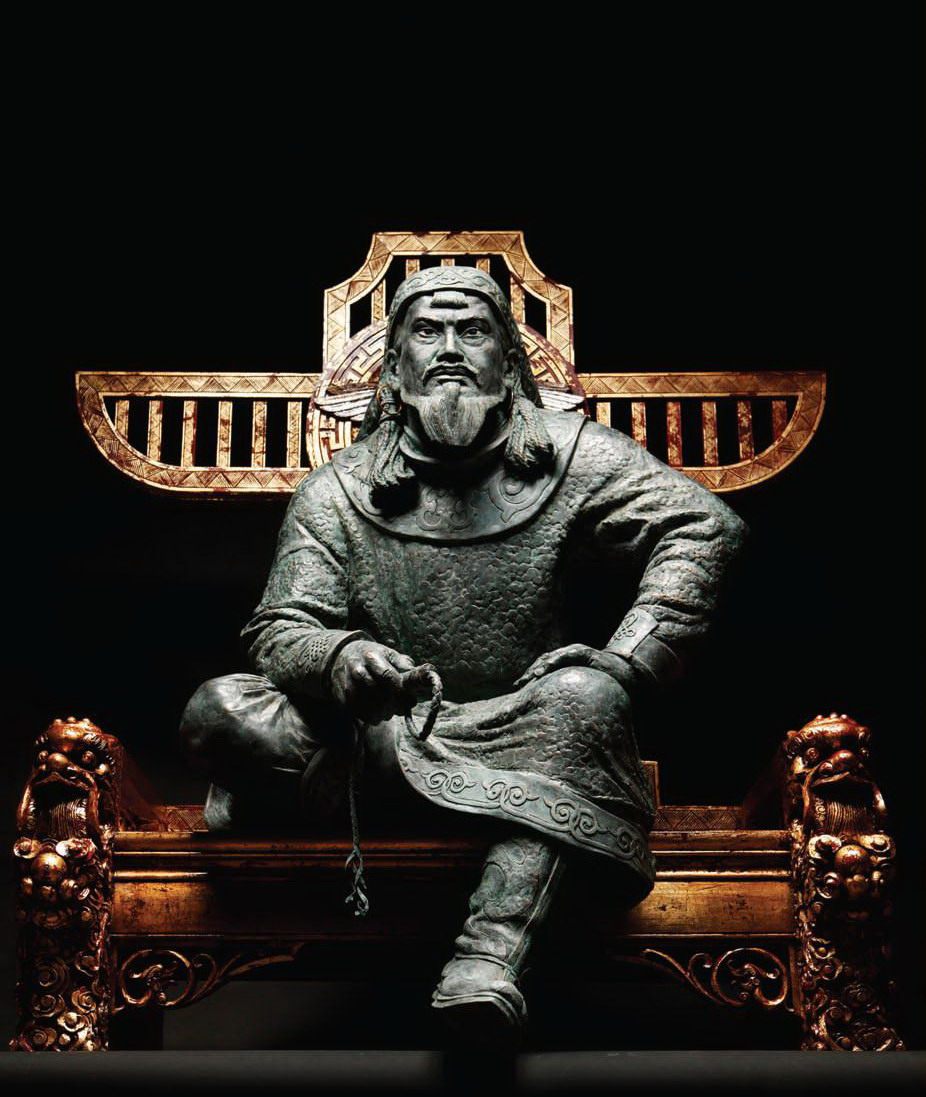
The song's protagonist compares himself to Genghis Khan.

Musically, "Genghis Khan" is an electropop song with funk and R&B flourishes. Instrumentation is provided by drums, a piano and a synthesizer. The piece includes layered vocal tracks and parts with "Doo-oo-doo-oo" chants, as well as an Arabian riff. Wyatt utilizes a falsetto vocal style throughout the song. Spin critic Rachel Brodsky likened the structure of the bridge to the song "One Minute Man" (2001) by American rapper Missy Elliott.

The lyrics of "Genghis Khan" speak of a jealous protagonist not wanting to commit to a woman, but still not wanting her to be involved with anyone else. In the chorus, Wyatt compares his romantic jealousy to Mongolian emperor Genghis Khan as he sings "I get a little bit Genghis Khan / I don't want you to get it on with nobody else but me". Wyatt said the song is "about a feeling, a spirit, a feeling of pain, of jealousy, of cruelty that we all have." news.com.au's Mikey Cahill described the song as "Scandinavian ingenuity teamed with neurotic US therapy-talk", and Chris Schulz of The New Zealand Herald viewed it as an "upbeat love song". musicOMH critic Ben Hogwood wrote that while the lyrics could be perceived as "too possessive", Wyatt's "sweetly-sung tones" make them appear "strangely affectionate". Wyatt considers the "irrational jealousy and the potential for violence" of the song as "broad truths of the human experience". He stated,

I just think people like to hear lyrics they can connect to ... I think that level of songwriting has become more common; that people really wanna hear the real shit about what's going on in your personal life ... It's kind of everywhere in pop. And a lot of what we experience in life is not positive all the time, so it's just a reality and it's one of the things that, across the board, everyone has felt.

== Critical reception ==
"Genghis Khan" was met with generally positive reviews from music critics. While reviewing its parent album, Derek Staples of Consequence of Sound named it an essential track and wrote, "Little more than a foot-stomper about adolescent trust issues, 'Genghis Khan' flips the legacy of the violent ruler to comedic effects." Clash's Luke Winstanley described it as "outrageously catchy", and Neil Z. Yeung of AllMusic deemed it a highlight on iii. Noisey writer John Hill named it a "certified banger". Sean Maunier of Metro Weekly regarded it as "catchy and infectious", writing "It's about as much fun as you can have with a song about trust issues, and luckily, it never becomes too self-serious." Emily Zemler of Relix wrote that the single "has a groovy jaunt in its step and a catchy precision to its chorus". Writing for PopMatters, Ryan Dieringer applauded the hook and compared its "heart" to works by Swedish band Amason, of which Winnberg is a member, writing that "Genghis Khan" exhibits "just as much heart, and twice the hook". Similarly, Lee Butler of Vue Weekly praised the "powerful hooks and extensive production" of "Genghis Khan", and the writer named it their favorite track on iii. Butler opined that Wyatt's falsetto range "allows you to forget you're singing metaphorically about the jealousy of a relationship and the Emperor of the Mongol Empire".

Eric Renner Brown of Entertainment Weekly felt the band's "expertise doesn't always extend to their lyrics", defining the comparison of jealousy and a Mongolian warlord as "ill-fated". Ken Capobianco of The Boston Globe felt the production of iii overcompensates for Wyatt's vocals and "poorly conceived lyrics". Capobiano concluded, "The sketchy self-loathing and creepy possessiveness of 'Genghis Khan' is transformed into ingratiating dance music for women filing restraining orders." DIY critic David Beech opined its pop composition showed confidence, but considered it to be "less organic, more contrived" than the band's earlier work. Brodsky of Spin argued that "better ideas on paper manage to fall flat", asserting that "The otherwise promising 'Genghis Khan' sounds like a Gorillaz mock-child's hand-game chant before straight-up jacking Missy Elliott's 'One Minute Man' on the bridge."

== Chart performance ==
"Genghis Khan" made its debut on the Swedish Heatseeker chart on 3 March 2016, at number nine. This made it the first of the band's singles to chart in their native Sweden. The next week, it rose to number eight, which became its peak position. In Australia, "Genghis Khan" charted for three weeks on the singles chart and peaked at number 44. In Canada, the single charted for a week at number 86 on the Canadian Hot 100 in the issue dated 26 March 2016. It also reached number 12 on Billboard's Canada Rock. The single later received a gold certification by Music Canada on 5 October 2016, denoting sales of over 40,000 digital units.

In the United States, "Genghis Khan" debuted at number 39 on the Billboard Alternative Airplay chart, ranked by airplay detections, in the issue dated 26 December 2015. It fell off the following week, and re-entered in the issue dated 9 January 2016, at number 33. The single reached its peak position at number six on 14 May 2016. It spent a total of 22 weeks on the chart. "Genghis Khan" also appeared on Hot Rock & Alternative Songs, measured by airplay, sales and streaming activity. It debuted at number 45 in the 20 January 2016 issue of Billboard. The song peaked at number 12 on 26 March 2016, and spent 21 weeks on the chart in total. It also appeared at number 12 on the Rock Airplay chart, in addition to placements at number 22 and 26 on Alternative Digital Songs and Rock Digital Songs, respectively. By the end of 2016, Billboard ranked "Genghis Khan" at number 25 on the year-end chart of Alternative Airplay, and number 35 on the year-end chart of Hot Rock & Alternative Songs. The song was certified platinum by the Recording Industry Association of America (RIAA) on 20 November 2020.

== Music video ==
Ninian Doff directed the accompanying music video for "Genghis Khan". The concept of the video follows a James Bond-esque theme in which a villain struggles to kill his captive due to personal conflicts. In an interview for Vice's The Creators Project, Doff explained he chose to use a villain as the protagonist due to the song itself, "I thought it was really funny and clever that [Miike Snow] managed to reference a man who was responsible for the death of about 40 million people in a happy sing along love song." He began thinking of "evil people falling in love" and conceived a story about an archetypal movie villain struggling with human emotions. Winnberg told Swedish magazine QX that they chose between twenty different concepts before settling on the gay romance between the villain and the spy. Patrick Meller provided the video's cinematography and Supple Nam created the choreography. It was produced by Pulse Films, with Ross Hallard as editor, Rik Green as producer and Tim Gibson as production designer. The video stars Adam Jones as the villain and Edward Hayes Neary as the spy. The two actors returned in new roles in the visual for iii's next single "My Trigger", also directed by Doff.

As the "Genghis Khan" video commences, the villain is holding the Bond-like spy captive in his lair. Just as he is about to push a button to kill his captive, his shift ends, leaving the spy's fate to the next work day. At home, the villain is shown to be unhappy in his marriage to his wife (Caroline O'Hara). Instead of completing his task, the villain ultimately chooses to release his captive, who then makes an attempt to escape. However, in a last minute change of heart, he voluntarily returns to his captor. The two characters then unite through a joint dance sequence, while the villain is seemingly happy for the first time in the video. The video explores themes of homosexuality, as seen by the protagonist of the story leaving his wife to start a new life with his male former captive. The story ends with the protagonist's ex-wife vengefully spying on him and his male partner, seemingly plotting her revenge.

The video premiered on 12 January 2016 via BuzzFeed. It was met with positive remarks from commentators. Zach Blumenfeld of Paste and Maunier of Metro Weekly applauded the choreography. The Daily Dot's Gavia Baker-Whitelaw viewed it as "an excellent parody ... mimicking set design and color schemes from vintage Bond movies", and noted fan art dedicated to the video had appeared on social networking site Tumblr. In 2016, the video was nominated for four UK Music Video Awards, winning for Best Pop Video (International) and Best Cinematography. The clip was also nominated in the music video category at the 2017 Webby Awards.

== Live performances and cover version ==
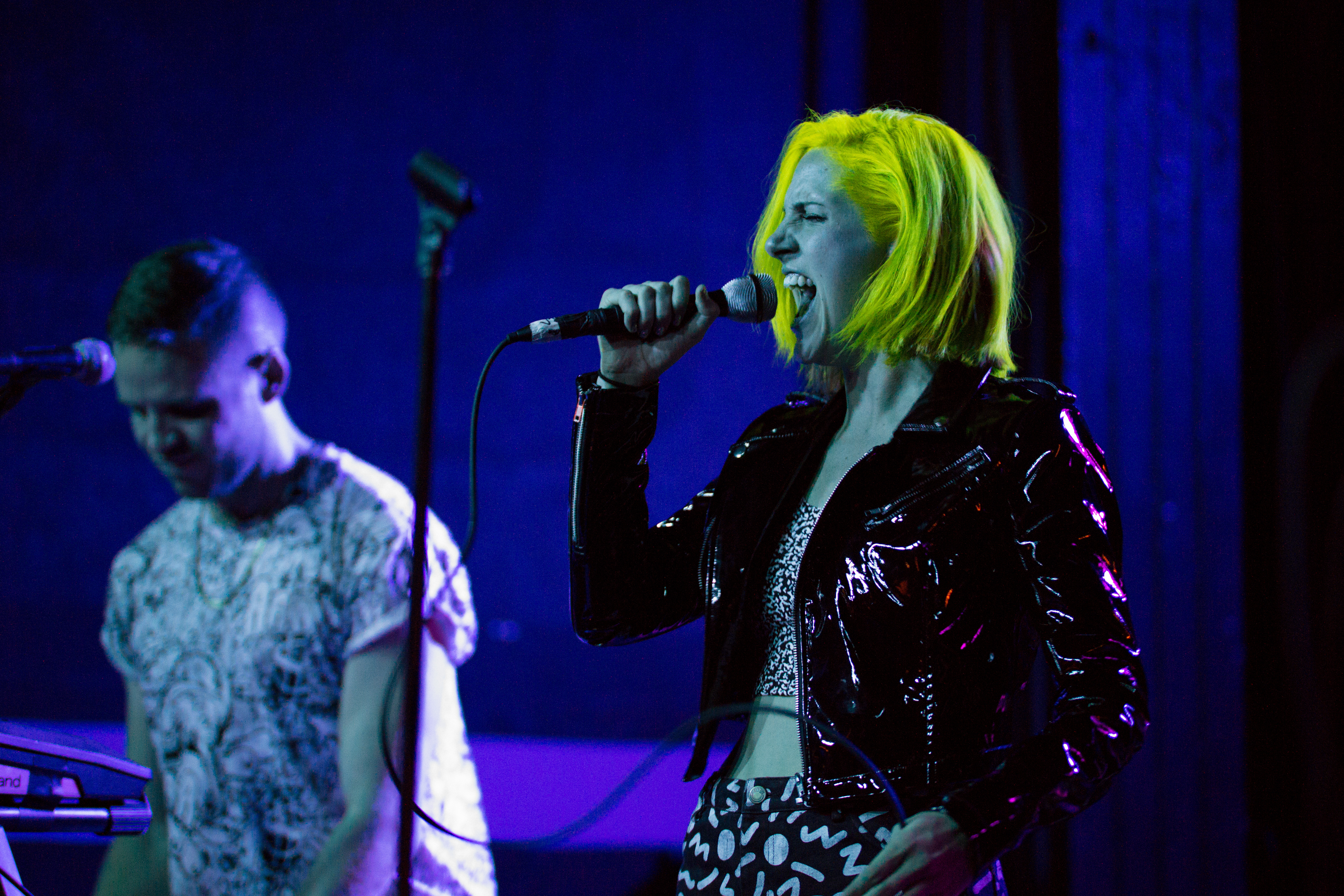
American duo MS MR performed a live cover of "Genghis Khan" in 2016.

Miike Snow performed "Genghis Khan" with added horn instrumentation alongside previous single "Heart Is Full" on Jimmy Kimmel Live! in March 2016. On 7 March 2016, the band performed the song at Paste Studio in New York City for music magazine Paste. The performance was then uploaded to the magazine's website on 4 April. Wyatt and Winnberg performed an alternative version of the single together with "Animal" and "I Feel the Weight" at the studio of musician Jim Eno in Austin, Texas, on 16 March 2016. Winnberg created a new beat for "Genghis Khan" on the spot using a Teenage Engineering OP-1 keyboard. The audio recording was subsequently released as part of the Spotify Sessions EP on streaming service Spotify. On 18 April 2016, Miike Snow included "Genghis Khan" in a live set at Apogee Studios for radio station KCRW. The set aired on the station's radio program Morning Becomes Eclectic on 3 May. The band also performed the single on the iii World Tour in North America and Europe throughout 2016.

On 29 April 2016, American duo MS MR covered "Genghis Khan" for Australian radio station Triple J's segment Like a Version. This rendition begins with a rhythm-less intro, followed by a keyboard and synth-based beat for the remainder of the song. The cover is included on the compilation album Like a Version 12 (2016).

== Track listings ==
- Digital download
1. "Genghis Khan" – 3:32
- Digital EP – Remixes
1. "Genghis Khan" (Louis the Child remix) – 3:16
2. "Genghis Khan" (Hook n Sling remix) – 4:32
3. "Genghis Khan" (Empress Of remix) – 3:08
4. "Genghis Khan" (CID remix) – 4:15
5. "Genghis Khan" (Yacht Club remix) – 4:17

== Credits and personnel ==
Credits are adapted from the iii liner notes.

- Christian Karlsson – songwriting
- Pontus Winnberg – songwriting
- Andrew Wyatt – songwriting, piano
- Henrik Jonback – songwriting, production, piano
- Miike Snow – production, engineering, mixing
- Nisse Törnqvist – drums
- Pierre Riddez – assistant engineering
- Niklas Flyckt – mixing
- Kevin Grainger – mastering

== Charts ==
=== Weekly charts ===
Chart (2016)	Peak position
Australia (ARIA)	44
Canada Hot 100 (Billboard)	86
Canada Rock (Billboard)	12
Iceland (Tónlistinn)	19
Sweden Heatseeker (Sverigetopplistan)	8
US Hot Rock & Alternative Songs (Billboard)	12
US Rock & Alternative Airplay (Billboard)	12

=== Year-end charts ===
Chart (2016)	Position
US Hot Rock & Alternative Songs (Billboard)	35
US Rock Airplay (Billboard)	36

== Certifications ==
Region	Certification	Certified units/sales
Canada (Music Canada)	Gold	40,000^{‡}
United States (RIAA)	Platinum	1,000,000^{‡}
^{‡} Sales+streaming figures based on certification alone.

== Release history ==
Country	Date	Format	Label	Ref.
Various countries	3 December 2015	Digital download	Jackalope; Atlantic	
United States	12 January 2016	Alternative radio	Jackalope; Atlantic	
Various countries	29 January 2016	Digital EP – Remixes	Jackalope; Atlantic	
Italy	4 March 2016	Contemporary hit radio	Jackalope; Atlantic	
