= Silvia (song) =

Single by Miike Snow

from the album Miike Snow
- Released: 22 January 2010
- Studio: Robotberget (Stockholm, Sweden)
- Genre: Electronic
- Length: 6:26
- Label: Columbia
- Songwriters: Christian Karlsson; Pontus Winnberg; Andrew Wyatt
- Producer: Miike Snow

Miike Snow singles chronology
"Black & Blue" (2009)	"Silvia" (2010)	"Remedy" (2010)

"Silvia" is a song performed by Swedish indie pop band Miike Snow. Written and produced by the band, it is a six-minute electronic piano ballad that features drum and synthesizer instrumentation and electro house beats. Lyrically, it speaks of longing and lead singer Andrew Wyatt's vocals are edited with Auto-Tune. "Silvia" served as the third and final single from the band's 2009 self-titled debut album. Columbia Records first digitally released it as a remix extended play (EP) on 22 January 2010. Band members Christian Karlsson and Pontus Winnberg contributed their own remix to the release, using the alias Robotberget.

Critical reception of "Silvia" was generally positive; many critics deemed it the album's centerpiece and criticized its early placement as the third track on Miike Snow. The single achieved minor chart success in the United Kingdom; it became the band's second entry on the UK Dance Chart, peaking at number 16. However, it missed the top 100 of the UK Singles Chart as it only reached number 154. The accompanying music video was directed by Marcus Söderlund and plays out in a post-apocalyptic setting.

== Background ==
"Silvia" was written and produced by Miike Snow's three members, Christian Karlsson, Pontus Winnberg and Andrew Wyatt. It was recorded at Robotberget, the band's own studio in Stockholm, Sweden. The band mixed it with Anders Hvenare and mastering was handled by Ted Jensen. Wyatt explained during an interview for The Aquarian Weekly that "Silvia" is likely "the most autobiographical song" on the band's 2009 self-titled debut album as it was inspired by a real event of a stripper Wyatt dated who "straightened out" and quit. According to Wyatt, the band especially liked the song because it shares names with Queen Silvia of Sweden. Music magazine Clash announced on 10 December 2009 that "Silvia" had been selected as the third single from the album. The announcement revealed it would coincide with a United Kingdom concert tour from January through February 2010. Columbia Records released the single on 22 January 2010, as a digital extended play (EP) containing remixes made by Emalkay, Felix da Housecat, Hugg & Pepp and Sinden. Karlsson and Winnberg also contributed their own remix to the release, using the alias Robotberget. Columbia issued a 12" vinyl, featuring the aforementioned remixes, in the United Kingdom on 8 February 2010. Progressive house musicians Sebastian Ingrosso and Dirty South released their own remix of "Silvia" on 2 April 2010, licensed to Ingrosso's label Refune Music.

== Composition ==
"Silvia"
A 30-second sample of "Silvia", showcasing the electronic instrumentation and Wyatt's Auto-Tune vocals.

"Silvia" is a six-minute electronic piano ballad with electro house beats. Instrumentation is provided by drums, a piano and synthesizers. John Fortunato of The Aquarian Weekly likened it to works by German electronic band Kraftwerk, and Martin Turenne of The Georgia Straight felt it held a "blissful groove of '90s-era piano-led house". According to sheet music published at Musicnotes.com by Alfred Publishing, the song is written in the time signature of common time with a moderate beat rate of 125 beats per minute. It is written in the key of E♭ major and Wyatt's vocal range spans the notes of E♭_{4} to E♭_{6}. It follows a sequence of Gm–B♭–E♭ as its chord progression. "Silvia" begins as a ballad and transforms into a "psychedelic, danceable" piece as the synth pads accelerate. Wyatt's vocals are echoed and edited with Auto-Tune. Elliott Townsend of URB deemed the singer's vocals "emotionally transparent". The piece lyrically speaks of longing, and Alex Young of Consequence of Sound described it as a "boy-done-wrong ode to the titular woman".

== Reception ==
"Silvia" received positive reviews from music critics; a writer for Complex considered it a "standout" on Miike Snow. Staff reviewer Rudy Klapper of Sputnikmusic deemed it the "undeniable centerpiece" of Miike Snow, "It's the kind of climactic tune that makes everything after it seem lesser." He regarded its placement as the third track on the album as "odd". Similarly, PopMatters critic John Bergstrom also described "Silvia" as the album's centerpiece, referring it to as "stunning". Naming it a "lost Duran Duran classic", Bergstrom wrote, "It's so thrilling, you'll forgive the overzealous Auto-Tune." The single achieved minor commercial success on charts in the United Kingdom. It entered the UK Dance Chart at number 39 in the issue dated 23 January 2010. The following week, it rose to number 32, before acquiring its peak position of number 16 in its third week. "Silvia" spent four weeks on the chart; its last appearance was in the issue dated 13 February 2010 at number 23. The single missed the top 100 of the UK Singles Chart, peaking at number 154 in the issue dated 6 February 2010.

== Music video ==
Marcus Söderlund directed the accompanying music video for "Silvia". It premiered exclusively on NME's website in December 2009. A writer for Complex commented, "The vid is kind of dramatic and hard to make sense of, but what do you expect from a band like this?" The video plays out in a post-apocalyptic world. It begins with the band's three members waking up from sleeping in the middle of a street, appearing to be homeless. The men then walk way in the woods while shots of homeless people are interspersed. Several people are seen carrying torches in the woods and are soon joined by the band. They then set fire to a large wooden version of a jackalope and the video ends as it bursts into flames.

== Formats and track listings ==
- 12" vinyl
1. "Silvia" (Sinden remix) – 5:35
2. "Silvia" (Robotberget remix) – 7:57
3. "Silvia" (Hugg & Pepp remix) – 5:51
4. "Silvia" (Emalkay remix) – 5:02
5. "Silvia" (Felix da Housecat remix) – 5:49
- Digital EP
1. "Silvia" (Hugg & Pepp remix) – 5:51
2. "Silvia" (Robotberget remix) – 7:57
3. "Silvia" (Emalkay remix) – 5:02
4. "Silvia" (Felix da Housecat remix) – 5:49
- Digital iTunes EP
1. "Silvia" (Hugg & Pepp remix) – 5:50
2. "Silvia" (Robotberget remix) – 7:58
3. "Silvia" (Emalkay remix) – 5:02
4. "Silvia" (Felix da Housecat remix) – 5:50
5. "Silvia" (Sinden remix) – 5:35
- Digital download — Sebastian Ingrosso & Dirty South Remix
1. "Silvia" (Sebastian Ingrosso & Dirty South remix) – 7:12

== Credits and personnel ==
- Songwriting – Christian Karlsson, Pontus Winnberg, Andrew Wyatt
- Production – Miike Snow
- Mixing – Anders Hvenare, Miike Snow
- Mastering – Ted Jensen

Credits are adapted from the Miike Snow liner notes.

== Charts ==
Chart (2010)	Peak position
UK Dance (Official Charts)	16
UK Singles (Official Charts Company)	154

== Release history ==
Country	Date	Format	Label
Nordic countries	25 January 2010	Digital download	Columbia Records
United Kingdom	22 January 2010	Digital download	Columbia Records
United Kingdom	8 February 2010	12" vinyl	Columbia Records
