= Animal (Miike Snow song) =

Single by Miike Snow

from the album Miike Snow
- B-side: "Billie Holiday"
- Released: 17 February 2009
- Studio: Robotberget (Stockholm, Sweden)
- Genre: Pop
- Length: 4:24
- Label: Columbia; Downtown
- Songwriters: Christian Karlsson; Pontus Winnberg; Andrew Wyatt; Henrik Jonback
- Producer: Miike Snow

Miike Snow singles chronology
"Animal" (2009)	"Black & Blue" (2009)

"Animal" is a song performed by Swedish indie pop band Miike Snow. It was released as the first single from the band's 2009 self-titled debut album on 17 February 2009 through Columbia and Downtown Records. Written by the band alongside Henrik Jonback, "Animal" is a pop song with instrumentation provided by horns and staccato synthesizers. Lead singer Andrew Wyatt has explained that it has an ambiguous meaning; its lyrics can be interpreted as dealing with matters such as addiction, basic instincts or dissatisfaction when one's needs are not met by society.

Applauding its catchiness and pop sound, critics were positive towards "Animal". Following its release, the single managed to peak at number 50 in Scotland and number 98 on the UK Singles Chart. It was later certified platinum by the Recording Industry Association of America (RIAA). Two music videos were made to promote the release of "Animal"; the first was directed by Sebastian Mlynarski and depicts the band wearing different animal masks, and the second video, directed by Anthony Dickenson, features a mixture of projections, animation and performance footage.

== Background ==
"Animal" was written by Miike Snow's three members, Christian Karlsson, Pontus Winnberg and Andrew Wyatt, in collaboration with Henrik Jonback. In an interview with Dustin Fitzharris of Out, Wyatt explained that the song has an ambiguous meaning, "It can deal with addiction. It can deal with just the basic instincts – some of them are wonderful and some of them are very dangerous." In a separate interview with Joe Zadeh for Clash, Wyatt deemed it a "very simple song" and elaborated on its subject matter, "Directing your attention to man's underlying nature and how sometimes things in society just don't work out to meet your needs. And a lot of people end up feeling very dissatisfied. And the way people feel the need to fit into certain circumstances without even thinking about what they want." "Animal" was recorded at Robotberget, the band's own studio in Stockholm, Sweden. The band produced the track and then mixed it with Anders Hvenare.

Downtown Records first released "Animal" as the band's debut single on 17 February 2009 via digital download in the United States. The record label then sent it for alternative airplay in the country on 12 April 2009. In the United Kingdom, Columbia Records first released the single as a 12" remix vinyl on 27 July 2009. The label later digitally released it on 7 August 2009, and as a CD single on 10 August 2009. The CD and digital releases in the UK include the song "Billie Holiday", written by Karlsson, Winnberg and Wyatt, as a B-side. A digital extended play (EP) with remixes by Crookers, Fake Blood, Fred Falke, Punks Jump Up and Style of Eye was released in European countries on 7 August 2009. Two remixes by Peter Bjorn and John and Mark Ronson were digitally released in the US on 8 December 2009. Ronson's remix also appears on the UK iTunes Store release of the band's next single, "Black & Blue" (2009), and was featured on the soundtrack album of the film Crazy, Stupid, Love (2010).

== Composition ==
"Animal"
A 26-second sample of "Animal", showcasing its chorus and synthesizer instrumentation.

"Animal" is a pop song with horn and staccato synthesizer instrumentation. According to sheet music published at Musicnotes.com by Alfred Publishing, the song is written in the time signature of common time with a moderate beat rate of 118 beats per minute. It is written in the key of E major and Wyatt's vocal range spans the notes of B_{3} to C♯_{6}. It has an E–F♯m_{7}–C♯m chord progression and a verse-chorus structure. Sam Richards of NME and Ben Hogwood of musicOMH compared the sound and rhythm of the song to works by English band The Police, while Paul Lester of The Guardian likened lead singer Wyatt's vocals to those of The Police's lead singer Sting. Jason Lymangrover of AllMusic compared the hook to works by American band Vampire Weekend, and said that "dubby synths circulate around flighty vocals with heavy sentiments". Wyatt sings lyrics such as "But I'm still trying to make my mind up, am I free or am I tied up?" with "unassuming cheeriness", and the chorus contains the line "I change shapes just to hide in this place, but I'm still, I'm still an animal".

== Reception ==
"Animal" received a positive response from music critics. Natalie Kaye of Contactmusic.com described it as a "solid pop song", before adding that the "infectious" chorus is "irrefutably something you'll end up whistling in the shower". Similarly, Ian Wade of BBC Music commented that it "takes approximately one play for its catchiness to cluster bomb your memory bank", and John Bergstrom of PopMatters called it "sharp, catchy pure pop" with a chorus that "charm[s] [its] way into your brain". Rudy Klapper of Sputnikmusic commended lead singer Wyatt's "chameleonic" vocals, calling them "a highlight from the beginning". Klapper concluded, "['Animal'] bounc[es] along a deceptively catchy progression to a jangly chorus that hits immediate pop pay dirt." Neil Ashman of Drowned in Sound commented that it "boasts a number of indelible hooks worked around its staccato synth blasts".

Jordan Bimm of Now described "Animal" as "catchy and creative" and said that the horns and the "playful vocal hook" will appeal to listeners who enjoyed Britney Spears' "Toxic" (2003), a production of Miike Snow members Karlsson and Winnberg. Sam Richards of NME viewed "Animal" as an "impressive piece of sleight of hand" and compared its sound to that of The Police, "while remaining bearable". Ben Hogwood of musicOMH said that it sounds like a "lost Police song given a new, vividly coloured change of clothes". He felt that the lyrical vignettes and hooks seem "awkward" during the first listen, and "gloriously different the next". Hogwood furthermore said that this applied for the album as a whole. Marc Hogan of Pitchfork Media called it a "kiddie-pop lilt".

Commercially, "Animal" was a minor chart success. It made its first chart appearance on 16 August 2009, on the Scottish Singles Chart at number 50. The single also peaked number 98 in the issue dated 22 August 2009 of the UK Singles Chart. "Animal" achieved some airplay in Russia, spending five weeks in the lower ends of the Tophit airplay chart and peaking at number 297. In December 2013, the single was certified platinum by the Recording Industry Association of America (RIAA), the band's first certification, indicating 1,000,000 digital sales.

== Music videos ==
Two music videos were released to promote "Animal". The first video, directed by Sebastian Mlynarski, was released in July 2009. It opens with the band performing on a street at night, holding umbrellas. The band then appears wearing different surgical masks with animal prints throughout the video. Near the end, they are seen performing in a grass field. Anthony Dickenson directed the single's second music video, released in August 2009. Dickenson created projections and sculptures, utilizing both animation and performance footage. The video features projections of a forest which turns into a city as the video progresses. It interspersed with shots of the band performing in a dark room. The video ends with the band's jackalope logo being projected onto the cityscape. The video was nominated in the category Best Visual Effects in a Video at the 2009 UK Music Video Awards.

== Formats and track listings ==
- 12" vinyl
1. "Animal" (Fake Blood remix)
2. "Animal" (Crookers remix)
3. "Animal" (Style of Eye remix)
4. "Animal" (Punks Jump Up remix)
- CD single / digital download
1. "Animal" – 4:24
2. "Billie Holiday" – 4:01
- Digital EP
1. "Animal" (Fake Blood remix) – 5:06
2. "Animal" (Crookers remix) – 3:20
3. "Animal" (Style of Eye remix) – 7:57
4. "Animal" (Punks Jump Up remix) – 5:20
5. "Animal" (Fred Falke remix) – 8:45
- Remixes
1. "Animal" (Peter Bjorn and John remix) – 3:58
2. "Animal" (Mark Ronson remix) – 4:31

== In popular culture ==
- The song is featured in the soundtrack of the video games Saints Row: The Third and Grand Theft Auto: The Ballad of Gay Tony.
- The song was used in the Gossip Girl episode "The Lost Boy", in the ending scene.
- The song was also used in Season 2, Episode 13 of 90210.
- The song was used in the final trailer for the 2019 film The Secret Life of Pets 2.
- The Mark Ronson remix of the song is featured in the 2011 film Crazy, Stupid, Love.
- The Punks Jump Up remix of the song was used as the theme tune to British TV sitcom, Friday Night Dinner.
- The song is featured in the advertisement for the Volvo EX40.

== Credits and personnel ==
- Songwriting – Christian Karlsson, Pontus Winnberg, Andrew Wyatt, Henrik Jonback
- Production – Miike Snow
- Mixing – Anders Hvenare, Miike Snow
- Mastering – Ted Jensen

Credits are adapted from the Miike Snow liner notes.

== Charts ==
Chart (2009)	Peak position
Russia Airplay (Tophit)	297
Scottish Singles Sales (Official Charts)	50
Switzerland Airplay (Schweizer Hitparade)	80
UK Singles (Official Charts)	98

== Certifications ==
Region	Certification	Certified units/sales
United Kingdom (BPI)	Silver	200,000^{‡}
United States (RIAA)	Platinum	1,000,000^{‡}
^{‡} Sales+streaming figures based on certification alone.

== Release history ==
Country	Date	Format	Label
United States	17 February 2009	Digital download	Downtown Records
United States	12 April 2009	Alternative radio	Downtown Records
United Kingdom	27 July 2009	12" vinyl	Columbia Records
United Kingdom	7 August 2009	Digital download	Columbia Records
United Kingdom	10 August 2009	CD single	Columbia Records
