= Miike Snow =

Swedish indie pop band

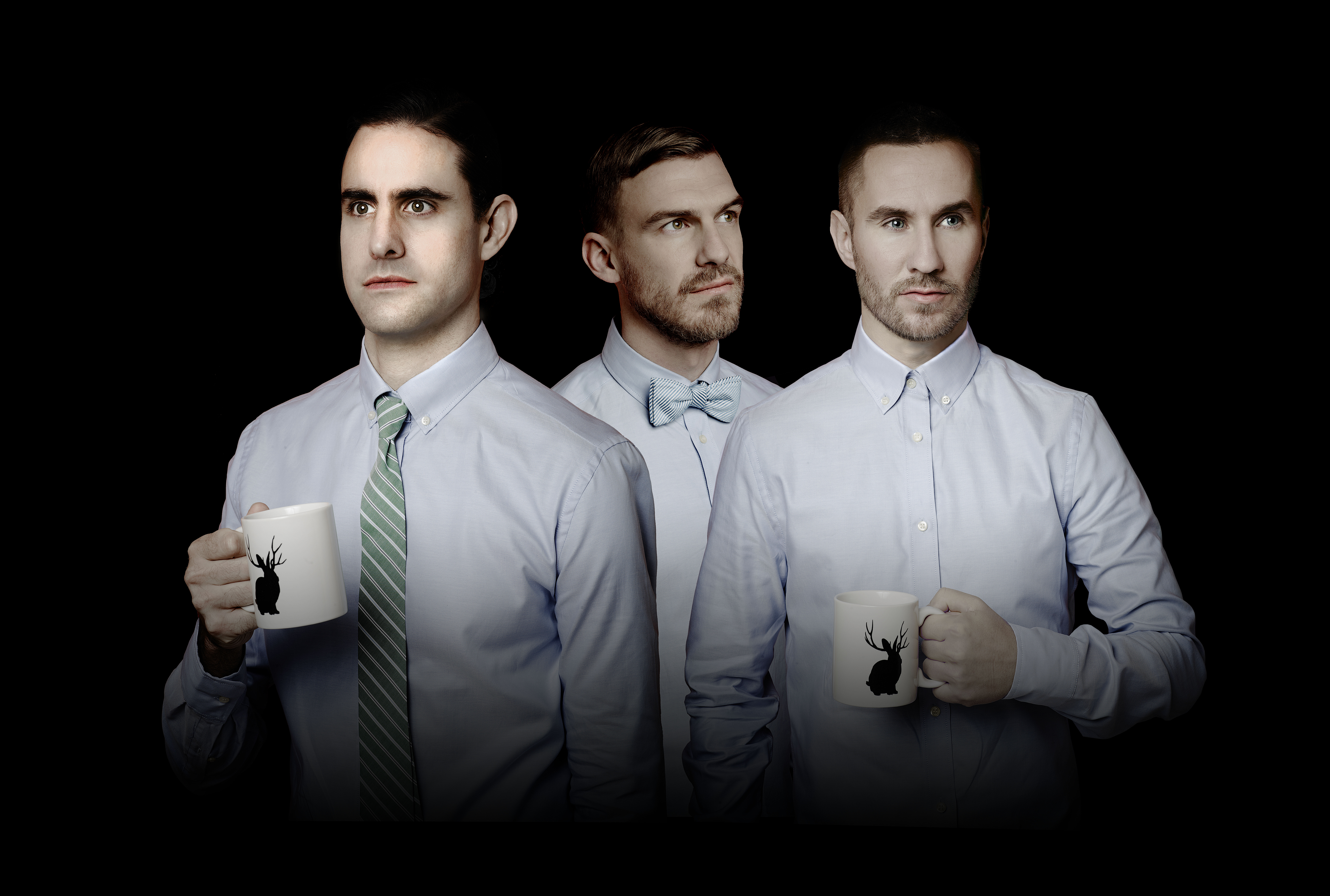
- Miike Snow in 2012

Background information
- Origin: Stockholm, Sweden
- Genres: Indie rock; indie pop; synthpop; indietronica; alternative dance
- Years active: 2007–present
- Labels: Downtown; MapleMusic; Columbia; RCRD LBL
- Members: Christian Karlsson; Pontus Winnberg; Andrew Wyatt
- Website: miikesnow.com

Miike Snow (Note: Pronounced "Mike Snow".) is an indie pop trio formed in Stockholm in 2007, consisting of Swedish production and songwriting duo Bloodshy & Avant (Christian Karlsson and Pontus Winnberg) and American singer Andrew Wyatt. A silhouette of a jackalope is often used as the band's logo. They have released three studio albums: Miike Snow (2009), Happy to You (2012), and iii (2016).

== History ==
=== Early years ===
Miike Snow was formed in Stockholm in 2007. Swedish band members Christian Karlsson and Pontus Winnberg were childhood friends who spent time playing in bands and working on various projects in studios around Gothenburg. Karlsson was a former member of the Swedish hip hop band Goldmine (band), who toured with The Fugees. After they both moved to Stockholm separately, they reunited in 2000 and formed the production and songwriting duo Bloodshy & Avant.

Bloodshy & Avant have enjoyed a significant amount of success as producers and songwriters, working with Madonna, Kylie Minogue, Kelis, and Sky Ferreira, as well as winning the Grammy Award for Best Dance Recording for the Britney Spears song "Toxic". In 2004, while writing an album for Spears, they met American singer and songwriter Andrew Wyatt. He later recalled in 2009, "I was in Sweden visiting, and someone told me that I should hook up with these two guys. Actually, it turns out I'd met Christian in the studio maybe a year before, but we only actually recently remembered that."

The band's name is said to have come from one of their friends, named Mike Snow, and it is thus pronounced like "Mike" and not the Japanese name "Miike". Contrary to some sources, the name is not a reference to Japanese filmmaker Takashi Miike. Despite this, the band members have indicated that they are fans of Miike's films, specifically noting Audition, Visitor Q, 13 Assassins, and Ichi the Killer. Winnberg also name-dropped Miike in an interview whilst explaining that he is not the source of the band's name: "When we sat down to come up with a name, one of us got an email from a mutual friend by the name Mike Snow. We liked it and added the extra 'I' because we liked the look of it. [...] We once found a possible classic Swedish film on our tour bus, called Jävligt Jagad. It's a bit like if Bergman's ancestors would make a movie inspired by Takashi Miike."

=== Miike Snow ===
Miike Snow, the band's eponymous debut album, was recorded in Stockholm and released in Sweden on 22 May 2009. A single for the track "Animal" was released on 17 February 2009. Upon a UK release of the song later in the same year, the track reached number 98 on the UK Singles Chart. The 'Punks Jump Up' remix of "Animal" is used as the theme music for the British Channel 4 sitcom Friday Night Dinner. The second single was "Black & Blue". Both singles have made the BBC Radio 1 Playlist B-List.

The Guardian spoke highly of the band, saying Miike Snow's "coolly emotional pop suggests A-ha meets Animal Collective." In an interview for ClashMusic.com, Wyatt revealed their unexpected popularity, saying, "I don't think our project was that thought out when we started. We just wanted to make music together. Three people just messing about. I don't think we anticipated the level of attention that it's getting right now. We didn't even think about touring when we started the album."

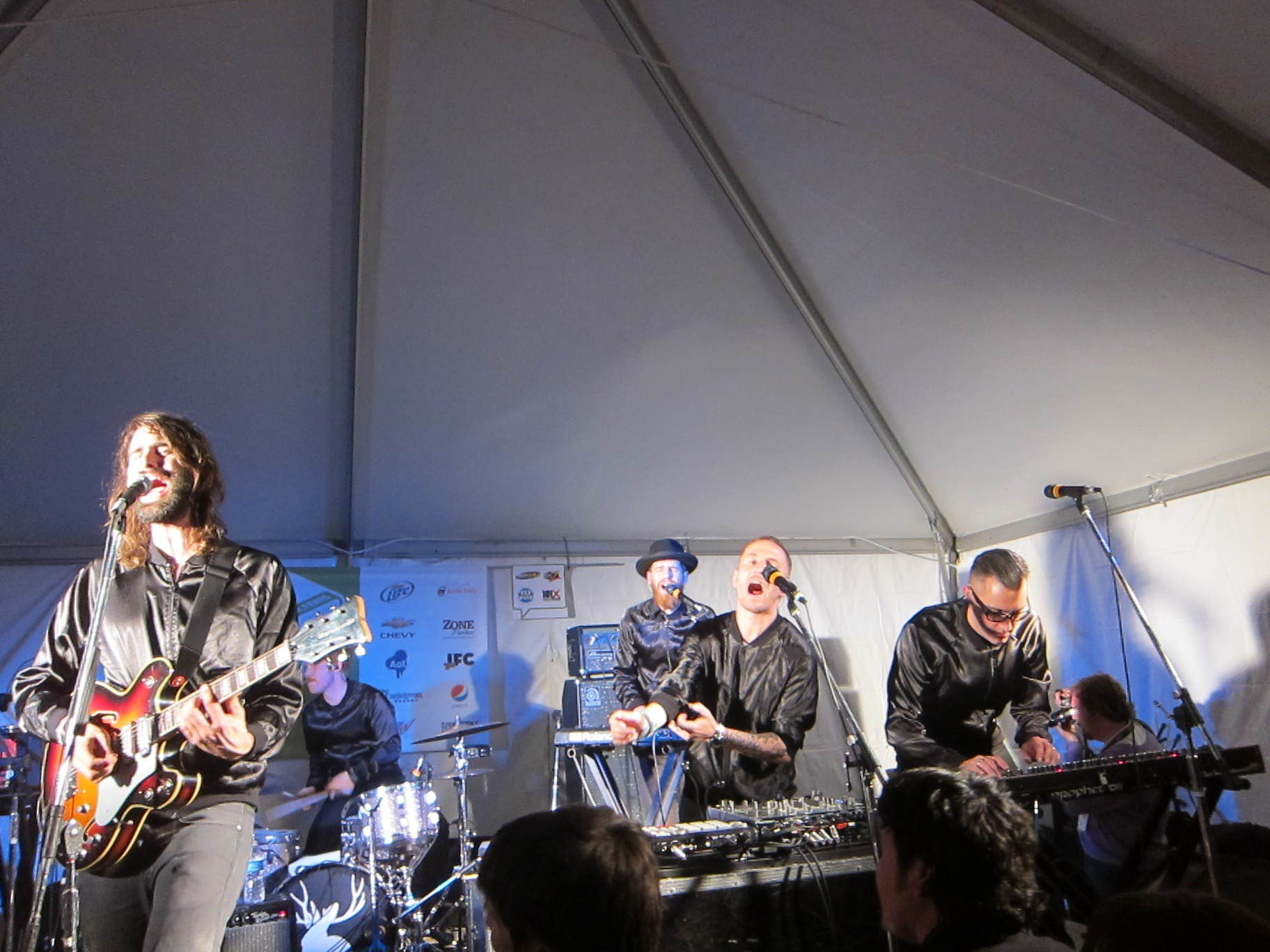
Miike Snow performing at SXSW 2010

Miike Snow have remixed tracks for Depeche Mode, Passion Pit, Peter Bjorn and John, Kings of Leon, I Blame Coco and Vampire Weekend. Their music has been remixed by Mark Ronson, Crookers, Peter Bjorn and John, Treasure Fingers, Tiga, Caspa, Style of Eye, Emalkay, Fake Blood, Benny Blanco, Savage Skulls, Netsky, Hood Internet and DJ Mehdi, amongst others. A remix of the song "Silvia" by DJ's Sebastian Ingrosso and Dirty South was released on 2 April 2010.

Their song "In Search Of" was originally a collaboration with Crookers for the song "Remedy". The band liked the result so much that they decided to create their own version for their album.

In 2011, Miike Snow won a European Border Breakers Award for their international success. Every year the European Border Breakers Awards (EBBA) recognize the success of ten emerging artists or groups who reached audiences outside their own countries with their first internationally released album in the past year.

In 2012, the band toured the United States.

=== Happy to You ===
On 30 May 2011, the band announced on Facebook that they were working on a brand new album to be released in the fall. On 7 October 2011, the band announced on Facebook that they had begun mixing their new album, and that new music would be released by the end of the year. On 29 November 2011, the band announced via Facebook that the album is complete, the videos are being shot, the artwork is being finished, and the tour dates are being planned. On 20 December 2011, the band announced via Facebook that their second full-length album, Happy to You, was set to be released the week of 26 March 2012. They also said that there will be no upcoming information on the track titles, singles. The single "Devil's Work" was made available on Spotify on 15 December 2011.

On 19 January 2012, Radio 1 DJ Zane Lowe premiered "Paddling Out," the first single from their second album. Subsequently, the band released the song online and also announced concert dates for their North American tour. At the same time, the track list and album cover art of Happy to You were revealed via Amazon UK. On 24 January 2012, another song from the album, called "Black Tin Box," a collaboration with Swedish singer Lykke Li, was presented at Pitchfork. On 9 March, Miike Snow visited Annie Mac's BBC Radio 1 show and debuted a new Happy to You song "Bavarian No. 1 (Say You Will)."

"Paddling Out" was released on iTunes on 13 March 2012 and is featured on the FIFA 13 soundtrack, the Forza Horizon soundtrack, and the new UK Budweiser advertisement. On 15 March the video for "The Wave," the second single from Happy to You, was released. It was once again directed by Swedish director Andreas Nillson, who also worked on the video for "Paddling Out." Both videos form together a unified story.

=== iii ===
In 2013, Wyatt confirmed that Miike Snow had been working on their third album. On October 30, 2015, after a three-year hiatus, Miike Snow returned to making music as a cohesive unit. The trio of pop-progressives returned with a new song entitled "Heart Is Full." Premiered by Zane Lowe on his Beats1 program, "Heart Is Full" served as the first single released in support of the third studio album from the group. On December 4, 2015 they released their second single of the album, "Genghis Khan", which was well received by critics. Their third studio album, iii, was officially released on March 4, 2016. On September 26th, 2016, the third-most popular song from the iii album, "The Heart of Me," was featured hit Microsoft Studios (Now Xbox Game Studios), Playground Games, and Turn 10 Studios's newly-released Forza Horizon 3 video game as a frequently used song in the fictional Horizon Pulse radio station in-game.

The band has promoted the album through multiple live performances, including events like SXSW and a concert series for Jimmy Kimmel Live!. In addition, the band has announced tour dates from March 3, 2016 to July 30, 2016. The tour began in New York City and features shows in the United States, Canada and the United Kingdom. The dates also include performances at music festivals, including Coachella, the Governors Ball Music Festival and Lollapalooza, as well as others.

Miike Snow co-headlined at the Grand Sierra Resort and Casino in Reno, Nevada and the Greek Theatre in Berkeley, California with Phantogram in the summer of 2017. They also performed at the 96.5 The Buzz show in June 2017 with Glass Animals. Headline tour dates with Klangstof supporting were added, as well. In 2019, they played an unreleased track titled "I Was a Sailor" live at Just Like Heaven fest at the Queen Mary in Long Beach, California. On November 28, 2023 it was announced that Miike Snow would be performing at the Atlanta-based Shaky Knees festival in 2024. Miike Snow released the single "I Was a Sailor" to streaming services on May 24, 2024. In 2026 the band released the single "Ingrid the Sailor" together with Yttling Jazz.

== Other activities ==
On 30 July 2011, the band announced via Twitter that their new record label, Ingrid, founded by Miike Snow, Peter Bjorn and John, Lykke Li, Coco Morier, and Dungen, was open for business.

== Artistry ==
The silhouette of a jackalope is the logo for Miike Snow

Miike Snow has expressed a preference for not using laptops when recording and playing music. Thus, in 2011, in anticipation for the Happy to You tour, Miike Snow collaborated with the Swedish electronics lab Teenage Engineering and one of the engineers from Elektronmusikstudion (EMS) to create "The Blob," a 9 ft × 9 ft hexagonal synthesiser The Blob has been introduced by vocalist Wyatt as "Part synthesizer, part testosterone, all headache, ladies and gentlemen, we happily bring you a costly device with planned obsolescence written all over it," consisting of digital samplers and old synthesizer parts, some of which were bought from Giorgio Moroder.

Operated by Karlsson and Winnberg and emblazoned with the band's jackalope logo, the Blob has been used on tours, and can be taken apart to facilitate travelling.

== Discography ==
- Miike Snow (2009)
- Happy to You (2012)
- iii (2016)

== Awards ==
- 2016: Berlin Music Video Awards, Best Performer for "Genghis Khan"
