= List of accolades received by Barbie (film) =

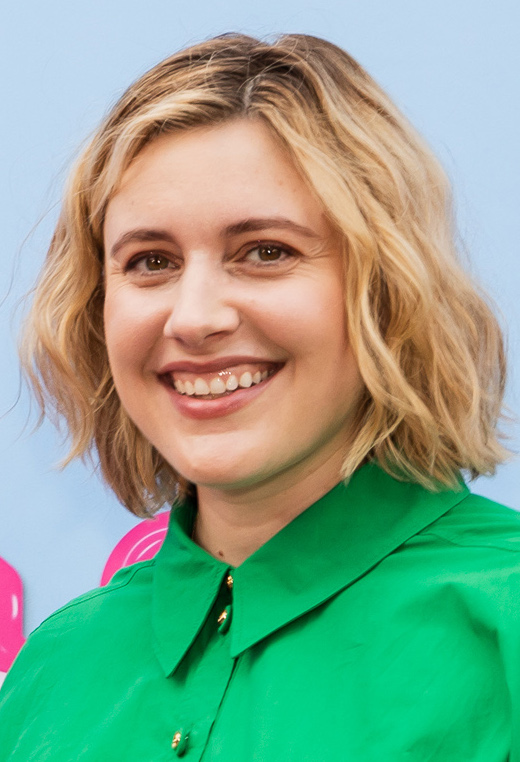
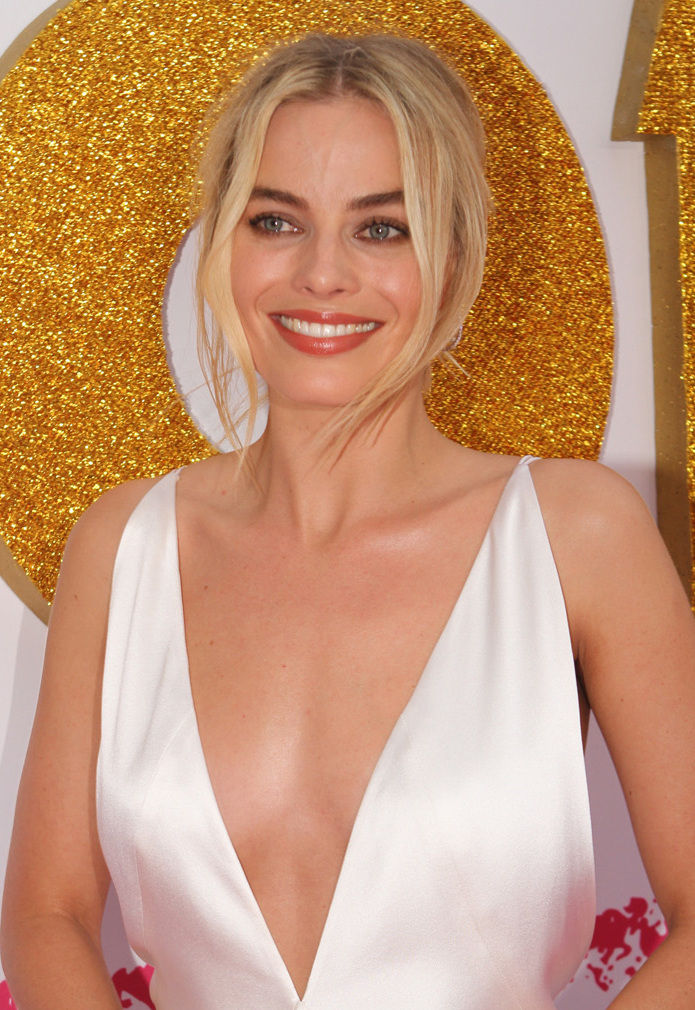
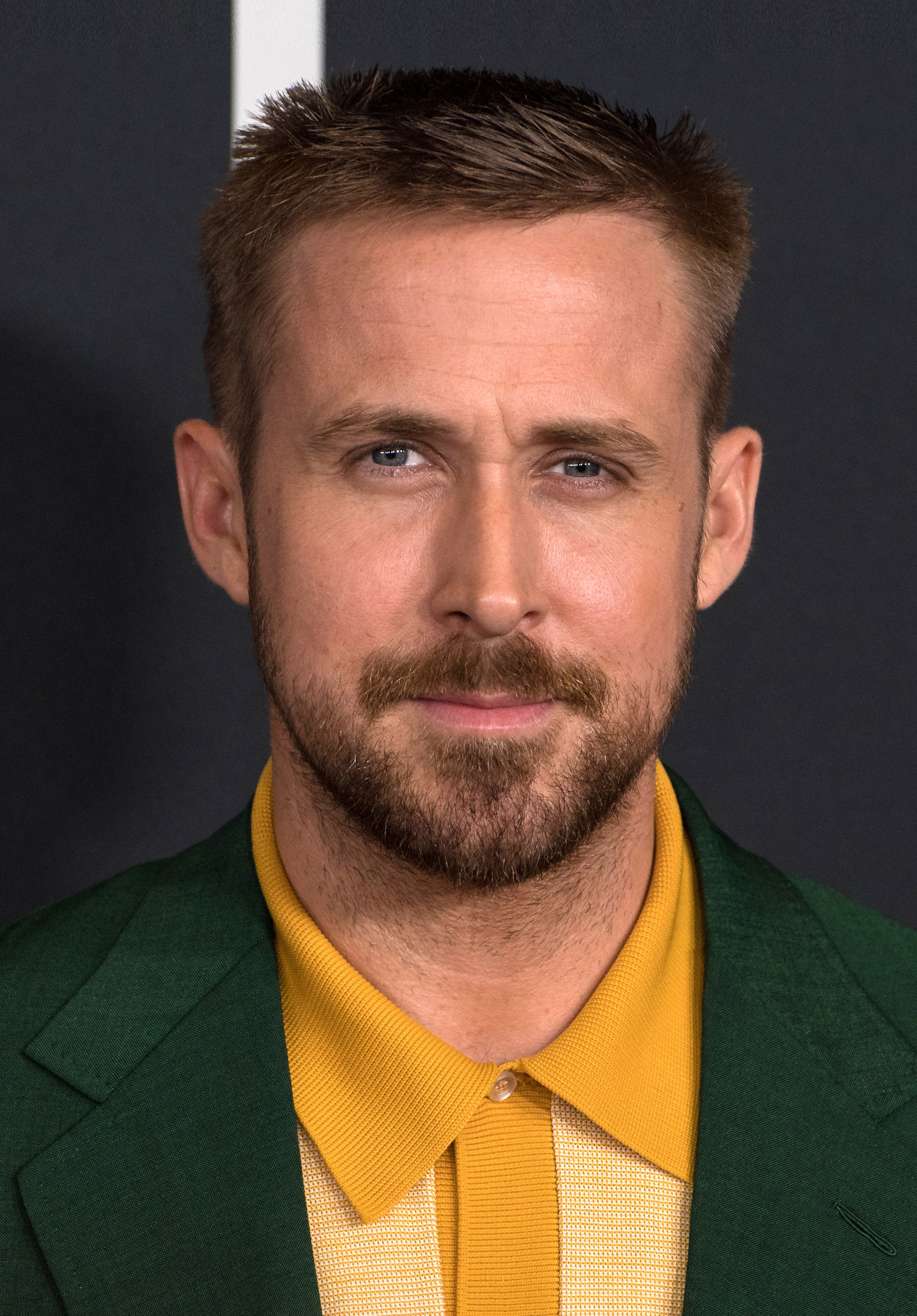
- Greta Gerwig received various accolades for her direction and screenplay, as did Margot Robbie and Ryan Gosling for their performances as Barbie and Ken.
Awards and nominations
Award	Wins	Nominations
AACTA International Awards	3	5
AARP Movies for Grownups Awards	1	2
Academy Awards	1	8
ADG Excellence in Production Design Awards	0	1
Alliance of Women Film Journalists	4	9
American Film Institute Awards	1	1
American Cinema Editors Eddie Awards	0	1
Astra Film and Creative Awards	8	15
Austin Film Critics Association	1	8
BET Awards	0	2
Billboard Music Awards	1	1
Bodil Awards	0	1
Boston Society of Film Critics	1	1
Brit Awards	0	2
British Academy Film Awards	0	5
Capri Hollywood International Film Festival	6	6
Celebration of Cinema & Television	1	1
Chicago Film Critics Association	1	9
Chita Rivera Awards	1	1
Cinema Audio Society Awards	0	1
Cinema for Peace Awards	0	1
Costume Designers Guild Awards	1	1
Critics' Choice Movie Awards	6	18
Dallas–Fort Worth Film Critics Association	1	1
Directors Guild of America Awards	0	1
Dorian Awards	2	8
Dublin Film Critics' Circle	3	3
Florida Film Critics Circle	0	2
Georgia Film Critics Association	4	8
Golden Globe Awards	2	9
Golden Reel Awards	0	2
Golden Trailer Awards	1	1
Gotham Awards	1	2
Grammy Awards	3	12
Guild of Music Supervisors Awards	2	3
Hollywood Music in Media Awards	2	5
iHeartRadio Music Awards	0	4
International Cinephile Society	0	1
International Film Music Critics Association	0	1
Japan Academy Film Prize	0	1
London Film Critics' Circle	0	5
Los Angeles Film Critics Association	4	4
Make-Up Artists and Hair Stylists Guild	1	2
MTV Video Music Awards	1	6
National Board of Review	2	2
National Society of Film Critics	1	1
New York Film Critics Online	1	1
Nickelodeon Kids' Choice Awards	4	8
Nikkan Sports Film Awards	1	1
Online Film Critics Society	4	9
Palm Springs International Film Festival	2	2
People's Choice Awards	6	10
Producers Guild of America Awards	0	1
Robert Awards	0	1
San Diego Film Critics Society	5	12
San Francisco Bay Area Film Critics Circle	1	6
Satellite Awards	2	11
Saturn Awards	3	8
Screen Actors Guild Awards	0	4
St. Louis Film Critics Association	12	12
Toronto Film Critics Association	2	2
Vancouver Film Critics Circle	1	1
Washington D.C. Area Film Critics Association	1	10
Women Film Critics Circle Awards	2	4
World Soundtrack Awards	1	3
Writers Guild of America Awards	0	1

Totals (Note: Certain award groups do not simply award one winner. They acknowledge several different recipients, have runners-up, and have third place. Since this is a specific recognition and is different from losing an award, runner-up mentions are considered wins in this award tally. For simplification and to avoid errors, each award in this list has been presumed to have had a prior nomination.)
- Wins: 122
- Nominations: 303

Barbie (Note: Also known in promotional material as Barbie The Movie) is a 2023 fantasy comedy film directed by Greta Gerwig from a screenplay she wrote with Noah Baumbach. It is the first live-action film based on the eponymous fashion dolls by Mattel, following numerous animated films and specials. The film stars Margot Robbie as the titular character and Ryan Gosling as Ken, and follows the duo on a journey of self-discovery after the former experiences an existential crisis; Robbie also serves as one of the film's producers. The ensemble supporting cast includes America Ferrera, Kate McKinnon, Issa Rae, Rhea Perlman, and Will Ferrell.

Barbie had its world premiere at the Shrine Auditorium in Los Angeles on July 9, 2023, followed by its European premiere at Empire Leicester Square in London on July 12. The film was released theatrically in the United States, the United Kingdom, and most other territories on July 21 through Warner Bros. Pictures. Its concurrent release with Universal Pictures's Oppenheimer was the catalyst for the "Barbenheimer" phenomenon, encouraging audiences to see both films as a double feature. Produced on a budget of $128–145 million, Barbie grossed $1.447 billion worldwide. It became the highest-grossing film of 2023, the highest-grossing comedy film of all time, the highest-grossing film by a solo female director (and the first to cross the $1 billion mark), and the highest-grossing release in Warner Bros. Pictures history. Barbie received widespread critical acclaim, with particular praise towards its direction, screenplay, cast performances, cinematography, costume design, production design, and music. On the review aggregator website Rotten Tomatoes, the film holds an approval rating of 88% based on 507 reviews.

Barbie garnered awards and nominations in a wide assortment of categories, with recognition for its direction, screenplay, performances, music, and production values. At the 96th Academy Awards, the film received eight nominations including Best Picture, winning Best Original Song for Billie Eilish's "What Was I Made For?", making Eilish the youngest person in history to ever win a second Academy Award in any category (due to her previous win in the same category for James Bond's film No Time To Die's theme song of the same name). Its accompanying soundtrack album and score were further recognized at the 66th Annual Grammy Awards, earning twelve nominations and winning in three categories, including Song of the Year (for "What Was I Made For?"), marking it as the first time for any film to win in this category since Titanic for Celine Dion's "My Heart Will Go On". Barbie received a leading nine nominations at the 81st Golden Globe Awards, including Best Motion Picture – Musical or Comedy, and won the inaugural Cinematic and Box Office Achievement award. At the 29th Critics' Choice Awards, Barbie's eighteen nominations (leading to six award wins) were the most for any film in the organization's history. The film also received five nominations at the 77th British Academy Film Awards. Both the National Board of Review and the American Film Institute named Barbie one of the Top Ten Films of 2023. It received 24 nominations from the Online Film and Television Association awards, the most nominations ever for a film from those awards.

== Selected Accolades ==
Barbie accolades
Award	Date of ceremony	Category	Nominee(s)	Result	Ref(s).
AACTA International Awards	February 10, 2024	Best Film	Barbie	Won	
AACTA International Awards	February 10, 2024	Best Direction in Film	Greta Gerwig	Nominated	
AACTA International Awards	February 10, 2024	Best Lead Actress in Film	Margot Robbie	Won	
AACTA International Awards	February 10, 2024	Best Supporting Actor in Film	Ryan Gosling	Won	
AACTA International Awards	February 10, 2024	Best Screenplay in Film	Greta Gerwig and Noah Baumbach	Nominated	
AARP Movies for Grownups Awards	January 17, 2024	Best Picture/Best Movie for Grownups	Barbie	Nominated	
AARP Movies for Grownups Awards	January 17, 2024	Best Screenwriter	Greta Gerwig and Noah Baumbach	Won	
Academy Awards	March 10, 2024	Best Picture	David Heyman, Margot Robbie, Tom Ackerley, and Robbie Brenner	Nominated	
Academy Awards	March 10, 2024	Best Supporting Actor	Ryan Gosling	Nominated	
Academy Awards	March 10, 2024	Best Supporting Actress	America Ferrera	Nominated	
Academy Awards	March 10, 2024	Best Adapted Screenplay	Greta Gerwig and Noah Baumbach	Nominated	
Academy Awards	March 10, 2024	Best Costume Design	Jacqueline Durran	Nominated	
Academy Awards	March 10, 2024	Best Original Song	"I'm Just Ken" (Mark Ronson and Andrew Wyatt)	Nominated	
Academy Awards	March 10, 2024	Best Original Song	"What Was I Made For?" (Billie Eilish and Finneas O'Connell)	Won	
Academy Awards	March 10, 2024	Best Production Design	Sarah Greenwood and Katie Spencer	Nominated	
ADG Excellence in Production Design Awards	February 10, 2024	Excellence in Production Design for a Fantasy Film	Sarah Greenwood	Nominated	
Alliance of Women Film Journalists	January 4, 2024	Best Film	Barbie	Nominated	
Alliance of Women Film Journalists	January 4, 2024	Best Director	Greta Gerwig	Won	
Alliance of Women Film Journalists	January 4, 2024	Best Woman Director	Greta Gerwig	Nominated	
Alliance of Women Film Journalists	January 4, 2024	Best Woman Screenwriter	Greta Gerwig	Nominated	
Alliance of Women Film Journalists	January 4, 2024	Best Actress	Margot Robbie	Nominated	
Alliance of Women Film Journalists	January 4, 2024	Best Actor in a Supporting Role	Ryan Gosling	Won	
Alliance of Women Film Journalists	January 4, 2024	Best Actress in a Supporting Role	America Ferrera	Nominated	
Alliance of Women Film Journalists	January 4, 2024	Best Screenplay, Original	Greta Gerwig and Noah Baumbach	Won	
Alliance of Women Film Journalists	January 4, 2024	Best Ensemble Cast – Casting Director	Lucy Bevan and Allison Jones	Won	
American Cinema Editors Eddie Awards	March 3, 2024	Best Edited Feature Film – Comedy	Nick Houy	Nominated	
American Film Institute Awards	December 7, 2023	Top 10 Films of the Year	Barbie	Won (Note: This award does not have a single winner, but recognizes multiple films.)	
Artios Awards	March 7, 2024	The Zeitgeist Award	Lucy Bevan and Olivia Grant (Associate Casting Director)	Won	
Astra Awards	January 6, 2024	Best Picture	Barbie	Won	
Astra Awards	January 6, 2024	Best Director	Greta Gerwig	Nominated	
Astra Awards	January 6, 2024	Best Original Screenplay	Greta Gerwig and Noah Baumbach	Won	
Astra Awards	January 6, 2024	Best Actress	Margot Robbie	Won (Note: Tied with Lily Gladstone for Killers of the Flower Moon)	
Astra Awards	January 6, 2024	Best Supporting Actress	America Ferrera	Nominated	
Astra Awards	January 6, 2024	Best Supporting Actor	Ryan Gosling	Won	
Astra Awards	January 6, 2024	Best Cast Ensemble	Barbie	Nominated	
Astra Awards	February 26, 2024	Best Casting Director	Allison Jones and Lucy Bevan	Won	
Astra Awards	February 26, 2024	Best Costume Design	Jacqueline Durran	Nominated	
Astra Awards	February 26, 2024	Best Production Design	Sarah Greenwood and Katie Spencer	Won	
Astra Awards	February 26, 2024	Best Hair and Make-Up	Ivana Primorac	Nominated	
Astra Awards	February 26, 2024	Best Original Song	"Dance the Night" by Mark Ronson, Andrew Wyatt, Dua Lipa, and Caroline Ailin	Nominated	
Astra Awards	February 26, 2024	Best Original Song	"I'm Just Ken" by Mark Ronson and Andrew Wyatt	Won	
Astra Awards	February 26, 2024	Best Original Song	"What Was I Made For?" by Billie Eilish and Finneas O'Connell	Nominated	
Astra Awards	February 26, 2024	Best Publicity Campaign	Barbie	Won	
Austin Film Critics Association	January 10, 2024	Best Film	Barbie	9th Place	
Austin Film Critics Association	January 10, 2024	Best Director	Greta Gerwig	Nominated	
Austin Film Critics Association	January 10, 2024	Best Actress	Margot Robbie	Nominated	
Austin Film Critics Association	January 10, 2024	Best Supporting Actor	Ryan Gosling	Nominated	
Austin Film Critics Association	January 10, 2024	Best Original Screenplay	Greta Gerwig and Noah Baumbach	Nominated	
Austin Film Critics Association	January 10, 2024	Best Cinematography	Rodrigo Prieto	Nominated	
Austin Film Critics Association	January 10, 2024	Best Original Score	Mark Ronson and Andrew Wyatt	Nominated	
Austin Film Critics Association	January 10, 2024	Best Ensemble	Barbie	Nominated	
BET Awards	June 30, 2024	Video of the Year	"Barbie World" – Nicki Minaj & Ice Spice with Aqua	Nominated	
BET Awards	June 30, 2024	Best Collaboration	"Barbie World" – Nicki Minaj & Ice Spice with Aqua	Nominated	
Billboard Music Awards	November 19, 2023	Top Soundtrack	Barbie the Album	Won	
Bodil Awards	March 18, 2024	Best English-Language Film	Barbie	Nominated	
Boston Society of Film Critics Awards	December 10, 2023	Best Supporting Actor	Ryan Gosling	Won	
Brit Awards	March 2, 2024	Song of the Year	"Dance the Night" – Dua Lipa	Nominated	
Brit Awards	March 2, 2024	International Song of the Year	"What Was I Made For?" – Billie Eilish	Nominated	
British Academy Film Awards	February 18, 2024	Best Actress in a Leading Role	Margot Robbie	Nominated	
British Academy Film Awards	February 18, 2024	Best Actor in a Supporting Role	Ryan Gosling	Nominated	
British Academy Film Awards	February 18, 2024	Best Original Screenplay	Greta Gerwig and Noah Baumbach	Nominated	
British Academy Film Awards	February 18, 2024	Best Costume Design	Jacqueline Durran	Nominated	
British Academy Film Awards	February 18, 2024	Best Production Design	Sarah Greenwood and Katie Spencer	Nominated	
Capri Hollywood International Film Festival	January 2, 2024	Lina Wertmuller Award	Greta Gerwig	Won	
Capri Hollywood International Film Festival	January 2, 2024	Best Supporting Actor	Ryan Gosling	Won	
Capri Hollywood International Film Festival	January 2, 2024	Best Original Screenplay	Greta Gerwig and Noah Baumbach	Won	
Capri Hollywood International Film Festival	January 2, 2024	Best Costume Design	Jacqueline Durran	Won	
Capri Hollywood International Film Festival	January 2, 2024	Best Original Song	"Dance the Night"	Won	
Capri Hollywood International Film Festival	January 2, 2024	Best Production Design	Sarah Greenwood and Katie Spencer	Won	
Celebration of Cinema & Television	December 4, 2023	Groundbreaker Award	America Ferrera (Note: Also for Dumb Money (2023))	Won	
Chicago Film Critics Association Awards	December 12, 2023	Best Film	Barbie	Nominated	
Chicago Film Critics Association Awards	December 12, 2023	Best Director	Greta Gerwig	Nominated	
Chicago Film Critics Association Awards	December 12, 2023	Best Original Screenplay	Greta Gerwig and Noah Baumbach	Nominated	
Chicago Film Critics Association Awards	December 12, 2023	Best Actress	Margot Robbie	Nominated	
Chicago Film Critics Association Awards	December 12, 2023	Best Supporting Actor	Ryan Gosling	Nominated	
Chicago Film Critics Association Awards	December 12, 2023	Best Original Score	Mark Ronson and Andrew Wyatt	Nominated	
Chicago Film Critics Association Awards	December 12, 2023	Best Costume Design	Jacqueline Durran	Nominated	
Chicago Film Critics Association Awards	December 12, 2023	Best Art Direction/Production Design	Barbie	Won	
Chicago Film Critics Association Awards	December 12, 2023	Best Use of Visual Effects	Barbie	Nominated	
Chita Rivera Awards	May 20, 2024	Outstanding Choreography in a Theatrical Release	Jennifer White	Won	
Cinema Audio Society Awards	March 2, 2024	Outstanding Achievement in Sound Mixing for Motion Picture – Live Action	Nina Rice, Kevin O'Connell, Ai-Ling Lee, Peter Cobbin, Kirsty Whalley, Bobby Johanson, and Kevin Schultz	Nominated	
Cinema for Peace Awards	February 18–19, 2024	The Most Valuable Film of the Year 2024	Barbie	Nominated	
Costume Designers Guild Awards	February 21, 2024	Excellence in Sci-Fi/Fantasy Film	Jacqueline Durran	Won	
Critics' Choice Movie Awards	January 14, 2024	Best Picture	Barbie	Nominated	
Critics' Choice Movie Awards	January 14, 2024	Best Director	Greta Gerwig	Nominated	
Critics' Choice Movie Awards	January 14, 2024	Best Actress	Margot Robbie	Nominated	
Critics' Choice Movie Awards	January 14, 2024	Best Supporting Actor	Ryan Gosling	Nominated	
Critics' Choice Movie Awards	January 14, 2024	Best Supporting Actress	America Ferrera	Nominated	
Critics' Choice Movie Awards	January 14, 2024	Best Young Actor/Actress	Ariana Greenblatt	Nominated	
Critics' Choice Movie Awards	January 14, 2024	Best Acting Ensemble	Barbie	Nominated	
Critics' Choice Movie Awards	January 14, 2024	Best Original Screenplay	Greta Gerwig and Noah Baumbach	Won	
Critics' Choice Movie Awards	January 14, 2024	Best Cinematography	Rodrigo Prieto	Nominated	
Critics' Choice Movie Awards	January 14, 2024	Best Editing	Nick Houy	Nominated	
Critics' Choice Movie Awards	January 14, 2024	Best Costume Design	Jacqueline Durran	Won	
Critics' Choice Movie Awards	January 14, 2024	Best Production Design	Sarah Greenwood and Katie Spencer	Won	
Critics' Choice Movie Awards	January 14, 2024	Best Score	Mark Ronson and Andrew Wyatt	Nominated	
Critics' Choice Movie Awards	January 14, 2024	Best Song	"Dance the Night"	Nominated	
Critics' Choice Movie Awards	January 14, 2024	Best Song	"I'm Just Ken"	Won	
Critics' Choice Movie Awards	January 14, 2024	Best Song	"What Was I Made For?"	Nominated	
Critics' Choice Movie Awards	January 14, 2024	Best Hair and Makeup	Barbie	Won	
Critics' Choice Movie Awards	January 14, 2024	Best Comedy	Barbie	Won	
Dallas–Fort Worth Film Critics Association	December 18, 2023	Top 10 Films of the Year	Barbie	9th Place	
Directors Guild of America Awards	February 10, 2024	Outstanding Directorial Achievement in Motion Pictures	Greta Gerwig	Nominated	
Dorian Awards	February 26, 2024	Film of the Year	Barbie	Nominated	
Dorian Awards	February 26, 2024	Director of the Year	Greta Gerwig	Won	
Dorian Awards	February 26, 2024	Supporting Film Performance of the Year	Ryan Gosling	Nominated	
Dorian Awards	February 26, 2024	Screenplay of the Year	Greta Gerwig and Noah Baumbach	Nominated	
Dorian Awards	February 26, 2024	Film Music of the Year	Mark Ronson and Andrew Wyatt	Won	
Dorian Awards	February 26, 2024	Visually Striking Film of the Year	Barbie	Nominated	
Dorian Awards	February 26, 2024	Campiest Flick	Barbie	Nominated	
Dorian Awards	February 26, 2024	Wilde Artist Award - To a truly groundbreaking force in entertainment	Greta Gerwig	Nominated	
Dublin Film Critics Circle Awards	December 19, 2023	Best Film	Barbie	7th Place	
Dublin Film Critics Circle Awards	December 19, 2023	Best Director	Greta Gerwig	7th Place	
Dublin Film Critics Circle Awards	December 19, 2023	Best Actor	Ryan Gosling	10th Place	
Florida Film Critics Circle	December 21, 2023	Best Ensemble	Barbie	Nominated	
Florida Film Critics Circle	December 21, 2023	Best Art Direction and Production Design	Barbie	Nominated	
Georgia Film Critics Association Awards	January 5, 2024	Best Picture	Barbie	Nominated	
Georgia Film Critics Association Awards	January 5, 2024	Best Director	Greta Gerwig	Runner-up	
Georgia Film Critics Association Awards	January 5, 2024	Best Supporting Actor	Ryan Gosling	Nominated	
Georgia Film Critics Association Awards	January 5, 2024	Best Original Screenplay	Greta Gerwig and Noah Baumbach	Nominated	
Georgia Film Critics Association Awards	January 5, 2024	Best Production Design	Sarah Greenwood and Katie Spencer	Won	
Georgia Film Critics Association Awards	January 5, 2024	Best Original Song	"What Was I Made For?"	Won	
Georgia Film Critics Association Awards	January 5, 2024	Best Original Song	"I'm Just Ken"	Runner-up	
Georgia Film Critics Association Awards	January 5, 2024	Best Ensemble	Barbie	Nominated	
Golden Globe Awards	January 7, 2024	Best Motion Picture – Musical or Comedy	Barbie	Nominated	
Golden Globe Awards	January 7, 2024	Cinematic and Box Office Achievement	Barbie	Won	
Golden Globe Awards	January 7, 2024	Best Actress in a Motion Picture – Musical or Comedy	Margot Robbie	Nominated	
Golden Globe Awards	January 7, 2024	Best Supporting Actor – Motion Picture	Ryan Gosling	Nominated	
Golden Globe Awards	January 7, 2024	Best Director	Greta Gerwig	Nominated	
Golden Globe Awards	January 7, 2024	Best Screenplay	Greta Gerwig and Noah Baumbach	Nominated	
Golden Globe Awards	January 7, 2024	Best Original Song	"Dance the Night" – Mark Ronson, Andrew Wyatt, Dua Lipa, and Caroline Ailin	Nominated	
Golden Globe Awards	January 7, 2024	Best Original Song	"I'm Just Ken" – Mark Ronson and Andrew Wyatt	Nominated	
Golden Globe Awards	January 7, 2024	Best Original Song	"What Was I Made For?" – Billie Eilish O'Connell and Finneas O'Connell	Won	
Golden Reel Awards	March 3, 2024	Outstanding Achievement in Sound Editing – Feature Dialogue / ADR	Ai-Ling Lee, Dan Kenyon, Brian Bowles, Kate Bilinski, Tony Martinez, and Tyler Newhouse	Nominated	
Golden Reel Awards	March 3, 2024	Outstanding Achievement in Music Editing – Feature Motion Picture	Suzana Perić and Mick Gormaley	Nominated	
Golden Trailer Awards	June 29, 2023	Best Teaser	Barbie teaser	Won	
Gotham Independent Film Awards	November 27, 2023	Outstanding Supporting Performance	Ryan Gosling	Nominated	
Gotham Independent Film Awards	November 27, 2023	Global Icon & Creator Tribute	Barbie	Won	
Grammy Awards	February 4, 2024	Record of the Year	"What Was I Made For?" – Billie Eilish, Finneas O'Connell, Rob Kinelski, and Chris Gehringer	Nominated	
Grammy Awards	February 4, 2024	Song of the Year	"Dance the Night" – Caroline Ailin, Dua Lipa, Mark Ronson, and Andrew Wyatt	Nominated	
Grammy Awards	February 4, 2024	Song of the Year	"What Was I Made For?" – Billie Eilish O'Connell and Finneas O'Connell	Won	
Grammy Awards	February 4, 2024	Best Pop Solo Performance	"What Was I Made For?" – Billie Eilish	Nominated	
Grammy Awards	February 4, 2024	Best Rap Song	"Barbie World" – Isis Naija Gaston, Ephrem Louis Lopez Jr., and Onika Maraj	Nominated	
Grammy Awards	February 4, 2024	Best Compilation Soundtrack for Visual Media	Barbie the Album – Various Artists	Won	
Grammy Awards	February 4, 2024	Best Score Soundtrack Album for Visual Media	Barbie – Mark Ronson and Andrew Wyatt	Nominated	
Grammy Awards	February 4, 2024	Best Song Written for Visual Media	"Barbie World" – Isis Naija Gaston, Ephrem Louis Lopez Jr., and Onika Maraj	Nominated	
Grammy Awards	February 4, 2024	Best Song Written for Visual Media	"Dance the Night" – Caroline Ailin, Dua Lipa, Mark Ronson, and Andrew Wyatt	Nominated	
Grammy Awards	February 4, 2024	Best Song Written for Visual Media	"I'm Just Ken" – Mark Ronson and Andrew Wyatt	Nominated	
Grammy Awards	February 4, 2024	Best Song Written for Visual Media	"What Was I Made For?" – Billie Eilish O’Connell and Finneas O'Connell	Won	
Grammy Awards	February 4, 2024	Best Music Video	"What Was I Made For?" – Billie Eilish, Michelle An, Chelsea Dodson, and David Moore	Nominated	
Guild of Music Supervisors Awards	March 3, 2024	Best Music Supervision for Films Budgeted Over $25 Million	George Drakoulias	Won	
Guild of Music Supervisors Awards	March 3, 2024	Best Song Written and/or Recording Created for a Film	"I'm Just Ken" – Mark Ronson, Andrew Wyatt, Ryan Gosling, and George Drakoulias	Nominated	
Guild of Music Supervisors Awards	March 3, 2024	Best Song Written and/or Recording Created for a Film	"What Was I Made For?" – Billie Eilish O'Connell, Finneas O'Connell, and George Drakoulias	Won	
Hollywood Music in Media Awards	November 15, 2023	Best Original Score – Sci-Fi/Fantasy Film	Mark Ronson and Andrew Wyatt	Nominated	
Hollywood Music in Media Awards	November 15, 2023	Best Original Song – Feature Film	"I'm Just Ken" – Mark Ronson and Andrew Wyatt	Nominated	
Hollywood Music in Media Awards	November 15, 2023	Best Original Song – Feature Film	"What Was I Made For?" – Billie Eilish O'Connell and Finneas O'Connell	Won	
Hollywood Music in Media Awards	November 15, 2023	Best Song – Onscreen Performance (Film)	"I'm Just Ken" – Ryan Gosling	Nominated	
Hollywood Music in Media Awards	November 15, 2023	Best Soundtrack Album	Barbie	Won	
Houston Film Critics Society	January 22, 2024	Best Picture	Barbie	Nominated	
Houston Film Critics Society	January 22, 2024	Best Director	Greta Gerwig	Nominated	
Houston Film Critics Society	January 22, 2024	Best Actress	Margot Robbie	Nominated	
Houston Film Critics Society	January 22, 2024	Best Supporting Actor	Ryan Gosling	Won	
Houston Film Critics Society	January 22, 2024	Best Ensemble Cast	Barbie	Nominated	
Houston Film Critics Society	January 22, 2024	Best Screenplay	Greta Gerwig and Noah Baumbach	Nominated	
Houston Film Critics Society	January 22, 2024	Best Cinematography	Rodrigo Prieto	Nominated	
Houston Film Critics Society	January 22, 2024	Best Original Song	"Dance the Night"	Nominated	
Houston Film Critics Society	January 22, 2024	Best Original Song	"I'm Just Ken"	Won	
Houston Film Critics Society	January 22, 2024	Best Original Song	"What Was I Made For?"	Nominated	
Hugo Awards	August 11, 2024	Best Dramatic Presentation – Long Form	Greta Gerwig and Noah Baumbach	Nominated	
iHeartRadio Music Awards	April 1, 2024	Song of the Year	"Dance the Night" – Dua Lipa	Nominated	
iHeartRadio Music Awards	April 1, 2024	Best Collaboration	"Barbie World" – Nicki Minaj & Ice Spice featuring Aqua	Nominated	
iHeartRadio Music Awards	April 1, 2024	Best Lyrics	"What Was I Made For?" – Billie Eilish	Nominated	
iHeartRadio Music Awards	April 1, 2024	Best Music Video	"Dance the Night" – Dua Lipa	Nominated	
iHeartRadio Music Awards	April 1, 2024	Best Music Video	"What Was I Made For?" – Billie Eilish	Nominated	
iHeartRadio Music Awards	April 1, 2024	TikTok Bop of the Year	"What Was I Made For?" – Billie Eilish	Nominated	
International Cinephile Society	February 11, 2024	Best Production Design	Sarah Greenwood and Katie Spencer	Nominated	
International Film Music Critics Association	February 22, 2024	Best Original Score for a Comedy Film	Mark Ronson and Andrew Wyatt	Nominated	
Japan Academy Film Prize	March 8, 2024	Outstanding Foreign Language Film	Barbie	Nominated	
London Film Critics' Circle	February 4, 2024	Film of the Year	Barbie	Nominated	
London Film Critics' Circle	February 4, 2024	Director of the Year	Greta Gerwig	Nominated	
London Film Critics' Circle	February 4, 2024	Screenwriter of the Year	Greta Gerwig and Noah Baumbach	Nominated	
London Film Critics' Circle	February 4, 2024	Supporting Actor of the Year	Ryan Gosling	Nominated	
London Film Critics' Circle	February 4, 2024	Technical Achievement Award	Sarah Greenwood (production design)	Nominated	
Los Angeles Film Critics Association	December 10, 2023	Best Supporting Actor	Ryan Gosling	Runner-up (Note: Tied with Lily Gladstone for Killers of the Flower Moon (2023))	
Los Angeles Film Critics Association	December 10, 2023	Best Production Design	Sarah Greenwood	Won	
Los Angeles Film Critics Association	December 10, 2023	Best Music	Mark Ronson and Andrew Wyatt	Runner-up	
Los Angeles Film Critics Association	December 10, 2023	Best Cinematography	Rodrigo Prieto	Runner-up (Note: Also for Killers of the Flower Moon (2023))	
Make-Up Artists and Hair Stylists Guild	February 18, 2024	Best Period and/or Character Make-Up	Ivana Primorac, Victoria Down, and Maha Mimo	Nominated	
Make-Up Artists and Hair Stylists Guild	February 18, 2024	Best Period Hair Styling and/or Character Hair Styling	Ivana Primorac, Marie Larkin, and Clare Corsick	Won	
MTV Video Music Awards	September 12, 2023	Best Pop	"Dance the Night" – Dua Lipa	Nominated	
MTV Video Music Awards	September 12, 2023	Best Choreography	"Dance the Night" – Charm La'Donna	Nominated	
MTV Video Music Awards	September 12, 2023	Song of Summer	"Barbie World" – Nicki Minaj and Ice Spice featuring Aqua	Nominated	
MTV Video Music Awards	September 12, 2023	Song of Summer	"Dance the Night" – Dua Lipa	Nominated	
MTV Video Music Awards	September 12, 2023	Song of Summer	"What Was I Made For?" – Billie Eilish	Nominated	
MTV Video Music Awards	September 11, 2024	Video for Good	"What Was I Made For?" – Billie Eilish	Won	
National Board of Review	December 6, 2023	Top Ten Films	Barbie	Won	
National Board of Review	December 6, 2023	Outstanding Achievement in Cinematography	Rodrigo Prieto	Won	
National Society of Film Critics Awards	January 6, 2024	Best Supporting Actor	Ryan Gosling	Runner-up (Note: Tied with Robert Downey Jr. for Oppenheimer)	
New York Film Critics Online Awards	December 15, 2023	Best Use of Music	Mark Ronson and Andrew Wyatt	Won	
Nickelodeon Kids' Choice Awards	July 13, 2024	Favorite Movie	Barbie	Won	
Nickelodeon Kids' Choice Awards	July 13, 2024	Favorite Movie Actor	Ryan Gosling	Nominated	
Nickelodeon Kids' Choice Awards	July 13, 2024	Favorite Movie Actress	America Ferrera	Nominated	
Nickelodeon Kids' Choice Awards	July 13, 2024	Favorite Movie Actress	Margot Robbie	Won	
Nickelodeon Kids' Choice Awards	July 13, 2024	Favorite Song	"Dance the Night" – Dua Lipa	Nominated	
Nickelodeon Kids' Choice Awards	July 13, 2024	Favorite Song	"What Was I Made For?" – Billie Eilish	Won	
Nickelodeon Kids' Choice Awards	July 13, 2024	Favorite Album	Barbie: The Album	Nominated	
Nickelodeon Kids' Choice Awards	July 13, 2024	Favorite Music Collaboration	"Barbie World" – Nicki Minaj and Ice Spice featuring Aqua	Won	
Nikkan Sports Film Awards	December 27, 2023	Best Foreign Film	Barbie	Won	
Online Film Critics Society	January 22, 2024	Best Picture	Barbie	Nominated	
Online Film Critics Society	January 22, 2024	Best Director	Greta Gerwig	Nominated	
Online Film Critics Society	January 22, 2024	Best Actress	Margot Robbie	Nominated	
Online Film Critics Society	January 22, 2024	Best Supporting Actor	Ryan Gosling	Nominated	
Online Film Critics Society	January 22, 2024	Best Original Screenplay	Greta Gerwig and Noah Baumbach	Nominated	
Online Film Critics Society	January 22, 2024	Best Cinematography	Rodrigo Prieto	Nominated	
Online Film Critics Society	January 22, 2024	Best Editing	Nick Houy	Nominated	
Online Film Critics Society	January 22, 2024	Best Costume Design	Jacqueline Durran	Won	
Online Film Critics Society	January 22, 2024	Best Production Design	Sarah Greenwood and Katie Spencer	Won	
Online Film Critics Society	January 22, 2024	Technical Achievements: Original Song	"I'm Just Ken"	Won	
Online Film Critics Society	January 22, 2024	Technical Achievements: Original Song	"What Was I Made For?"	Won	
Palm Springs International Film Festival	January 4, 2024	Director of the Year	Greta Gerwig	Won	
Palm Springs International Film Festival	January 4, 2024	Chairman's Honor	"What Was I Made For?" – Billie Eilish and Finneas O'Connell	Won	
People's Choice Awards	February 18, 2024	The Movie of the Year	Barbie	Won	
People's Choice Awards	February 18, 2024	The Comedy Movie of the Year	Barbie	Won	
People's Choice Awards	February 18, 2024	The Male Movie Star of the Year	Ryan Gosling	Won	
People's Choice Awards	February 18, 2024	The Female Movie Star of the Year	Margot Robbie	Won	
People's Choice Awards	February 18, 2024	The Comedy Movie Star of the Year	Ryan Gosling	Nominated	
People's Choice Awards	February 18, 2024	The Comedy Movie Star of the Year	Margot Robbie	Nominated	
People's Choice Awards	February 18, 2024	The Movie Performance of the Year	America Ferrera	Won	
People's Choice Awards	February 18, 2024	The Movie Performance of the Year	Simu Liu	Nominated	
People's Choice Awards	February 18, 2024	The Song of the Year	"Dance the Night" – Dua Lipa	Nominated	
People's Choice Awards	February 18, 2024	The Collaboration Song of the Year	"Barbie World" – Nicki Minaj and Ice Spice with Aqua	Won	
Producers Guild of America Awards	February 25, 2024	Best Theatrical Motion Picture	David Heyman, Margot Robbie, Tom Ackerley, and Robbie Brenner	Nominated	
Robert Awards	February 3, 2024	Best English Language Film	Greta Gerwig	Nominated	
San Diego Film Critics Society	December 19, 2023	Best Director	Greta Gerwig	Runner-up	
San Diego Film Critics Society	December 19, 2023	Best Actress	Margot Robbie	Nominated	
San Diego Film Critics Society	December 19, 2023	Best Supporting Actor	Ryan Gosling	Runner-up	
San Diego Film Critics Society	December 19, 2023	Best Comedic Performance	Ryan Gosling	Nominated	
San Diego Film Critics Society	December 19, 2023	Best Comedic Performance	Michael Cera	Won	
San Diego Film Critics Society	December 19, 2023	Best Original Screenplay	Greta Gerwig and Noah Baumbach	Won	
San Diego Film Critics Society	December 19, 2023	Best Ensemble	Barbie	Runner-up	
San Diego Film Critics Society	December 19, 2023	Best Cinematography	Rodrigo Prieto	Nominated	
San Diego Film Critics Society	December 19, 2023	Best Editing	Nick Houy	Nominated	
San Diego Film Critics Society	December 19, 2023	Best Costume Design	Jacqueline Durran, Charlotte Finlay, and Hope Slepak	Won	
San Diego Film Critics Society	December 19, 2023	Best Production Design	Sarah Greenwood	Won	
San Diego Film Critics Society	December 19, 2023	Best Use of Music	Barbie	Won	
San Francisco Bay Area Film Critics Circle Awards	January 9, 2024	Best Director	Greta Gerwig	Nominated	
San Francisco Bay Area Film Critics Circle Awards	January 9, 2024	Best Actress	Margot Robbie	Nominated	
San Francisco Bay Area Film Critics Circle Awards	January 9, 2024	Best Supporting Actor	Ryan Gosling	Nominated	
San Francisco Bay Area Film Critics Circle Awards	January 9, 2024	Best Original Screenplay	Greta Gerwig and Noah Baumbach	Nominated	
San Francisco Bay Area Film Critics Circle Awards	January 9, 2024	Best Cinematography	Rodrigo Prieto	Nominated	
San Francisco Bay Area Film Critics Circle Awards	January 9, 2024	Best Production Design	Sarah Greenwood	Won	
Santa Barbara International Film Festival	February 10, 2024	Kirk Douglas Award For Excellence In Film	Ryan Gosling	Won	
Santa Barbara International Film Festival	February 10, 2024	Virtuoso Award	America Ferrera	Won	
Santa Barbara International Film Festival	February 10, 2024	Variety Artisans Award	Billie Eilish and Finneas O'Connell – Songwriter	Won	
Santa Barbara International Film Festival	February 10, 2024	Variety Artisans Award	Sarah Greenwood/Katie Spencer – Production Designer	Won	
Satellite Awards	March 3, 2024	Best Motion Picture – Comedy or Musical	Barbie	Nominated	
Satellite Awards	March 3, 2024	Best Director	Greta Gerwig	Nominated	
Satellite Awards	March 3, 2024	Best Actress in a Motion Picture – Comedy or Musical	Margot Robbie	Nominated	
Satellite Awards	March 3, 2024	Best Supporting Actor – Motion Picture	Ryan Gosling	Nominated	
Satellite Awards	March 3, 2024	Best Supporting Actress – Motion Picture	America Ferrera	Nominated	
Satellite Awards	March 3, 2024	Best Original Screenplay	Greta Gerwig and Noah Baumbach	Nominated	
Satellite Awards	March 3, 2024	Best Costume Design	Jacqueline Durran	Nominated	
Satellite Awards	March 3, 2024	Best Film Editing	Nick Houy	Nominated	
Satellite Awards	March 3, 2024	Best Original Song	"I'm Just Ken" – Mark Ronson and Andrew Wyatt	Nominated	
Satellite Awards	March 3, 2024	Best Original Song	"What Was I Made For?" – Billie Eilish and Finneas O'Connell	Won	
Satellite Awards	March 3, 2024	Best Production Design	Sarah Greenwood and Katie Spencer	Won	
Saturn Awards	February 4, 2024	Best Fantasy Film	Barbie	Nominated	
Saturn Awards	February 4, 2024	Best Film Direction	Greta Gerwig	Nominated	
Saturn Awards	February 4, 2024	Best Film Writing	Greta Gerwig and Noah Baumbach	Nominated	
Saturn Awards	February 4, 2024	Best Actress in a Film	Margot Robbie	Won	
Saturn Awards	February 4, 2024	Best Supporting Actor in a Film	Ryan Gosling	Nominated	
Saturn Awards	February 4, 2024	Best Film Production Design	Sarah Greenwood	Won	
Saturn Awards	February 4, 2024	Best Music	Mark Ronson and Andrew Wyatt	Nominated	
Saturn Awards	February 4, 2024	Best Film Costume	Jacqueline Durran	Won	
Screen Actors Guild Awards	February 24, 2024	Outstanding Performance by a Cast in a Motion Picture	Michael Cera, Will Ferrell, America Ferrera, Ryan Gosling, Ariana Greenblatt, Kate McKinnon, Helen Mirren, Rhea Perlman, Issa Rae, and Margot Robbie	Nominated	
Screen Actors Guild Awards	February 24, 2024	Outstanding Performance by a Female Actor in a Leading Role	Margot Robbie	Nominated	
Screen Actors Guild Awards	February 24, 2024	Outstanding Performance by a Male Actor in a Supporting Role	Ryan Gosling	Nominated	
Screen Actors Guild Awards	February 24, 2024	Outstanding Performance by a Stunt Ensemble in a Motion Picture	Barbie	Nominated	
Seattle Film Critics Society Awards	January 8, 2024	Best Picture	Barbie	Nominated	
Seattle Film Critics Society Awards	January 8, 2024	Best Director	Greta Gerwig	Nominated	
Seattle Film Critics Society Awards	January 8, 2024	Best Actress in a Leading Role	Margot Robbie	Nominated	
Seattle Film Critics Society Awards	January 8, 2024	Best Actor in a Supporting Role	Ryan Gosling	Nominated	
Seattle Film Critics Society Awards	January 8, 2024	Best Ensemble Cast	Barbie	Nominated	
Seattle Film Critics Society Awards	January 8, 2024	Best Costume Design	Jacqueline Durran	Won	
Seattle Film Critics Society Awards	January 8, 2024	Best Production Design	Sarah Greenwood and Katie Spencer	Won	
Seattle Film Critics Society Awards	January 8, 2024	Best Youth Performance	Ariana Greenblatt	Nominated	
Seattle Film Critics Society Awards	January 8, 2024	Villain of the Year	"The Patriarchy"	Nominated	
Set Decorators Society of America Awards	February 13, 2024	Best Achievement in Décor/Design of a Science Fiction or Fantasy Feature Film	Sarah Greenwood and Katie Spencer	Won	
St. Louis Film Critics Association	December 17, 2023	Best Film	Barbie	Runner-up	
St. Louis Film Critics Association	December 17, 2023	Best Director	Greta Gerwig	Runner-up	
St. Louis Film Critics Association	December 17, 2023	Best Actress	Margot Robbie	Runner-up	
St. Louis Film Critics Association	December 17, 2023	Best Supporting Actor	Ryan Gosling	Won	
St. Louis Film Critics Association	December 17, 2023	Best Ensemble	Barbie	Runner-up (Note: Tied with Oppenheimer (2023))	
St. Louis Film Critics Association	December 17, 2023	Best Original Screenplay	Greta Gerwig and Noah Baumbach	Won	
St. Louis Film Critics Association	December 17, 2023	Best Production Design	Sarah Greenwood and Katie Spencer	Won	
St. Louis Film Critics Association	December 17, 2023	Best Costume Design	Jacqueline Durran	Won	
St. Louis Film Critics Association	December 17, 2023	Best Music Soundtrack	Mark Ronson and Andrew Wyatt	Won	
St. Louis Film Critics Association	December 17, 2023	Best Comedy	Barbie	Runner-up	
St. Louis Film Critics Association	December 17, 2023	Best Scene	Gloria (America Ferrara)'s monologue on impossible standards for women	Won	
Toronto Film Critics Association	December 17, 2023	Outstanding Supporting Performance	Ryan Gosling	Won	
Toronto Film Critics Association	December 17, 2023	Best Original Screenplay	Greta Gerwig and Noah Baumbach	Won	
Vancouver Film Critics Circle	February 12, 2024	Best Screenplay	Greta Gerwig and Noah Baumbach	Won	
Washington D.C. Area Film Critics Association Awards	December 10, 2023	Best Feature	Barbie	Nominated	
Washington D.C. Area Film Critics Association Awards	December 10, 2023	Best Director	Greta Gerwig	Nominated	
Washington D.C. Area Film Critics Association Awards	December 10, 2023	Best Original Screenplay	Greta Gerwig and Noah Baumbach	Nominated	
Washington D.C. Area Film Critics Association Awards	December 10, 2023	Best Actress	Margot Robbie	Nominated	
Washington D.C. Area Film Critics Association Awards	December 10, 2023	Best Supporting Actor	Ryan Gosling	Nominated	
Washington D.C. Area Film Critics Association Awards	December 10, 2023	Best Youth Performance	Ariana Greenblatt	Nominated	
Washington D.C. Area Film Critics Association Awards	December 10, 2023	Best Acting Ensemble	Barbie	Nominated	
Washington D.C. Area Film Critics Association Awards	December 10, 2023	Best Production Design	Sarah Greenwood and Katie Spencer	Won	
Washington D.C. Area Film Critics Association Awards	December 10, 2023	Best Cinematography	Rodrigo Prieto	Nominated	
Washington D.C. Area Film Critics Association Awards	December 10, 2023	Best Editing	Nick Houy	Nominated	
Women Film Critics Circle Awards	December 18, 2023	Best Movie About Women	Barbie	Won	
Women Film Critics Circle Awards	December 18, 2023	Best Equality of the Sexes	Barbie	Won	
Women Film Critics Circle Awards	December 18, 2023	Adrienne Shelly Award	Barbie	Nominated	
Women Film Critics Circle Awards	December 18, 2023	Karen Morley Award	Barbie	Nominated	
World Soundtrack Awards	October 17, 2024	Best Original Song	"Dance the Night" – Mark Ronson, Andrew Wyatt, Caroline Ailin, and Dua Lipa	Nominated	
World Soundtrack Awards	October 17, 2024	Best Original Song	"I'm Just Ken" – Andrew Wyatt, Mark Ronson, and Ryan Gosling	Nominated	
World Soundtrack Awards	October 17, 2024	Best Original Song	"What Was I Made For?" –Finneas O'Connell and Billie Eilish	Won	
Writers Guild of America Awards	April 14, 2024	Best Original Screenplay	Greta Gerwig and Noah Baumbach	Nominated	
