= Parker Kindred =

American drummer

- Born: Philadelphia, Pennsylvania
- Origin: New York, New York
- Genres: Alternative rock
- Occupation: Drummer
- Instruments: Drums; percussion; vocals
- Years active: before 1997–present
- Formerly of: Jeff Buckley band, The A.M.
- Website: antonyandthejohnsons.com

Parker Kindred is an American drummer who played in the band of Jeff Buckley, appearing on his unfinished second album, Sketches for My Sweetheart the Drunk in 1997, as well as playing live with Buckley and the rest of his band at Arlene's Grocery on February 9, 1997. Kindred was introduced to Buckley through Mick Grøndahl, then Buckley's bassist, as a permanent replacement for Eric Eidel after mainstay drummer Matt Johnson left the band at the end of the Australian leg of the tour.

After Buckley's death Kindred continued to work with the other band members on other projects in New York City. Kindred, with Michael Tighe and Buckley's then-girlfriend, Joan Wasser, formed Black Beetle. Shortly after Wasser embarked on a solo career and the band split up. However Tighe and Kindred continued to play together and later went on to form The A.M. with bassist Andrew Wyatt. Their debut self-titled LP was released in 2003 by Storm Music.

Kindred works with Joan Wasser on her solo project Joan As Police Woman since here second album To Survive released in 2008 until today (2024), and even before that they recorded with Antony and the Johnsons. Kindred has worked with numerous other artists as well, including Grand Mal, Adam Green, Mike Bones, Cass McCombs, Amen Dunes, Luke Temple, Minor Alps and Bill Whitten.

The UK's best-selling drum magazine Rhythm featured a two-page article on Kindred in January 2009.
