= Descender (disambiguation) =

A descender is the portion of a letter that extends below the baseline of a font.

Descender may also refer to:

- Descender (album) by Andrew Wyatt, 2013
- Descender (comics), a comic series by Jeff Lemire
- Descenders, 2018 video game
