= The A.M. =

American rock band

- Origin: New York City, U.S.
- Genres: Alternative rock
- Years active: 2002–present
- Label: Storm Music
- Members: Michael Tighe (vocals/guitar); Andrew Wyatt (bass/keyboards); Matt Johnson (bass)
- Past members: Parker Kindred (drums)

The A.M. was an American rock band from New York City formed in 2002 by rock musician Michael Tighe, formerly of the Jeff Buckley Band. Members also included bassist Andrew Wyatt and drummer Parker Kindred.

== History ==
After Jeff Buckley's death, Michael Tighe and Parker Kindred formed Black Beetle, along with Buckley's last girlfriend Joan Wasser. When Black Beetle split, with Wasser embarking on a solo career, Tighe and Kindred formed The A.M., along with bassist Andrew Wyatt. Their self-titled album was issued in 2003 on Storm Music. With influences ranging from 1970s glam rock to Joy Division and The Smiths, their sound has seen comparisons with Suede, David Bowie, King Crimson, Roxy Music, and T.Rex. As well as playing around the United States, they toured the United Kingdom and Ireland in 2003/4, as well as a date in Paris, receiving a positive critical reaction.

== Discography ==
=== Singles ===
- The Utopia EP (2002)
- "If I Was The Sheriff" (2003, Storm Music)
- "Utopia" (2004, Storm Music)

=== Albums ===
- The A.M. (2003, Storm Music)

1. Changeling
2. If I Was the Sheriff
3. Utopia
4. Isolation
5. It's Pouring
6. It's Not for Me
7. Spellbound
8. Deep City Diver
9. Transgression
10. Chanay
11. There Is a Time
12. Colors Are Beginning to Deepen
