= The Last Showgirl (soundtrack) =

The Last Showgirl (Original Motion Picture Soundtrack)

Film score by Andrew Wyatt
- Released: December 20, 2024
- Recorded: 2024
- Studio: Abbey Road Studios, London; Manhattan Center Studios, New York City
- Genre: Film score; soundtrack album
- Length: 31:30
- Label: Milan
- Producer: Andrew Wyatt

Andrew Wyatt chronology
Barbie (Score from the Original Motion Picture Soundtrack) (2023)	The Last Showgirl (Original Motion Picture Soundtrack) (2024)

Singles from The Last Showgirl (Original Motion Picture Soundtrack)
- 1. "Beautiful That Way" Released: December 9, 2024

The Last Showgirl (Original Motion Picture Soundtrack) is the soundtrack album to the 2024 film The Last Showgirl directed by Gia Coppola starring Pamela Anderson, Jamie Lee Curtis, Billie Lourd, Dave Bautista, Brenda Song, and Kiernan Shipka. The album consisted of the film's original score composed by Andrew Wyatt, and the original song "Beautiful That Way" performed by Miley Cyrus, which released as a single on December 9, 2024, and received nominations for Golden Globe Award for Best Original Song and Critics' Choice Movie Award for Best Song. The soundtrack was released through Milan Records on December 20, 2024, to positive reviews.

== Background ==
The film's score strongly influenced by the opening motif of Jon Hassell, 2009 Last Night The Moon Came Dropping its Clothes in the Street was written by Andrew Wyatt; Coppola sent him some stills and invited him to the film's shoot in Las Vegas in order to persuade him to join the project. The day after his performance of "I'm Just Ken", from the film Barbie (2023), at the 96th Academy Awards, Wyatt joined the film's shoot and watched the final cut, where he suggested to Coppola to incorporate an original song instead of a Dean Martin song that was previously present at the end of the film. He then reached out to Swedish musician Lykke Li, as he felt he needed a female perspective to go with the film's themes; the two had known each other for decades and founded Ingrid together in 2012. The film's closing song, "Beautiful That Way", was performed by Miley Cyrus, and written by Wyatt, Li, and Cyrus. Wyatt was working on Cyrus's upcoming studio album, and felt that her career from child star to adult musician would provide a good perspective while writing the song. The song was a last-minute addition to the film which was recorded in August 2024; Jamie Lee Curtis persuaded Cyrus to get involved at the 2024 ceremony when they were both inducted as Disney Legends and Cyrus got in touch with Wyatt the following day. Wyatt aimed for "Beautiful That Way" to sound like a Patsy Cline song.

Composing the score was an "exhaustive" process, according to Wyatt, as he had to juggle both working on the song and the score in time for the film's 2024 Toronto International Film Festival premiere. Elements of the song were also incorporated into the film's score, which was derived from the visual imagery and the score in particular was "my response to the images that I was seeing, which were kind of these beautiful but somehow sad images." The score was recorded at the Abbey Road Studios, with a 60-piece orchestra conducted by David Chase, was recorded at Manhattan Center.

== Release ==
The ballad "Beautiful That Way" was released as a single on December 9, 2024, with an accompanying music video featured the performance of Miley Cyrus. The score was released digitally on December 20, 2024, through Milan Records.

== Reception ==
Jen Yamato of The Washington Post wrote "Andrew Wyatt's expressive, nostalgic score of lush strings, piano and harps weaves a mythical soundscape." Benjamin Lee of The Guardian described it as a "soaring, often rather lovely score". Coleman Spilde of Salon.com wrote Wyatt's score "floats in and out of the film like a dream". called it as a "glittering score".

The ballad was released as a single on December 9, 2024, and received a nomination for Best Original Song at the 82nd Golden Globe Awards. It was also nominated for Best Song at the 30th Critics' Choice Awards, but it was not shortlisted for Best Original Song at the 97th Academy Awards, which was widely regarded as a snub.

== Track listing ==
All tracks are written by Andrew Wyatt, except where noted.

The Last Showgirl (Original Motion Picture Soundtrack) track listing
No.	Title	Length
1.	"The Last Showgirl"	1:38
2.	"Shelly's Dream"	1:36
3.	"Sparkle"	0:36
4.	"Bells in Heaven"	0:21
5.	"Rooftop Prelude"	0:55
6.	"A No Better Place to Go"	1:35
7.	"Rooftop Night"	1:08
8.	"Gold Reflections from the Wynn"	1:26
9.	"A No Better Place to Go, Pt. 2"	1:58
10.	"Classifieds"	0:55
11.	"Break in the Clouds"	1:42
12.	"Shelly's Dream (Piano)"	0:53
13.	"Shelly's Dream (Reprise)"	1:20
14.	"Razzle Dazzle"	1:56
15.	"Who to Blame"	1:49
16.	"Razzle Dazzle, Pt. 2"	2:48
17.	"True Romance"	0:44
18.	"Rooftop Reprise"	1:19
19.	"Dream Finale"	4:21
20.	"Beautiful That Way" (performed by Miley Cyrus; written by Wyatt, Lykke Li, and Cyrus)	2:20

== Personnel ==
Credits adapted from Film Music Reporter:

- Music composed and produced by: Andrew Wyatt
- Music contractor: Sandra Park
- Music preparation: Evan Barker, Mike McCoy, Harrison Joyce
- Publishing: Blakemore BMI Pub Designee (BMI), all rights administered by Warner-Tamerline Publishing Corp.
- Score mixed by: Jens Jungkurth
- Scoring engineer: Alex Venguer
- Scoring pro-tools operator: Angie Teo
- Orchestra recorded at: Manhattan Center Studios
- Conductor: David Chase
- Music recorded and mixed by: John Barrett
- Digital recordist: Chris Parker
- Assistant engineers: Freddie Light, Thomas Briggs
- Music recorded and mixed at: Abbey Road Studios, London

== Accolades ==
Award	Ceremony date	Category	Recipient(s)	Result	Ref.
Hollywood Music in Media Awards	November 20, 2024	Best Original Song – Independent Film	"Beautiful That Way" – Miley Cyrus, Lykke Li and Andrew Wyatt	Won	
Golden Globe Awards	January 5, 2025	Best Original Song	"Beautiful That Way" – Miley Cyrus, Lykke Li and Andrew Wyatt	Nominated	
Critics Choice Awards	February 7, 2025	Best Song	"Beautiful That Way" – Miley Cyrus, Lykke Li and Andrew Wyatt	Nominated	
Society of Composers & Lyricists	February 12, 2025	Outstanding Original Song for a Dramatic or Documentary Visual Media Production	"Beautiful That Way" – Miley Cyrus, Lykke Li and Andrew Wyatt	Nominated	
