= Dance the Night =

- Digital release cover

Single by Dua Lipa

from the album Barbie the Album
- Released: 25 May 2023
- Recorded: 2022
- Genre: Disco; synth-pop
- Length: 2:56
- Label: Atlantic; Warner
- Songwriters: Dua Lipa; Andrew Blakemore; Mark Ronson; Caroline Furøyen
- Producers: Andrew Wyatt; Mark Ronson; Picard Brothers

Dua Lipa singles chronology
"Potion" (2022)	"Dance the Night" (2023)	"Houdini" (2023)

Music video
- "Dance the Night" on YouTube

"Dance the Night" is a song by English singer Dua Lipa from the soundtrack to the fantasy comedy film Barbie (2023). Lipa co-wrote the song with songwriter Caroline Ailin and its producers Andrew Wyatt and Mark Ronson; the Picard Brothers also contributed to production. Atlantic and Warner Records released the song as the soundtrack's lead single on 25 May 2023. A disco and synth-pop song, it was inspired by a dance sequence in the film and is about always appearing flawless despite heartbreak.

Music critics overwhelmingly compared the song's sound to Lipa's second studio album, Future Nostalgia (2020), which was viewed positively by some but left others disappointed. It was nominated for several awards, including Song of the Year and Best Song Written for Visual Media at the 66th Annual Grammy Awards. "Dance the Night" reached number one in several countries, including the UK, and received multi-platinum certifications in Australia, Canada, New Zealand, Poland, and the UK, as well as diamond in France. It also reached number six on the Billboard Hot 100.

The music video for "Dance the Night" has a pink theme inspired by the Barbie aesthetic. It intersperses Lipa performing choreographed dances while singing the song with clips of Margot Robbie, Issa Rae, and Emma Mackey dancing at a disco party in the film, featuring a cameo appearance from Barbie's director Greta Gerwig at the end. The video received praise for its playful nature and Lipa's outfit. The song was included as the primary musical motif in the film. In 2024, Lipa sang one line from it while opening the 66th Annual Grammy Awards and performed it in full live for the first time at the Royal Albert Hall.

== Background and release ==
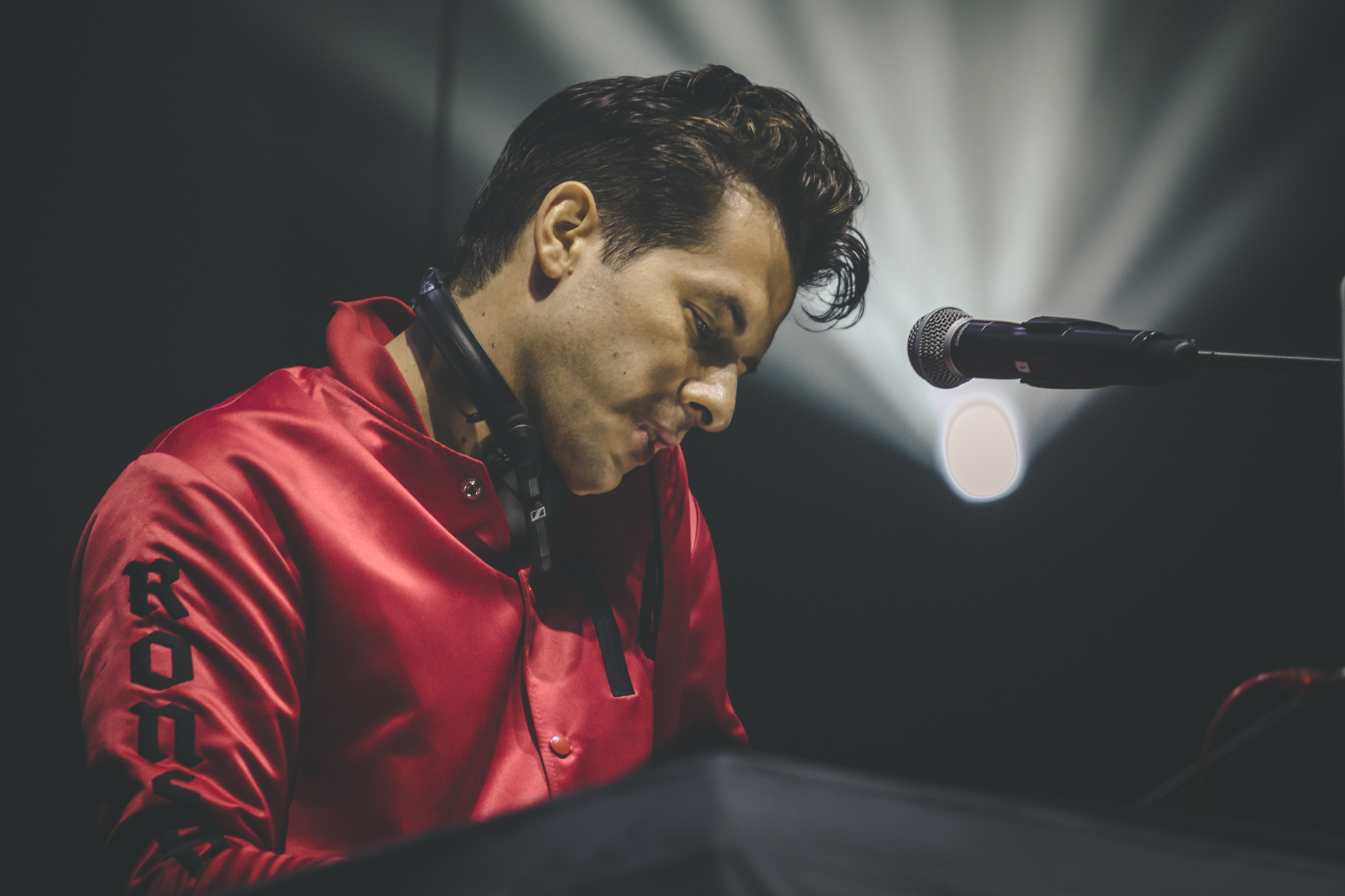
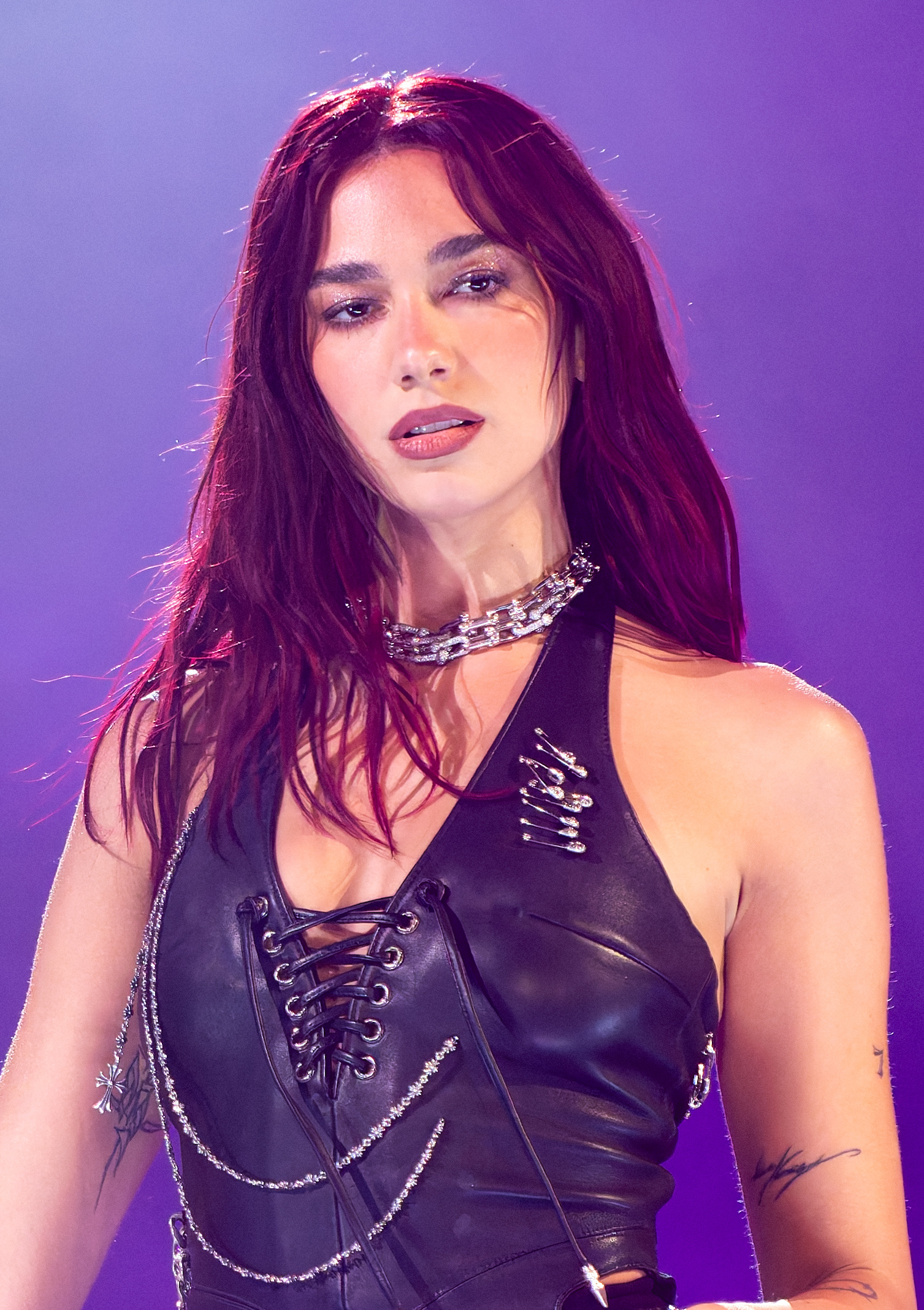
Mark Ronson (left) sought Dua Lipa's (right) involvement in the song as it sounded like her second studio album, Future Nostalgia (2020).

In March or April 2022, Mark Ronson received a text message from music supervisor George Drakoulias that simply stated: "Barbie?" Ronson was initially asked to create two songs for the fantasy comedy film Barbie: a pop song for a big dance sequence that was to be filmed within two weeks and a 1980s-style power ballad inspired by Ken. The film's director, Greta Gerwig, was inspired by the Bee Gees' work on the 1977 Saturday Night Fever soundtrack and requested that the pop song also be disco, sending him a playlist of her favourite music for reference. Observing similarities between Barbie and the ebb and flow of disco's popularity, Ronson watched the 2020 documentary film The Bee Gees: How Can You Mend a Broken Heart, which depicted Disco Demolition Night in 1979 Chicago, an event that signaled the genre's decline and closely paralleled Barbie's situation according to him. He set out to create a disco song which had "an unexpected slightly harder edge to it" and created a track called "Tastes Like Barbie" with Andrew Wyatt, while nearing the deadline. Gerwig was impressed and played it "100 times" while going to the film's set. Subsequently, they made a "dream list" of artists they desired to feature on the soundtrack and Ronson produced several other songs for it.

Ronson believed "Tastes Like Barbie" sounded like Dua Lipa's second studio album, Future Nostalgia (2020), and direct messaged her on Instagram to ask her to sing it for the soundtrack. Lipa, who was busy headlining the Future Nostalgia Tour and planned to distance herself from that disco sound on the follow-up album, accepted as she was a fan of Gerwig's work. She flew to New York and wrote the lyrics with Caroline Ailin in a studio over one week, the song now titled "Dance the Night"; Wyatt and Ronson are also co-writers. Lipa intended to soundtrack a scene where all things go "from good to bad" for Barbie, and she goes from being happy to thinking about death: "I love dance-crying. I knew it had to be fun, but I knew it needed a little element of sadness or a little pang of insufficiency". Initially satisfied with the melodies, chorus and verses, she later felt it could be improved and created new verses. Lipa wanted to synchronise the song to the choreography in its accompanying dance scene in the film—which she watched—approaching the process like writing a film score. Ronson and Lipa abandoned an initial melancholy version of the song and made it more upbeat to suit the scene, which represented a flawless day in Barbie's life. It was rewritten several times, and Lipa recalled: "Barbie completely took over our lives — we were completely Barb-ified." Parts of the song were updated to complement Margot Robbie's hand movements during the scene. The Picard Brothers assisted Ronson with the string arrangement.

In April 2023, it was revealed that Lipa had joined the cast of Barbie as Mermaid Barbie. On 22 May 2023, "Dance the Night" was announced as the lead single from the soundtrack, Barbie the Album (2023), set for release three days later. This marked her first musical output since the conclusion of Future Nostalgia's release cycle. Lipa shared a clip, in which she steps out of heels and recreates a shot of Robbie's arched foot in the second Barbie trailer before blowing a kiss to the camera; the song was later included in an official trailer. Warner Music Group sent it for radio airplay in Italy on 26 May, and Atlantic and Warner Records co-promoted the song to contemporary hit radio stations in the United States four days later. Warner also released "Dance the Night" on physical formats like cassette and CD.

== Composition and lyrics ==
"Dance the Night"
"Dance the Night" is a disco, disco-pop, and synth-pop song with influences of dance-pop. It incorporates violins and funky bass over a synth instrumental.

"Dance the Night" is 2 minutes and 56 seconds long. Wyatt, Ronson, and the Picard Brothers produced the song. Wyatt plays bass and synthesiser; Ronson plays guitar and Rhodes piano; and the Picard Brothers play keyboards and programmed the track with its engineer Brandon Bost. The song also features cello, violin, and viola in its instrumentation, and it was mixed by Serban Ghenea at MixStar Studios in Virginia Beach with assistance from Bryce Bordone.

Musically, "Dance the Night" is a disco, disco-pop, and synth-pop song with influences of dance-pop. Consequence's Mary Siroky described it as "a pitch-perfect mixture of synth-pop and disco", and Time Out's Ella Doyle believed the song to be pop but "reminiscent of disco at points". An up-tempo song, "Dance the Night" begins with violins and theatrical strings, followed by a beat drop. The song incorporates disco elements, acoustic guitars, and funky bass over its synth instrumental. Lipa employs a low yet distinctively feminine voice, which adeptly infuses emotional depth into manufactured-sounding music according to Lucas Martins of Beats Per Minute. Writing for PopMatters, Peter Piatkowski believed its neo-disco pays homage to the classic disco sound of Chic, Ashford & Simpson, and Hal Davis, and the strings and bass resemble the work of Donna Summer and Gloria Gaynor.

The lyrics of "Dance the Night" relate to the plot of Barbie and are about someone who always appears flawless. They detail how the narrator cannot be bothered to cry about a complex relationship and heartbreak when dancing. Lipa asks the listeners to "come along for the ride" and declares that she shines the most when faced with difficult situations. In the chorus, Lipa sings that she will keep dominating the party and "dance the night away", without anybody finding out that she is heartbroken. Despite being emotionally on edge, she continues to make herself look good and does not miss a beat while dancing. Lipa compares the tears streaming down her face to diamonds: "Even when the tears are flowin', they're diamonds on my face."

== Critical reception ==
"Dance the Night" received acclaim according to People's Jack Irvin. Siroky picked the track as "Song of the Week" and believed it could contend for the title of "song of the summer". She thought it would continue the trend of Lipa's songs being successful in playlists. Megan Armstrong of Uproxx opined that "Dance the Night" would receive a high amount of airplay during the summertime. Writing for Paste, Victoria Wasylak said the song could compete with any track on Future Nostalgia. The Sydney Morning Herald's Robert Moran and Doyle found it the embodiment of Lipa's signature sound.

The sound of "Dance the Night" was overwhelmingly compared to Future Nostalgia by music critics, some of whom viewed this positively while others considered it a disappointment. (Note: The positive critics included Siroky, iHeartRadio's Rebekah Gonzalez, Rolling Stone's Tomás Mier, and Clash's Robin Murray; negative critics included Pitchfork's Cat Zhang, The Independent's Adam White, NME's Alex Rigotti, and MusicOMH's Ben Devlin. Harper's Bazaar Arabia's Pranita Garg made the comparison neutrally.) Rebekah Gonzalez of iHeartRadio described the track as "another disco banger", and Tomás Mier of Rolling Stone thought several songs on the soundtrack bore a similarity to the artists' previous material and that this is what made it succeed. Pitchfork's Cat Zhang believed it was a "throwaway product" that was only half saved due to the film usage, and The Independent's Adam White thought the song was a "flat imitation" that did not match the quality of Future Nostalgia.

Critics also commented on Ronson's role as the producer. The Guardian's Elle Hunt believed "Dance the Night" featured the same sophisticated orchestration and meticulous attention to detail that made Ronson a highly sought-after producer; The Observer's Kit Buchan thought he succeeded but did not have "a requisite sprinkling of saccharine camp" for it. Martins praised the strings and thought the song fitted Barbie perfectly, but he opined that it did not reach the same level as Ronson and Lipa's first collaboration, "Electricity" (2018). Piatkowski praised the disco production for defying the bubblegum-pop expectations, and a couple of others thought it was suitable to dance to.

=== Accolades ===
"Dance the Night" was included on critical lists of the best songs of 2023 at number 15 by Billboard and unranked by Variety. Doyle named it the seventh-best pop song of all time in August that year. The song received several awards and nominations. At the 2023 MTV Video Music Awards, it was nominated for Best Pop Video, Best Choreography, and Song of Summer. "Dance the Night" won the Premios 40 Principales for Best International Song that year. At the 66th Annual Grammy Awards in 2024, the song was nominated for Song of the Year and Best Song Written for Visual Media. Other nominations include the Golden Globe Award for Best Original Song, the Astra Film and Houston Film Critics Society awards for Best Original Song, and the Global Award for Best Song. It was shortlisted for Best Original Song at the 96th Academy Awards but was not nominated.

== Commercial performance ==
"Dance the Night" became Lipa's fourth number-one single on the UK Singles Chart, making her the sixth British female solo artist to achieve four chart-toppers, and received a double platinum certification from the British Phonographic Industry. The song peaked at number six on the US Billboard Hot 100 issued for 16 September 2023, becoming her fifth to reach the top ten. It reached number four on the Canadian Hot 100 issued for 12 August 2023 and became Lipa's fourth top five single. "Dance the Night" was certified 3× platinum in Canada by Music Canada. In Australia, the song charted at number three and received a 4× platinum certification from the Australian Recording Industry Association. It peaked at number five in New Zealand and was certified 2× platinum.

"Dance the Night" reached number three on the Billboard Global 200. Elsewhere, the song charted at number one in Argentina, Belarus, Belgium, Bulgaria, the Commonwealth of Independent States, Croatia, the Czech Republic, Estonia, France, Hungary, Ireland, Israel, Kazakhstan, Latvia, Lithuania, Luxembourg, and the Netherlands. It peaked at number two in Brazil, Lebanon, Panama, and Paraguay. "Dance the Night" received a diamond certification in France, Lipa's tenth diamond certification in the country, 2× platinum in Poland and Spain, platinum in Belgium, Denmark, Italy, Portugal, Switzerland, and gold in Austria and Greece.

== Music video and promotion ==
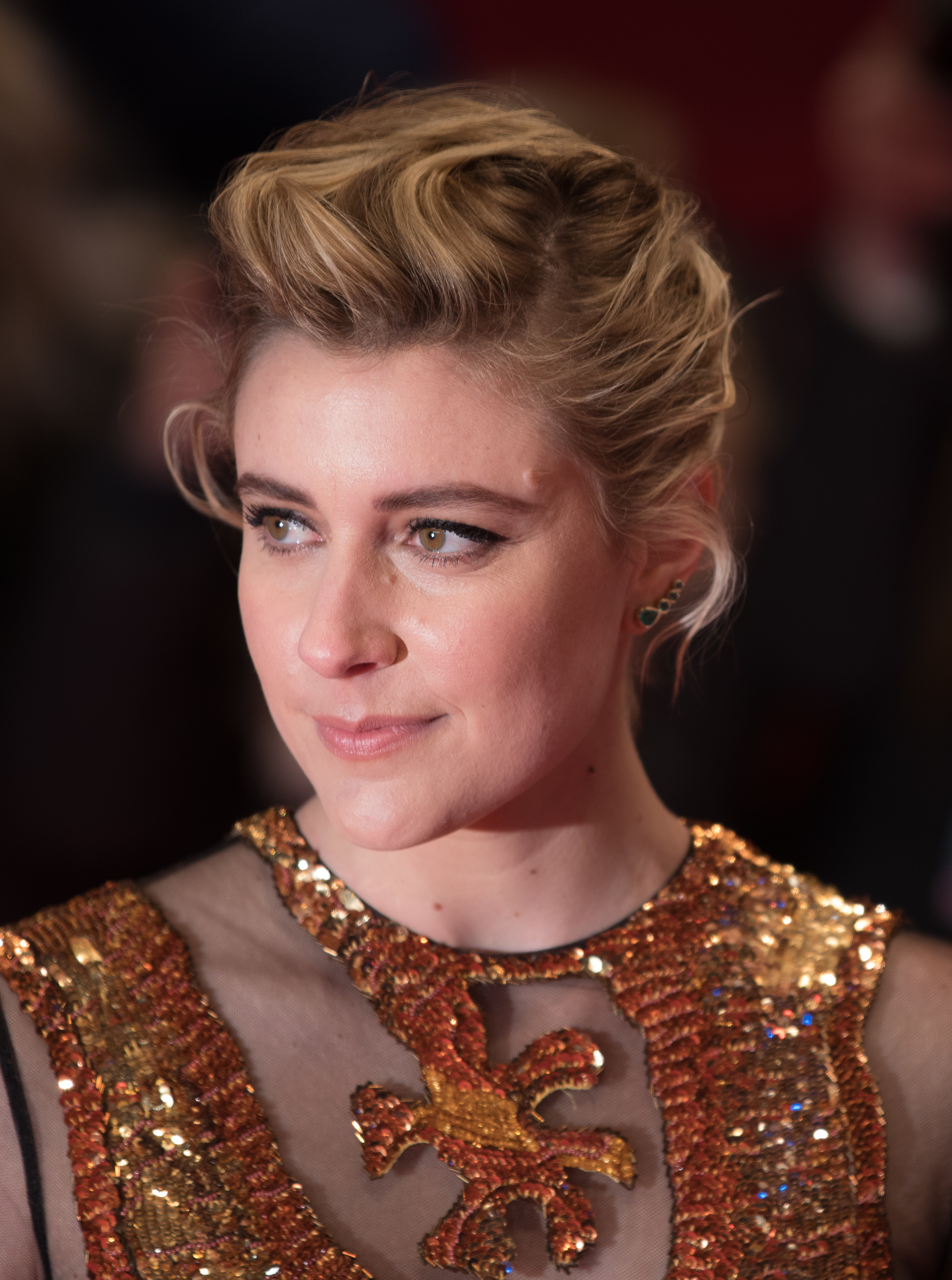
Greta Gerwig (pictured in 2018) makes a cameo in the music video for "Dance the Night".

The music video for "Dance the Night" has a pink theme inspired by the Barbie aesthetic. It prominently showcases items from La Vacanza, a clothing collection that Lipa created with Italian fashion designer Donatella Versace. Lipa wore metallic makeup and a high ponytail in it. Her outfit consisted of a pink and glittery cross-strap halter neck top with a keyhole cutout, alongside an ice-blue sparkling mini skirt with a thigh-high slit and butterfly embellishments. She also donned high-sheen metallic stiletto boots and gold jewellery including earrings, rings, bracelets, and a choker. The video features a cameo appearance from Gerwig and clips of Robbie, Issa Rae, and Emma Mackey in the film. It was released alongside the song.

In the video, Lipa gets ready to shoot a music video and learns choreography for it on a pink set, when a large disco ball plummets from the ceiling. According to Ronson, this represents her plans to move away from Future Nostalgia's dance sound with her future music. The words "This Barbie is making a music video" are briefly displayed on-screen. The following scenes intersperse Lipa performing choreographed dances while singing the song on a hot pink stage, near giant perfume bottles, and atop a huge Barbie heel, with scenes of Robbie, Rae, and Mackey dancing at a disco party in the film. At its conclusion, Gerwig gets out of a director's chair to praise Lipa's performance and question what happened to the disco ball as it is required for another music video.

Critics believed the video was playful and fitted the Barbie universe, successfully raising anticipation for the film. Harper's Bazaar Arabia's Pranita Garg thought that everything about it—ranging from the set design and costumes to the cameos—made her anticipate the film's premiere with great excitement. Larisha Paul of Rolling Stone stated that it is "as much glitter and glam as it is escapism and unease". Garg also praised Lipa's outfit, which she believed proved Lipa was a "style icon". Writing for Cosmopolitan, Megan Wallace opined it was worth fawning over and the inclusion of items from La Vacanza would help viewers get in the mood for parties.

"Dance the Night" was included as the primary musical motif in Barbie, featuring in a dance sequence in the film. On 2 August 2023, Eva Mendes shared a clip dancing to the track. Lipa sang one line from the song while opening the 66th Annual Grammy Awards on 4 February 2024, and it played in a video interlude during a costume change at her Glastonbury Festival 2024 set. She performed it in full live for the first time at the Royal Albert Hall on 17 October 2024, which was released on the live album Dua Lipa Live from the Royal Albert Hall (2024). At the Brit Awards 2026, Lipa performed the song as part of a medley with "Electricity" (2018), honouring Mark Ronson.

== Credits and personnel ==
Credits are adapted from the liner notes of Barbie the Album.

- Andrew Wyatt – producer, composer, bass, synthesiser
- Mark Ronson – producer, composer, guitar, Rhodes piano
- Picard Brothers – producer, programming, keyboards
- Dua Lipa – lyricist
- Caroline Ailin – lyricist
- Clarice Jensen, Alan Stepansky, Caitlin Sullivan, Susannah Chapman, Joel Noyes, Sarah Kwon – cello
- Lisa Kim, Matt Lehmann, Jungsun Yoo, Jennifer Kim, Joanna Maurer, Annaliesa Place, Ann Kim, Tallie Brunfelt, Henry Wang, Kristi Helberg, Jeongmin Lee, Peter Bahng, Angela Lee, Julia Choi, Sein Ryu, Jeremia Velazquez – violin
- Danielle Farina, Michael Roth, Robert Meyer, Alexis Sykes, Will Frampton, Torron Pfeffer – viola
- Brandon Bost – engineer, programming
- Cameron Gower-Poole – vocal engineer, vocal producer
- Alex Venguer – additional recording
- Serban Ghenea – mixing
- Bryce Bordone – mixing assistant
- Kostas Michaloudis – assistant engineer

== Charts ==
=== Weekly charts ===
Weekly chart performance
Chart (2023–2024)	Peak position
Argentina Hot 100 (Billboard)	37
Argentina Airplay (Monitor Latino)	1
Australia (ARIA)	3
Austria (Ö3 Austria Top 40)	4
Belarus Airplay (TopHit)	1
Belgium (Ultratop 50 Flanders)	1
Belgium (Ultratop 50 Wallonia)	1
Bolivia Airplay (Monitor Latino)	10
Brazil Airplay (Crowley Charts)	52
Brazil International Pop Airplay (Crowley Charts)	2
Bulgaria Airplay (PROPHON)	1
Canada Hot 100 (Billboard)	4
Canada AC (Billboard)	2
Canada CHR/Top 40 (Billboard)	1
Canada Hot AC (Billboard)	1
Chile Airplay (Monitor Latino)	6
Colombia Anglo Airplay (National-Report)	1
CIS Airplay (TopHit)	1
Croatia International Airplay (Top lista)	1
Czech Republic Airplay (ČNS IFPI)	1
Czech Republic Singles Digital (ČNS IFPI)	7
Denmark (Tracklisten)	8
Ecuador Airplay (National-Report)	6
El Salvador Airplay (Monitor Latino)	11
Estonia Airplay (TopHit)	1
Finland (Suomen virallinen lista)	33
France (SNEP)	5
France Airplay (SNEP)	1
Germany (GfK)	7
Global 200 (Billboard)	3
Greece International (IFPI)	8
Hong Kong (Billboard)	21
Hungary (Dance Top 40)	2
Hungary (Rádiós Top 40)	1
Hungary (Single Top 40)	11
Iceland (Tónlistinn)	3
Ireland (IRMA)	1
Israel International Airplay (Media Forest)	1
Italy (FIMI)	20
Japan Hot Overseas (Billboard Japan)	1
Kazakhstan Airplay (TopHit)	1
Latvia Airplay (LaIPA)	1
Latvia Streaming (LaIPA)	16
Lebanon (Lebanese Top 20)	2
Lithuania (AGATA)	14
Lithuania Airplay (TopHit)	1
Luxembourg (Billboard)	1
Malaysia (Billboard)	25
Malaysia International (RIM)	19
Moldova Airplay (TopHit)	36
Netherlands (Dutch Top 40)	1
Netherlands (Single Top 100)	4
New Zealand (Recorded Music NZ)	5
Nigeria (TurnTable Top 100)	41
Norway (VG-lista)	13
Panama Airplay (Monitor Latino)	2
Panama International (PRODUCE)	5
Paraguay Airplay (Monitor Latino)	2
Peru (Hot 100 Perú)	33
Poland (Polish Airplay Top 100)	3
Poland (Polish Streaming Top 100)	13
Portugal (AFP)	18
Romania Airplay (TopHit)	49
Russia Airplay (TopHit)	4
Singapore (RIAS)	8
Slovakia Airplay (ČNS IFPI)	5
Slovakia Singles Digital (ČNS IFPI)	7
South Korea Download (Circle)	138
Spain (Promusicae)	48
Suriname (Nationale Top 40)	3
Sweden (Sverigetopplistan)	25
Switzerland (Schweizer Hitparade)	3
Turkey International Airplay (Radiomonitor Türkiye)	8
UK Singles (Official Charts)	1
Ukraine Airplay (TopHit)	12
US Billboard Hot 100	6
US Adult Contemporary (Billboard)	4
US Adult Pop Airplay (Billboard)	1
US Dance Airplay (Billboard)	6
US Pop Airplay (Billboard)	1
US Rhythmic Airplay (Billboard)	37
Uruguay Airplay (Monitor Latino)	10
Venezuela Airplay (Record Report)	35

=== Monthly charts ===
Monthly chart performance
Chart (2023)	Peak position
Belarus Airplay (TopHit)	1
CIS Airplay (TopHit)	1
Estonia Airplay (TopHit)	1
Kazakhstan Airplay (TopHit)	1
Latvia Airplay (TopHit)	17
Lithuania Airplay (TopHit)	1
Moldova Airplay (TopHit)	71
Paraguay Airplay (SGP)	29
Romania Airplay (TopHit)	58
Russia Airplay (TopHit)	4
Ukraine Airplay (TopHit)	19

=== Year-end charts ===
2023 year-end chart performance for "Dance the Night"
Chart (2023)	Position
Australia (ARIA)	27
Austria (Ö3 Austria Top 40)	57
Belarus Airplay (TopHit)	33
Belgium (Ultratop 50 Flanders)	8
Belgium (Ultratop 50 Wallonia)	3
Bulgaria Airplay (PROPHON)	8
Canada (Canadian Hot 100)	19
CIS Airplay (TopHit)	15
Denmark (Tracklisten)	65
Estonia Airplay (TopHit)	5
France (SNEP)	56
Germany (Official German Charts)	62
Global 200 (Billboard)	63
Hungary (Dance Top 40)	24
Hungary (Rádiós Top 40)	18
Hungary (Single Top 40)	45
Iceland (Tónlistinn)	22
Italy (FIMI)	93
Kazakhstan Airplay (TopHit)	21
Latvia Airplay (TopHit)	45
Lithuania Airplay (TopHit)	2
Netherlands (Dutch Top 40)	13
Netherlands (Single Top 100)	35
Poland (Polish Airplay Top 100)	43
Poland (Polish Streaming Top 100)	75
Romania Airplay (TopHit)	122
Russia Airplay (TopHit)	29
Switzerland (Schweizer Hitparade)	38
Ukraine Airplay (TopHit)	200
UK Singles (OCC)	19
US Billboard Hot 100	35
US Adult Contemporary (Billboard)	16
US Adult Top 40 (Billboard)	11
US Mainstream Top 40 (Billboard)	12

2024 year-end chart performance for "Dance the Night"
Chart (2024)	Position
Australia (ARIA)	94
Belgium (Ultratop 50 Flanders)	92
Canada (Canadian Hot 100)	52
CIS Airplay (TopHit)	91
France (SNEP)	155
Global 200 (Billboard)	111
Hungary (Dance Top 40)	43
Hungary (Rádiós Top 40)	45
Lithuania Airplay (TopHit)	28
US Billboard Hot 100	100
US Adult Contemporary (Billboard)	7
US Adult Top 40 (Billboard)	19

Year-end chart performance
Chart (2025)	Position
Argentina Anglo Airplay (Monitor Latino)	65
Chile Airplay (Monitor Latino)	64
Hungary (Dance Top 40)	77
Lithuania Airplay (TopHit)	70

== Certifications ==
Certifications
Region	Certification	Certified units/sales
Australia (ARIA)	4× Platinum	280,000^{‡}
Austria (IFPI Austria)	Gold	15,000^{‡}
Belgium (BRMA)	Platinum	40,000^{‡}
Canada (Music Canada)	5× Platinum	400,000^{‡}
Denmark (IFPI Danmark)	Platinum	90,000^{‡}
France (SNEP)	Diamond	333,333^{‡}
Italy (FIMI)	Platinum	100,000^{‡}
New Zealand (RMNZ)	3× Platinum	90,000^{‡}
Poland (ZPAV)	2× Platinum	100,000^{‡}
Portugal (AFP)	Platinum	10,000^{‡}
Spain (Promusicae)	2× Platinum	120,000^{‡}
Switzerland (IFPI Switzerland)	Platinum	20,000^{‡}
United Kingdom (BPI)	2× Platinum	1,200,000^{‡}
Streaming
Greece (IFPI Greece)	Gold	1,000,000^{†}
^{‡} Sales+streaming figures based on certification alone.^{†} Streaming-only figures based on certification alone.

== Release history ==
Release dates and formats
Region	Date	Format(s)	Label(s)	Ref.
Various	25 May 2023	Digital download; streaming	Atlantic; Warner	
Italy	26 May 2023	Airplay	Warner	
United States	30 May 2023	Contemporary hit radio	Atlantic; Warner; (Note: Atlantic and Warner Records co-promoted "Dance the Night" to radio according to Billboard.)	
Ireland	14 August 2023	CD	Warner	
United Kingdom	14 August 2023	CD	Warner	
United Kingdom	24 August 2023	Cassette	Warner	

== See also ==
- List of number-one singles of 2023 (Ireland)
- List of UK Singles Chart number ones of the 2020s
