= Descender (album) =

Studio album by Andrew Wyatt
- Released: 16 April 2013
- Recorded: Prague
- Genre: Indie rock, indie pop, orchestral pop
- Length: 29:55
- Label: INGRID / Downtown Records
- Producer: Tobias Fröberg / Daniel Värjö

Andrew Wyatt chronology
Descender (2013)	Barbie (Score from the Original Motion Picture Soundtrack) (2023)

Singles from Descender
- 1. "And Septimus..." Released: 19 February 2013

Descender is the debut solo album by American singer/songwriter Andrew Wyatt of the indie dance trio Miike Snow. In a departure from his work with his main project and work as a producer, Wyatt recorded the album in Prague backed by the 75-piece Prague Philharmonic Orchestra, with guest appearances by the Libertines' Anthony Rossomando, Interpol's touring bassist Brad Truax, and Tortoise's John Herndon.

== Track listing ==
1. "Horse Latitudes" – 4:07
2. "Harlem Boyzz" – 3:07
3. "Cluster Subs" – 2:59
4. "She's Changed" – 2:33
5. "And Septimus..." – 3:31
6. "It Won't Let You Go" – 3:56
7. "Descender (Death Of 1000 Cuts)" – 2:37
8. "In Paris They Know How To Build A Monument" – 3:16
9. "There Is A Spring" – 3:49
