= Barbie (score) =

Barbie (Score from the Original Motion Picture Soundtrack)

Film score by Mark Ronson and Andrew Wyatt
- Released: August 4, 2023
- Studio: Manhattan Center Studios, New York City
- Genre: Film score
- Length: 44:34
- Label: WaterTower Music
- Producer: Mark Ronson; Andrew Wyatt

Mark Ronson chronology
Late Night Feelings (2019)	Barbie (Score from the Original Motion Picture Soundtrack) (2023)	Ken the EP (2023)

Andrew Wyatt chronology
Descender (2013)	Barbie (Score from the Original Motion Picture Soundtrack) (2023)	The Last Showgirl (Original Motion Picture Soundtrack) (2024)

Barbie (Score from the Original Motion Picture Soundtrack) is the score album to the 2023 film Barbie directed by Greta Gerwig from a screenplay she wrote with Noah Baumbach, and starring Margot Robbie and Ryan Gosling. Originally, Alexandre Desplat was recruited to score the film's music in September 2022, but following his exit, Mark Ronson and Andrew Wyatt, who executive produced the soundtrack and contributed to the production and composition of the original songs, worked on the film's score in March 2023. WaterTower Music released the album on August 4, 2023, digitally, with CD and vinyl formats released later.

The score was nominated several awards including the Grammy Award for Best Score Soundtrack Album for Visual Media.

== Development ==
Ronson had not composed an entire film score in his career, where he mostly produced the score for few sequences, and was unaware of how the film would be musically driven when it began. He received the film's script in March 2022, and liked it after writing the song "I'm Just Ken" and co-produced it with Wyatt, based on Ken's characterization. At the edit, Gerwig felt the song needed to be drawn out for a seven-minute battle sequence, insisting him to score for the film, which he agreed. Following this, he was tasked to score for the opening credits and eventually wound up writing more and more music until the team felt they were composing the entire score for the film.

"The thing I learned very, very quickly doing the score for Barbie is that you’re always serving the picture. You’re always serving the emotion. You have to turn off all the things you know about making pop and rock and soul music for the last 30 years. Yes, it needs to be beautiful, but sometimes you just need to get the fuck out the way."

— Mark Ronson, on curating the score for Barbie.

Ronson and Wyatt referenced the works of John Williams, Nino Rota and Carter Burwell, as well as Elmer Bernstein's score for Ghostbusters (1984) and contemporary music from the 1970s and 1980s such as those of the films Heaven Can Wait (1978) and Working Girl (1988). They further cited Maurice Jarre and Thomas Newman and the balance of synthesizers and orchestra in the "really lovely way". Ronson used the Yamaha CS-80 synthesizer from his studio, that produces a kind of "eerie and windy, but rich and emotive" referencing the sound of the television series Stranger Things. Gerwig enjoyed orchestral and classical music, which led to Ronson and Wyatt tasked with balancing two different sounds.

== Track listing ==
Barbie (Score from the Original Motion Picture Soundtrack) track listing
No.	Title	Length
1.	"Creation of Barbie"	2:01
2.	"Pink (Barbie Opening Theme)"	2:57
3.	"Beach Off"	1:47
4.	"Ken Thinks"	0:58
5.	"Stairway to Weird Barbie"	1:47
6.	"Thoughts of Death"	1:57
7.	"Send Me Through the Portal"	1:29
8.	"Ken Makes a Discovery"	1:33
9.	"Bus Stop Billie"	1:32
10.	"Mattel"	2:12
11.	"Meeting Ruth"	2:22
12.	"Lose These Chuckleheads"	2:09
13.	"You Failed Me!"	3:37
14.	"Alan vs Kens"	1:37
15.	"Deprogramming"	5:12
16.	"Warmth of Your Gaze"	3:51
17.	"An Ending"	2:25
18.	"I Don't Have an Ending"	3:36
19.	"What Was I Made For? (Epilogue)"	1:32
Total length:		44:34

== Reception ==
Zanobard Reviews wrote "Mark Ronson and Andrew Wyatt’s brightly exuberant score for Barbie serves as not only an excellent companion piece to the song album, but also a fun, energetic and indeed very enjoyable piece of musical work all on its own." Music critic Jonathan Broxton also said, "The way the two musical sides of this film – the original songs, and the original score – co-operate is very impressive to me, and shows me that [Greta] Gerwig, [Mark] Ronson, [Andrew] Wyatt, and the others thought a great deal about the musical content of their film, what they wanted it to say and do. And really, that’s pretty much all you can ask for." In a mixed review, critic based at Filmtracks.com commented "The score's only average appeal was likely a result sealed during the spotting stage of production, with the Eilish song's outsized influence a poor choice given its lack of warmth for any of those adaptations. The songs are also a very hit-and-miss prospect. The whole soundtrack requires a combined, chronological song and score presentation to best appreciate. The release of the two halves on separate albums defies the fact that all the music for Barbie is too synergistic for such a release."

=== Accolades ===
Award	Year	Category	Result	Ref.
Hollywood Music in Media Awards	2023	Best Original Score – Sci-Fi/Fantasy Film	Nominated	
Grammy Awards	2024	Best Score Soundtrack for Visual Media	Nominated	
