= Andrew Wyatt =

American musician (born 1971)

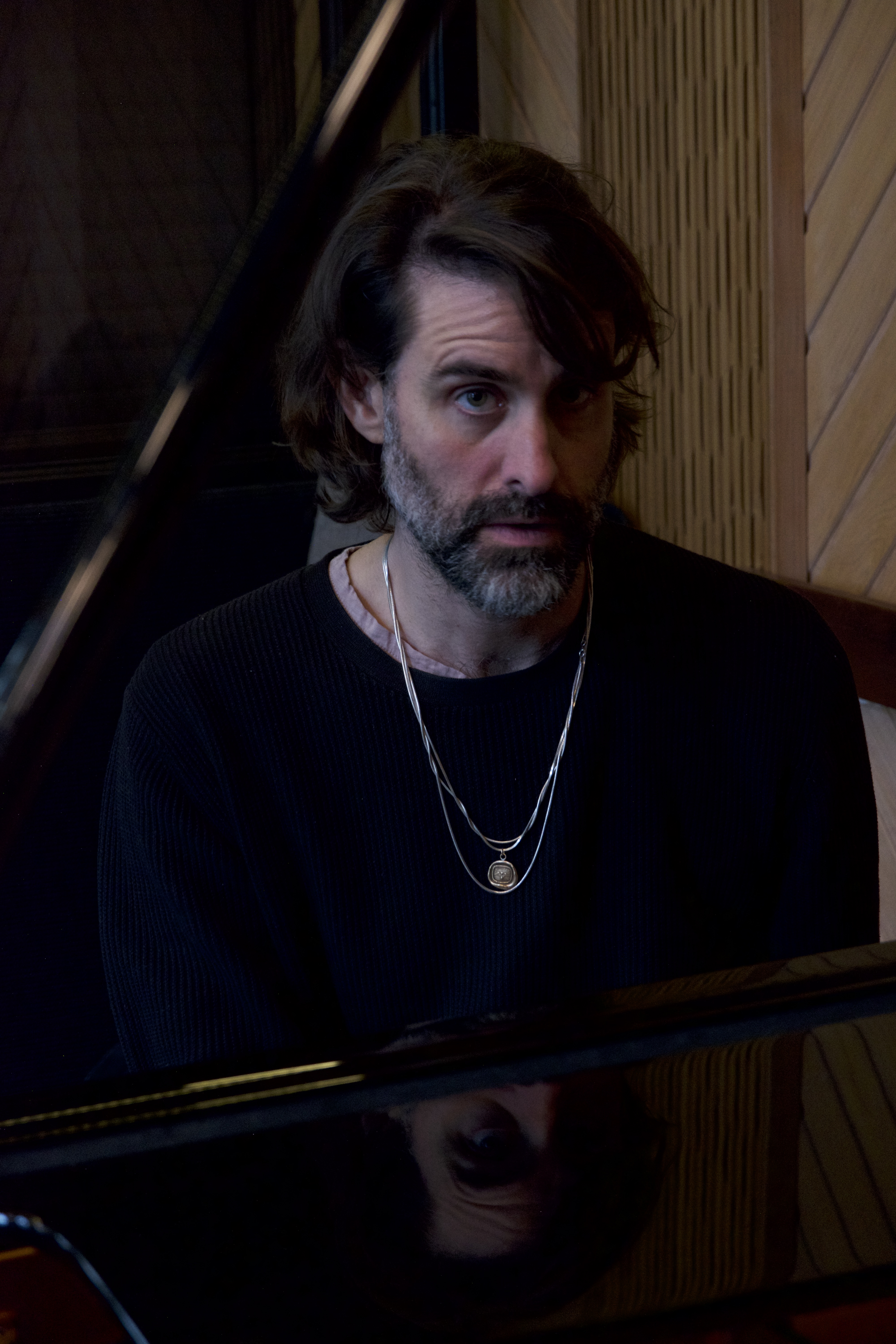
- Wyatt at RAK Studios London in 2018

Background information
- Born: Andrew Wyatt Blakemore; May 15, 1971 (age 55); Manhattan, New York, U.S.
- Genres: Alternative rock; electronica; indie pop
- Occupations: Musician; songwriter; record producer
- Instruments: Vocals; guitar; bass; keyboards
- Years active: 2003–present
- Labels: Downtown; Columbia

Andrew Wyatt Blakemore (born May 15, 1971) is an American musician, singer, songwriter and record producer. Born and raised in Manhattan, New York, he began his career playing in New York bands such as The A.M. and Black Beetle. He gained wider notability as the frontman of the Swedish electronic pop band Miike Snow, which released its acclaimed debut album in 2009. Since that time, Wyatt has released two other albums with the band as well as his solo debut Descender on Downtown Records in 2013.

Wyatt has worked with other artists, writing and/or producing songs with artists including Miley Cyrus, Liam Gallagher, Lady Gaga, Lorde, Bruno Mars, Jungle, and others. As a songwriter, Wyatt has been nominated for the Song of the Year Grammy Award twice. In 2019, he won the Academy Award for Best Original Song for his work with Lady Gaga, Mark Ronson, and Anthony Rossomando on "Shallow" from A Star is Born; the same year, the group was also awarded the Grammy Award for Best Song Written for Visual Media.

== Early life and education ==
Wyatt grew up on Perry Street in Manhattan, New York City, in the 1970s and 1980s. At 18, he and musician Greg Kurstin formed the short-lived experimental pop band Funkraphiliacs, whereupon he was signed to Capitol Records as a solo artist. He worked on the album at Peter Gabriel's Real World studios for about a year until drug addiction and psychological issues forced him into hospitalization. After his stay in rehab, Wyatt moved to a small mountain town in Colorado for several years, and he briefly attended the University of Colorado.

== Career ==
After briefly studying at classical conservatory, Wyatt returned to New York City and shortly thereafter formed the group The A.M. with Michael Tighe and Parker Kindred, formerly of Jeff Buckley's band. The group released one album on Universal UK before disbanding in 2005.

Wyatt is currently the lead singer and co-songwriter for the Swedish band Miike Snow.

Outside of his own projects, Wyatt has worked extensively with other artists, writing and/or producing songs with Carl Barat, Mark Ronson, Tiggers, Dragons of Zynth, Coco Sumner, and others. In 2011 Wyatt co-wrote "Grenade" with Bruno Mars. The song went to number one in several countries including the U.S., and earned a Grammy Nomination for Song of the Year. Recently, Wyatt began creating sound installations and video art for galleries, and debuted Waves, a collaboration with photographer / video artist Sebastian Mlynarski, at The New Museum in New York. He co-created the music for the 2012 one-act ballet "Carbon Life" along with Mark Ronson and Wayne McGregor.

Wyatt released his debut solo album Descender on April 16, 2013, on INGRID/Downtown Records, the album features the 75-piece Prague Philharmonic Orchestra with additional appearances by The Libertines' Anthony Rossomando, Spiritualized's bassist Brad Truax, Amen Dunes' Damon McMahon, and Tortoise's John Herndon. The only live performance of the album was at Capitale in New York City on May 10, 2013, as part of the Downtown Festival. A short documentary directed by Sebastian Mlynarski, entitled "The Making of Descender," was made in collaboration with The Creator's Project on March 19, 2013. In the documentary Wyatt discussed the challenges of completing the album in only a month, as that was the only time he had between Miike Snow tours and it gave a behind the scenes look at the recording process.

The first single from the project, "And Septimus...", was made available for streaming on February 19, 2013, and a music video for the single that was filmed in Buenos Aires and directed by Sebastian Mlynarski, premiered on Rolling Stone.com on May 7, 2013.

In May 2015, Wyatt collaborated with Flume on his track "Some Minds", featuring vocals and lyrics.

Andrew Wyatt earned the Academy Award for Best Original Song in 2019 for "Shallow", which he co-wrote with Lady Gaga, Mark Ronson and Anthony Rossomando. For Wyatt, Ronson and Rossomando, it was their first nomination and first win; for Lady Gaga, it was her second nomination and first win.

On June 29, 2019, Wyatt joined Liam Gallagher onstage at the 2019 Glastonbury Festival, playing guitar on "The River", which he co-wrote with the former Oasis frontman. It was one of eleven tracks co-written by Wyatt to feature on Gallagher's second album Why Me? Why Not., seven of which he also produced. The album was released in September 2019, and reached number one in the UK charts.

=== Production and songwriting credits ===
Year	Song	Artist	Album	Details
2026	"Neon Signs"	Miley Cyrus	Bass Persuades	Featured artist/producer/songwriter
2026	"This Mirror Weighs a Ton"	Interpol	This Mirror Weighs a Ton	Producer/Keyboardist
2026	"See Out Loud"	Interpol	This Mirror Weighs a Ton	Producer/Keyboardist
2026	"Iron City"	Interpol	This Mirror Weighs a Ton	Producer/Keyboardist
2026	"Wounded Soldier"	Interpol	This Mirror Weighs a Ton	Producer/Keyboardist
2026	"Wings on Fire"	Interpol	This Mirror Weighs a Ton	Producer/Keyboardist
2026	"Ever the Actor"	Interpol	This Mirror Weighs a Ton	Producer/Keyboardist
2026	"So Rides the Reindeer"	Interpol	This Mirror Weighs a Ton	Producer/Keyboardist
2026	"Darling Thoughts"	Interpol	This Mirror Weighs a Ton	Producer/Keyboardist
2026	"Wake Up"	Interpol	This Mirror Weighs a Ton	Producer/Keyboardist
2026	"Enemy"	Interpol	This Mirror Weighs a Ton	Producer/Keyboardist
2026	"Bird and the Serpent"	Interpol	This Mirror Weighs a Ton	Producer/Keyboardist
2026	"Sudden"	Interpol	This Mirror Weighs a Ton	Producer/Keyboardist
2025	"Dream As One"	Miley Cyrus	Avatar: Fire and Ash	Producer/Songwriter
2025	"Sauvignon Blanc"	Rosalía	LUX	Songwriter
2024	"Omega" (feat. Ralphie Choo)	Rosalía	Non-album single	Songwriter
2024	"Beautiful That Way"	Miley Cyrus	The Last Showgirl	Producer/Songwriter
2024	"Maybe You Know Me Now"	Andrew Wyatt	Non-album single	Performing Artist/Producer/Songwriter
2024	"These Walls"	Dua Lipa	Radical Optimism	Producer/Songwriter
2024	"Maria"	Dua Lipa	Radical Optimism	Producer/Songwriter
2024	"You For Christmas"	Kelly Clarkson	When Christmas Comes Around...	Songwriter
2023	"Dance the Night"	Dua Lipa	Barbie the Album	Producer/Songwriter
2023	"I'm Just Ken"	Ryan Gosling	Barbie the Album	Songwriter
2023	"What Was I Made For?"	Billie Eilish	Barbie the Album	Producer
2023	"Pink"	Lizzo	Barbie the Album	Producer/Songwriter
2023	"Beyond The Pale"	Andrew Wyatt	Non-album single	Performing Artist/Producer/Songwriter
2023	"Creation of Barbie"	Andrew Wyatt, Mark Ronson	Barbie (score)	Producer/Songwriter
2023	"Pink - "Barbie" Opening Theme"	Andrew Wyatt, Mark Ronson	Barbie (score)	Producer/Songwriter
2023	"Beach Off"	Andrew Wyatt, Mark Ronson	Barbie (score)	Producer/Songwriter
2023	"Ken Thinks"	Andrew Wyatt, Mark Ronson	Barbie (score)	Producer/Songwriter
2023	"Stairway to Weird Barbie"	Andrew Wyatt, Mark Ronson	Barbie (score)	Producer/Songwriter
2023	"Thoughts of Death"	Andrew Wyatt, Mark Ronson	Barbie (score)	Producer/Songwriter
2023	"Send Me Through the Portal"	Andrew Wyatt, Mark Ronson	Barbie (score)	Producer/Songwriter
2023	"Ken Makes a Discovery"	Andrew Wyatt, Mark Ronson	Barbie (score)	Producer/Songwriter
2023	"Bus Stop Billie"	Andrew Wyatt, Mark Ronson	Barbie (score)	Producer/Songwriter
2023	"Mattel"	Andrew Wyatt, Mark Ronson	Barbie (score)	Producer/Songwriter
2023	"Meeting Ruth" (feat. Molly Lewis)	Andrew Wyatt, Mark Ronson	Barbie (score)	Producer/Songwriter
2023	"Lose These Chuckleheads"	Andrew Wyatt, Mark Ronson	Barbie (score)	Producer/Songwriter
2023	"You Failed Me!"	Andrew Wyatt, Mark Ronson	Barbie (score)	Producer/Songwriter
2023	"Alan vs Kens"	Andrew Wyatt, Mark Ronson	Barbie (score)	Producer/Songwriter
2023	"Deprogramming"	Andrew Wyatt, Mark Ronson	Barbie (score)	Producer/Songwriter
2023	"Warmth of Your Gaze"	Andrew Wyatt, Mark Ronson	Barbie (score)	Producer/Songwriter
2023	"An Ending"	Andrew Wyatt, Mark Ronson	Barbie (score)	Producer/Songwriter
2023	"I Don't Have an Ending"	Andrew Wyatt, Mark Ronson	Barbie (score)	Producer/Songwriter
2023	"What Was I Made For? (Epilogue)"	Andrew Wyatt, Mark Ronson	Barbie (score)	Producer/Songwriter
2022	"More Power"	Liam Gallagher	C'mon You Know	Producer/Songwriter
2022	"Diamond in The Dark"	Liam Gallagher	C'mon You Know	Producer/Songwriter
2022	"Don't Go Halfway"	Liam Gallagher	C'mon You Know	Producer/Songwriter
2022	"It was not meant to be"	Liam Gallagher	C'mon You Know	Producer/Songwriter
2022	"Moscow Rules"	Liam Gallagher	C'mon You Know	Producer/Songwriter
2022	"I'm Free"	Liam Gallagher	C'mon You Know	Producer/Songwriter
2022	"Better Days"	Liam Gallagher	C'mon You Know	Producer/Songwriter
2022	"Oh Sweet Children"	Liam Gallagher	C'mon You Know	Producer/Songwriter
2022	"The Joker"	Liam Gallagher	C'mon You Know	Producer/Songwriter
2022	"Wave"	Liam Gallagher	C'mon You Know	Producer/Songwriter
2022	"C'mon You Know"	Liam Gallagher	C'mon You Know	Producer
2022	"World's In need"	Liam Gallagher	C'mon You Know	Producer
2022	"Burning"	Yeah Yeah Yeahs	Cool It Down	Producer/Songwriter
2022	"Different Today"	Yeah Yeah Yeahs	Cool It Down	Producer/Songwriter
2022	"Bless You"	Liam Gallagher	C'mon You Know	Producer
2022	"Sorry If I Hurt You"	Charli XCX	CRASH	Songwriter
2021	"Spinning (with Charli XCX & The 1975)"	No Rome, Charli XCX, The 1975	Non-album single	Songwriter
2021	"Bonnie Hill"	Jungle	Loving in Stereo	Songwriter
2020	"High"	Miley Cyrus	Plastic Hearts	Producer
2020	"Golden G String"	Miley Cyrus	Plastic Hearts	Producer/songwriter
2019	"Trigger"	Major Lazer, Khalid	Music Is the Weapon	Songwriter
2019	"Hit Me Where It Hurts"	Caroline Polachek	Pang	Co-producer/songwriter
2019	"Slide Away"	Miley Cyrus	She Is Coming	Producer/songwriter
2019	"One of Us"	Liam Gallagher	Why Me? Why Not.	Producer/songwriter
2019	"Once"	Liam Gallagher	Why Me? Why Not.	Producer/songwriter
2019	"The River"	Liam Gallagher	Why Me? Why Not.	Producer/songwriter
2019	"Alright Now"	Liam Gallagher	Why Me? Why Not.	Producer/songwriter
2019	"Gone"	Liam Gallagher	Why Me? Why Not.	Producer/songwriter
2019	"Invisible Sun"	Liam Gallagher	Why Me? Why Not.	Producer/songwriter
2019	"Glimmer"	Liam Gallagher	Why Me? Why Not.	Producer/songwriter
2019	"Shockwave"	Liam Gallagher	Why Me? Why Not.	Songwriter
2019	"Halo"	Liam Gallagher	Why Me? Why Not.	Songwriter
2019	"Be Still"	Liam Gallagher	Why Me? Why Not.	Songwriter
2019	"Meadow"	Liam Gallagher	Why Me? Why Not.	Songwriter
2019	"Don't Leave Me Lonely" (feat. YEBBA)	Mark Ronson	Late Night Feelings	Songwriter
2019	"When U Went Away" (feat. YEBBA)	Mark Ronson	Late Night Feelings	Songwriter
2019	"Mother's Daughter"	Miley Cyrus	She Is Coming	Producer/songwriter
2019	"Party Up the Street"	Miley Cyrus	She Is Coming	Producer/songwriter
2019	"Unholy"	Miley Cyrus	She Is Coming	Producer/songwriter
2019	"Cattitude"	Miley Cyrus	She Is Coming	Producer/songwriter
2019	"So Bad (feat. HAIM)"	Gesaffelstein	Hyperion	Songwriter
2019	"Mixer"	Amber Mark	Non-album single	Producer/songwriter
2018	"Don't Let The Sun Go Down On Me"	Miley Cyrus	Revamp: Reimagining the Songs of Elton John & Bernie Taupin	Producer
2018	"The Bitch is Back"	Miley Cyrus	Restoration: Reimagining the Songs of Elton John and Bernie Taupin	Producer
2018	"Amen"	Lil Wayne	Creed II: The Album	Co-producer/songwriter
2018	"Shallow"	Lady Gaga	A Star Is Born	Songwriter
2018	"No Choir"	Florence and the Machine	High as Hope	Songwriter
2018	"So Sad So Sexy"	Lykke Li	So Sad So Sexy	Songwriter
2017	"Perfect Places"	Lorde	Melodrama	Co-producer
2017	"First Time"	Kacy Hill	Like a Woman	Songwriter
2017	"Doesn't Have to Be That Way"	Liam Gallagher	As You Were	Songwriter
2017	"Come Back to Me"	Liam Gallagher	As You Were	Songwriter
2017	"Paper Crown"	Liam Gallagher	As You Were	Songwriter
2017	"Wall of Glass"	Liam Gallagher	As You Were	Songwriter
2017	"Chinatown"	Liam Gallagher	As You Were	Producer/songwriter
2017	"Heaven"	liv	data-sort-value="" style="background: var(--background-color-interactive, #ececec); color: var(--color-base, inherit); vertical-align: middle; text-align: center; " class="table-na" | Non-album singles	Songwriter/producer
2016	"Dream Awake"	liv	data-sort-value="" style="background: var(--background-color-interactive, #ececec); color: var(--color-base, inherit); vertical-align: middle; text-align: center; " class="table-na" | Non-album singles	Songwriter/producer
2016	"Wings of Love (Tantra Version feat. Jasbir Jassi)"	liv	data-sort-value="" style="background: var(--background-color-interactive, #ececec); color: var(--color-base, inherit); vertical-align: middle; text-align: center; " class="table-na" | Non-album singles	Songwriter/producer
2016	"Wings of Love"	liv	data-sort-value="" style="background: var(--background-color-interactive, #ececec); color: var(--color-base, inherit); vertical-align: middle; text-align: center; " class="table-na" | Non-album singles	Songwriter/producer
2016	"Wild Season"	Banks & Steelz	Anything But Words	Producer/songwriter
2016	"Wish That You Were Here"	Florence + The Machine	Miss Peregrine's Home for Peculiar Children	Songwriter
2016	"The Heart of Me"	Miike Snow	iii	Producer/songwriter
2016	"Genghis Khan"	Miike Snow	iii	Producer/songwriter
2016	"Heart Is Full"	Miike Snow	iii	Producer/songwriter
2016	"For U" (feat. Charli XCX)	Miike Snow	iii	Producer/songwriter
2016	"I Feel the Weight"	Miike Snow	iii	Producer/songwriter
2016	"Back of the Car"	Miike Snow	iii	Producer/songwriter
2016	"Lonely Life"	Miike Snow	iii	Producer/songwriter
2016	"Over and Over"	Miike Snow	iii	Producer/songwriter
2016	"Longshot (7 Nights)"	Miike Snow	iii	Producer/songwriter
2016	"My Trigger"	Miike Snow	iii	Producer/songwriter
2016	"Heart Is Full" (Remix feat. Run the Jewels)	Miike Snow	Non-album single	Producer/songwriter
2016	"Empire Underground"	The Big Pink	Empire Underground	Songwriter
2016	"Decoy"	The Big Pink	Empire Underground	Producer/songwriter
2016	"Everyday Life"	Lion Babe	Begin	Producer/songwriter
2015	"New Love"	Dua Lipa	Dua Lipa	Co-producer/songwriter
2015	"Some Minds" (feat. Andrew Wyatt)	Flume	Some Minds	Featured artist/songwriter
2015	"Little Ballerina"	Emile Haynie	We Fall	Songwriter
2015	"Who to Blame" (feat. Randy Newman)	Emile Haynie	We Fall	Songwriter
2015	"Come Find Me" (feat. Lykke Li and Romy)	Emile Haynie	We Fall	Songwriter
2015	"Nobody Believes You" (feat. Andrew Wyatt and Colin Blunstone)	Emile Haynie	We Fall	Featured artist/songwriter
2015	"Falling Apart" (feat. Andrew Wyatt and Brian Wilson)	Emile Haynie	We Fall	Featured artist/songwriter
2015	"Dreams"	Beck	Colors	Songwriter
2015	"Hand in the Fire" (feat. Charli XCX)	Mr. Oizo	Non-album single	Songwriter
2015	"Heavy and Rolling" (feat. Andrew Wyatt)	Mark Ronson	Uptown Special	Featured artist/songwriter
2015	"The Heart of You"	Anna Calvi	The Divergent Series: Insurgent	Songwriter
2014	"Push" (feat. Andrew Wyatt)	A-Trak	Push	Featured artist/songwriter
2014	"Die Tonight"	Charli XCX	Sucker	Songwriter
2014	"Need Ur Luv"	Charli XCX	Sucker	Songwriter
2013	"Horse Latitudes"	Andrew Wyatt	Descender	Producer/songwriter
2013	"Harlem Boyzz"	Andrew Wyatt	Descender	Producer/songwriter
2013	"Cluster Subs"	Andrew Wyatt	Descender	Producer/songwriter
2013	"She's Changed"	Andrew Wyatt	Descender	Producer/songwriter
2013	"And Septimus..."	Andrew Wyatt	Descender	Producer/songwriter
2013	"It Won't Let You Go"	Andrew Wyatt	Descender	Producer/songwriter
2013	"Descender (Death of 1000 Cuts)"	Andrew Wyatt	Descender	Producer/songwriter
2013	"In Paris They Know How to Build a Monument"	Andrew Wyatt	Descender	Producer/songwriter
2013	"There Is a Spring"	Andrew Wyatt	Descender	Producer/songwriter
2013	"Empty Church" (feat. Andrew Wyatt)	Creep	Echoes	Featured artist/songwriter
2012	"Remedy" (feat. Miike Snow)	Crookers	From Then Until Now	Featured artist/songwriter
2012	"When I Was Your Man"	Bruno Mars	Unorthodox Jukebox	Songwriter
2012	"Moonshine"	Bruno Mars	Unorthodox Jukebox	Songwriter
2012	"Enter the Jokers Lair"	Miike Snow	Happy to You	Producer/songwriter
2012	"The Wave"	Miike Snow	Happy to You	Producer/songwriter
2012	"Devil's Work"	Miike Snow	Happy to You	Producer/songwriter
2012	"Vase"	Miike Snow	Happy to You	Producer/songwriter
2012	"God Help This Divorce"	Miike Snow	Happy to You	Producer/songwriter
2012	"Bavarian #1 (Say You Will)"	Miike Snow	Happy to You	Producer/songwriter
2012	"Pretender"	Miike Snow	Happy to You	Producer/songwriter
2012	"Archipelago"	Miike Snow	Happy to You	Producer/songwriter
2012	"Black Tin Box" (feat. Lykke Li)	Miike Snow	Happy to You	Producer/songwriter
2012	"Paddling Out"	Miike Snow	Happy to You	Producer/songwriter
2011	"Dazed"	Daniel Merriweather	Arthur	Producer/songwriter
2010	"Change"	Daniel Merriweather	Love & War	Co-producer/songwriter
2010	"For Your Money"	Daniel Merriweather	Love & Money	Songwriter
2010	"Je Regrette, Je Regrette"	Carl Barât	Carl Barât	Songwriter/mixing-engineer
2010	"The Magus"	Carl Barât	Carl Barât	Songwriter/mixing-engineer
2010	"Ode to a Girl"	Carl Barât	Carl Barât	Songwriter/mixing-engineer
2010	"What Have I Done"	Carl Barât	Carl Barât	Songwriter/mixing-engineer
2010	"Somebody to Love Me" (feat. Andrew Wyatt and Boy George)	Mark Ronson & the Business Intl	Record Collection	Featured artist/songwriter
2010	"Grenade"	Bruno Mars	Doo-Wops & Hooligans	Songwriter
2009	"Animal"	Miike Snow	Miike Snow	Producer/songwriter
2009	"Burial"	Miike Snow	Miike Snow	Producer/songwriter
2009	"Silvia"	Miike Snow	Miike Snow	Producer/songwriter
2009	"Song for No One"	Miike Snow	Miike Snow	Producer/songwriter
2009	"Black & Blue"	Miike Snow	Miike Snow	Producer/songwriter
2009	"Sans Soleil"	Miike Snow	Miike Snow	Producer/songwriter
2009	"Cult Logic"	Miike Snow	Miike Snow	Producer/songwriter
2009	"Plastic Jungle"	Miike Snow	Miike Snow	Producer/songwriter
2009	"In Search Of"	Miike Snow	Miike Snow	Producer/songwriter
2009	"Faker"	Miike Snow	Miike Snow	Producer/songwriter
2009	"The Rabbit"	Miike Snow	Miike Snow	Producer/songwriter
2009	"Billie Holiday"	Miike Snow	Miike Snow	Producer/songwriter
2009	"Garden"	Miike Snow	Miike Snow	Producer/songwriter
2009	"No Starry World"	Miike Snow	Miike Snow	Producer/songwriter
2007	"PoP! Goes My Heart"	Hugh Grant	Music and Lyrics	Producer/songwriter
2007	"Buddha's Delight"	Haley Bennett	Music and Lyrics	Songwriter
2007	"Entering Bootytown"	Haley Bennett	Music and Lyrics	Songwriter
2007	"Invincible"	Haley Bennett	Music and Lyrics	Producer/songwriter
2005	"Shine"	Ricky Fanté	Robots	Songwriter
2003	"Deep City Diver"	The A.M.	The A.M.	Songwriter
2003	"If I Was the Sheriff"	The A.M.	The A.M.	Songwriter
2003	"Utopia"	The A.M.	The A.M.	Songwriter

=== Institutional works ===
Year	Title	Institution	Collaborators
2016	Valium Valentine	MoMA PS1	Sarah Ortmeyer
2012	Carbon Life	Royal Opera/The Royal Ballet	Mark Ronson and Wayne McGregor
2010	Waves	The New Museum	Sebastian Mlynarski

== Discography ==
Studio albums (selected)

- 2004: The A.M.
- 2009: Miike Snow
- 2012: Happy to You
- 2013: Descender
- 2016: iii

Sound installations

- 2010: Waves at The New Museum: Initiation w/Sebastian Mlynarski

Ballet Scores

- 2012: The Royal Ballet of London: Carbon Life with Mark Ronson

== Awards and nominations ==
Year	Awards	Category	Work	Result	Ref(s)
2012	Grammy Awards	Song of the Year	"Grenade"	Nominated	
2018	Hollywood Music in Media Awards	Best Original Song – Feature Film	"Shallow"	Won	
2019	Academy Awards	Best Original Song	"Shallow"	Won	
2019	Capri Hollywood International Film Festival	Best Original Song	"Shallow"	Won	
2019	Critics' Choice Movie Awards	Best Song	"Shallow"	Won	
2019	Georgia Film Critics Association	Best Original Song	"Shallow"	Won	
2019	Golden Globe Awards	Best Original Song	"Shallow"	Won	
2019	Grammy Awards	Song of the Year	"Shallow"	Nominated	
2019	Grammy Awards	Best Song Written for Visual Media	"Shallow"	Won	
2019	Houston Film Critics Society	Best Original Song	"Shallow"	Won	
2019	Satellite Awards	Best Original Song	"Shallow"	Won	
2024	Golden Globe Awards	Best Original Song	"I'm Just Ken"	Nominated	
2024	Golden Globe Awards	Best Original Song	"Dance the Night"	Nominated	
2024	Critics' Choice Movie Awards	Best Song	"I'm Just Ken"	Won	
2024	Critics' Choice Movie Awards	Best Song	"Dance the Night"	Nominated	
2024	Grammy Awards	Song of the Year	"Dance the Night"	Nominated	
2024	Grammy Awards	Best Song Written for Visual Media	"Dance the Night"	Nominated	
2024	Grammy Awards	Best Song Written for Visual Media	"I'm Just Ken"	Nominated	
2024	Grammy Awards	Best Score Soundtrack Album for Visual Media	Barbie	Nominated	
2024	Satellite Awards	Best Original Song	"I'm Just Ken"	Nominated	
2024	Academy Awards	Best Original Song	"I'm Just Ken"	Nominated	
