= Storm Music =

1934 novel by Dornford Yates

- First edition
- Author: Dornford Yates
- Genre: Novel
- Publisher: Hodder and Stoughton
- Publication date: 1934
- Media type: Print
- Pages: 317

Storm Music is a 1934 novel by the English author Dornford Yates (Cecil William Mercer). It was first serialised in Woman's Journal (December 1933 to April 1934, illustrated by Forster) and Woman's Home Companion (December 1933 to May 1934, under the title Bright With Peril, illustrated by Frederick Chapman).

== Plot ==
John Spencer (narrator) witnesses the burial of a murdered servant. Spencer identifies the man's employer as Lady Helena, tells her of the murder, and becomes her lover. A criminal gang attempt to steal the gold bullion secreted in the cellar of her home, the castle at Yorick.

== Background ==
This was another variation on Mercer's old theme of a castle with treasure. Mercer's biographer AJ Smithers, writing in 1982, suggested that “the faithful knew what they were buying without bothering to look at it".

== Critical reception ==
Once again, the critics approved and the novel sold well.

The original dustjacket included the following quotes -

- Punch: "Dornford Yates is a clever story-teller, and his skill is cleverly revealed in this adventurous romance."
- Sunday Times: "There is no lack of either excitement or mystery in this breathless story."
- Times Literary Supplement: "Dornford Yates manifests his abundant ingenuity once more in the opening of an excellent mystery yarn."

== Bibliography ==
- Smithers, AJ (1982). Dornford Yates. London: Hodder and Stoughton. ISBN 0-340-27547-2.
