= I'm Just Ken =

2023 song by Ryan Gosling

Song by Ryan Gosling

from the album Barbie the Album
- Released: July 21, 2023
- Recorded: March 2022
- Studio: Eastcote Studios, London
- Genre: Pop rock; art rock; glam rock
- Length: 3:42
- Label: Atlantic
- Songwriters: Mark Ronson; Andrew Blakemore
- Producers: Mark Ronson; Andrew Wyatt

Music video
- "I'm Just Ken" on YouTube

"I'm Just Ken" is a song performed by Canadian actor Ryan Gosling for the 2023 film Barbie. It was written and produced by Mark Ronson and Andrew Wyatt and appears on the soundtrack album Barbie the Album. As of May 2026, the song had over 160 million streams on Spotify and over 12 million views on YouTube. It won Best Song at the 29th Critics' Choice Awards and was nominated for Best Song Written for Visual Media at the 66th Annual Grammy Awards and Best Original Song at the 96th Academy Awards.

== Background ==
"I'm Just Ken" is described as a sentimental "'80s power ballad." Ahead of the film's release, marketing and promotional materials often contained the tagline, "She's everything. He's just Ken," an allusion to the song.

== Production ==
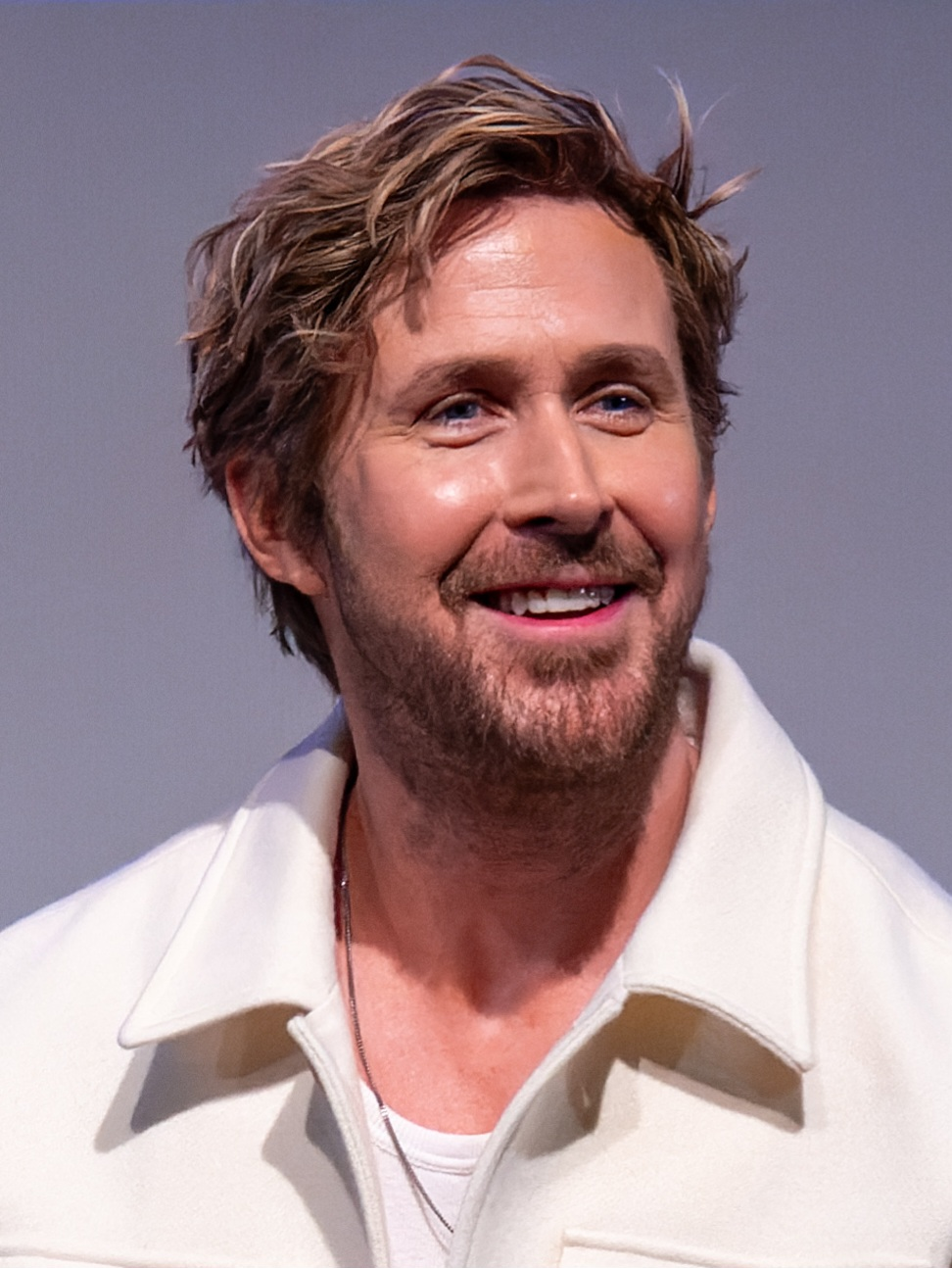
Ryan Gosling recorded "I'm Just Ken" in March 2022.

"I'm Just Ken" was one of the first songs written for Barbie the Album. Producer Mark Ronson was inspired to write the ballad after reading the Barbie script and sympathizing with Ken's character.

I instantly had this idea for this lyric: "I'm just Ken / Anywhere else I'd be a 10." It just seemed funny. It felt a little bit emo, like, this poor guy. He's so hot, but can't get the time of day.

— Mark Ronson, on writing "I'm Just Ken" for Barbie the Album

Ronson recorded a demo of "I'm Just Ken" and sent it to director Greta Gerwig, although he was not expecting it to be included in the film. Gerwig, however, loved the song and played it for Ryan Gosling, who played Ken. Gosling stated that it affected him "deeply" and asked if he could perform it in the film. Gerwig had to rewrite an important scene in the film to accommodate the new addition.

Ronson's colleague and fellow producer on the soundtrack, Andrew Wyatt, wrote the rest of the song before Ronson flew to London to record the vocals with Gosling at Eastcote Studios in March 2022. In an interview with Vulture, Ronson stated, "In the studio with Ryan, it was really his performance that lifted the whole thing. All these lines that felt a little bit throwaway-ish, delivered by him, suddenly took on much more." Gosling only had between two and three hours to record the track.

After Gosling recorded his vocals, Ronson sent the track to Guns N' Roses guitarist Slash, who found it "cool" and agreed to play guitar on the song. Guitarist Wolfgang Van Halen and Foo Fighters drummer Josh Freese also played on the track.

== Release ==
Ahead of Barbie's release, Warner Bros. released a clip of Gosling's performance of "I'm Just Ken" on July 10, 2023. A "behind-the-scenes" music video mixing rehearsal footage with clips from the actual musical sequence in the film was released on August 21, 2023.

=== Ken The EP ===
Ken the EP

EP by Ryan Gosling and Mark Ronson
- Released: December 20, 2023
- Genre: Pop
- Length: 13:54
- Label: Atlantic
- Producer: Mark Ronson

Mark Ronson chronology
Barbie (Score from the Original Motion Picture Soundtrack) (2023)	Ken the EP (2023)

On December 20, 2023, Gosling and Ronson released an extended play containing three additional versions of "I'm Just Ken" in addition to the original track. A performance video was released for the Christmas version, subtitled "Merry Kristmas Barbie", which features Gosling, Ronson, and Wyatt in the studio. The Christmas version was recorded and released within the span of a week.

Ken The EP track listing
No.	Title	Length
1.	"I'm Just Ken" (Merry Kristmas Barbie)	3:16
2.	"I'm Just Ken" (In My Feelings Acoustic)	3:59
3.	"I'm Just Ken" (Purple Disco Machine remix)	2:55
4.	"I'm Just Ken"	3:42
Total length:		13:54

== Accolades ==
Year	Award	Date of ceremony	Category	Result	Ref.
2023	Hollywood Music in Media Awards	November 15, 2023	Best Original Song in a Feature Film	Nominated	
2023	Hollywood Music in Media Awards	November 15, 2023	Best Onscreen Performance in a Feature Film	Nominated	
2023	Las Vegas Film Critics Society	December 13, 2023	Best Original Song	Won	
2023	Phoenix Film Critics Society	December 18, 2023	Best Original Song	Won	
2024	Academy Awards	March 10, 2024	Best Original Song	Nominated	
2024	Astra Film Awards	January 6, 2024	Best Original Song	Won	
2024	Critics Association of Central Florida	January 3, 2024	Best Original Song	Won	
2024	Critics' Choice Movie Awards	January 14, 2024	Best Song	Won	
2024	Denver Film Critics Society	January 12, 2024	Best Original Song	Nominated	
2024	Georgia Film Critics Association	January 5, 2024	Best Original Song	Runner-up	
2024	Gold Derby Film Awards	February 21, 2024	Best Original Song	Won	
2024	Golden Globe Awards	January 7, 2024	Best Original Song	Nominated	
2024	Grammy Awards	February 4, 2024	Best Song Written for Visual Media	Nominated	
2024	Guild of Music Supervisors Awards	March 3, 2024	Best Song Written and/or Recording Created for a Film	Nominated	
2024	Hawaii Film Critics Society	January 12, 2024	Best Song	Nominated	
2024	Houston Film Critics Society	January 22, 2024	Best Original Song	Won	
2024	Iowa Film Critics Association	January 17, 2024	Best Song	Won	
2024	Latino Entertainment Journalists Association	February 12, 2024	Best Song	Won	
2024	North Carolina Film Critics Association	January 3, 2024	Best Original Song	Won	
2024	North Dakota Film Society	January 15, 2024	Best Original Song	Nominated	
2024	Online Film Critics Society	January 22, 2024	Technical Achievements: Original Song	Honored	
2024	Online Film & Television Association	March 3, 2024	Best Original Song	Runner-up	
2024	Online Film & Television Association	March 3, 2024	Most Cinematic Moment	Nominated	
2024	Satellite Awards	March 3, 2024	Best Original Song	Nominated	
2024	Society of Composers & Lyricists	February 13, 2024	Outstanding Original Song for a Comedy or Musical Visual Media Production	Nominated	
2024	World Soundtrack Awards	October 17, 2024	Best Original Song	Nominated	

== Live performance ==
Gosling performed the song live at the 96th Academy Awards on March 10, 2024. The performance paid homage to the "Diamonds Are a Girl's Best Friend" sequence from Gentlemen Prefer Blondes starring Marilyn Monroe, as well as the choreographer Busby Berkeley. Gosling was joined by Ronson on bass, Wyatt on piano, and Wolfgang Van Halen and Slash on guitar, as well as his Barbie co-stars Simu Liu, Ncuti Gatwa, Kingsley Ben-Adir, and Scott Evans. The performance was choreographed by Mandy Moore, who also choreographed Gosling in La La Land.

== Parodies ==
On the October 14, 2023, episode of Saturday Night Live, comedian Pete Davidson parodied the song as "I'm Just Pete" to mock his personal life.

On March 15, 2024, British comedian Lenny Henry parodied the song as "I'm Just Len" as part of his final year as host of Comic Relief's annual Red Nose Day telethon.

== Personnel ==
All credits are adapted from the CD liner notes of Barbie the Album.

- Mark Ronson – songwriter, producer, bass guitar, synths
- Andrew Wyatt – songwriter, producer, synths, background vocals, choir arrangement
- Picard Brothers – additional production
- Slash – lead guitar, rhythm guitar
- Wolfgang Van Halen – rhythm guitar
- Josh Freese – drums
- Mike Richiuti – piano
- Roger Manning – synths
- Brandon Bost – programming, engineering
- Geoff Foster – male choir recording engineer
- Peter Cobbin – scoring engineer, female choir recording engineer
- Kirsty Whalley – scoring engineer, female choir recording engineer
- Daniel Hayden – Pro Tools recordist
- Alex Venguer – orchestra recording, piano recording engineer
- Matt Dunkley – orchestral arrangement
- Ben Parry – choirmaster
- Ricky Damian – engineering
- Jake Ferguson – assistant engineering
- Mike Clink – Slash recording
- Tom Elmhirst – mixing
- Adam Hong – engineering for mix
- Abbey Road Studios Orchestra – orchestra

== Charts ==
=== Weekly charts ===
Weekly chart performance for "I'm Just Ken"
Chart (2023)	Peak position
Australia (ARIA)	66
Austria (Ö3 Austria Top 40)	25
Canada (Canadian Hot 100)	48
Czech Republic Singles Digital (ČNS IFPI)	13
Germany (GfK)	67
Global 200 (Billboard)	70
Ireland (IRMA)	10
Netherlands (Single Top 100)	98
New Zealand (Recorded Music NZ)	25
Slovakia Singles Digital (ČNS IFPI)	55
Sweden Heatseeker (Sverigetopplistan)	2
Switzerland (Schweizer Hitparade)	60
UK Singles (Official Charts)	13
US Billboard Hot 100	87
US Hot Rock & Alternative Songs (Billboard)	5

=== Year-end charts ===
Year-end chart performance for "I'm Just Ken"
Chart (2023)	Position
US Hot Rock & Alternative Songs (Billboard)	69

== Certifications ==
Region	Certification	Certified units/sales
United Kingdom (BPI)	Silver	200,000^{‡}
^{‡} Sales+streaming figures based on certification alone.
