= Ms. Dynamite discography =

- Studio albums: 2
- Singles: 8
- Music videos: 12

This is a discography of the UK garage, R&B and hip hop singer and rapper Ms. Dynamite, twice winner of BRIT Awards and three times winner of MOBO Awards. It contains two studio albums and eight singles.

== Albums ==
=== Studio albums ===
Title	Album details	Peak chart positions					Certifications
Title	Album details	UK	FRA	NL	SCO	SWI	Certifications
A Little Deeper	Released: 10 June 2002; Label: Polydor; Formats: CD, LP, digital download	10	67	38	21	70	BPI: Platinum
Judgement Days	Released: 3 October 2005; Label: Polydor; Formats: CD, LP, digital download	43	72	—	99	—	
"—" denotes an album that did not chart or was not released in that territory.

=== Mixtapes ===
Title	Mixtape details
A Little Darker (with Akala)	Released: 2006; Label: Illa State Records; Format: Digital download

== Singles ==
=== As lead artist ===
Year	Title	Chart peak positions							Certifications	Album
Year	Title	UK	AUS	BEL	NZ	NL	SWE	SWI	Certifications	Album
2002	"It Takes More"	7	—	21	—	24	57	35		A Little Deeper
2002	"Dy-Na-Mi-Tee"	5	94	65	40	50	—	25	BPI: Silver	A Little Deeper
2002	"Put Him Out"	19	—	—	—	—	—	—		A Little Deeper
2005	"Judgement Day"/"Father"	25	—	—	—	—	—	—		Judgement Days
2006	"Fall in Love Again"	—	—	—	—	—	—	—		Judgement Days
2011	"Neva Soft"	33	—	108	—	—	—	—		Non-album singles
2013	"Cloud 9" (with Shy FX)	62	—	—	—	—	—	—		Non-album singles
2021	"Original Bad Gyal Material" (with Lisa Maffia)	—	—	—	—	—	—	—		Non-album singles
"—" denotes a single that did not chart or was not released in that territory.

=== As featured artist ===
Year	Title	Chart peak positions			Certifications	Album
Year	Title	UK	UK Dance	BEL	Certifications	Album
2001	"Booo!" (Sticky featuring Ms. Dynamite)	12	—	—		Non-album singles
2004	"Do They Know It's Christmas?" (as part of Band Aid 20)	1	—	3		Non-album singles
2009	"Lions Den" (The Nextmen featuring Ms. Dynamite and Andy Cato)	—	—	—		Join the Dots
2010	"Wile Out" (DJ Zinc featuring Ms. Dynamite)	38	4	—	BPI: Gold	Non-album singles
2010	"What You Talking About!?" (Redlight featuring Ms. Dynamite)	—	38	—		Non-album singles
2010	"Lights On" (Katy B featuring Ms. Dynamite)	4	—	11	BPI: Gold	On a Mission
2011	"Teardrop" (as part of The Collective)	24	—	—		Non-album singles
2012	"Light Up (The World)" (Yasmin featuring Shy FX and Ms. Dynamite)	50	10	—		Yasmin
2013	"Sweat" (Major Lazer featuring Ms. Dynamite and Laidback Luke)	—	—	—		Free the Universe
2014	"Dibby Dibby Sound" (DJ Fresh vs. Jay Fay featuring Ms. Dynamite)	3	—	23	BPI: Silver	Non-album singles
2015	"Cyah Help It" (Jus Now featuring Ms. Dynamite & Bunji Garlin)	—	—	—		Non-album singles
2020	"Again" (Clipz featuring Ms. Banks, Ms. Dynamite & Jaykae)	—	—	—		Non-album singles
"—" denotes a single that did not chart or was not released in that territory.

== Other charted songs ==
Title	Year	Peak chart positions	Album
Title	Year	FRA	Album
"No Money No Love" (David Guetta and Showtek featuring Elliphant and Ms. Dynamite)	2014	159	Listen

== Guest appearances ==
Year	Title	Album	Artist
2001	"Envy"	They Don't Know	So Solid Crew
2003	"Southern Hospitality" (Remix)	Chicken-n-Beer	Ludacris
2003	"A Real Love Survives (Rock Steady)" (Remix)	Everything In Time (B-sides, Rarities, Remixes)	No Doubt
2010	"Fire"	Magnetic Man	Magnetic Man
2011	"Sleep"	Soul is Heavy	Nneka
2012	"Gold Dust"	Nextlevelism	DJ Fresh
2020	"Again"	N/A	Clipz

== Remixes ==
Year	Title	Artist
2003	"Street Life (Dynamix)"	Beenie Man

== Music videos ==
Title	Year	Artist	Director
"Booo!"	2001	Sticky featuring Ms. Dynamite	
"It Takes More"	2002	Ms. Dynamite	Jake Nava
"Dy-Na-Mi-Tee"	2002	Ms. Dynamite	Jake Nava
"Put Him Out"	2002	Ms. Dynamite	
"Judgement Day"	2005	Ms. Dynamite	Giuseppe Capotondi
"Father"	2005	Ms. Dynamite	Daniel Woolfe
"Fall In Love Again"	2005	Ms. Dynamite	
"Wile Out"	2010	DJ Zinc featuring Ms. Dynamite	
"What You Talking About?"	2010	Redlight featuring Ms. Dynamite	
"Lights On"	2010	Katy B featuring Ms. Dynamite	
"Neva Soft"	2011	Ms. Dynamite	
"Teardrop"	2011	The Collective	
