= Christian Karlsson (DJ) =

Swedish DJ and record producer (born 1975)

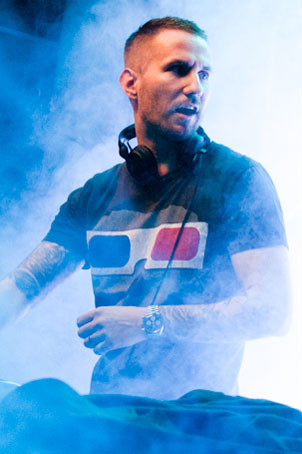
- Karlsson performing in 2011

Background information
- Also known as: Bloodshy boy
- Born: Lars Christian Karlsson; 14 July 1975 (age 51); Loftahammar, Kalmar, Sweden
- Genres: Electro, big room house, K-pop
- Occupations: DJ, percussionist, remixer, record producer
- Instruments: DAW, piano, guitar, turntables
- Years active: 1990s–present
- Member of: Miike Snow; Galantis
- Website: www.wearegalantis.com

Lars Christian Karlsson (born 14 July 1975), also known by his stage name Bloodshy, is a Swedish DJ, percussionist, record producer and remixer known for his work with the musical groups Bloodshy and Avant, Miike Snow, Ingrid, and Galantis. He started his international music career as one half of the electro pop duo Bloodshy & Avant with Pontus Winnberg, producing and co-writing tracks for pop stars such as Madonna, BoA, Kylie Minogue, and Katy Perry. Bloodshy & Avant notably co-wrote and produced Britney Spears' single "Toxic", which earned them a Grammy Award for Best Dance Recording in 2005. While continuing to work with Bloodshy and Avant, Karlsson also became a member of the indie pop band Miike Snow around 2007. Miike Snow, the group's debut album, was released in 2009, and peaked at number 11 on the Top Electronic Albums chart in the United States. Miike Snow won the 2011 European Border Breakers Award, and their second album Happy to You reached No. 1 on the Belgian Heatseekers Albums Chart and 43 on the Billboard 200.

Karlsson is also a member of electronic music group Galantis, having created it with Linus Eklöw. Their debut self-titled EP Galantis was released on 1 April 2014, and they debuted their live show at Coachella Valley Music and Arts Festival two weeks later. The duo won Coachella 2014's Best Dance Music Moment from Billboard, beating Calvin Harris and Chromeo with 52% of the vote. Galantis had international success with their single "Runaway (U & I)" in October 2014, which received a nomination for Best Dance Recording at the 58th Grammy Awards. Galantis released their debut album Pharmacy on 8 June 2015, and that year the duo was named Best Breakthrough Artist at the International Dance Music Awards. Karlsson continues to tour with both Galantis and Miike Snow, the latter of which released their third album, iii, in March 2016.

== Early life ==
Christian Karlsson began focusing on music at age thirteen, recollecting "I come from skateboard culture, so it was punk rock, and I got into hip hop when hip hop got into skateboarding. I had never done anything else but music." He began working in the studio mixing and producing music as a teenager, and held stints with Swedish pop groups such as Goldmine, who at one point opened for the Fugees.

== Music career ==
=== Bloodshy and Avant singles (2000–2005) ===
Early in his music career, Bloodshy began working with his childhood friend Pontus Winnberg on electronic music and house music. Karlsson adopted the moniker Bloodshy, and began working avidly on songwriting and producing with Winnberg as Bloodshy and Avant. The duo scored their first success working with American singer-songwriter Christina Milian for her late 2001 début album. The duo were then commissioned to work with English pop group Sugababes. Their subsequent collaboration with Ms. Dynamite resulted in several tracks on her 2002 album A Little Deeper, including her hit début single, "It Takes More".

Bloodshy and Avant co-wrote and produced two songs on Britney Spears' 2003 album In the Zone: "Showdown", and the hit single, "Toxic", which two years later won at the 47th Grammy Awards as Best Dance Recording, also winning a 2005 ASCAP Award for most performed song. Bloodshy and Avant subsequently produced all three new songs on Spears' 2004 Greatest Hits: My Prerogative, and also produced the theme song for her Britney & Kevin: Chaotic reality series in 2005.

After working with Spears, the duo continued to work with high-profile pop stars such as Katy Perry, Kylie Minogue, and Sky Ferreira. In 2005, Bloodshy and Avant co-wrote and co-produced two tracks with Madonna for her Confessions on a Dance Floor album. They also produced tracks for Ms. Dynamite's 2005 release Judgement Days. Bloodshy and Avant worked with Spears on her album Blackout in 2007, collaborating on songs such as "Piece of Me" and "Radar". In 2007, for Kylie Minogue's 10th studio album X, Bloodshy and Avant co-wrote and produced songs such as "Speakerphone". Bloodshy and Avant again helped Spears on her 2008 album Circus, producing tracks such as "Unusual You". Also that year, Bloodshy and Avant produced few songs for South Korean pop star BoA's English début BoA, and the following year they produced "Chocolate Love" for the K-pop girl groups Girls' Generation and f(x).

=== Miike Snow and INGRID (2008–2012) ===
External videos
- Miike Snow - "Animal" on VEVO (21 November 2009)
- Miike Snow - "Pretender" (Official Video)

Bloodshy and Avant encountered and befriended American vocalist Andrew Wyatt in 2007, formulating the idea for a future collaboration. Bloodshy and Avant soon formed the band Miike Snow with Wyatt, and Miike Snow, the group's debut album, was released in 2009. The first single to be taken from the album was the electro-pop "Animal", released on 17 February 2009. "Black & Blue", the album's second single, was released on 15 October 2009, while the third single "Silvia" was released on 22 January 2010 in the UK. The album peaked on number 11 on the Top Electronic Albums chart in the United States. Continuing to mix and perform with Bloodshy and Avant while with Miike Snow, in 2010 Karlsson worked with Sky Ferreira to produce singles like "One", which was released in August. In 2011, Karlsson alone co-produced two songs for Britney Spears' 7th studio album Femme Fatale, "How I Roll" and "Trip to Your Heart".

In July 2011, Karlsson co-founded the Swedish artist collective and record label INGRID along with Miike Snow, Peter Bjorn and John, Lykke Li, Coco Morier and Dungen. Beyond INGRID, Bloodshy and Avant own Studio Robotberget, a studio based in Stockholm. They also run a label called Ändersson with signed artists and musicians including Little Majorette, Sky Ferreira and Meadow. Miike Snow won the 2011 European Border Breakers Award. On 24 January 2012, Miike Snow released "Black Tin Box", a collaboration with Swedish singer Lykke Li. On 13 March 2012, Miike Snow released their second album Happy to You. It met with a largely positive response in publications such as AllMusic Rolling Stone, and NME, with a mixed review from Pitchfork Media. It charted well, reaching No. 1 on the Belgian Heatseekers Albums Chart and 43 on the Billboard 200.

=== Founding Galantis and "Smile" (2013) ===
External videos
- Galantis - "Smile" (Official Video) (Nov 20, 2013)

Karlsson is a member of a band called Galantis together with Linus Eklöw, which they formed around 2013. Karlsson and Eklöw had first met by chance at Karlsson's Robotberget studios in Stockholm, sometime in 2007. In 2009, Miike Snow asked Eklöw to remix their song "Animal". Afterwards Karlsson and Eklöw, both based in Sweden, started hanging out in the studio together, playing each other songs and scraps of ideas. In 2012 they stopped the loop-based and software-centric approach, switching to Karlsson's usual method of beginning a song on guitar or piano. "We keep the song naked, and when we feel like we have the right one, we put some clothes on it and see how it feels", says Karlsson. Christian and Eklöw said: "when we started Galantis, we set out to challenge each other and experiment with all of the sounds and ideas that we find exciting. We built a studio on a small island in the Baltic Sea and our surroundings became a source of inspiration."

Galantis signed to Atlantic Records' dance imprint Big Beat Records in mid-2013. Their first single with Big Beat Records, "Smile", was released that following November. As the first composition they agreed upon, "Smile" received several remixes from various artists, and an extended mix by Kaskade. "Smile" has also been featured by Kaskade, Diplo, Tiesto, Dada Life, Steve Angello, and Pete Tong, who featured it as an Essential Tune. Its controversial video premiered on Stereogum, and featured the first instance of the "Seafox", a band mascot created by visual artist Mat Maitland.

=== Galantis EP and touring (2014) ===
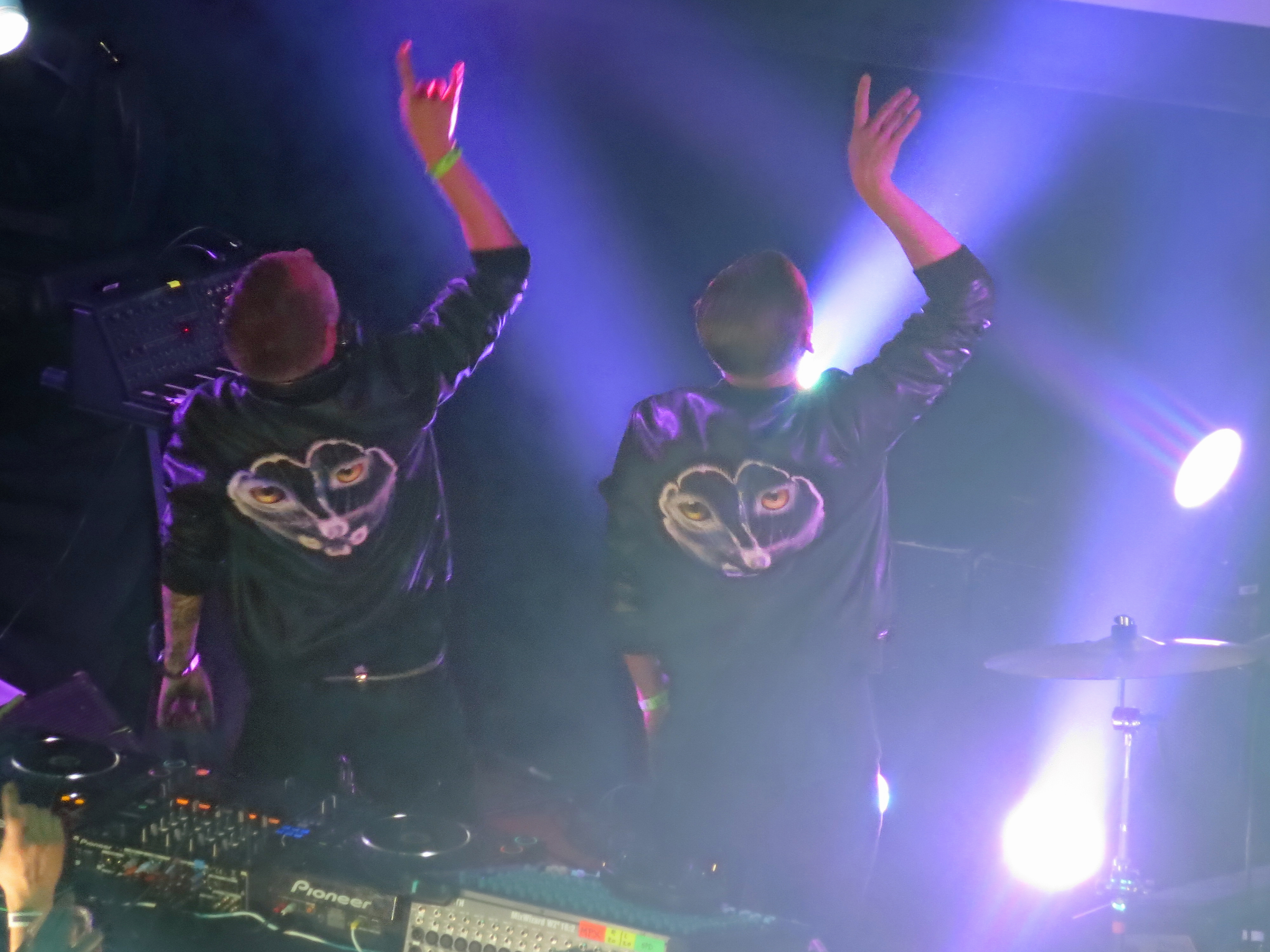
Galantis performing in Chicago in 2014

In February 2014, the duo released their second single "You". The track was subsequently played heavily at Winter Music Conference, becoming the 8th most Shazamed track at the festival. Their debut self-titled EP Galantis was released on April 1, 2014. Galantis debuted their live show at Coachella Valley Music and Arts Festival on April 12, 2014, about two weeks after they released their debut EP. In a Billboard Poll asking fans to vote on Coachella 2014's Best Dance Music Moment, Galantis beat Calvin Harris, Flume, Chromeo, Disclosure and Girl Talk with 52% of the vote. Their debut performance garnered praise from Dancing Astronaut, Los Angeles Times and Billboard, among other publications.

Galantis has had international success with their single "Runaway (U & I)", which debuted on 5 October 2014. Rolling Stone opined that the song was "riding high on unapologetically major-key synths and pitched-up vocals", also writing "the summer anthem added an organic touch to the undeniable earworm qualities of the best Scandinavian pop." The song reached the top of Spotify's Global and US Viral charts and became a top 10 Spotify track in the Netherlands, Belgium and Finland. In America, the track peaked at number 1 on the Billboard Twitter Emerging Artists chart, and Billboard ranked the song at number five on its "The 10 Best Electronic/Dance Songs of 2014" list. Furthermore, "Runaway (U & I)" received a nomination for Best Dance Recording at the 58th Grammy Awards, receiving a second Grammy nomination as well.

=== Pharmacy and singles (2015–2016) ===
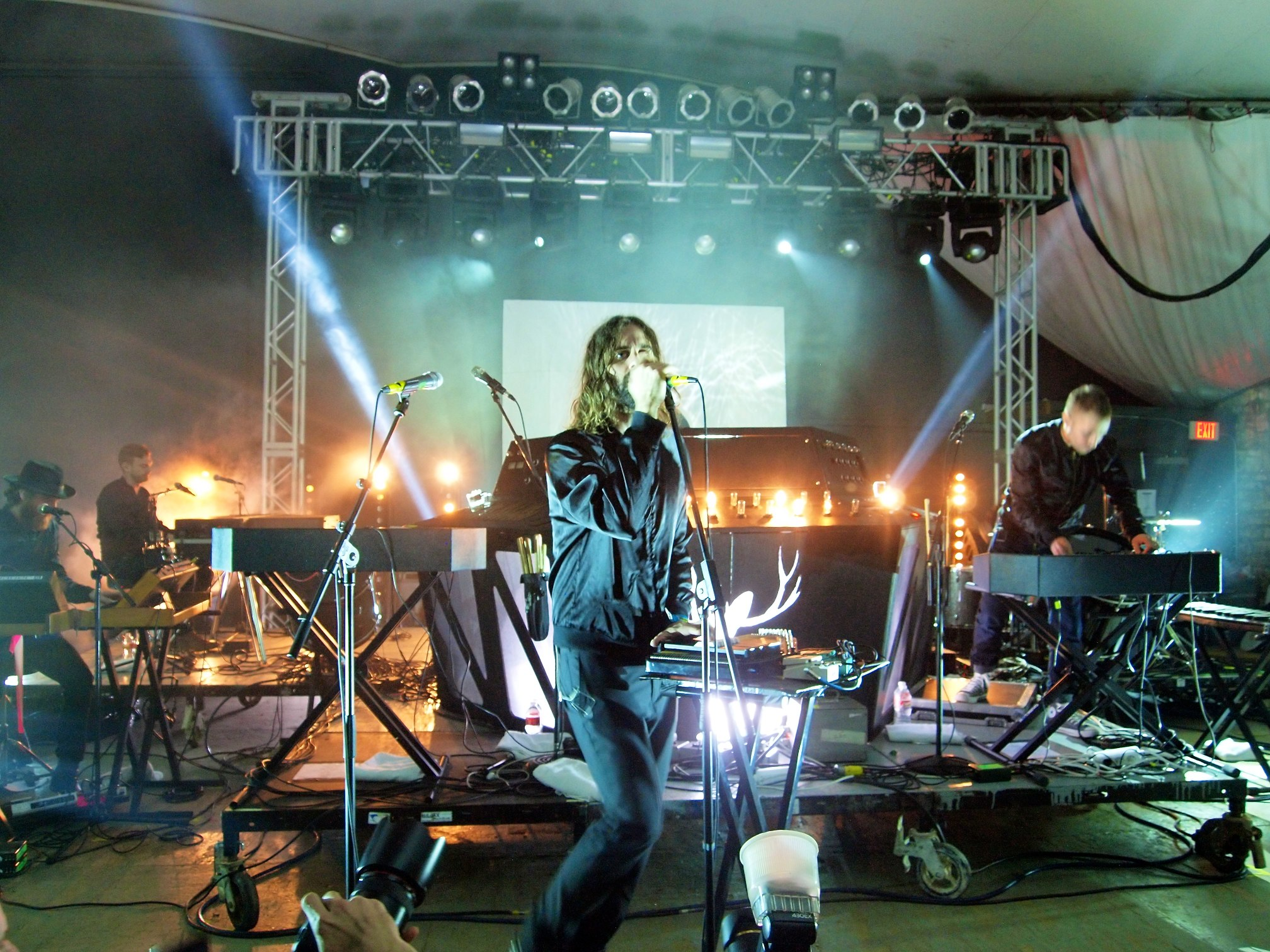
Karlsson (far right) performing with Miike Snow at SXSW

Galantis released the single "Gold Dust" on 19 February 2015 through Stereogum, which reached number 1 on Hype Machine's Popular Chart. In April 2015, Galantis released their single "Peanut Butter Jelly", which Rolling Stone called a "retro, funky slice of disco revival, with the kind of unforgettable, sing-along vocal hook destined for clubs, parties and spin classes." Time magazine wrote that the "infectious" track "samples the 1960s soul singer Bettye Swann, lending major retro vibes to its pulsing contemporary beat."

On May 21, 2015 Galantis began their summer tour in support of Pharmacy, which ended on August 6, 2015. There were 22 dates on the tour in total, with various performances in multiple continents including Europe and North America. Galantis released their debut album Pharmacy on June 8, 2015. The duo uploaded each song to their YouTube channel with alternate artworks for each track. Karlsson was touring with Galantis at the end of 2015 as well, with plans to hit venues in Las Vegas and other North American cities. In 2015, Galantis was named Best Breakthrough Artist at the International Dance Music Awards.

On March 4, 2016, Miike Snow released iii. With the band, Karlsson performed singles from the album on Jimmy Kimmel Live! on March 1, 2016. In addition, the band announced a tour in 2016 to promote the album, to take place from March 3, 2016 to July 29, 2016. Specific dates included SXSW, Coachella, the Governors Ball Music Festival and Lollapalooza, as well as others.

== Style and equipment ==
Karlsson is known for writing and producing a mixture of big room house, progressive house, and other electronic music genres. He uses similar approaches in his different musical groups, stating that with Galantis, they "always start with the song. We use guitar, piano, and bass lines we don't keep to figure out which clothes we're going to put on each melody and lyric. I think that's different than a lot of others in the dance scene. They have a beat they love and then force a top line on top of it." Karlsson furthermore stated that with Galantis, "A Galantis song sometimes has been only on a piano for two years before we even start putting a kick drum in it ... there's no Galantis song that starts with a beat or a track."

== Personal life ==
As of 2016, Karlsson is based in Bangkok with his family. He was diagnosed with attention deficit hyperactivity disorder as an adult, and his condition is the main focus of the 2023 Galantis single "Bang Bang! (My Neurodivergent Anthem)".

== Awards and nominations ==
Year	Award	Nominated work	Category	Result
2005	ASCAP Awards	"Toxic"	Most Performed Song	Won
2005	Grammy Awards	"Toxic"	Best Dance Recording	Won
2005	Ivor Novello Award	"Toxic"	Most Performed Work	Won
2007	Swedish Government	Bloodshy and Avant	Music Export Award	Won
2008	Swedish Music Publishers Association Awards	Bloodshy and Avant	Biggest International Success	Nominated
2011	European Border Breakers Awards	Miike Snow	Border Breakers	Won
2015	International Dance Music Awards	Galantis	Best Breakthrough Artist	Won
2016	Grammy Awards	"Runaway (U & I)"	Best Dance Recording	Nominated

== Discography ==
=== With Miike Snow ===
- Miike Snow (2009)
- Happy to You (2012)
- iii (2016)

=== With INGRID ===
- Hearts Beating Weak (2012)

=== With Galantis ===
- Galantis EP (2014)
- Pharmacy (2015)
