= Jonny Coffer =

English songwriter and record producer

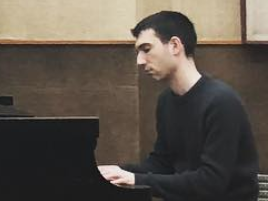
- Coffer in 2018

Background information
- Born: Jonathan Coffer; 8 March 1989 (age 37); London, England
- Genres: R&B; UK garage
- Occupations: Songwriter; record producer
- Years active: 2012–present
- Label: B-Unique

Jonathan Coffer (born 8 March 1989) is a British songwriter and record producer from London. He has written and produced for artists including Beyoncé, Kendrick Lamar, Lykke Li, FKA twigs, Naughty Boy, Emeli Sandé, Fall Out Boy, Weezer, Rita Ora, Alicia Keys, Martin Garrix, Ellie Goulding, Bastille, Jess Glynne, Rag'n'Bone Man, Tom Odell, Gorgon City, Wretch 32, Kamal., and Miley Cyrus.

He co-wrote the UK number 1 hit "La La La" feat. Sam Smith, as well as "Runnin' (Lose It All)" with Naughty Boy. Coffer co-wrote and produced the song "Freedom" feat. Kendrick Lamar from Beyonce's 2016 album Lemonade and co-wrote "Drown" feat. Clinton Kane for Martin Garrix. He also co-produced "High Hopes" with Panic! at the Disco, which reached #4 on the Billboard Hot 100.

Jonny is the brother of commercial barrister Benjamin Coffer.

== Discography ==
Year	Artist	Title	Label	Role
2024	Jazmin Bean	"Bitch with the Gun"	Aswang Birthday Cake/Interscope/Island Records	Co-composer, Producer
2023	Miley Cyrus ft. Sia	"Muddy Feet"	Columbia	Co-Producer
2023	Miley Cyrus	"You"	Columbia	Co-Producer
2022	FKA Twigs ft. shygirl	"papi bones"	Atlantic Records	Composer, Producer
2022	Jazmin Bean	"Puppy Pound"	Aswang Birthday Cake/Interscope/Island Records	Co-composer, Producer
2022	Kamal.	"nowhere to hide"	Neighbourhood	Composer, Producer
2022	Bastille	"Shut Off the Lights"	EMI Records	Composer, Co-Producer
2021	Alicia Keys	"Underdog"	RCA Records	Composer
2021	Alicia Keys	"Authors Of Forever"	RCA Records	Composer, Producer
2021	AREA21	"Followers"	Stmpd Rcrds / Hollywood Records	Composer, Co-Producer
2020	Martin Garrix ft. Clinton Kane	"Drown"	Epic Amsterdam	Composer
2020	Ellie Goulding	"Power"	Polydor Records (UK) / Interscope Records (U.S.A.)	Composer, Co-Producer
2018	Jess Glynne	"Broken"	Atlantic Records	Composer, Producer
2018	Plan B	"Heaven Before All Hell Breaks Loose"	Atlantic Records	Composer, Producer
2018	Panic! at the Disco	High Hopes	Fueled By Ramen	Producer
2018	Fall Out Boy	"Hold Me Tight, Or Don't"	Island/DCD2	Composer, Producer
2018	Kodaline	"Worth It"	B-Unique/RCA Records	Producer
2018	Kodaline	"Head Held High"	RCA Records	Composer
2018	Kodaline	"Don't Come Around"	B-Unique/RCA Records	Composer, Producer
2018	Kodaline	"Temple Bar"	B-Unique/RCA Records	Composer, Producer
2018	Rita Ora	"Girls"	Atlantic Records	Composer, Producer
2017	Emeli Sandé	"Happen"	Virgin Records	Composer, producer
2017	Emeli Sandé	"Shakes"	Virgin Records	Composer, producer
2017	Emeli Sandé	"Sweet Architect"	Virgin Records	Composer, producer
2017	Emeli Sandé	"I'd Rather Not"	Virgin Records	Composer, producer
2017	Emeli Sandé	"Kung Fu"	Virgin Records	Composer, producer
2017	Rag'n'Bone Man	"Skin"	Columbia	Composer, producer
2017	Rag'n'Bone Man	"Be the Man"	Columbia	Composer, producer
2017	Rag'n'Bone Man	"Arrow"	Columbia	Composer, producer
2017	Rag'n'Bone Man	"As You Are"	Columbia	Composer, producer
2017	Rag'n'Bone Man	"The Fire"	Columbia	Composer, producer
2017	Martin Garrix & David Guetta	"So Far Away"	Sony Music	Engineer
2017	Andrew McMahon in the Wilderness	"Zombies on Broadway"	Vanguard Records	Composer, Producer
2017	Weezer	"Feels Like Summer"	Crush Music	Composer, Producer
2017	Weezer	Get Right	Crush Music	Composer, Producer
2017	Lykke Li	"Two Nights"	RCA	Composer, Producer
2017	Lykke Li	Utopia	RCA	Composer, Producer
2016	Beyoncé ft. Kendrick Lamar	"Freedom"	Parkwood, Columbia	Composer, producer
2016	Weezer	"Jacked Up"	Crush Music	Composer
2016	All Saints	"This Is a War"	Universal Records	Composer
2016	Wretch 32 ft. Anne-Marie and PRGRSHN	"Alright With Me"	Ministry of Sound	Composer, producer
2016	Wretch 32 ft. Emeli Sande	"I.O.U."	Ministry of Sound	Producer
2016	Netsky ft. Emeli Sande	"Thunder"	Sony Music	Composer
2016	Robbie Williams	"Love My Life"	Sony Music	Composer
2015	Naughty Boy ft. Beyoncé and Arrow Benjamin	"Runnin' (Lose It All)"	Naughty Boy, Virgin EMI	Composer, producer
2015	Lena	"Beat to My Melody"	Universal Music Germany	Composer
2015	Audien	"Pharoahs"	Astralwerks, Anjunabeats	Composer
2015	Leona Lewis	"The Best and the Worst"	Island Records, Def Jam Recordings	Composer
2015	Jess Glynne	"No Rights No Wrongs"	Atlantic, Warner	Composer, producer
2015	Matt Nathanson	"Giants"	Acrobat, Vanguard	Composer, producer
2015	The Vamps	"Million Words"	Mercury, Virgin EMI	Composer
2015	Kyan	"Wire on the Fences"	Hospital Records	Composer, producer
2015	Ellie Goulding	"When Your Feet Don't Touch The Ground"	Interscope Records	Producer
2014	Joel Compass	"Forgive Me"	Polydor	Composer, producer
2014	Naughty Boy ft. Sam Smith	"La La La"	Naughty Boy, Virgin EMI, Capitol	Composer
2014	The Cab	"Stand Up"	Decaydance	Composer
2014	Gorgon City ft. Maverick Sabre	"Coming Home"	Virgin EMI, Black Butter	Composer, producer
2014	Gorgon City ft. Katy B	"Lover Like You"	Virgin EMI, Black Butter	Composer, producer
2014	Gorgon City ft. Erik Hassle	"FTPA"	Virgin EMI, Black Butter	Composer, producer
2014	Gorgon City ft. Zak Abel	"Unmissable"	Virgin EMI, Black Butter	Composer, producer
2014	Gorgon City ft. Maverick Sabre	"Hard on Me"	Virgin EMI, Black Butter	Composer, producer
2014	Gorgon City ft. Anne-Marie	"Try Me Out"	Virgin EMI, Black Butter	Composer, producer
2013	Naughty Boy ft. Professor Green, Emeli Sandé	"Lifted"	Naughty Boy, Virgin EMI	Composer
2013	Tinie Tempah ft. Laura Mvula	"Heroes"	Parlophone	Composer, strings
2013	James Arthur	"Get Down"	Syco Music	Composer, piano, strings
2012	Redlight	"Lost in Your Love"	Polydor Records	Composer
2012	Redlight	"Get Out My Head"	Polydor Records	Composer
