= Galantis (EP) =

EP by Galantis
- Released: 1 April 2014
- Recorded: 2013–2014
- Genre: Dance
- Labels: Big Beat; Atlantic
- Producers: Christian Karlsson; Linus Eklöw; Vincent Pontare

Galantis chronology
Galantis (2014)	Pharmacy (2015)

Singles from Galantis
- 1. "Smile" Released: 6 November 2013; 2. "You" Released: 1 April 2014

Galantis is the debut extended play by Swedish electronic music duo Galantis, released on 1 April 2014. The album features two singles, "Smile" and "You".

== Singles ==
Their first single with Big Beat Records, "Smile", was released that following November. Its controversial video premiered on Stereogum. "Smile" received several remixes from various artists, and an extended mix by dance music heavyweight Kaskade. In February, the duo released their second single "You". The track was subsequently played heavily at Winter Music Conference, becoming the 8th most Shazamed track at the festival.

== Artworks ==
"Smile" also marked the first instance of the "Seafox", a creature that is the brainchild of visual artist Mat Maitland. The "Seafox" is the Galantis mascot of sorts, appearing in all their videos, cover art and even their live show. The duo also refer to their fans as Seafox Nation and can often be seen using #seafoxnation on their social media sites. Each track has an artwork that goes along with it. These artworks were released on the same date as the album. The artwork go along with audio versions of the song on their YouTube channel and on SoundCloud.

== Track listing ==
No.	Title	Writer(s)	Producer(s)	Length
1.	"Smile"	Christian Karlsson; Linus Eklow; Jimmy "Svidden" Koitzsch; Carl Lof; Salem Al Fakir; Vincent Pontare	Galantis	4:05
2.	"You"	Karlsson; Eklow; Lof; Pontare	Galantis; Pontare	3:41
3.	"Revolution"	Karlsson; Eklow; Koitzsch; Henrik Jonback; Jennifer Decilveo; Leon Jean-Marie	Galantis	3:49
4.	"Help"	Karlsson; Eklow; Koitzsch; Catherine Dennis; Al Fakir; Pontare	Galantis	4:08
5.	"Friend (Hard Times)"	Karlsson; Eklow; Koitzach; Dennis; Seinabo Sey; Magnus Lidehäll	Galantis	4:23
6.	"The Heart That I'm Hearing"	Karlsson; Eklow; Koitzach; Jonback; Decilveo	Galantis	3:35
Total length:				23:41

- Track 1 features vocals from Vincent Pontare.
- Track 2 features vocals from Vincent Pontare and Britney Spears.
- Track 3 features vocals from Leon Jean-Marie.
- Track 4 features vocals from Salem Al Fakir and Vincent Pontare.
- Track 5 features vocals from Cathy Dennis
- Track 6 features vocals from Jennifer Decilveo.

Remixes
No.	Title	Length
1.	"Help" (Elephante Remix)	4:32
2.	"Smile" (Max Elto Rewind Version)	7:37
3.	"Smile" (Years Remix)	6:07
4.	"Help" (CID Remix)	5:18
5.	"You" (Moska Remix)	6:39
Total length:		30:13

== Charts ==
Chart (2015)	Peak position
US Top Dance Albums (Billboard)	72
