= Chicken Tendies =

2021 single by Clinton Kane

Single by Clinton Kane

from the album Maybe Someday It'll All Be OK
- Released: 19 February 2021
- Recorded: 2020
- Length: 3:16
- Label: Columbia; Sony Music
- Songwriter(s): Clinton Kane; Steve Rusch
- Producer(s): Steve Rusch

Clinton Kane singles chronology
"Change Ur Mind" (2021)	"Chicken Tendies" (2021)	"I Guess I'm in Love" (2021)

Music video
- "Chicken Tendies" on YouTube

"Chicken Tendies" (stylised in all capitals) is a song by singer Clinton Kane, released on 19 February 2021 as the lead single from his second EP, Maybe Someday It'll All Be OK.

Via a TikTok video, Kane said the song opens up the wounds of his strained relationship with his religious mother, and "about accepting things and relationships I can't change."

== Background and release ==
On 20 October 2020, Kane first teased the song as a "lil idea" via his TikTok. Two weeks later followed it with another preview of the chorus in a stripped down format.

On 10 December 2020, Kane shared a snippet of the song with the caption "haven't leaked a song in forever so here we are". The song was officially released on 19 February 2021.

== Charts ==
Chart performance for "Chicken Tendies"
Chart (2021)	Peak position
Australian Artist (ARIA)	16
Canada (Canadian Hot 100)	57
Global 200 (Billboard)	156
New Zealand Hot Singles (RMNZ)	4
UK Singles (OCC)	83
US Billboard Hot 100	88

== Certifications ==
Certifications for "Chicken Tendies"
Region	Certification	Certified units/sales
New Zealand (RMNZ)	Gold	15,000^{‡}
United States (RIAA)	Gold	500,000^{‡}
^{‡} Sales+streaming figures based on certification alone.
