= Go to Hell (Clinton Kane song) =

2021 single by Clinton Kane

Single by Clinton Kane

from the album Maybe Someday It'll All Be OK
- Released: 3 December 2021
- Recorded: 2021
- Length: 3:03
- Label: Columbia; Sony Music
- Songwriter(s): Clinton Kane; Steve Rusch
- Producer(s): Steve Rusch

Clinton Kane singles chronology
"I Guess I'm in Love" (2021)	"Go to Hell" (2021)	"14" (2022)

Music video
- "Go to Hell" on YouTube

"Go to Hell" (stylised in all capitals) is a song by Australian singer Clinton Kane, released on 3 December 2021 as the third single from his forthcoming second EP, Maybe Someday It'll All Be OK.

== Background and release ==
On 1 September 2021, Kane posted on twitter "ahaha just wrote a song and one of the line says why dont u take him and go to hell". Kane continued to tease the rock song on social media for a while and on 2 December 2021, Kane posted on twitter announcing the song's release at "midnight tonight".

== Reception ==
Daily Tribune said "'Go to Hell' leans more on the alternative rock leaning edge, a completely different genre from Kane's previous works." Hailey Hastings of Honey Pop said "The track has out-of-this-world vocals and is the start of an all-new era for an artist we simply can not get enough of."

== Charts ==
Chart performance for "Go to Hell"
Chart (2021)	Peak position
New Zealand Hot Singles (RMNZ)	8
US Hot Rock & Alternative Songs (Billboard)	18
