= Drown (Martin Garrix song) =

2020 song by Martin Garrix featuring Clinton Kane

Single by Martin Garrix featuring Clinton Kane
- Released: 27 February 2020
- Genre: EDM; pop
- Length: 2:54
- Label: Stmpd; Epic Amsterdam; Sony Netherlands
- Songwriter(s): Clinton Kane; Jake Torrey; Jonny Coffer; Justin Parker; Martijn Garritsen; Mikky Ekko; Oskar Rindborg; Steve Rusch
- Producer(s): Martin Garrix; Osrin

Martin Garrix singles chronology
"Hold On" (2019)	"Drown" (2020)	"Higher Ground" (2020)

"Drown" is a song by Dutch DJ and producer Martin Garrix, featuring Australian singer-songwriter Clinton Kane. The song was released on 27 February 2020. The song plays to the feeling of taking the good and bad in a relationship, knowing that as long as you're with them, you'll be happy.

== Charts ==
=== Weekly charts ===
Chart (2020)	Peak position
Belgium (Ultratip Bubbling Under Flanders)	33
Belgium (Ultratip Bubbling Under Wallonia)	25
Netherlands (Dutch Top 40)	18
Netherlands (Single Top 100)	36
New Zealand Hot Singles (RMNZ)	19
Sweden (Sverigetopplistan)	76
US Hot Dance/Electronic Songs (Billboard)	12

=== Year-end charts ===
Chart (2020)	Position
Netherlands (Dutch Top 40)	63
US Hot Dance/Electronic Songs (Billboard)	68

== Certifications ==
Region	Certification	Certified units/sales
Brazil (Pro-Música Brasil)	Gold	20,000^{‡}
New Zealand (RMNZ)	Gold	15,000^{‡}
^{‡} Sales+streaming figures based on certification alone.
