= Lost in Your Love (Redlight song) =

2012 single by Redlight

Single by Redlight featuring Lottie Tricity and Baby Sol
- Released: 2 August 2012
- Length: 3:49 (original); 2:41 (radio edit)
- Label: Polydor
- Songwriters: Hugh Pescod; Baby N'Sola; Jonny Coffer
- Producer: Redlight

Redlight singles chronology
"Get Out My Head" (2012)	"Lost in Your Love" (2012)	"Switch It Off" (2013)

Music video
- "Lost in Your Love" (Official) on YouTube

"Lost in Your Love" is a song by English producer Redlight. The track was released as a digital download in the United Kingdom on 5 August 2012, where it debuted at No. 5 on the UK Singles Chart, making it Redlight's highest-charting single. The song features the vocals of Baby Sol and Lottie Tricity.

== Music video ==
A music video to accompany the release of "Lost in Your Love" was first released onto YouTube on 27 June 2012 at a total length of two minutes and fifty-one seconds.

== Track listing ==
Digital download EP
No.	Title	Length
1.	"Lost in Your Love"	3:49
2.	"Lost in Your Love" (radio edit)	2:41
3.	"Lost in Your Love" (Mickey Pearce Remix)	5:19
4.	"Lost in Your Love" (DJ Sega Remix)	3:37
5.	"Basscone"	3:52

== Charts ==
=== Weekly charts ===
Chart (2012)	Peak position
Belgium (Ultratip Bubbling Under Flanders)	2
Romania (Romanian Top 100)	78
Scottish Singles Sales (Official Charts)	5
UK Dance (Official Charts)	3
UK Singles (Official Charts)	5

=== Year-end charts ===
Chart (2012)	Position
UK Singles (OCC)	167

== Release history ==
Region	Date	Format	Label	Ref.
United Kingdom	2 August 2012	Digital download	Polydor	
