= What You Talking About!? =

Single by Redlight featuring Ms. Dynamite
- B-side: MDMA (instrumental version of "What You Talking About!?")
- Released: 30 August 2010
- Recorded: 2010
- Genre: Dubstep
- Length: 3:19
- Label: MTA Records
- Songwriter(s): Ms Dynamite, Ian Michael Greenidge, Hugh Pescod

Redlight singles chronology
"Stupid" (2010)	"What You Talking About!?" (2010)	"Get Out My Head" (2012)

Ms. Dynamite singles chronology
"Wile Out" (2010)	"What You Talking About!?" (2010)	"Lights On" (2010)

"What You Talking About!?" is a single by Redlight featuring vocals from Ms. Dynamite. It was released on 30 August 2010 as a digital download in the United Kingdom. The song peaked at number 38 on the UK Dance Chart.

== Music video ==
A music video to accompany the release of "What You Talking About!?" was first released onto YouTube on 11 August 2010 at a total length of three minutes and six seconds. Music critics noted similarities between the styles in the video to that of M.I.A. and her protege, Rye Rye.

== Track listing ==
Digital download

1. "What You Talking About!?" (feat. Ms Dynamite) - 3:19
2. "What You Talking About!?" (Radio Edit) [feat. Ms Dynamite] - 2:37
3. "What You Talking About!?" (Accapella) [feat. Ms Dynamite] - 3:12
4. "What You Talking About!?" (Roska Remix) [feat. Ms Dynamite] - 5:55
5. "MDMA" - 3:19
6. "Chopsticks" - 3:20

== Chart performance ==
Chart (2010)	Peak position
UK Dance (OCC)	38

== Release history ==
Region	Date	Format	Label
United Kingdom	30 August 2010	Digital download	MTA Records
