= Wile Out =

2010 single by DJ Zinc and Ms. Dynamite

Single by DJ Zinc featuring Ms. Dynamite
- Released: 7 February 2010
- Recorded: 2009–10
- Genre: House, breakbeat
- Length: 5:02
- Label: Zinc Music
- Songwriters: Zinc, Ms. Dynamite

DJ Zinc singles chronology
"Drive By Car / Ins" (2005)	"Wile Out" (2010)

Ms. Dynamite singles chronology
"Fall in Love Again" (2006)	"Wile Out" (2010)	"What You Talking About!?" (2010)

"Wile Out" is a single by DJ Zinc featuring vocals from Ms. Dynamite. It was released on 7 February 2010 as a digital download in the United Kingdom. The song peaked at number 38 on the UK Singles Chart and number 4 on the UK Dance Chart.

== Music video ==
A music video to accompany the release of "Wile Out" was first released onto YouTube on 23 January 2010 at a total length of two minutes and fifty-five seconds.

== Track listing ==
Digital download
No.	Title	Length
1.	"Wile Out" (feat. Ms Dynamite)	5:02
2.	"My DJ" (feat. Ms Dynamite)	4:49
3.	"Music Makers"	6:43

=== iTunes Download ===
Digital download
No.	Title	Length
1.	"Wile Out" (Radio Edit) (feat. Ms Dynamite)	2:52
2.	"Wile Out" (Club Mix) (feat. Ms Dynamite)	4:59
3.	"Wile Out" (Marky & S.P.Y Crack N Bass Remix) (feat. Ms Dynamite)	4:59
4.	"My DJ"	4:49

=== Vato Gonzalez Remix ===
Digital download
No.	Title	Length
1.	"Wile Out" (Vato Gonzalez remix) (feat. Ms Dynamite)	6:42

== Chart performance ==
Chart (2010)	Peak position
UK Dance (Official Charts)	4
UK Singles (Official Charts)	38

== Certifications ==
Certifications for Wile Out
Region	Certification	Certified units/sales
United Kingdom (BPI)	Gold	400,000^{‡}
^{‡} Sales+streaming figures based on certification alone.

== Release history ==
Region	Date	Format	Label
United Kingdom	7 February 2010	Digital Download	Zinc Music
