= DJ Zinc =

British DJ and record producer

- Also known as: Jammin, Jack Ruby, Dope Skillz, The Phantom
- Born: Benjamin Pettit; 12 March 1972 (age 54)
- Origin: London, England
- Genres: Drum and bass; jungle; breakbeat; house; trip hop; UK garage; bassline; bass house; UK bass
- Years active: 1991–present
- Formerly of: The Ganja Kru; True Playaz
- Website: djzinc.com

Benjamin Pettit (born 12 March 1972), known professionally as DJ Zinc, is a British DJ and record producer. Zinc first became known for 1995's "Super Sharp Shooter", a hip hop/jungle fusion, notably one of the pioneering drum & bass anthems of its time. He went on to produce drum and bass, breakbeat and later UK garage and house.

== Biography ==
Zinc's career as a DJ and producer stretches the steady evolution of hardcore from its house roots through ragga and hip hop-styled hardstep and beyond. In 1991, he began his radio show with then partner DJ Swift on London's Impact FM. He continued to DJ with Swift onto Eruption FM and later solo on Rinse FM since it gained a license.

He continued to DJ on a regular basis, and was one of the first drum and bass producers to score a hit in the 2-step garage market courtesy of his 1999 single "138 Trek", which reached No. 27 on the UK Singles Chart in November 2000.

His productions have been relatively popular outside the drum and bass scene, most notably in the breaks genre under the pseudonym Jammin.

Zinc produced and DJ'd as part of the Ganja Kru and True Playaz collectives, often in association with DJ Hype from 1996 to 2002. He ran the Bingo Beats record label, which released both drum and bass and breaks records from 2002 to 2008. He has been known to release records under the alias of Dope Skillz, Jammin and Jelly Jams plus others.

In 2001, Zinc released a remix compilation album of his own productions called Beats by Design which included "138 Trek". By August 2004, he released his second album, Faster, a concept album of sorts. The album, as the name suggests, ups the tempo little-by-little for each song. The title track and album opener, epitomises this and is a grimy crawl through bass and beat that speeds up from 40bpm into the early 100s by its end.

In 2007, Zinc stopped making and playing drum and bass, citing "disenchantment with the scene". He started producing again in 2009 with a fusion of deep house, funky house and fidget house, which he believed did not fit into any of these subgenres. He later named his new sound "crack house". This style developed alongside bassline and bass house to evolve into the homogenized UK Bass music of today.

In October 2009, DJ Zinc released Crack House EP encompassing his new sound of the crack house genre. A follow-up to this EP, Crack House Vol. 2 was released in July 2010.

In November 2009, DJ Zinc created a 2-hour mix for broadcasting on BBC Radio 1's essential mix.

== Discography ==
=== Albums and EPs ===
Title	Release year	Label	Catalog
Beats by Design (EP)	2000	True Playaz	TPR 12 025 CD
Faster (LP)	2003	Polydor	986 548–8
Crack House (EP)	2009	Bingo Beats	ZINCEP001
Crack House Vol. 2 (EP)	2010	Bingo Beats	East002
Sprung (EP)	2011	Rinse	RINSE009A
Only for Tonight (EP)	2013	Rinse	RINSE020
Crack House Vol. 3 (LP)	2019	Bingo Bass	BBASS063
Friends And Fam (LP)	2020	Bingo Bass	BBASS098ISH
BASSLOVE (LP)	2024	Bingo Bass	BBASS200

=== Compilation albums ===
Title	Release year	Label	Catalog
Bingo Beats Volume 2	2001	Bingo Beats	BINGOCD002
Bingo Sessions Volume 1	2004	Bingo Beats	BINGOCD004
Drum & Bass Arena	2005	Resist Music	RESISTCD51
Watch the Ride	2007	Harmless	HURTCD073

=== Singles ===
- "138 Trek" (2000) – UK No. 27
- "Casino Royale" (DJ Zinc) / "Dead A's" (DJ Hype) (2001) – UK No. 58 †
- "Reachout" / "Pranksters" (2002) – UK No. 73
- "Fair Fight" / "As We Do" (2002) – UK No. 72
- "Ska" / "Fruitella" (2004) – UK No. 54
- "Steppin' Sones" / "South Pacific" (DJ Zinc) (2004) – UK No. 62
- "Drive by Car" (feat. Eksman) (2004) – UK No. 66 ‡
- "Kinda Funky/Go DJ" (as Jammin) (2004) – UK No. 80
- "Creeper" (feat. Dynamite MC) (2005)
- "Ghost Train" (with Dave Spoon) (2009)
- "Wile Out" (feat. Ms. Dynamite) (2010) – UK No. 38
- "Goin In'" (DJ Zinc feat. States of Emotion) / "Reload" (DJ Zinc feat. P Money) (2012)
- "Only for Tonight" (feat. Sasha Keable) (2013) – UK No. 83
- "Show Me" (feat. Sneaky Sound System) (2014) – UK No. 167

† – credited as 'DJ Zinc / DJ Hype'

‡ – credited as 'DJ Zinc featuring Eksman'
