= I Guess I'm in Love =

2021 single by Clinton Kane

Single by Clinton Kane

from the album Maybe Someday It'll All Be OK
- Released: 20 August 2021
- Recorded: 2021
- Length: 3:24
- Label: Columbia; Sony Music
- Songwriters: Clinton Kane; Steve Rusch
- Producer: Steve Rusch

Clinton Kane singles chronology
"Chicken Tendies" (2021)	"I Guess I'm in Love" (2021)	"Go to Hell" (2021)

Music video
- "I Guess I'm in Love" on YouTube

"I Guess I'm in Love" (stylised in all capitals) is a song by singer Clinton Kane, released on 20 August 2021 as the second single from his debut album, Maybe Someday It'll All Be OK.

At the 2022 ARIA Music Awards, the song was nominated for Song of the Year.

== Charts ==
=== Weekly charts ===
Chart performance for "I Guess I'm in Love"
Chart (2021)	Peak position
Australia (ARIA)	25
Austria (Ö3 Austria Top 40)	72
Canada (Canadian Hot 100)	50
Global 200 (Billboard)	61
Ireland (IRMA)	15
Netherlands (Single Top 100)	61
New Zealand (Recorded Music NZ)	27
Norway (VG-lista)	35
Singapore (RIAS)	2
South Africa (RISA)	31
Sweden (Sverigetopplistan)	70
Switzerland (Schweizer Hitparade)	83
UK Singles (Official Charts)	23
US Billboard Hot 100	90

=== Year-end charts ===
Chart (2021)	Position
Australian Artist (ARIA)	46

== Certifications ==
Certifications for "I Guess I'm in Love"
Region	Certification	Certified units/sales
Australia (ARIA)	Gold	35,000^{‡}
Denmark (IFPI Danmark)	Gold	45,000^{‡}
New Zealand (RMNZ)	Platinum	30,000^{‡}
United Kingdom (BPI)	Gold	400,000^{‡}
United States (RIAA)	Platinum	1,000,000^{‡}
Streaming
Sweden (GLF)	Gold	4,000,000^{†}
^{‡} Sales+streaming figures based on certification alone.^{†} Streaming-only figures based on certification alone.
