= Runaway (U & I) =

2014 single by Galantis

Single by Galantis

from the album Pharmacy
- Released: 5 October 2014
- Genre: Progressive house
- Length: 3:47
- Label: Big Beat; WMG
- Songwriters: Julia Karlsson; Anton Rundberg; Christian Karlsson; Linus Eklöw; Cathy Dennis; Jimmy Koitzsch
- Producers: Galantis; Svidden

Galantis singles chronology
"You" (2014)	"Runaway (U & I)" (2014)	"Gold Dust" (2015)

Music video
- "Runaway (U & I)" on YouTube

"Runaway (U & I)" is a song by Swedish electronic music duo Galantis. It was released on 5 October 2014 as the lead single from their debut studio album Pharmacy (2015). The song features uncredited production work by Svidden, as well as Julia Karlsson performing the chorus and Cathy Dennis performing two verses on heavily processed and uncredited vocals.

"Runaway (U & I)" became Galantis' biggest hit single. In early 2015 it achieved chart success on the Australian Singles Chart reaching number four, and on the New Zealand Singles Chart, where it peaked at number six. It also debuted at number four on the UK Singles Chart and has since sold over 1,200,000 units, receiving a double platinum certification from the British Phonographic Industry (BPI) in October 2021. Moreover, as of June 2025, the track has amassed over 1 billion streams on Spotify.

The song was written by Anton Rundberg, Julia Karlsson, Linus Eklöw, Christian Karlsson, Jimmy Koitzsch, and Cathy Dennis. Billboard ranked the song at number five on its "The 10 Best Electronic/Dance Songs of 2014" list. "Runaway (U & I)" received a nomination for Best Dance Recording at the 58th Grammy Awards, but lost to "Where Are Ü Now".

The song is written in B-flat minor at a tempo of 126 beats per minute.

== Music video ==
A music video to accompany the release of "Runaway (U & I)" was first uploaded onto YouTube on 19 January 2015 at a total length of four minutes and twenty-three seconds. As of June 2025, the video has accumulated over 450 million views.

== Remixes and samples ==
"Runaway (U & I)" has been remixed by several high-profile producers. Dillon Francis, DJ Mustard, Ansolo, KSHMR, Kaskade, Gioni, RIOT, Subtronics and Quintino are among the artists who have remixed the track. Dillon Francis' version in particular has grabbed the highest praise with a trap version of the song. An additional remix by electronic artists Svidden and Jarly was featured in the film Paper Towns.

The song was sampled in the Shades remixed version of Canon's "Grow Up" featuring Tragic Hero.

In 2025, American DJ Ian Asher made a remix edit of the song.

== Reception and legacy ==
In 2015, Spin named it the 88th greatest electronic dance music (EDM) anthem of the first half of the 2010s.

== Uses in pop culture ==
In July 2015, it was used in season 1, episode 3 entitled “Move the Chains”, of the HBO series Ballers, during the party scene.

The song was used in a 2016 commercial for Absolut Vodka's #absolutnights ad campaign, in the theatrical trailer and TV spots for the animated film Ratchet & Clank and in the racing video game Forza Horizon 3. The song is also featured in the dance rhythm game, Just Dance 2021.

The song also appeared in the 2023 rhythm game, Samba de Amigo: Party Central.

During the 2020 NFL season, CBS Sports used the song as transition music when cutting to commercial breaks.

The remix by Ian Asher was used in a trailer for Chapter 7: Season 4 of the video game, Fortnite Battle Royale.

== Track listing ==
Digital download
No.	Title	Length
1.	"Runaway (U & I)"	3:47

Digital download – remixes
No.	Title	Length
1.	"Runaway (U & I)" (Quintino Remix)	4:45
2.	"Runaway (U & I)" (Ansolo Remix)	5:16
3.	"Runaway (U & I)" (East & Young Remix)	4:34
4.	"Runaway (U & I)" (Kaskade Remix)	5:15
5.	"Runaway (U & I)" (Dillon Francis Remix)	3:33

== Charts ==
=== Weekly charts ===
Chart (2014–2015)	Peak position
Australia (ARIA)	4
Australia Dance (ARIA)	2
Austria (Ö3 Austria Top 40)	39
Belgium (Ultratop 50 Flanders)	6
Belgium (Ultratop 50 Wallonia)	6
Canada Hot 100 (Billboard)	96
Czech Republic Airplay (ČNS IFPI)	6
Czech Republic Singles Digital (ČNS IFPI)	70
Finland (Suomen virallinen lista)	9
France (SNEP)	23
Germany (GfK)	58
Hungary (Stream Top 40)	39
Ireland (IRMA)	6
Netherlands (Dutch Top 40)	1
Netherlands (Single Top 100)	3
New Zealand (Recorded Music NZ)	6
Norway (VG-lista)	12
Poland Airplay (ZPAV)	16
Scottish Singles Sales (Official Charts)	2
Slovakia Airplay (ČNS IFPI)	46
Slovakia Singles Digital (ČNS IFPI)	48
Spain (Promusicae)	58
Sweden (Sverigetopplistan)	25
Switzerland (Schweizer Hitparade)	42
UK Singles (Official Charts)	4
UK Dance (Official Charts)	1
US Bubbling Under Hot 100 (Billboard)	14
US Hot Dance/Electronic Songs (Billboard)	9

=== Year-end charts ===
Chart (2015)	Position
Australia (ARIA)	44
Belgium (Ultratop Flanders)	26
Belgium (Ultratop Wallonia)	30
France (SNEP)	64
Netherlands (Dutch Top 40)	14
Netherlands (Single Top 100)	21
New Zealand (Recorded Music NZ)	29
Sweden (Sverigetopplistan)	92
UK Singles (Official Charts Company)	31
US Hot Dance/Electronic Songs (Billboard)	24

== Certifications ==
Region	Certification	Certified units/sales
Australia (ARIA)	2× Platinum	140,000^{‡}
Belgium (BRMA)	Platinum	20,000^{‡}
Brazil (Pro-Música Brasil)	3× Platinum	180,000^{‡}
Canada (Music Canada)	3× Platinum	240,000^{‡}
Denmark (IFPI Danmark)	Platinum	90,000^{‡}
Germany (BVMI)	Platinum	400,000^{‡}
Italy (FIMI)	Platinum	50,000^{‡}
Mexico (AMPROFON)	Gold	30,000^{*}
New Zealand (RMNZ)	3× Platinum	90,000^{‡}
New Zealand (RMNZ) Ian Asher remix	Gold	15,000^{‡}
Norway (IFPI Norway)	2× Platinum	20,000^{‡}
Poland (ZPAV)	Platinum	50,000^{‡}
Portugal (AFP)	Platinum	20,000^{‡}
Spain (Promusicae)	Platinum	60,000^{‡}
Sweden (GLF)	2× Platinum	80,000^{‡}
Switzerland (IFPI Switzerland)	Gold	15,000^{‡}
United Kingdom (BPI)	2× Platinum	1,200,000^{‡}
United States (RIAA)	3× Platinum	3,000,000^{‡}
^{*} Sales figures based on certification alone.^{‡} Sales+streaming figures based on certification alone.

== Release history ==
Region	Date	Format	Label
Sweden	5 October 2014	Digital download	WMG
