= 138 Trek =

Single by DJ Zinc
- Released: 6 November 2000
- Recorded: 1999
- Genre: UK garage, breakstep
- Length: 5:10
- Label: True Playaz, Phaze:One
- Songwriter: DJ Zinc
- Producer: DJ Zinc

DJ Zinc singles chronology
"Beats by Design EP" (1999)	"138 Trek" (2000)	"Casino Royale / Dead A's" (2001)

"138 Trek" is a 1999 song by DJ Zinc. Released as a single in 2000 it peaked at number 27 on the UK Singles Chart and number one on the UK Dance Singles Chart.

DJ Zinc was one of the first drum and bass producers to score a chart hit within the UK garage scene with this song. He then continued to release breaks/garage productions under the alias Jammin. His 2004 release, "Kinda Funky/Go DJ", reached No. 80 in the UK. "138 Trek" samples the drum break from Barry White's "I'm Gonna Love You Just a Little More Baby".

The Guardian listed "138 Trek" at number 7 in their list of "The best UK garage tracks - ranked!" in 2019.

The track also features samples from the Star Trek original series, including the re-use of samples of the communicator sound.

== Chart performance ==
Chart (2000)	Peak position
UK Dance (OCC)	1
UK Singles (OCC)	27
