= Get Out My Head (Redlight song) =

Single by Redlight
- Released: 20 January 2012
- Recorded: 2010
- Genre: House
- Length: 3:44
- Label: Mercury, MTA
- Songwriters: Hugh Pescod, Ben Westbeech, Jonny Coffer
- Producer: Redlight

Redlight singles chronology
"What You Talking About!?" (2010)	"Get Out My Head" (2012)	"Lost in Your Love" (2012)

Music video
- "Get Out My Head" (Official) on YouTube

"Get Out My Head" is a song by English producer Redlight featuring uncredited vocals from 2009 The X Factor contestant Nicole Jackson. The track was released as a digital download in the United Kingdom on 20 January 2012 and debuted at number eighteen on the UK Singles Chart, marking the producer's first appearance on that chart.

== Music video ==
A music video to accompany the release of "Get Out My Head" was first released onto YouTube on 16 December 2011 at a total length of two minutes and fifty-one seconds.

== Chart performance ==
For the week ending 4 February 2012, "Get Out My Head" debuted at number eighteen on the UK Singles Chart as the fourth highest new entry, with first week sales of 20,746 copies. The song spent three weeks inside the top 40, falling from number twenty-three to number forty-three on the week ending 25 February 2012. "Get Out My Head" also debuted at number four on the UK Dance Chart for the week ending 4 February 2012, marking the producer's first chart appearance in Scotland and second appearance on the dance chart after "What You Talking About!?" peaked at number thirty-eight the previous year.

== Track listing ==
Digital download
No.	Title	Length
1.	"Get Out My Head" (Radio Edit)	2:34
2.	"Get Out My Head"	3:44
3.	"Get Out My Head" (Joker Remix)	4:17
4.	"Vampires"	3:00

== Charts ==
=== Weekly charts ===
Chart (2012)	Peak position
Belgium (Ultratop 50 Flanders)	46
Netherlands (Single Top 100)	67
Scotland Singles (OCC)	24
UK Dance (OCC)	4
UK Singles (OCC)	18

=== Year-end charts ===
Chart (2012)	Position
UK Singles (OCC)	150

== Certifications ==
Region	Certification	Certified units/sales
United Kingdom (BPI)	Gold	400,000^{‡}
^{‡} Sales+streaming figures based on certification alone.

== Release history ==
Region	Date	Format	Label
United Kingdom	20 January 2012	Digital download	Mercury Records / MTA Records
