= Put Him Out =

Single by Ms. Dynamite

from the album A Little Deeper
- Released: 2 December 2002
- Recorded: 2002
- Genre: R&B, soul, hip hop, hip hop soul
- Length: 3:56
- Label: Polydor Records
- Songwriters: Niomi Arleen McLean-Daley, Christian Karlsson, Pontus Winnberg, Henrik Jonback

Ms. Dynamite singles chronology
"Dy-Na-Mi-Tee" (2002)	"Put Him Out" (2002)	"Judgement Day" / "Father" (2005)

"Put Him Out" is Ms. Dynamite's third and final single from her first album, A Little Deeper It was released on 2 December 2002 a digital download. It reached number 19 in the UK singles chart in 2002.

== Track listing ==
Digital download
No.	Title	Length
1.	"Put Him Out"	3:56
2.	"Put Him Out" (J.D. aka Dready Remix)	4:01
3.	"Put Him Out" (Curtis Lynch JNR Danger Mix)	4:25

== Charts performance ==
Chart (2002)	Peak position
UK Singles (The Official Charts Company)	19

== Release history ==
Region	Date	Format(s)	Label(s)	Ref.
United Kingdom	2 December 2002	12-inch vinyl; CD; cassette	Polydor	
