= Pharmacy (Galantis album) =

Studio album by Galantis
- Released: 8 June 2015
- Recorded: 2013–2015
- Genres: Electro house; dance-pop; progressive house; big room house
- Length: 49:24
- Labels: Big Beat; Atlantic
- Producers: Christian Karlsson; Linus Eklöw; Svidden; The Young Professionals; East & Young; Vincent Pontare

Galantis chronology
Galantis (2014)	Pharmacy (2015)	The Aviary (2017)

Singles from Pharmacy
- 1. "Smile" Released: 6 November 2013; 2. "You" Released: 1 April 2014; 3. "Runaway (U & I)" Released: 5 October 2014; 4. "Gold Dust" Released: 23 February 2015; 5. "Peanut Butter Jelly" Released: 20 April 2015; 6. "In My Head" Released: 30 October 2015; 7. "Louder, Harder, Better" Released: 12 February 2016

Pharmacy is the debut studio album by Swedish electronic music act Galantis, released on 8 June 2015. The album features seven singles ("Runaway (U & I)", "You", "Peanut Butter Jelly", "Gold Dust", "Smile", "Raveheart", "Tank", "In My Head" and "Louder, Harder, Better").

== Artwork ==
Overall, four "Seafoxes" are included in the album artwork. The cover features a unique Seafox, only seen on the album artwork.

The booklet features a Seafox also used for the "You" single artwork, and also appears on the cover of the Galantis EP.

The inside panel of the digipak features a Seafox used for the "Peanut Butter Jelly" single artwork, and also the YouTube audio for "Louder, Harder, Better".

Behind the CD tray is a Seafox also used to front the "Gold Dust" single artwork, and also appears on the cover of the Galantis EP.

The booklet included also includes a picture of Galantis themselves (Christian "Bloodshy" Karlsson, Linus "Style of Eye" Eklöw), standing back to back.

== Singles ==
The first single "You" was originally on their self-titled EP and currently has over eight million plays on Spotify. However, it was not intended to promote Pharmacy, making "Runaway (U & I)" the album's first official single. Galantis released the single "Gold Dust" on 19 February 2015 as the album second official single. It reached number one on Hype Machine's Popular Chart. "Peanut Butter Jelly" was later released as the third official single on the pre-release of the album on 20 April 2015. "In My Head" was released as the album's fourth official single on 30 October 2015 and "Louder, Harder, Better" was released as the album's fifth official single on 12 February 2016.

== Critical reception ==
John Cameron from We Got This Covered gave Pharmacy 3.5/5 stars, stating: "Galantis may have set our expectations a little too high with their 2014 releases" (referencing "Runaway (U & I)", 'You" and "Smile"), and added that although the album's production values were good, "most of the songs seem to lack originality". Cameron also mentioned that the tracks on Pharmacy are "not poorly done by any means – it's just that very few of the new ones are all that memorable." A more positive review came from Lucas Sachs from Your EDM, as he gave the album a "respectable 8.5/10" pointing out tracks "Louder, Harder, Better" and "Firebird" as his "two new songs from this album that stick out to me due to their excellence in production and writing." He wrote that "Louder, Harder, Better" encompasses all that Galantis stands for, and that "Firebird" was his favorite track on the album due to the nostalgic feeling in the lyrics and the added reverb on the word "bird".

== Tour ==
On 21 May 2015, Galantis began their summer festival tour in support of Pharmacy, which ended on 6 August 2015. There were 22 dates on the tour in total. There were performances in multiple continents, including Europe and North America.

== Track listing ==
Pharmacy track listing
No.	Title	Writer(s)	Producer(s)	Length
1.	"Forever Tonight"	Christian Karlsson; Linus Eklow; Jimmy Koitzsch; Henrik Jonback; Jennifer Decilveo	Galantis; Svidden	3:37
2.	"Gold Dust"	C. Karlsson; Eklow; Koitzsch; Catherine Dennis; Vincent Pontare	Galantis; Svidden	3:55
3.	"In My Head"	C. Karlsson; Eklow; Koitzsch; Jonback; Decilveo	Galantis; Svidden	3:40
4.	"Runaway (U & I)"	C. Karlsson; Eklow; Koitzsch; Anton Rudberg; Julia Karlsson; Dennis	Galantis; Svidden	3:47
5.	"Dancin' to the Sound of a Broken Heart"	C. Karlsson; Eklow; Koitzsch; Nicole "Coco" Morier; Pontare	Galantis; Svidden	3:38
6.	"Louder, Harder, Better"	C. Karlsson; Eklow; Koitzsch; Dennis	Galantis; Svidden	4:26
7.	"Kill 'Em with the Love"	C. Karlsson; Eklow; Koitzsch; Salem Al Fakir; Pontare	Galantis; Svidden	3:42
8.	"Call If You Need Me"	C. Karlsson; Eklow; Koitzsch; Elof Loelv; Al Fakir; Pontare	Galantis; Svidden	4:01
9.	"Peanut Butter Jelly"	C. Karlsson; Eklow; Koitzsch; Jonback; Martina Sorbara; Philip Hurtt; Anthony Bell	Galantis; Svidden; The Young Professionals	3:24
10.	"Firebird"	C. Karlsson; Eklow; Koitzsch; Jonback; Sorbara	Galantis; Svidden	4:08
11.	"Don't Care"	C. Karlsson; Eklow; Koitzsch; Ivo de Jong; Marc Van Osterbaan; Leon Jean-Marie; Michael Jenner	Galantis; Svidden; East & Young	3:45
12.	"You"	C. Karlsson; Eklow; Pontare; Carli Lof	Galantis; Pontare	3:41
13.	"Water"	C. Karlsson; Eklow; Koitzsch; Andrew Jackson; Timothy Gordine	Galantis; Svidden	3:40

Notes

- Track 1 features vocals from Jennifer Decilveo and Stephen Simmonds.
- Tracks 2, 7 and 12 feature vocals solely from Vincent Pontare.
- Track 3 features Vincent Pontare and Jennifer Decilveo.
- Track 4 features Cathy Dennis and Julia Karlsson.
- Track 5 features from Nicole "Coco" Morier and Vincent Pontare.
- Track 6 features from Cathy Dennis.
- Track 8 features vocals from Blackbear and Vincent Pontare.
- Track 9 samples the 1974 song "Kiss My Love Goodbye" by Bettye Swann.
- Track 9 features vocals from Christian Karlsson and Linus Eklöw (both members of Galantis) and Martina Sorbara from Dragonette.
- Track 10 features vocals from Dragonette and Cathy Dennis.
- Track 11 features vocals from Leon Jean-Marie.
- Track 13 features vocals from Andrew Jackson.

== Charts ==
=== Weekly charts ===
Weekly chart performance for Pharmacy
Chart (2015)	Peak position
Australian Albums (ARIA)	38
Belgian Albums (Ultratop Flanders)	128
Canadian Albums (Billboard)	98
Belgian Albums (Ultratop Wallonia)	136
Dutch Albums (Album Top 100)	48
Finnish Albums (Suomen virallinen lista)	44
New Zealand Albums (RMNZ)	33
Norwegian Albums (VG-lista)	15
Scottish Albums (Official Charts)	47
Swedish Albums (Sverigetopplistan)	7
UK Albums (Official Charts)	71
UK Dance Albums (Official Charts)	13
US Billboard 200	45
US Top Dance Albums (Billboard)	1
US Digital Albums (Billboard)	11

=== Year-end charts ===
Year-end chart performance for Pharmacy
Chart (2015)	Position
Swedish Albums (Sverigetopplistan)	73
Chart (2016)	Position
US Top Dance/Electronic Albums (Billboard)	24

== Certifications ==
Certifications for Pharmacy
Region	Certification	Certified units/sales
Brazil (Pro-Música Brasil)	Platinum	40,000^{‡}
Canada (Music Canada)	Gold	40,000^{‡}
New Zealand (RMNZ)	Gold	7,500^{‡}
United States (RIAA)	Gold	500,000^{‡}
^{‡} Sales+streaming figures based on certification alone.
