= It Takes More =

2002 single by Ms. Dynamite

Single by Ms. Dynamite

from the album A Little Deeper
- B-side: "Dynamite"
- Released: 20 May 2002
- Length: 4:39 (album version); 4:19 (radio edit)
- Label: Polydor; Biggerbeats; P
- Songwriters: Niomi Daley; Steve Ranger
- Producer: Punch

Ms. Dynamite singles chronology
"It Takes More" (2002)	"Dy-Na-Mi-Tee" (2002)

"It Takes More" is a song by British rapper Ms. Dynamite, released as her debut single from her first album, A Little Deeper (2002), on 20 May 2002. It reached number seven on the UK Singles Chart, her second-highest-charting song on the chart. The melody is taken from the song "Chitarra romana", a popular Roman song written by C. Bruno (pseudonym of Bruno Cherubini) and Eldo Di Lazzaro in 1934.

== Versions ==
There are two versions that were released, album and radio edit. For the radio edit, Ms. Dynamite re-wrote her lyrics instead of using the censor option. On clean versions of A Little Deeper, a censored version is used, bleeping out inappropriate content. The album version was released on physical UK CD singles.

== Track listings ==
UK CD single

1. "It Takes More" (Bloodshy main mix)
2. "Dynamite" (album version)
3. "It Takes More" (Nash Band mix)

UK 12-inch single and European CD single

1. "It Takes More" (Bloodshy main mix)
2. "It Takes More" (Nash Band mix)

UK cassette single

1. "It Takes More" (clean version)
2. "Dynamite" (album version)

Australian CD single

1. "It Takes More" (Bloodshy main mix)
2. "It Takes More" (Nash Band mix)
3. "It Takes More" (Nash Band acoustic version)
4. "It Takes More" (video)

== Charts ==
=== Weekly charts ===
Chart (2002)	Peak position
Belgium (Ultratop 50 Flanders)	21
Belgium (Ultratip Bubbling Under Wallonia)	17
Canada (Nielsen SoundScan)	50
Europe (Eurochart Hot 100)	35
Germany (GfK)	53
Ireland (IRMA)	38
Netherlands (Dutch Top 40)	22
Netherlands (Single Top 100)	24
Scottish Singles Sales (Official Charts)	26
Sweden (Sverigetopplistan)	57
Switzerland (Schweizer Hitparade)	35
UK Singles (Official Charts)	7
UK Hip Hop/R&B (Official Charts)	3

=== Year-end charts ===
Chart (2002)	Position
UK Singles (OCC)	110

== Release history ==
Region	Date	Format(s)	Label(s)	Ref(s).
United Kingdom	20 May 2002	12-inch vinyl; CD; cassette	Polydor; Biggerbeats; P	
Australia	17 June 2002	CD	Polydor; Biggerbeats; P	
