= Clinton Kane =

Filipino-American singer-songwriter (born 1999)

Clinton Kane Clinton Kane Talabis Concon
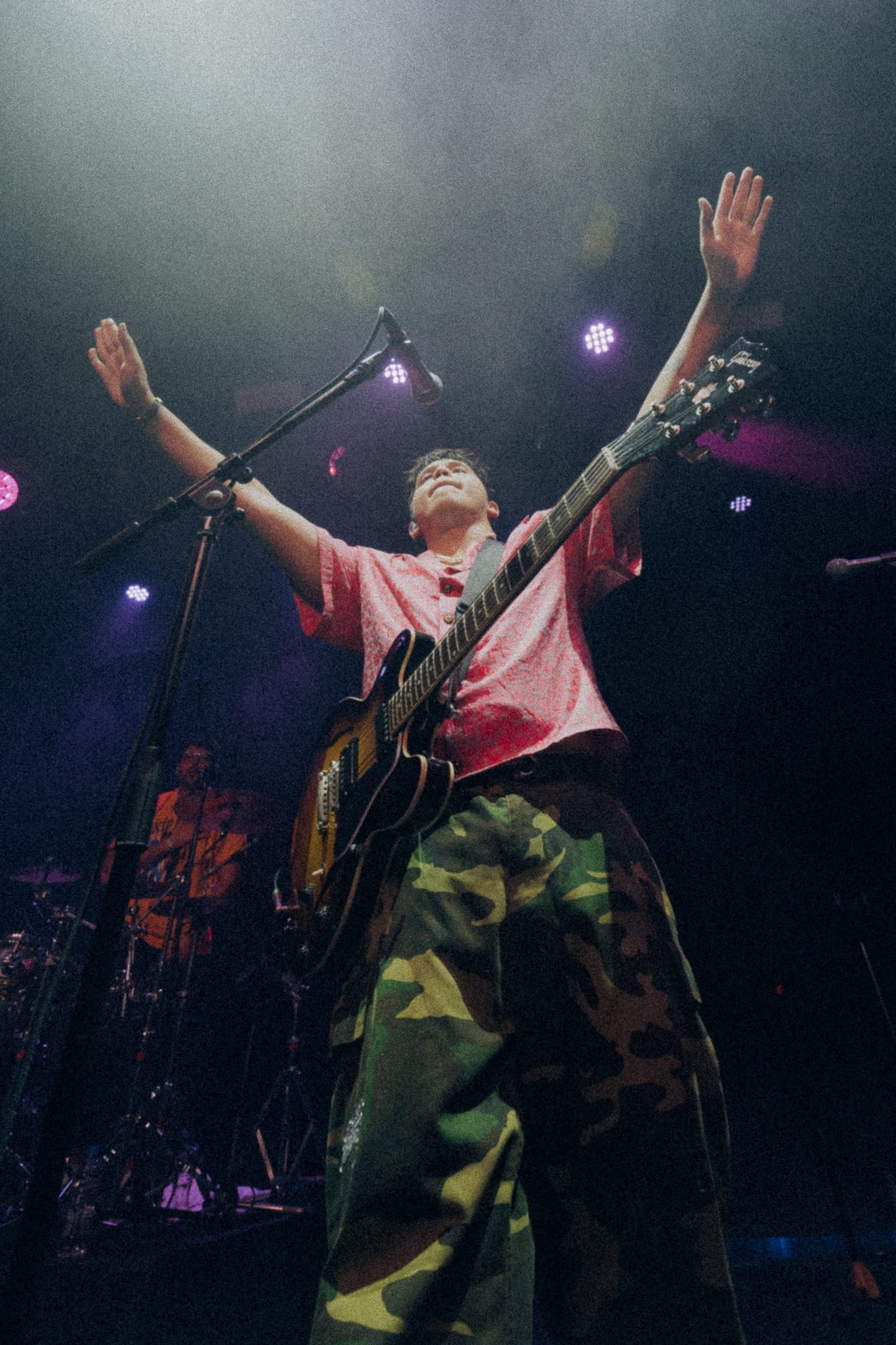
- Clinton Kane in 2022

Background information
- Born: Clinton Kane Talabis Concon; November 26, 1999 (age 26); Philippines
- Genre: Pop
- Occupations: Singer; songwriter; musician
- Instruments: Guitar; piano; drums
- Years active: 2019–present
- Label: Columbia
- Website: clintonkanemusic.com

Clinton Kane Talabis Concon is a Filipino-American singer-songwriter, signed to Columbia Records. His 2021 singles "Chicken Tendies" and "I Guess I'm in Love" reached numbers 88 and 90, respectively, on the US Billboard Hot 100, with the latter song also peaking at number 25 in Australia and number 22 in the UK.

== Early life ==
Clinton Kane Talabis Concon was born on 26 November 1999 to a Filipino father and a Norwegian mother. Kane's father, Lilioso Concon, was an aircraft mechanic of Royal Brunei Airlines and his mother, Edna Concon, was a Pentecostal pastor. Due to his mother's occupation, Kane has lived in Greece, Brunei, England and Las Vegas.

Kane is a self-taught singer and multi-instrumentalist, and grew up singing in church. He pursued a path that blended music and travel. Kane quelled growing anxiety and stress into song and in 2016, began uploading covers and subsequently original songs onto his YouTube channel.

== Career ==
Kane was signed to Columbia Records in 2019, with the label declaring the artist a "huge talent" with "powerful vocals". Kane relocated to Los Angeles and released the 5-track EP This Is What It Feels Like.

In December 2019, Kane released "So I Don't Let Me Down". Upon its release, Kane said that song is about having to accept the fact that life is constantly changing – for better or worse.

In 2020, Kane provided vocals for Dutch DJ Martin Garrix's single "Drown".

On 19 February 2021, Kane released "Chicken Tendies", which peaked at number 83 on the UK Singles Chart and 88 on the US Billboard Hot 100 chart. Kane told Billboard that the song is "about accepting things and relationships I can't change".

On 20 August 2021, Kane released "I Guess I'm in Love", which peaked at number 22 on the UK Singles Chart and 90 on the US Billboard Hot 100 chart.

In August 2024, Clinton Kane became an independent artist, parting ways with Columbia Records.

== Controversy ==
On 26 June 2024, Brooke Schofield, co-host of the Cancelled podcast with Tana Mongeau, alleged in 13-part TikTok series that Kane was an "extreme pathological liar" during their six-month relationship in 2021. Among a list of other allegations, Schofield alleged that Kane lied about the deaths of his mother and brother, of which were the subject of the lyrical themes in many songs in his discography. Schofield also alleged that Kane was never born in Australia, but is in fact from Brunei, and provided audio of him speaking privately with Schofield, notably with his Australian accent being missing. The TikTok series garnered over 50 million views in its first 24 hours.

=== Response ===
In a statement to J-14, Kane's representatives refuted Schofield's allegations, claiming:

Brooke's recent comments regarding Clinton are untrue.

Clinton was born in the Philippines, and lived in Australia for a time as a child. Despite moving frequently, he considers Australia to be his home. He has never been disingenuous about this.

In regards to his mother — Clinton was lucky enough to have a very special mother-like figure in his teenage years, who sadly passed. Clinton regrets the way this devastating news was communicated at the time. Clinton genuinely felt that he had lost an irreplaceable mother-figure. Clinton was and largely is estranged from his immediate family.

The public rehashing of these details is only an attempt to bring attention and focus on Brooke’s podcast, at the expense of tearing down another former boyfriend — a tactic she's become known for.

== Discography ==
=== Albums ===
List of studio album, with release date and label shown
Title	Details
Maybe Someday It'll All Be OK	Released: 22 July 2022; Label: Columbia; Formats: Digital download, streaming

=== Extended plays ===
List of EPs, with release date and label shown
Title	Details
This Is What It Feels Like	Released: 2019; Label: Columbia; Formats: Digital download, streaming
And All I Loved, I Loved Alone	Released: 8 December 2023; Label: Columbia; Formats: Digital download, streaming

=== Singles ===
==== As lead artist ====
List of singles, with year released, selected chart positions, and album name shown
Title	Year	Peak chart positions									Certifications	Album
Title	Year	AUS	CAN	IRE	NLD	NZ	SWE	UK	US	WW	Certifications	Album
"So I Don't Let Me Down"	2019	—	—	—	—	—	—	—	—	—		Non-album singles
"Fix It to Break It"	2020	—	—	—	—	—	—	—	—	—		Non-album singles
"I Don't Want to Watch the World End with Someone Else"	2020	—	—	—	—	—	—	—	—	—		Non-album singles
"Hopeless"	2020	—	—	—	—	— (Note: "Hopeless" did not enter the NZ Top 40 Singles Chart, but peaked at number 32 on the NZ Hot Singles Chart.)	—	—	—	—		Non-album singles
"Remember the Mornings"	2020	—	—	—	—	—	—	—	—	—		Non-album singles
"Change Ur Mind" (with Sarcastic Sounds and Claire Rosinkranz)	2021	—	—	—	—	— (Note: "Change Ur Mind" did not enter the NZ Top 40 Singles Chart, but peaked at number 29 on the NZ Hot Singles Chart.)	—	—	—	—		Non-album singles
"Chicken Tendies"	2021	— (Note: "Chicken Tendies" did not enter the ARIA Top 50 Singles Chart, but peaked at number 16 on the Australian Artists Singles Chart.)	57	—	—	— (Note: "Chicken Tendies" did not enter the NZ Top 40 Singles Chart, but peaked at number four on the NZ Hot Singles Chart.)	—	83	88	156	RIAA: Gold; RMNZ: Gold	Maybe Someday It'll All Be OK
"I Guess I'm in Love"	2021	25	50	15	61	27	70	22	90	61	ARIA: Gold; BPI: Gold; GLF: Gold; RIAA: Platinum; RMNZ: Platinum	Maybe Someday It'll All Be OK
"Go to Hell"	2021	—	—	—	—	— (Note: "Go to Hell" did not enter the NZ Top 40 Singles Chart, but peaked at number eight on the NZ Hot Singles Chart.)	—	—	—	—		Maybe Someday It'll All Be OK
"14"	2022	—	—	—	—	— (Note: "14" did not enter the NZ Top 40 Singles Chart, but peaked at number 18 on the NZ Hot Singles Chart.)	—	—	—	—		Maybe Someday It'll All Be OK
"Mexico"	2022	—	—	—	—	—	—	—	—	—		Non-album singles
"Avo Toast"	2022	—	—	—	—	— (Note: "Avo Toast" did not enter the NZ Top 40 Singles Chart, but peaked at number four on the NZ Hot Singles Chart.)	—	—	—	—		Non-album singles
"Dancing All Alone"	2023	—	—	—	—	— (Note: "Dancing All Alone" did not enter the NZ Top 40 Singles Chart, but peaked at number 22 on the NZ Hot Singles Chart.)	—	—	—	—		And All I Loved, I Loved Alone
"Bittersweet"	2023	—	—	—	—	—	—	—	—	—		And All I Loved, I Loved Alone
"Panic Attack"	2023	—	—	—	—	— (Note: "Panic Attack" did not enter the NZ Top 40 Singles Chart, but peaked at number 34 on the NZ Hot Singles Chart.)	—	—	—	—		And All I Loved, I Loved Alone
"Disappear"	2023	—	—	—	—	—	—	—	—	—		And All I Loved, I Loved Alone
"Merry Go Round"	2023	—	—	—	—	—	—	—	—	—		And All I Loved, I Loved Alone
"Tied Up"	2024	—	—	—	—	—	—	—	—	—		TBA
"I Don't Wanna Live in a World Without You"	2024	—	—	—	—	—	—	—	—	—		TBA
"Make Me Your Monster"	2024	—	—	—	—	—	—	—	—	—		TBA
"High Horse"	2024	—	—	—	—	—	—	—	—	—		TBA
"Something's Wrong With The Moon"	2024	—	—	—	—	—	—	—	—	—		TBA
"I Hate Who I Am in Love"	2024	—	—	—	—	—	—	—	—	—		TBA
"25"	2024	—	—	—	—	—	—	—	—	—		TBA
"Chinese in the Microwave"	2024	—	—	—	—	—	—	—	—	—		TBA
"Watch Me Burn It All Down"	2025	—	—	—	—	—	—	—	—	—		TBA
"Taller"	2025	—	—	—	—	—	—	—	—	—		TBA
"Heartbeat for a Home" (with Elina)	2025	—	—	—	—	—	—	—	—	—		TBA
"—" denotes a recording that did not chart or was not released in that territory.

==== As featured artist ====
List of singles, with year released, selected chart positions, and album name shown
Title	Year	Peak chart positions				Certifications	Album
Title	Year	BEL	NLD	NZ Hot	SWE	Certifications	Album
"Drown" (Martin Garrix featuring Clinton Kane)	2020	36	33	19	76	RMNZ: Gold	TBA

=== Other charted songs ===
List of other charted songs, with year released, selected chart positions, and album name shown
Title	Year	Peak chart positions	Album
Title	Year	NZ Hot	Album
"Keep It to Yourself"	2022	25	Maybe Someday It'll All Be OK

== Awards and nominations ==
=== ARIA Music Awards ===
The ARIA Music Awards is an annual awards ceremony that recognises excellence, innovation, and achievement across all genres of the music of Australia.

Year	Nominee / work	Award	Result	Ref.
2022	"I Guess I'm in Love"	Song of the Year	Nominated	
