= Peanut Butter Jelly (song) =

2015 single by Galantis

Single by Galantis

from the album Pharmacy
- Released: 20 April 2015
- Genre: Nu-disco
- Length: 3:24
- Label: Big Beat; WMG
- Songwriters: A. E. Bell; Christian Karlsson; Henrik Jonback; Jimmy Koitzsch; Linus Eklow; Martina Sorbara; Phillip Hurtt
- Producers: Galantis; Svidden; The Young Professionals

Galantis singles chronology
"Gold Dust" (2015)	"Peanut Butter Jelly" (2015)	"In My Head" (2015)

Music video
- "Peanut Butter Jelly" on YouTube

"Peanut Butter Jelly" is a song by Swedish electronic music duo Galantis featuring uncredited vocals from Martina Sorbara of Dragonette. It was released on 20 April 2015 as the fourth single from their debut studio album Pharmacy (2015). It became available on 4 April 2015 upon pre-order of the LP. It heavily features a sample of the 1974 single "Kiss My Love Goodbye" by Bettye Swann.

== Track listings ==
Digital download
No.	Title	Length
1.	"Peanut Butter Jelly"	3:24

Digital download – remixes EP
No.	Title	Length
1.	"Peanut Butter Jelly" (Jacques Lu Cont Remix)	4:46
2.	"Peanut Butter Jelly" (Good Times Ahead Remix)	5:10
3.	"Peanut Butter Jelly" (Moska Remix)	5:06
4.	"Peanut Butter Jelly" (Genairo Nvilla Remix)	4:52

Digital download – VIP remixes
No.	Title	Length
1.	"In My Head" (Misha K and Galantis VIP Mix)	4:07
2.	"Peanut Butter Jelly" (Maxum and Galantis VIP Mix)	3:58

== Music video ==
The music video, directed by Dano Cerny, was posted to YouTube on July 26, 2015, and has since garnered over 131 million views. The video shows two people (presumed to be Galantis) wearing black jackets casually walking into a supermarket as the song begins to play over the PA system. The video features Jillian Sipkins who appears as a girl on roller-skates, whom every one takes notice of. As the song's intro crescendos into the main movement, Sipkins (who is the only character to mimic the lyrics) says "Spread it like", this causes the bored customers and lethargic employees to begin to transform in both their attire and demeanor, shedding their everyday attire for more festive garments while dancing joyously, with some striking a piñata filled with money and others kissing each other. The two men then exit the store, leaving the customers and employees in a raucous party.

== Chart performance ==
=== Weekly charts ===
Chart (2015)	Peak position
Australia (ARIA)	3
Australia Dance (ARIA)	1
Austria (Ö3 Austria Top 40)	70
Belgium (Ultratip Bubbling Under Flanders)	5
Czech Republic Airplay (ČNS IFPI)	6
Germany (GfK)	76
Ireland (IRMA)	21
Latvia (Latvijas Top 40)	9
Mexico (Billboard Ingles Airplay)	1
Mexico Anglo (Monitor Latino)	11
Netherlands (Single Top 100)	81
New Zealand (Recorded Music NZ)	18
Norway (VG-lista)	17
Scottish Singles Sales (Official Charts)	3
Slovakia Airplay (ČNS IFPI)	80
Sweden (Sverigetopplistan)	17
UK Singles (Official Charts)	8
UK Singles Downloads (Official Charts)	8
UK Dance (Official Charts)	3
US Hot Dance/Electronic Songs (Billboard)	18
US Dance Club Songs (Billboard)	43

=== Year-end charts ===
Chart (2015)	Position
Australia (ARIA)	30
Sweden (Sverigetopplistan)	82
UK Singles (Official Charts Company)	64
US Hot Dance/Electronic Songs (Billboard)	39

== Certifications ==
Region	Certification	Certified units/sales
Australia (ARIA)	3× Platinum	210,000^{‡}
Canada (Music Canada)	Platinum	80,000^{‡}
New Zealand (RMNZ)	Platinum	15,000^{*}
Norway (IFPI Norway)	Platinum	40,000^{‡}
Poland (ZPAV)	Platinum	20,000^{‡}
Sweden (GLF)	Gold	20,000^{‡}
United Kingdom (BPI)	Platinum	600,000^{‡}
United States (RIAA)	Platinum	1,000,000^{‡}
^{*} Sales figures based on certification alone.^{‡} Sales+streaming figures based on certification alone.
