= Gold Dust (Galantis song) =

Single by Galantis

from the album Pharmacy
- Released: 23 February 2015
- Genre: Progressive house
- Length: 3:55
- Label: Big Beat; WMG
- Songwriters: Cathy Dennis; Linus Eklöw; Christian Karlsson; Jimmy Svidden Koitzsch; Vincent Pontare
- Producers: Galantis; Svidden

Galantis singles chronology
"Runaway (U & I)" (2014)	"Gold Dust" (2015)	"Peanut Butter Jelly" (2015)

"Gold Dust" is a song by Swedish electronic music duo Galantis. It was released on 23 February 2015 as the third single from their debut studio album Pharmacy (2015). It became available on April 4, 2015 upon pre-order of the LP. The track features uncredited production by Svidden and uncredited and heavily modified vocals from Vincent Pontare.

== Track listings ==
Digital download – Remixes
No.	Title	Length
1.	"Gold Dust" (Extended Mix)	4:52
2.	"Gold Dust" (Hook n Sling Remix)	5:09
3.	"Gold Dust" (Galantis and Elgot VIP Remix)	3:43
4.	"Gold Dust" (Yacht Club Remix)	4:38
5.	"Gold Dust" (CRNKN and Hotel Garuda Remix)	3:58
6.	"Gold Dust" (East and Young Remix)	4:53
7.	"Gold Dust" (Loosid Remix)	4:01

== Charts ==
Chart (2014–15)	Peak position
US Hot Dance/Electronic Songs (Billboard)	26
