= You (Galantis song) =

Single by Galantis

from the album Galantis and Pharmacy
- Released: 1 April 2014
- Recorded: 2013
- Genre: EDM; dance-pop; electro house; progressive house; big room house
- Length: 3:41
- Label: Big Beat; WMG
- Songwriters: Vincent Pontare; Linus Eklöw; Christian Karlsson; Carli Löf
- Producers: Galantis, Svidden

Galantis singles chronology
"Smile" (2014)	"You" (2014)	"Runaway (U & I)" (2014)

"You" is a song by Swedish electronic music duo Galantis. It was released on 1 April 2014 as the second single from their debut EP Galantis (2014). It was originally written for Britney Spears, entitled "I'll Remember You" for her eighth studio album Britney Jean but, for unknown reasons, was cut from the album and used by Galantis. The song contains uncredited vocals from Britney Spears in its chorus and Swedish singer Vincent Pontare in its verses, both modified with voice effects.

== Music video ==
A music video to accompany the release of "You" was first released onto YouTube on 9 April 2014 at a total length of four minutes and twenty-six seconds.

== Track listings ==
Digital download – Tiësto vs. Twoloud Radio Edit
No.	Title	Length
1.	"You" (Tiësto vs. Twoloud Radio Edit)	3:35

Digital download – Brillz Remix
No.	Title	Length
1.	"You" (Brillz Remix)	4:38

Digital download – Remixes
No.	Title	Length
1.	"You" (Tom Staar Remix)	6:04
2.	"You" (Wax Motif Remix)	5:14
3.	"You" (Ivan Gough and Jebu Remix)	4:37
4.	"You" (Still Young Remix)	5:53

== Charts ==
Chart performance for "You"
Chart (2014–2015)	Peak position
US Bubbling Under Hot 100 (Billboard)	19
