= Redlight (musician) =

British DJ and producer (born 1980)

Redlight/Clipz
- Also known as: CLIPZ, Clipz, Conqueror, Lobster Boy, Animal Youth, Kilo
- Born: Hugh James Pescod; 19 February 1980 (age 46)
- Origin: Bristol, England
- Genres: Dancehall, house, grime, garage, UK funky, deep house, drum and bass
- Occupations: DJ; producer; radio DJ
- Instrument: Keyboards
- Years active: 1999–present
- Labels: MTA, Digital Soundboy, Lobster Boy, Polydor

Hugh James Pescod (born 19 February 1980), better known as Redlight and CLIPZ, is a British DJ and music producer from Bristol.

== Biography ==
Redlight was brought up around '90s warehouse rave culture in Bristol.

He has collaborated with artists such as Mobb Deep and Raekwon. Remixed acts include Mary J. Blige and Tink.

With his label Lobster Boy, he focuses on music genre such as house, techno, hip hop, vocal-lead dance music, jungle, DnB and bass music. The producer releases a mix tape, Templates Volume 1. The mix tape series is about club music and is the culmination of his new production remixes.

=== Early career ===
Hugh Pescod began his career in the early 2000s under the alias DJ Clips, with a string of releases on various drum and bass labels including Full Cycle and Digital Soundboy. In 2009, he diversified his style and adopted the alias Red light, setting up the label Lobster Boy for his productions and debuting with his single "Rock The House" / "Twist Up" and the Lobster Boy EP.

The year 2010 saw the release of two dance floor recordings: the first, "Stupid" on Shy FX's Digital Soundboy, featuring the vocals of Roses Gabor, and the second single, "What You Talking About!?" on Chase & Status's MTA Records, which featured Ms. Dynamite. In 2011, Redlight released two more tracks via Digital Soundboy in the shape of "Source 16" and "Progress" as well as his second release on the MTA label "Get Out My Head". He has also remixed artists from the likes of Cee Lo Green and Maverick Sabre to Ms. Dynamite.

In 2012, he released his second single "Mosquito" / "Planet X" on the Lobster Boy imprint. His UK Top 10 track "Lost in Your Love" was released on Polydor and came with an official music video. Later that year, he has taken up the alias Animal Youth, which was used to release his remixes of the songs "Lose My Breath" by Destiny's Child and "Try Again" by Aaliyah through the single "Keep Up" / "Try Again". The single "Sixty Forty Zero" / "Crackle" was also released with this alias.

A single, "Switch It Off", was released on 22 April 2013. It was originally an independent, self-released free download before it was given new remixes by Ben Pearce and Paleman. On 10 March 2014, he released the 36 EP with appearances from Raekwon, Syron and Lotti. The title track entered the UK Singles Chart at number 81. The tracks "36" and "Get Money" were released as singles before the release of the EP and were given music videos.

He released his debut solo album, entitled X Color, on 16 November 2015.

== Discography ==
=== Albums ===
Year	Album
2015	X Colour: Released: 16 November 2015; Label: Lobster Boy; Format: Digital download
2016	Templates Volume 1: Released: 8 July 2016; Label: Lobster Boy; Format: Digital download
2018	Active: Released: 2 November 2018; Label: Lobster Boy; Format: Digital download
2021	Radius: Released: 7 September 2021; Label: Dream Vision Future; Format: Digital download

=== Extended plays ===
Year	EP
2009	Lobster Boy: Released: 16 November 2009; Label: Lobster Boy; Format: Digital download, CD, vinyl
2014	36: Released: 10 March 2014; Label: Lobster Boy; Format: Digital download

=== Singles as Redlight ===
Year	Title	Peak chart positions					Album
Year	Title	UK	UK Dance	BEL (Fla)	NLD	SCO	Album
2009	"Rock The House" / "Twist Up"	—	—	—	—	—	Non-album single
2010	"Source 16" / "Progress"	—	—	—	—	—	Non-album single
2010	"Stupid" (featuring Roses Gabor)	—	—	—	—	—	Non-album single
2010	"What You Talking About!?" (featuring Ms. Dynamite)	—	38	—	—	—	Non-album single
2012	"Get Out My Head"	18	4	34	67	24	Non-album single
2012	"Lost in Your Love"	5	3	52	—	5	Non-album single
2013	"Switch It Off"	—	—	—	—	—	Non-album single
2014	"Get Money" (featuring Raekwon)	—	—	—	—	—	36 EP
2014	"36" (featuring Lotti)	81	21	78	—	—	36 EP
2014	"Cure Me" (featuring LOLO)	131	28	—	—	—	Non-album single
2014	"9TS (90s Baby)"	59	15	126	—	—	Non-album single
2015	"Gold Teeth"	—	—	—	—	—	X Colour
2015	"Lion Jungle" (featuring Prodigy of Mobb Deep)	—	—	—	—	—	X Colour
2015	"Threshold" (featuring Melisa Whiskey)	—	—	—	—	—	X Colour
2016	"Here with Me" (featuring Tayá)	—	—	—	—	—	Templates Vol. 1
2016	"New Flows"	—	—	—	—	—	Non-album single
2017	"I'll Be Waiting" (with Liv Dawson and Kojo Funds)	—	—	—	—	—	Non-album single
2017	"Zum Zum" (featuring Sweetie Irie)	—	—	—	—	—	Active
2018	"Ride That Thing"	—	—	—	—	—	Active
2018	"So Nice" (featuring Asabe)	—	—	—	—	—	Active
2018	"Get Wavey"	—	—	—	—	—	Active
2018	"Seasons" (featuring Karen Harding)	—	—	—	—	—	Active
2019	"Sports Mode"	—	—	—	—	—	Non-album single
2019	"Charge Up" (featuring Asabe)	—	—	—	—	—	Non-album single
2019	"Fried Eggs"	—	—	—	—	—	Non-album single
2019	"Show Me" (with Flava D and Shanique Marie)	—	—	—	—	—	Non-album single
2020	"Gucci"	—	—	—	—	—	Non-album single
2020	"Phenomenon"	—	—	—	—	—	Non-album single
2020	"Dreamquest"	—	—	—	—	—	Radius
2021	"Crystal Rain"	—	—	—	—	—	Radius
2021	"Leaf"	—	—	—	—	—	Radius
2021	"Every"	—	—	—	—	—	Radius
2021	"Sweat"	—	—	—	—	—	Non-album single
2022	"Moon Trip"	—	—	—	—	—	Non-album single
2022	"On Repeat" (featuring Elf Kid)	—	—	—	—	—	Non-album single
2022	"Massive"	—	—	—	—	—	Non-album single
2023	"Regulate" (featuring Totally Enormous Extinct Dinosaurs)	—	—	—	—	—	Non-album single
2023	"Drop Down" (with Shanique Marie)	—	—	—	—	—	Non-album single
2023	"Down Down"	—	—	—	—	—	Non-album single
2023	"I Like" (Redlight version featuring KAM-BU, Lady Ice and Tia Carys)	—	—	—	—	—	Non-album single
2024	"In My Head"	—	—	—	—	—	Non-album single
2024	"Whoa" (featuring Sweetie Irie)	—	—	—	—	—	Non-album single
2024	"Walk & Skank" (featuring Specialist Moss)	—	—	—	—	—	Non-album single
2025	"Bitches Over Boys" (with AC Slater and SadBoi)	—	—	—	—	—	TBA
"—" denotes singles that were not released, or did not chart.

=== Singles as Clipz ===
Year	Title	Peak chart positions	Album
Year	Title	UK	Album
2019	"Down 4"	—	Non-album single
2020	"Again" (featuring Ms Banks, Ms. Dynamite and Jaykae)	—	Non-album single
2022	"No Time" (featuring Nia Archives, Beenie Man, Cristale and ShaSimone)	—	Non-album single
2023	"Shorty"	—	Non-album single
2023	"Uno"	—	Non-album single
2023	"I Like" (featuring KAM-BU, Tia Carys and Lady Ice)	—	Inner Untitled
2023	"Thunderstorm" (with Rudimental featuring Deyaz)	—	Non-album single
2023	"Say Less" (with Obi Franky)	—	Inner Untitled
2024	"The Touch" (with Rose Gray)	—	Inner Untitled
2024	"No One" (with Slew)	—	Inner Untitled
2024	"Not Over" (with Specialist Moss)	—	Non-album single
2024	"New" (with Chy Cartier)	—	Inner Untitiled
2024	"Meet Me at the Temple" (with Sherelle)	—	Non-album single
2024	"Tell Them" (featuring Stush)	—	Non-album single
2025	"Werk" (with Reek0)	—	Non-album single
2025	"Belly"	—	Non-album single
2025	"Bam Bam"	—	Non-album single
2025	"Maia" (with Nia Archives)	—	Non-album single
"—" denotes singles that were not released, or did not chart.

=== Produced songs ===
Year	Title	Artist	Album
2004	"Pressure Release" (produced as Clipz)	Tali	Lyric on My Lip
2007	"Gotta Keep On" (produced as Clipz)	Ben Westbeech	Welcome to the Best Years of Your Life
2007	"Pusherman" (produced as Clipz)	Ben Westbeech	Welcome to the Best Years of Your Life
2010	"Feels So Real" (as co-producer)	Rusko (featuring Ben Westbeech)	O.M.G.!
2010	"Get It In"	Jammer (featuring Camalot and Shiv Lizzy)	Jahmanji
2010	"Love Sick"	Roses Gabor	Non-album single
2010	"Selecta"	Mz Bratt	Non-album single
2011	"Where We Gonna Go"	Maverick Sabre	Non-album single
2011	"Sugar"	Ben Westbeech	There's More To Life Than This
2012	"Stars"	Roses Gabor	Stars (single)
2012	"Night Sky"	Roses Gabor	Stars (single)

=== Remixes ===
Year	Title	Artist
2006	"Hand Grenade" (Clipz Remix)	Twisted Individual
2008	"Showdown" (Note: also remixed as Clipz)	Pendulum
2008	"Where's My Money" (Clipz Remix)	TC
2008	"Squeeze Me"	Kraak & Smaak (featuring Ben Westbeech)
2009	"Back To Daylight"	Dub Pistols (featuring Ashley Slater)
2009	"Do Nah Bodda Mi"	Roots Manuva
2009	"I'm in the House"	Steve Aoki (featuring Zuper Blahq)
2009	"Remedy" (Jungle Revenge Lakota 94 Remix)	Little Boots
2009	"Shake It" (Jungle Revenge Remix)	Toddla T & Herve (featuring Serocee)
2009	"Trippin" (Redlight X-Ray Remix)	Platnum
2010	"Box of Secrets"	Zarif
2010	"Commander"	Kelly Rowland (featuring David Guetta)
2010	"T-10" (Clipz Remix)	D*Minds
2010	"Empty Vessels"	The Maccabees (featuring Roots Manuva)
2010	"Get Wild"	Kano (featuring Aidonia & Wiley)
2010	"I'm Fly"	Donae'o
2010	"I Need Air"	Magnetic Man (featuring Angela Hunte)
2011	"I Want You (Hold on to Love)"	Cee Lo Green
2011	"Live Your Life"	Erick Morillo & Eddie Thoneick (featuring Shawnee Taylor)
2011	"Neva Soft"	Ms Dynamite
2012	"Lost"	Joker
2012	"Inside My Love"	Delilah
2012	"Ready For Love" (Clipz Remix)	E-Z Rollers
2013	"Pour It Up" (Note: bootleg remix released as "Pour It Zero's") (with Seb Chew)	Rihanna
2014	"Powerless" (Redlight Animal Youth Remix)	Rudimental (featuring Becky Hill)
2014	"Sheezus" (Redlight Deconstructed Mix)	Lily Allen
2014	"Closer"	Rae Morris
2015	"Wet Dollars"	Tazer x Tink
2015	"Spectrum"	GoldLink
2015	"My Boy My Town"	Mabel
2016	"Weekend"	Louis the Child & Icona Pop
2016	"Dance With Me"	Eugy x Mr Eazi
2017	"Wet Cat (Sooo WET)" (Redlight's Damp Dog Remix)	Justin Martin
2017	"Falcon Eye"	Off Bloom
2017	"Sunrise (Refix)" (with Yxng Bane and Abra Cadabra)	Jillionaire, Fuse ODG & Fatman Scoop
2019	"No Cap"	DigDat & Loksi
2019	"Givenchy Bag"	Wiley (featuring Future, Chip and Nafe Smallz)
2020	"Again"	Clipz (featuring Ms Banks, Ms Dynamite & Jaykae)
2020	"Energy" (Clipz Remix)	Disclosure
2020	"This World" (Clipz Remix)	Everything Is Recorded (featuring Maria Somerville and Infinite Coles)
2021	"Walk Alone" (Clipz Remix)	Everything Is Recorded (featuring Infinite Coles and Berwyn)
2021	"Dream I Never Had" (Clipz Remix)	Everything Is Recorded (featuring A. K. Paul)
2021	"Patients (Fucking Up a Friday)" (Clipz Remix)	Everything Is Recorded (featuring Aitch and Infinite Coles)
2021	"That Sky" (Clipz Remix)	Everything Is Recorded (featuring Maria Somerville and James Massiah)
2021	"Burnt Toast" (Clipz Remix)	Everything Is Recorded (featuring Berwyn and A. K. Paul)
2021	"Pretending Nothings Wrong" (Clipz Remix)	Everything Is Recorded (featuring Kean Kavanagh and Ghostface Killah)
2021	"Caviar" (Clipz Remix)	Everything Is Recorded (featuring Ghostface Killah and Inifinte Coles)
2021	"I Don't Want This Feeling to Stop" (Clipz Remix)	Everything Is Recorded (featuring Flohio)
2021	"The Night" (Clipz Remix)	Everything Is Recorded (featuring Berwyn and Maria Somerville)
2021	"Lay Your Head" (Clipz Remix)	Everything Is Recorded
2021	"Outta Space" (Clipz Remix)	Stylo G & Busta Rhymes
2022	"Can't Get Enough" (Clipz Remix)	p-rallel (featuring Rachel Chinouriri and Venna)
2022	"Looking at Your Pager" (Clipz Remix)	KH
2022	"No Time"	Clipz (featuring Nia Archives, Beenie Man, Cristale and ShaSimone)
2023	"More Than Anything" (Clipz – Joy & Pain Remix)	Rudimental (featuring Emeli Sandé)
2023	"Stay Up" (Clipz Remix)	Lucagotbbm
2024	"Weak" (Clipz Remix)	Vintage Culture, Maverick Sabre and Tom Breu
2024	"Places To Be" (Clipz Remix)	Fred Again, Anderson .Paak and Chika
2024	"Situation" (Clipz Remix)	A Little Sound and Sugababes
2025	"I Need to Know" (Clipz Remix)	Denon Reed
2025	"Falling Again" (Clipz Remix)	EV
2025	"Brick Lane" (Clipz Remix)	Turno (featuring D Double E, Morrisson and Catching Cairo)

=== Other appearances ===
Year	Song	Release
2010	"Scarewear" (Rusko featuring Redlight)	O.M.G.!
2019	"Run Up" (Chris Lorenzo featuring Redlight)	Late Checkout
