= Dy-Na-Mi-Tee =

2002 single by Ms. Dynamite

Single by Ms. Dynamite

from the album A Little Deeper
- Released: 26 August 2002
- Length: 3:34
- Label: Polydor; Biggerbeat
- Songwriters: Leonard Hibbert; Niomi Daley; Salaam Remi Gibbs; Clement Dodd
- Producer: Salaam Remi

Ms. Dynamite singles chronology
"It Takes More" (2002)	"Dy-Na-Mi-Tee" (2002)	"Put Him Out" (2002)

"Dy-Na-Mi-Tee" is a song by British rapper Ms. Dynamite, released as the second single from her debut studio album, A Little Deeper (2002), on 26 August 2002. It reached number five on the UK Singles Chart that September, her highest position reached to date on the chart until "Lights On" with Katy B reached number four in 2010. The song also reached the top 40 in Italy, New Zealand, Spain, and Switzerland.

== Track listings ==
UK and Australian CD single

1. "Dy-Na-Mi-Tee"
2. "Dy-Na-Mi-Tee" (Yoruba soul mix)
3. "It Takes More" (Radio 1 Live Lounge)
4. "Dy-Na-Mi-Tee" (video)

UK 12-inch and cassette single

1. "Dy-Na-Mi-Tee"
2. "Dy-Na-Mi-Tee" (Yoruba soul mix)

== Charts ==
=== Weekly charts ===
Chart (2002)	Peak position
Australia (ARIA)	94
Belgium (Ultratip Bubbling Under Flanders)	15
Belgium (Ultratip Bubbling Under Wallonia)	16
Europe (Eurochart Hot 100)	28
Germany (GfK)	81
Ireland (IRMA)	42
Italy (FIMI)	26
Netherlands (Dutch Top 40 Tipparade)	6
Netherlands (Single Top 100)	50
New Zealand (Recorded Music NZ)	40
Scottish Singles Sales (Official Charts)	21
Spain (Promusicae)	16
Switzerland (Schweizer Hitparade)	25
UK Singles (Official Charts)	5
UK Hip Hop/R&B (Official Charts)	2

=== Year-end charts ===
Chart (2002)	Position
UK Singles (OCC)	142

== Certifications ==
Region	Certification	Certified units/sales
United Kingdom (BPI)	Silver	200,000^{‡}
^{‡} Sales+streaming figures based on certification alone.
