= Father (Ms. Dynamite song) =

Single by Ms. Dynamite

from the album Judgement Days
- Released: 26 September 2005
- Recorded: 2005
- Genre: R&B/Soul
- Length: 3:56
- Label: Polydor Records
- Songwriters: Chink Santana, Niomi McLean-Daley
- Producer: Chink Santana

Ms. Dynamite singles chronology
"Put Him Out" (2002)	"Father" (2005)	"Fall in Love Again" (2006)

"Father" is the first single taken from Ms. Dynamite's second studio album, Judgement Days. "Father" was released on 26 September 2005 as a double A-side single with "Judgement Day". The single became her fourth solo consecutive top 30 hit, reaching number 25 in the UK Singles Chart.

== Background ==
In an article featured in The Mirror in 2005, the background of "Father" was explained. The Mirror related that "Niomi and her brother Kingslee were abandoned by their father, Eyon, as young children – a painful time which is the poignant subject of her single Father... The double A-side with Judgement Day contains the hard-hitting lines: "I spent 23 years trying to be the f***ing man you should be/Taking care of your responsibility/Wanted clothes on our back and shoes on our feet/No help, but you always had your bag of weed."

Ms. Dynamite expressed, "I wrote that song a year ago, and it surprised me, the anger in the song," she says. "I have no bad feelings against my dad now. But I think it was me cleaning out any bad issue I had inside – consciously and subconsciously."

As "Father" is such a personal track, Ms. Dynamite announced that she would only ever do one live performance of it. This performance of "Father" was broadcast on Friday Night with Jonathan Ross on 7 October 2005.

== Critical reception ==
In their critique, Contactmusic.com gave "Father" a mixed review. They stated, "...if you think the lyrics are strong on that ("Judgement Day") wait till you here "Father" the second cut on the single. Lyrics like "I spent 23 years trying to be what you wanted to me be though it seemed that you never see me until I picked up the mic and I was on the TV now your ringing of my phone like every week" and "How can you call yourself a man when you can't love your own unless you can control them". Both of these tracks make great album cuts but I just think the UK will find it hard to deal with such lyrics in a pop single no matter how urban / street the artist is. Ms Dynamite is back and she is more than living up to her name via the lyrical content. The overall double A-side single was rated 3/5.

== Music video ==
Ms. Dynamite does not feature in the video for "Father". It was premiered on Channel 4 on 28 September 2005 at 11 pm and was described as playing "like a short film". In the aforementioned interview with The Mirror, the video was described as "Featuring an inner-city estate entirely abandoned by adults, it shows kids swarming over an ice cream van, smoking drugs, smashing phone boxes and being attacked with baseball bats, all through the eyes of a frightened young boy. In the final scene, youths throw a firework at a child in a wheelchair."

Ms. Dynamite commented, "I don't appear in the video at all because I wanted it to be a song related to by everyone, not just about me and my dad... Of course, it is a very personal song, but by putting all those kids in the video – black, white, disabled, able-bodied – I wanted to make it about more than just me. There are lots of kids growing up without a dad or without a mum or anyone who cares about them. I wanted to make a video for them."

== Formats and track listings ==
CD single

1. "Judgement Day" – 4:23
2. "Father" – 3:56

Digital download

1. "Judgement Day" – 4:23
2. "Father" – 3:56
3. "Self Destruct" – 4:49

Promo CD

1. "Father" (Clean Version) – 3:56
2. "Father" (Album Version) – 3:56

== Credits and personnel ==
- Lead vocals – Ms. Dynamite
- Producers – Chink Santana
- Lyrics – Chink Santana, Niomi McLean-Daley
- Label: Polydor Records

== Charts performance ==
Chart (2005)	Peak position
UK Singles (The Official Charts Company)	25

== Release history ==
Region	Date	Format	Label
United Kingdom	26 September 2005	CD single, digital download	Polydor Records
