= Neva Soft =

Single by Ms. Dynamite
- Released: 2 September 2011
- Recorded: 2011
- Genre: Drum and bass
- Length: 4:19
- Label: Relentless
- Producer(s): Labrinth

Ms. Dynamite singles chronology
"Lights On" (2010)	"Neva Soft" (2011)	"Teardrop" (2011)

"Neva Soft" is a song by British performer Ms. Dynamite. The single was released in the United Kingdom as a digital download on 2 September 2011 and debuted and peaked at number 33 on the UK Chart - marking the eighth top 40 hit for the artist.

== Critical reception ==
Robert Copsey of Digital Spy gave the song a positive review stating:

"Original bad girl pon the radar," she spits over juttering percussion and minimal D&B beats courtesy of oh-so-trendy hitmaker Labrinth, whose production is brimming with earworm hooks - including an anthemic, hands-in-the-air "Woaah-Oh" chant.

== Music video ==
A music video to accompany the release of "Neva Soft" was first released onto YouTube on 12 August 2011 at a total length of three minutes and fifty-five seconds.

== Track listing ==
Digital download
No.	Title	Length
1.	"Neva Soft"	4:19
2.	"Neva Soft" (Radio Edit)	3:44
3.	"Neva Soft" (Nu Tone Remix)	6:03
4.	"Neva Soft" (McGregor Remix)	3:54

== Chart performance ==
Chart (2011–12)	Peak position
Australia (ARIA)	58
Switzerland (Schweizer Hitparade)	74
UK Indie (OCC)	6
UK Hip Hop/R&B (OCC)	12
UK Singles (OCC)	33

== Release history ==
Region	Date	Format	Label
United Kingdom	2 September 2011	Digital download	Relentless Records
