= Judgement Days =

Studio album by Ms. Dynamite
- Released: 3 October 2005
- Recorded: London
- Genres: R&B; hip hop
- Length: 66:24
- Label: Polydor
- Producers: Bloodshy & Avant, Builder

Ms. Dynamite chronology
A Little Deeper (2002)	Judgement Days (2005)

Singles from Judgement Days
- 1. "Judgement Day" Released: 26 September 2005; 2. "Father" Released: 26 September 2005; 3. "Fall in Love Again" Released: 30 January 2006 (promotional only)

Judgement Days is the second studio album by English singer and rapper Ms. Dynamite. It was released on 3 October 2005 by Polydor Records. Chink Santana, Stephen Marsden, Christian Karlsson, and Lil Wayne collaborated on several tracks.

== Composition ==
Judgement Days is similar to Ms. Dynamite's first work, drawing inspiration from a number of personal themes in her life as a basis for humane political commentary in a climate of increasing paranoia. However, it also supposedly reflected the fact she had matured as a performer, including having performed at Live 8 earlier that year.

== Release ==
"Judgement Day" is the first single from the eponymous album and released on 26 September 2005 as a double A-side single with "Father". It reached number 25 in the UK singles chart in 2005.

The third single, "Fall in Love Again" third and final single, released on 30 January 2006. It features a sample from When I Fall in Love by Ken Boothe.

=== Commercial performance ===
Upon its release in the United Kingdom and Ireland in October 2005, the album peaked at number 43 on the UK Albums Chart, spending two weeks on the chart. It was not promoted well in Europe or Australia, and later that year Polydor officially dropped Ms. Dynamite from the record label.

== Critical reception ==
Professional ratings
Aggregate scores
Source	Rating
Metacritic	59/100
Review scores
Source	Rating
AllMusic	2.5/5 stars
The Guardian	3/5 stars
MTV Asia	6/10
PopMatters	6/10

On Metacritic, Judgement Days has a score of 59 out of 100 from seven reviews, indicating "mixed or average" reception. Jon O'Brien, writing for AllMusic, gave the album two-and-a-half out of five stars. He criticised its themes and tone, saying "the pure anger and constant preaching on Judgement Days makes you feel like you're being repeatedly battered over the head at a highly fraught protest march...overall, Judgement Days is a disappointing follow-up to its predecessor, which managed to address difficult issues without descending into self-indulgence and self-righteousness. The carefree party sound of her two-step garage beginnings seems a long, long time ago".

Reviewing the album for NME, Dan Martin wrote that "There's a fine, fine line between angry punk and sanctimonious nagging that's crossed too often here", naming "Back Then" the stand-out track because it is "gleefully nostalgic". Martin still found the beats "slick and the vocals flawless" and called Dynamite "a brilliant, precocious talent – just one moving too slowly, and in the wrong direction".

Matilda Egere-Cooper of the BBC opined that "the intensity of [Dynamite's] strop overshadows the album's lighter touches", finding it to have an "overall 'down' feel". Egere-Cooper nonetheless concluded that "Dynamite hasn't lost her values, and it's this that makes Judgement Days a worthwhile, if not entirely satisfying, album".

== Track listing ==
1. "Judgement Day" – 4:23
2. "Father" – 3:56
3. "Put Your Gun Away" (featuring Sincere) – 4:11
4. "Back Then" – 3:47
5. "Fall in Love Again" – 3:32
6. "Not Today" – 3:32
7. "You Don't Have to Cry" (featuring Lil Wayne) – 4:46
8. "Unbreakable" – 3:30
9. "Pain" – 4:23
10. "Shavaar" – 4:08
11. "Gotta Let It Go" – 4:12
12. "She Don't Live Here Anymore" (featuring Chink Santana) – 5:00
13. "Mr Prime Minister" – 4:45

=== Limited edition ===
Disc one

11. "Self Destruct" (featuring Assassin) – 4:49
12. "Gotta Let It Go" – 4:12
13. "She Don't Live Here Anymore" (featuring Chink Santana) – 5:00
14. "Mr Prime Minister" – 4:45
15. "Redemption Song" – 3:08

Disc two

1. "Judgement Day" (video)
2. "Father" (video)

== Charts ==
Chart performance for Judgement Days
Chart (2005)	Peak position
French Albums (SNEP)	72
Scottish Albums (Official Charts)	99
UK Albums (Official Charts)	43
UK R&B Albums (Official Charts)	8

=== Singles ===
"Judgement Day"
Chart (2005)
Peak position
UK Singles (The Official Charts Company)	25
