= A Little Deeper =

Studio album by Ms. Dynamite
- Released: 10 June 2002
- Studios: Murlyn Studios (Stockholm); Playpen Recording Studios, Right Track Recording (New York City); South Beach Studios (Miami Beach, Florida)
- Genres: Ragga; R&B; British soul
- Length: 61:14
- Label: Polydor
- Producers: Bloodshy & Avant; Keon Bryce; Jason "Loose J" Dyer; Punch; Salaam "The Chameleon" Remi; StayBent

Ms. Dynamite chronology
A Little Deeper (2002)	Judgement Days (2005)

Singles from A Little Deeper
- 1. "It Takes More" Released: 20 May 2002; 2. "Dy-Na-Mi-Tee" Released: 26 August 2002; 3. "Put Him Out" Released: 2 December 2002

Alternative cover
- US cover

A Little Deeper is the debut studio album by English singer and rapper Ms. Dynamite. It was released on 10 June 2002 by Polydor Records. The album won the Mercury Prize in 2002. As of September 2011, it had sold 495,000 copies in the United Kingdom.

== Reception ==
Professional ratings
Aggregate scores
Source	Rating
Metacritic	80/100
Review scores
Source	Rating
AllMusic	4/5 stars
Blender	4/5 stars
Chicago Sun-Times	3/4 stars
Entertainment Weekly	B+
The Guardian	4/5 stars
NME	6/10
Q	4/5 stars
Rolling Stone	3/5 stars
Spin	B+
The Village Voice	C+

The album was included in the book 1001 Albums You Must Hear Before You Die.

== Track listing ==
Track listing for A Little Deeper
No.	Title	Writer(s)	Length
1	"Natural High (Interlude)"	Niomi Arleen McLean-Daley, Salaam Remi	0:56
2	"Dy-Na-Mi-Tee"	Niomi Arleen McLean-Daley, Lennie Hibbert, Salaam Remi	3:39
3	"Anyway U Want It" (featuring Keon Bryce)	Niomi Arleen McLean-Daley, Keon Bryce, Salaam Remi	3:42
4	"Put Him Out"	Niomi Arleen McLean-Daley, Christian Karlsson, Pontus Winnberg, Henrik Jonback	3:58
5	"Brother"	Niomi Arleen McLean-Daley, Christian Karlsson, Pontus Winnberg, Henrik Jonback	3:34
6	"It Takes More" (Bloodshy Main Mix)	Niomi Arleen McLean-Daley, Michael "Punch" Harper	4:39
7	"Sick 'n' Tired"	Niomi Arleen McLean-Daley, Michael "Punch" Harper	3:34
8	"Afraid 2 Fly"	Niomi Arleen McLean-Daley, Hernst Bellevue	4:48
9	"Watch Over Them"	Niomi Arleen McLean-Daley	1:16
10	"Seed Will Grow" (featuring Kymani Marley)	Niomi Arleen McLean-Daley, Salaam Remi, Kymani Marley	3:23
11	"Krazy Krush"	Niomi Arleen McLean-Daley, Christian Karlsson, Pontus Winnberg, Kingslee Daley	3:44
12	"Now U Want My Love"	Niomi Arleen McLean-Daley, Salaam Remi	4:54
13	"Too Experienced" (featuring Barrington Levy)	Bob Andy	2:58
14	"Gotta Let U Know"	Niomi Arleen McLean-Daley, Salaam Remi	4:09
15	"All I Ever"	Niomi Arleen McLean-Daley, Jason Dyer, Salaam Remi, Angela Hunte, Van Gibbs, Eddison Sainsbury	4:31
16	"A Little Deeper"/"Get Up, Stand Up" (Pregap Track)	Niomi Arleen McLean-Daley, Salaam Remi	10:25

Track 13 is a bonus track on some editions, and does not appear on the UK edition.

US edition
No.	Title	Writer(s)	Length
17	"Danger"		3:14
18	"Ramp (Bonus Track: Get Up, Stand Up!)"		9:58

== Charts ==
=== Weekly charts ===
2002 weekly chart performance for A Little Deeper
Chart (2002)	Peak position
Belgian Alternative Albums (Ultratop Flanders)	36
Dutch Albums (Album Top 100)	38
French Albums (SNEP)	67
Scottish Albums (Official Charts)	21
Swiss Albums (Schweizer Hitparade)	70
UK Albums (Official Charts)	10
UK R&B Albums (Official Charts)	3

2003 weekly chart performance for A Little Deeper
Chart (2003)	Peak position
US Billboard 200	179
US Heatseekers Albums (Billboard)	8
US Top R&B/Hip-Hop Albums (Billboard)	80

=== Year-end charts ===
2002 year-end chart performance for A Little Deeper
Chart (2002)	Position
UK Albums (OCC)	52

2003 year-end chart performance for A Little Deeper
Chart (2003)	Position
UK Albums (OCC)	131

== Certifications ==
Certifications for A Little Deeper
Region	Certification	Certified units/sales
United Kingdom (BPI)	Platinum	499,000
