= Ms. Dynamite =

British rapper (born 1981)

Ms. Dynamite MBE
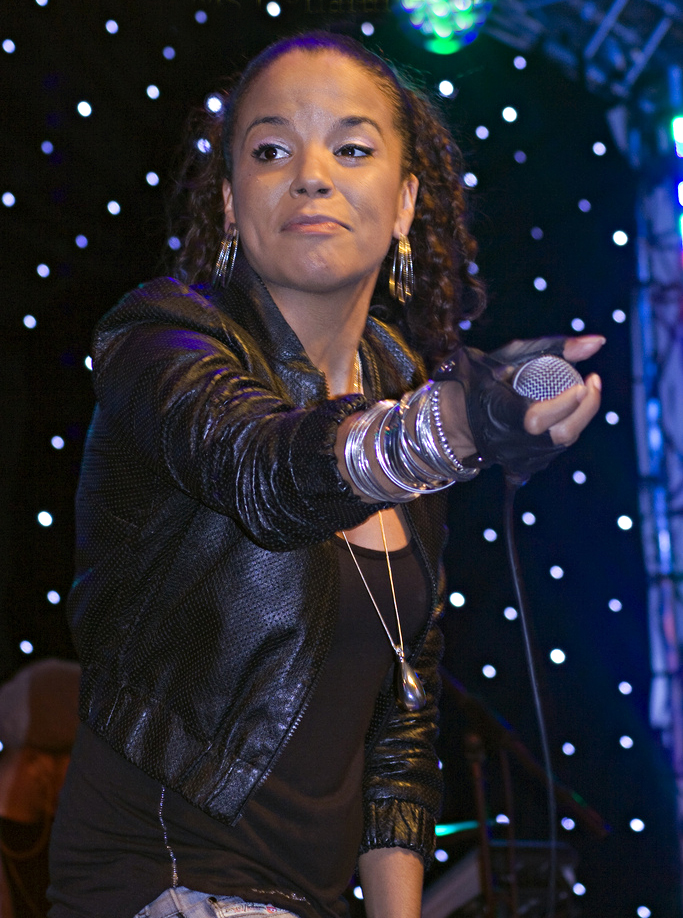
- Ms. Dynamite in 2010

Background information
- Born: Niomi Arleen McLean-Daley; 26 April 1981 (age 45); Crawley, West Sussex, England
- Origin: Kentish Town, London, England
- Genres: R&B; hip-hop; ragga; 2-step garage (early)
- Occupations: Singer; rapper; songwriter
- Works: Ms. Dynamite discography
- Years active: 2001–present
- Labels: Polydor; Relentless

Niomi Arleen McLean-Daley MBE (born 26 April 1981), known professionally as Ms. Dynamite, is a British singer and rapper. She is the recipient of the Mercury Music Prize, two Brit Awards and three MOBO Awards.

== Early years ==
Niomi Arleen McLean-Daley was born in Crawley, and raised in Kentish Town, to a Jamaican father and a Scottish mother. She has eleven younger siblings, one of which is the rapper Akala.

== Career ==
=== 2001–2004: A Little Deeper ===
Ms. Dynamite (originally Lady Dynamite) was first known for her vocals on the UK garage underground track "Booo!", which was regularly played on London pirate radio stations and was later released as a single. While working at the radio station RAW FM, Ms. Dynamite was discovered by Richard Forbes ("DJ Sticky") at a West End club. Interest grew from all major British labels and eventually she was signed via her management Bigga Beats to Polydor Records, where she met producer Salaam Remi, who cultivated her talent.

She released her debut album, A Little Deeper, in 2002, which featured hit songs "It Takes More" and "Dy-Na-Mi-Tee". In 2003, the album was released in the United States to critical acclaim. In 2002, Ms. Dynamite won the prestigious Mercury Music Prize, for A Little Deeper. She donated the £20,000 prize to the NSPCC.

On 8 March 2003, Ms. Dynamite was the musical guest on Saturday Night Live, hosted by Queen Latifah.

Also in 2003, Ms. Dynamite signed a deal to promote Pepsi, reported to be worth £1m

She performed at the closing ceremony of the 2002 Commonwealth Games at the City of Manchester Stadium. On 2 July 2005, she performed at the Live 8 concert in Hyde Park, London. Among the songs performed was "Redemption Song" written by Bob Marley, which she performed alongside her brother, Akala.

=== 2005–2006: Judgement Days ===
On 11 September 2005, she returned to the limelight (having taken time off to have her son, Shavaar) with a new album titled Judgement Days. Featuring more social commentary, in songs such as the first double A-side single, "Judgement Day"/"Father" and the Tony Blair critique, "Mr Prime Minister," reviews of the album were not as favourable as those of her debut. However, "Judgement Day" reached No. 25 in the UK Singles Chart.

In 2006, she was convicted of assaulting a police officer and was sentenced to 60 hours community service.

=== 2007–present: Hiatus and career wind-down ===
After a break from music, Ms. Dynamite guest-hosted BBC Radio 1Xtra, and said she would be releasing a third album, Democracy, in 2009, with the first single from the new album being "Bad Gyal". However, this was deferred as she concentrated on other projects and motherhood. Meanwhile, she appeared on Hell's Kitchen on ITV1 in 2009, finishing fourth, and later as an expert adviser on Goldie's Band: By Royal Appointment on BBC Two.

Since then, she has appeared on several collaborations, notably Katy B's second single, "Lights On", which peaked at number 4 in the UK Singles Chart in 2010, and the Magnetic Man track "Fire", which appeared on their debut album.

A single, "Neva Soft" (produced by Labrinth), was released in 2011, although a promised associated album did not appear. Since then she has been the featured vocalist on the DJ Fresh Versus Jay Fray track "Dibby Dibby Sound" (February 2013) and a David Guetta and Showtek song for the former's 2014 album Listen, "No Money No Love" along with Elliphant.

In 2020 Ms. Dynamite appeared on a CLIPZ (Redlight), single "Again" which also featured Ms Banks and JayKae.

== Personal life ==
Ms. Dynamite became engaged to Dwayne Seaforth, who was previously her bodyguard. She gave birth to their son, Shavaar, in 2003. The couple separated two years later.

== Discography ==
Studio albums

- A Little Deeper (2002)
- Judgement Days (2005)

Mixtapes

- A Little Darker (with Akala) (2006)

== Soundtracks ==
- "Dy-Na-Mi-Tee" (FIFA 2003 soundtrack)
- "Dy-Na-Mi-Te" (Ali G Indahouse soundtrack)
- "Dy-Na-Mi-Te" (My Scene Barbie Mix)
- "Krazy Krush" (Misfits Channel 4 soundtrack)

== Awards and nominations ==
Ms. Dynamite was appointed Member of the Order of the British Empire (MBE) in the 2018 Birthday Honours for services to music.

Year	Organisation	Award	Nominated Work	Result
2002	MTV Europe Music Awards	Best UK & Ireland Act	"Ms. Dynamite"	Nominated
2002	Mercury Prize	Album of the year	"A Little Deeper"	Won
2002	MOBO Awards	Best single	"It Takes More"	Won
2002	MOBO Awards	UK Act of the Year	Ms. Dynamite	Won
2002	MOBO Awards	Best Newcomer	Ms. Dynamite	Won
2003	100 Great Black Britons	100 Great Black Britons (rank 14)	Ms. Dynamite	Nominated
2003	Brit Awards	British Urban Act	Ms. Dynamite	Won
2003	Brit Awards	British Female Solo Artist	Ms. Dynamite	Won
2003	Brit Awards	British Breakthrough Act	Ms. Dynamite	Nominated
2003	Brit Awards	British Album of the Year	"A Little Deeper"	Nominated
2003	MOBO Awards	Best Single	"Dy-Na-Mi-Tee"	Nominated
2003	MOBO Awards	Best Newcomer	Ms. Dynamite	Nominated
2003	MOBO Awards	UK Act of the year	Ms. Dynamite	Nominated
2003	Race in Media Awards	Media Personality	Ms. Dynamite	Nominated
2003	Ivor Novello Awards	Best Contemporary Song	"It Takes More"	Nominated
2006	Brit Awards	British Urban Act	Ms. Dynamite	Nominated
