= List of songs in Rock Band 3 =

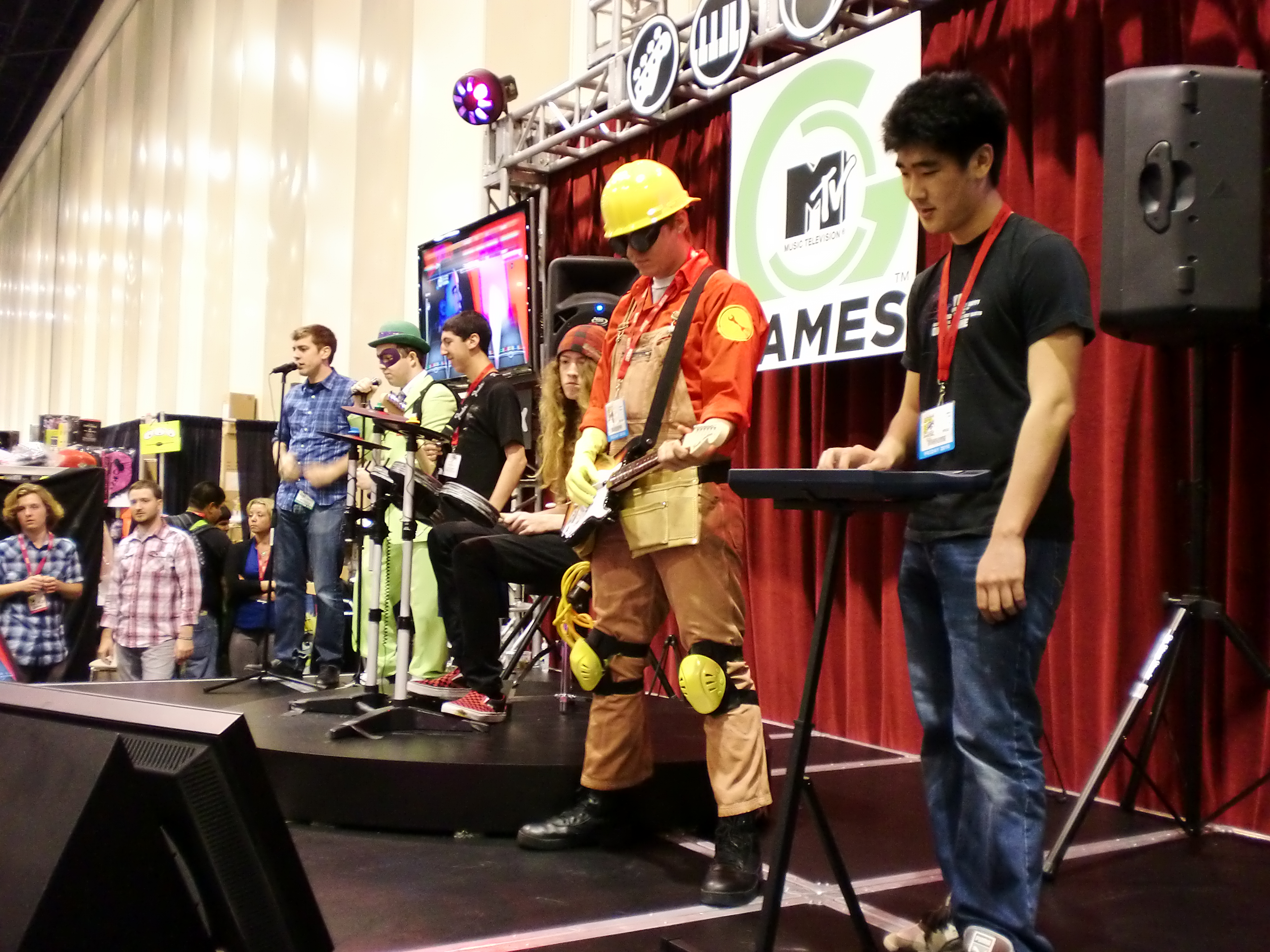
Six people playing Rock Band 3 at San Diego Comic-Con on July 23, 2010

Eighty-three songs are included in Rock Band 3, a 2010 music video game developed by Harmonix, published by MTV Games and distributed by Electronic Arts. The game, the third main title in the Rock Band series, was released in October 2010 for the Xbox 360, PlayStation 3, Wii, and Nintendo DS. Rock Band 3 allows one to seven players to simulate the playing of rock music by providing the players with peripherals modeled after musical instruments. These include a guitar peripheral for lead guitar and bass gameplay, a drum kit peripheral, a keyboard peripheral, and up to three microphones. Rock Band 3 is the first game in the series to include a "Pro" mode, which allows players to use more realistic peripherals to play the game's songs note-for-note as they would be played on an actual instrument.

All of the songs included in Rock Band 3 were recorded either from master copies or live performances. Many were included to emphasize the keyboard instrument. Existing game content, including prior downloadable content and songs from the Rock Band Network, carries forward into Rock Band 3, with the full Rock Band library consisting of over 2,000 songs by the time the game was released. When Rock Band 3 was first detailed on June 11, 2010, Harmonix announced 22 of the game's songs. The next month, Harmonix used Facebook and Twitter to provide clues about additional songs for both Rock Band 3 and Dance Central, which they then confirmed to be six Rock Band tracks and three Dance Central tracks. During a video interview at the 2010 Gamescom convention, most of the setlist was inadvertently leaked because someone was scrolling through the setlist in the background. Rock Band 3's setlist was well-received by video game critics. Eurogamer's Johnny Minkley noted the contrast between it and the heavier style of Guitar Hero: Warriors of Rock's setlist.

== Announcement ==
When Rock Band 3 was first detailed on June 11, 2010, Harmonix announced 22 of the game's 83 songs. The next month, Harmonix used Facebook and Twitter to provide clues about additional songs for both Rock Band 3 and Dance Central, which they then confirmed to be six Rock Band tracks and three Dance Central tracks. On August 17, just before the 2010 Gamescom convention, Harmonix announced an additional ten songs by bands from around the world.

During a video interview at Gamescom, most of the setlist was inadvertently leaked because someone was scrolling through the setlist in the background. Harmonix released a video response to the leak the next day, officially denying the rumored setlist, while once again showing the setlist in the background and confirming additional songs. The full setlist was formally announced on August 25 on the Rock Band website.

== Track listing ==
The full Rock Band 3 setlist features 83 songs, including a mix of tracks which make use of the new keyboard peripheral and three-part vocal harmonies. The Nintendo DS version of the game features a 25-song subset of the consoles' setlist, 16 of which are shortened from their console lengths.

Song title	Artist	Year (Note: Year of song's original release, as listed in Rock Band 3)	Genre	Family Friendly	Keyboard support	Vocal parts	Nintendo DS setlist	Rewind DLC
"20th Century Boy"	T. Rex	1973	Classic Rock	No	Yes	3	No	No
"25 or 6 to 4"	Chicago	1970	Classic Rock	No	Yes	3	No	No
"Antibodies"	Poni Hoax	2008	New Wave	No	Yes	1	No	No
"Beast and the Harlot"	Avenged Sevenfold	2005	Metal	No	No	3	No	Yes
"The Beautiful People"	Marilyn Manson	1996	Alternative	No	Yes	2	No	No
"Been Caught Stealing"	Jane's Addiction	1990	Alternative	No	No	3	Shortened	No
"Before I Forget"	Slipknot	2004	Metal	No	Yes	2	No	No
"Bohemian Rhapsody"	Queen	1975	Classic Rock	No	Yes	3	Yes	No
"Break on Through (To the Other Side)"	The Doors	1967	Classic Rock	No	Yes	1	Yes	No
"Caught in a Mosh"	Anthrax	1987	Metal	No	No	3	No	No
"Centerfold"	The J. Geils Band	1981	Rock	No	Yes	3	No	Yes
"China Grove"	The Doobie Brothers	1973	Classic Rock	No	Yes	3	Shortened	No
"Cold as Ice"	Foreigner	1977	Classic Rock	No	Yes	3	Shortened	No
"Combat Baby"	Metric	2003	Indie Rock	No	Yes	1	Shortened	No
"The Con"	Tegan and Sara	2007	Indie Rock	No	Yes	2	No	No
"Crazy Train"	Ozzy Osbourne	1980	Metal	No	No	2	Shortened	No
"Crosstown Traffic"	The Jimi Hendrix Experience	1968	Classic Rock	No	Yes	3	Yes	No
"Dead End Friends"	Them Crooked Vultures	2009	Rock	No	Yes	2	No	No
"Don't Bury Me... I'm Still Not Dead"	Riverboat Gamblers	2006	Punk	No	No	2	No	No
"Don't Stand So Close to Me"	The Police	1980	Pop-Rock	No	Yes	3	No	No
"Du Hast"	Rammstein	1997	Metal	No	Yes	3	No	No
"Everybody Wants to Rule the World"	Tears for Fears	1985	Pop-Rock	Yes	Yes	2	No	No
"False Alarm"	The Bronx	2003	Punk	No	No	1	No	No
"Fly Like an Eagle"	Steve Miller Band	1976	Classic Rock	Yes	Yes	2	No	No
"Foolin'"	Def Leppard	1983	Metal	No	Yes	3	No	No
"Free Bird"	Lynyrd Skynyrd	1973	Southern Rock	Yes	Yes	1	No	Yes
"Get Free"	The Vines	2002	Rock	No	No	3	Yes	No
"Get Up, Stand Up"	Bob Marley and the Wailers	1973	Reggae/Ska	No	Yes	3	No	No
"Good Vibrations (Live)" (Note: Track uses a live version of the song, from the album Live in London.)	The Beach Boys	1968	Rock	No	Yes	3	No	No
"The Hardest Button to Button"	The White Stripes	2003	Rock	No	No	1	Shortened	No
"Heart of Glass"	Blondie	1978	New Wave	No	Yes	2	No	No
"Here I Go Again"	Whitesnake	1987	Metal	Yes	Yes	2	Shortened	Yes
"Hey Man, Nice Shot"	Filter	1995	Alternative	No	No	1	No	No
"Humanoid"	Tokio Hotel	2009	Pop-Rock	No	Yes	3	Shortened	No
"I Can See for Miles"	The Who	1967	Classic Rock	No	No	3	No	Yes
"I Got You (I Feel Good)" (Note: Track uses an alternate studio version of the song, found on the album Sex Machine Today)	James Brown	1974	R&B/Soul/Funk	Yes	Yes	1	No	No
"I Love Rock N' Roll"	Joan Jett & The Blackhearts	1981	Punk	No	Yes	2	Yes	No
"I Need to Know"	Tom Petty and the Heartbreakers	1978	Classic Rock	No	Yes	2	No	No
"I Wanna Be Sedated"	Ramones	1978	Punk	No	No	1	No	Yes
"Imagine" (Note: Song has no Guitar or Pro Guitar part.)	John Lennon	1971	Classic Rock	No	Yes	1	No	No
"In a Big Country"	Big Country	1983	New Wave	No	Yes	3	No	Yes
"In the Meantime"	Spacehog	1995	Alternative	Yes	Yes	3	No	No
"Jerry Was a Race Car Driver"	Primus	1991	Alternative	No	No	1	No	No
"Just Like Heaven"	The Cure	1987	New Wave	No	Yes	2	Shortened	No
"Killing Loneliness"	HIM	2005	Alternative	No	Yes	3	No	No
"The Killing Moon"	Echo & the Bunnymen	1984	New Wave	No	Yes	1	No	No
"King George"	Dover	2001	Rock	Yes	No	3	No	No
"Lasso"	Phoenix	2009	Alternative	Yes	No	1	Yes	No
"Last Dance"	The Raveonettes	2009	Indie Rock	No	Yes	3	No	No
"Living in America"	The Sounds	2002	New Wave	No	Yes	2	No	No
"Llama"	Phish	1992	Rock	No	Yes	3	No	No
"The Look"	Roxette	1988	Pop-Rock	Yes	Yes	3	Shortened	No
"Low Rider"	WAR	1975	R&B/Soul/Funk	No	Yes	1	No	Yes
"Me Enamora"	Juanes	2007	Pop-Rock	No	Yes	3	No	No
"Midlife Crisis"	Faith No More	1992	Alternative	No	Yes	3	Shortened	No
"Misery Business"	Paramore	2007	Pop-Rock	No	No	3	Yes	Yes
"Need You Tonight"	INXS	1987	Pop-Rock	No	Yes	3	Yes	No
"No One Knows"	Queens of the Stone Age	2002	Rock	No	No	3	No	Yes
"Oh My God"	Ida Maria	2008	Alternative	No	Yes	3	Shortened	No
"One Armed Scissor"	At the Drive-In	2000	Alternative	No	No	2	No	No
"Outer Space" (Note: Song was re-recorded by the original artist for use in the game.)	The Muffs	1997	Pop-Rock	No	No	3	No	No
"Oye Mi Amor"	Maná	1992	Pop-Rock	No	Yes	2	No	No
"Plush"	Stone Temple Pilots	1992	Alternative	No	No	1	No	Yes
"Portions for Foxes"	Rilo Kiley	2004	Indie Rock	No	Yes	3	Shortened	No
"The Power of Love"	Huey Lewis and the News	1985	Rock	Yes	Yes	3	No	No
"Radar Love"	Golden Earring	1973	Classic Rock	No	Yes	3	No	No
"Rainbow in the Dark"	Dio	1983	Metal	No	Yes	2	No	Yes
"Rehab"	Amy Winehouse	2006	R&B/Soul/Funk	No	Yes	3	No	Yes
"Rock Lobster"	The B-52's	1979	New Wave	Yes	Yes	3	Shortened	No
"Roundabout"	Yes	1971	Prog	Yes	Yes	3	Shortened	Yes
"Saturday Night's Alright for Fighting"	Elton John	1973	Classic Rock	No	Yes	1	No	Yes
"Sister Christian"	Night Ranger	1983	Rock	Yes	Yes	3	Shortened	No
"Smoke on the Water"	Deep Purple	1972	Classic Rock	No	Yes	2	No	No
"Something Bigger, Something Brighter"	Pretty Girls Make Graves	2003	Indie Rock	No	Yes	2	No	No
"Space Oddity"	David Bowie	1969	Glam	Yes	Yes	3	No	Yes
"Stop Me If You Think You've Heard This One Before"	The Smiths	1987	Alternative	No	Yes	1	No	No
"This Bastard's Life"	Swingin' Utters	1998	Punk	No	Yes	3	No	No
"Viva la Resistance"	Hypernova	2010	Indie Rock	No	No	2	No	No
"Walk of Life"	Dire Straits	1985	Rock	Yes	Yes	3	No	No
"Walkin' on the Sun"	Smash Mouth	1997	Pop-Rock	No	Yes	2	Yes	No
"Werewolves of London"	Warren Zevon	1978	Classic Rock	No	Yes	1	No	No
"Whip It"	Devo	1980	New Wave	Yes	Yes	2	No	No
"Yoshimi Battles the Pink Robots Pt. 1"	The Flaming Lips	2002	Alternative	Yes	Yes	3	No	No

All 83 songs from the Rock Band 3 setlist can be exported into Rock Band 4, as of early December 2015, as long as the player has previously played Rock Band 3 on the same store account for Xbox Live or PlayStation Network. As of December 2020, all 83 songs are no longer able to be exported into Rock Band 4, with some becoming available as Rock Band Rewind DLC instead.

== Downloadable songs ==
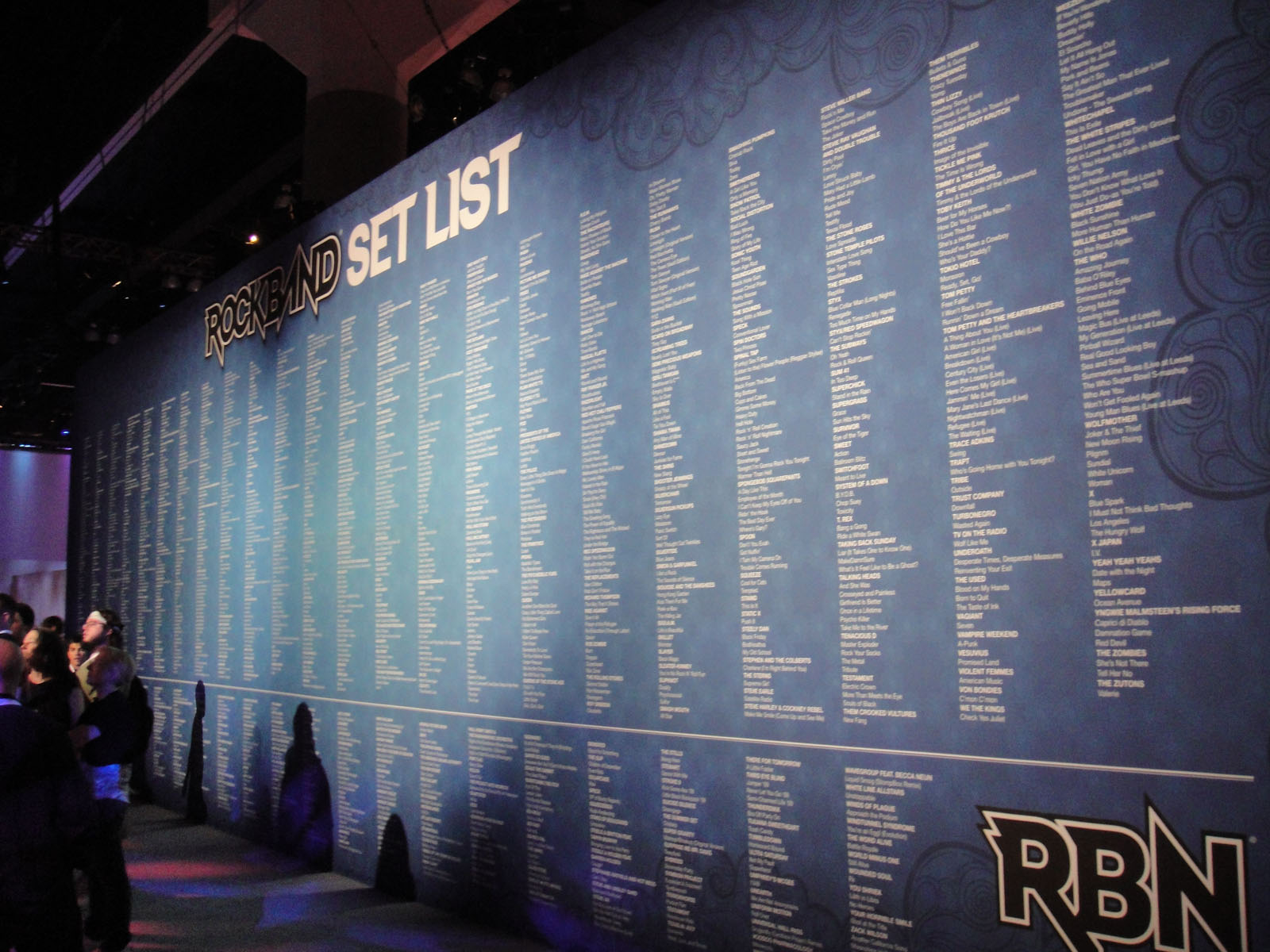
A list of Rock Band songs displayed on the wall at E3 2010. The upper part of the wall lists songs released by Harmonix, either on a game disc or as downloadable content. The lower part shows Rock Band Network songs.

Following the release of Rock Band 3, Harmonix has kept up their commitment to releasing weekly downloadable content for the series, starting with a set of twelve songs from the Doors released the same week as the game. Downloadable songs since the game's release include, when appropriate, support for keyboards and vocal harmonies within the base cost of the song. However, due to the cost and effort to create Pro Guitar and Pro Bass authoring, Harmonix releases these additional authored parts as a separate download for certain songs for US$1 per upgrade, in addition to the song's base price. Downloaded content released by Harmonix after Rock Band 3's release is not compatible with previous games in the series due to changes in the song format. Since the game's release, Harmonix has released downloadable songs from a variety of artists, including Bon Jovi, Queen, Billy Joel, Linkin Park, and the Clash.

Most songs already released as downloadable content for the series can be used in Rock Band 3, with the exception of the tracks "Hier Kommt Alex" by Die Toten Hosen, and "Rock 'n' Roll Star" by Oasis. In addition, the songs from many previous Rock Band games can be exported for use in Rock Band 3. More than 2000 potential songs were available at the game's launch between these sources.

Rock Band Network songs are also playable in Rock Band 3. A new version of the Network, called Rock Band Network 2.0, allows songs to be authored with harmonies, Basic and Pro Keys, and Pro Drums, but does not support Pro Guitar and Pro Bass charting due to the complexity of authoring those parts and the number of users able to test them.

== Reception ==
Rock Band 3's setlist was well-received by video game critics. Eurogamer's Johnny Minkley called it "strong and varied", and noted the contrast between it and the heavier style of Guitar Hero: Warriors of Rock's setlist. Will Tuttle of GameSpy praised it as being "the most diverse track list in the franchise's history." G4 TV's Stephen Johnson noted that the addition of the keyboard controller led to the setlist having a more pop-oriented style than the previous games in the series, and he said that Harmonix chose "substance ... over flashy, current bands." Reviewer Ben Kuchera, of Ars Technica, also praised the setlist's variety, stating that it is "one of the best you'll see in rhythm games, spanning decades and genres and bringing a wide variety of songs to suit any taste." In his review of the game in The Atlantic, Sam Machkovech summed up the setlist by saying that "with keyboards are in [sic] the mix, the songs are just plain better."
