= Andreas Nilsson (film director) =

Swedish film director

Andreas Nilsson is an artist and director based in Malmö, Sweden, best known for The Epic Split, a Volvo advert, and his contributions to the music videos of 2 Chainz, The Knife, Fever Ray, MGMT, Goldfrapp, José González, White Lies, Peter, Björn & John, Moby and Bright Eyes.

== Videography ==
=== 2013 ===
- "Epic Split" for the Volvo Trucks Live Test 6", featuring Jean-Claude Van Damme
- "Play Hard" - David Guetta featuring Ne-Yo and Akon

=== 2012 ===
- "Birthday Song" - 2 Chainz
- "Paddling Out" - Miike Snow
- "The Wave" - Miike Snow

=== 2010 ===
- "Madder Red" - Yeasayer
- "Rabbit" - Miike Snow
- "Flash Delirium" - MGMT
- "Trigger Happy Hands" - Placebo

=== 2009 ===
- "This Must Be It" - Röyksopp
- "Stranger Than Kindness" - Fever Ray
- "It Don't Move Me" - Peter, Björn & John
- "Nothing to Worry About" - Peter, Björn & John
- "If I Had a Heart" - Fever Ray

=== 2008 ===
- "To Lose My Life" - White Lies
- "I love the rain" - Yo Gabba Gabba
- "Death" - White Lies
- "Boo boo goo goo" - Caesars
- "Winner" - Swingfly & Ebbot
- "There is no light" - Wildbirds & Peacedrums
- "Look away Lucifer" - Madrugada
- "Alice" - Moby

=== 2007 ===
- "Oh My God" - Ida Maria
- "Step out of the shade" - Perishers
- "If I dont live today, then I might be here tomorrow" - Mando Diao
- "Teardrops" - José González
- "No Tomorrow" - Caesars
- "Killing for love" - José González
- "Down the Line" - José González
- "The Cannibal Hiking Disaster" - Alterkicks
- "Saturday Waits" - Loney, Dear
- "Clairaudients" - Bright Eyes
- "Office Boy" - Bonde do Rolê
- "Malmö beach night" - Slagsmålsklubben
- "Tänk om himmlens alla stjärnor" - Hans Appelqvist
- "Im John" - Loney, Dear

=== 2006 ===
- "Ageing has never been his friend" - Love Is All
- "Martyr" - Depeche Mode
- "White on white crime" - Jai Alai Savant
- "Make out, fall out, make up" - Love Is All
- "Like a pen" - The Knife
- "Put your hands on your heart" - José González
- "Free" - OSI
- "We're from Barcelona" - I'm from Barcelona
- "Silent Shout" - The Knife

=== 2005 ===
- "Let my shoes lead me forward" - Jenny Wilson
- "Fly Me Away" - a short film, collaboration with Goldfrapp
- "Black Refugee" - Junip
- "Paper Tigers" - Caesars

=== 2004 ===
- "Heading for a Breakdown" - The Soundtrack of Our Lives
- "Nurse Hands" - Isolation Years
- "Big Time" - The Soundtrack of Our Lives
- "Young&Armed" - The Plan
- "Benjamin" - Melpo Mene
- "Tuffa tider/På en sten, vid en sjö i en skog" - Gyllene Tider
- "The Wild" - Kristofer Åström
- "Gröna linjen" - Alf
- "Mothers" - Melpo Mene
- "Twenty-two" - Bad Cash Quartet

=== 2003 ===
- "Heartbeats" - The Knife
- "Alla sagor har ett slut" - Sagor & Swing
- "Walk" - Erik DeVahl

=== 2001 ===
- "N.Y. Hotel" (with Andreas Korsár) - The Knife
