= The Wave (Miike Snow song) =

Single by Miike Snow

from the album Happy to You
- Released: 14 May 2012
- Genre: Electropop
- Length: 3:43
- Label: Axtone; Columbia; Downtown; Universal Republic
- Songwriters: Christian Karlsson; Pontus Winnberg; Andrew Wyatt
- Producer: Miike Snow

Miike Snow singles chronology
"Paddling Out" (2012)	"The Wave" (2012)	"Pretender" (2012)

"The Wave" is a song performed by Swedish indie pop band Miike Snow. It was released as the second single from the band's second studio album Happy to You (2012) on 14 May 2012, through Axtone, Columbia, Downtown and Universal Republic. The song was written and produced by the band. Musically, "The Wave" is an electropop song with marching band influences and autoharp, military drum and piano instrumentation. It features Swedish musician Gustav Ejstes on autoharp and the Swedish Army drum corps on military drums.

The song received generally positive reviews from music critics, who commended its catchiness and musical direction. However, some critics were divided regarding lead singer Andrew Wyatt's falsetto vocals. The single failed to match the commercial performance of Happy to You's lead single "Paddling Out"; it charted on the Dutch Tipparade chart at number 21 and the Flemish Ultratip chart at number 43. Andreas Nilsson directed the single's accompanying music video, the second part in a continuous story that began in the "Paddling Out" video.

== Background and release ==
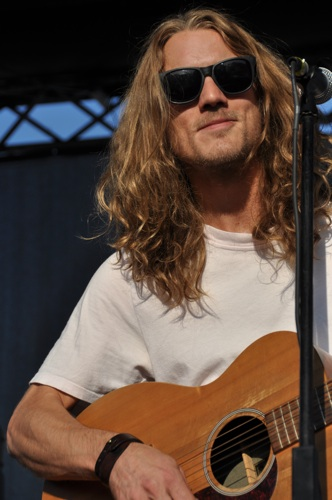
Gustav Ejstes of Dungen played the autoharp on the track.

"The Wave" was written and produced by Miike Snow's three members: Christian Karlsson, Pontus Winnberg and Andrew Wyatt. The song was recorded alongside the rest of their second studio album Happy to You (2012) during the second half of 2011. The band had more "creative freedom" while making the album, compared to their 2009 self-titled debut album. They felt they could "plan the process more", which included inviting the Swedish Army drum corps to play military drums on several tracks, such as "The Wave". Karlsson told Billboard that his favorite part of the song occurs during the second verse, in which all band members are hitting the drums simultaneously. "We hit anything we could hit at the same time ... and it sounded kind of cool", he said. Nils Törnqvist is credited for playing the drums, while David Lindberg, Jonathan Lundberg and Claes Malmberg played the military drums. Swedish musician Gustav Ejstes of band Dungen played the autoharp, and the band provided additional instruments, arrangement and programming. Niklas Flyckt mixed the track at Robotberget, Miike Snow's own studio in Stockholm, Sweden.

The song was selected as the second single from Happy to You. Initially, Thomas Gold's remix was released exclusively on the online music store Beatport on 14 May 2012, through Axwell's record label Axtone. A mere week later, a digital extended play (EP) was released in Europe through Columbia. The release features the radio edit of the original song and remixes by Gold, Brodinski and Style of Eye. The EP was released in the United States on 12 June 2012, through Universal Republic and Downtown.

Prior to the release of both their second album and single, the band announced in February 2012 that they were going to play two UK shows in London and Manchester. For their show at the O2 Academy Brixton in London, the band launched an interactive video of their performance of "The Wave" in which viewers could choose from where in the venue they could experience the show.

== Composition ==
"The Wave"
A 22-second sample of "The Wave", showcasing the "marching band vibe" and piano instrumentation.

"The Wave" is a piano-based electropop song with a "marching band vibe". Chris Schulz of The New Zealand Herald described it as an "electro-anthem" with a "skittery dubstep throb". Instrumentation is provided by an autoharp, drums, handclaps, military drums, percussion and a piano. In an interview for Complex, Wyatt said that the song is built in "tsunami form", stating that "the real pay-off" does not come until the final refrain. According to critic Josh Modell of Spin, the song "dips its toes in the kind of Brit-rock purveyed by Elbow but mixes in some organic, tribal fun à la Yeasayer". Wyatt sings with falsetto vocals, which Chris Martins of The A.V. Club thought recalled a "sad-faced" Peter Gabriel. In the chorus, Wyatt sings, "My love won't be saved / We'll all be staring at the wave". Winnberg told Billboard that "The Wave" "kind of sums up a lot what Miike Snow is about".

== Reception ==
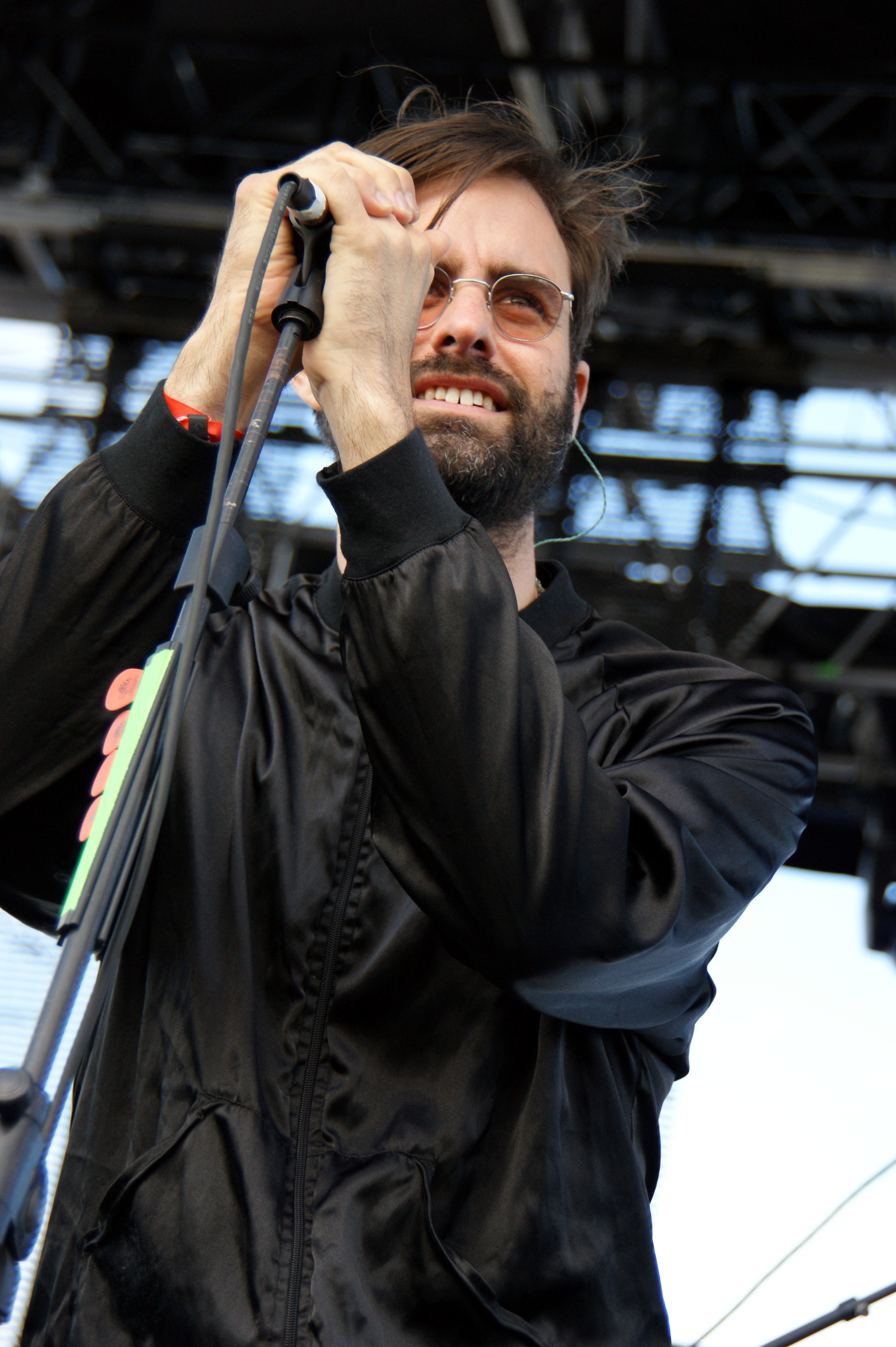
Critics were divided regarding lead singer Andrew Wyatt's vocal performance on "The Wave".

Critical reception of "The Wave" was generally positive. Adam Markovitz of Entertainment Weekly named it one of the best tracks on Happy to You, while Will Salmon of Clash and Amber Genuske of HuffPost called it a standout. Exclaim!'s Ashley Hampson deemed it "incredibly catchy", writing that it "capitalize[s] on the falsetto musings of vocalist Andrew Wyatt". Andy Baber of musicOMH described the track as "much more like the Miike Snow that many came to know and love". The writer praised the piano and marching drums for "giving the song a sense of direction that the opener lacked". Caroline Sullivan, writing for The Guardian, commented that "a martial beat, contrastingly languid vocals and a snaggy hookline give 'The Wave' a toothsome kick", and Slant Magazine's Kevin Liedel wrote that the beat "succeeds".

Chris Schulz of The New Zealand Herald said that the song, alongside the album tracks "Paddling Out" and "Bavarian #1 (Say You Will)", "will swirl around in your head for days and demand repeat plays". Spin's Josh Modell named it a highlight of the album; he wrote that if the album as a whole sounded like "The Wave", "it could fill arenas". Chris Martins of The A.V. Club wrote, "Though Wyatt's vocals recall a sad-faced Peter Gabriel, the song is steeped in the kind of effervescent magic that makes Lykke Li and Peter Bjorn and John stars in their own right." Evan Sawdey of PopMatters was critical of Wyatt's vocal performance; he wrote that "we really get a sense of how Wyatt's voice hinders the group". He said that the singer intones the lyrics "somewhat abstractly, but with absolutely no sense of gravity to be found in his voice at all".

In the Netherlands, "The Wave" entered the Tipparade chart of the Dutch Top 40 at number 30 on 21 April 2012. It peaked at number 21 and remained on the chart for five weeks. The single also charted on the Flemish Ultratip chart in Belgium; it debuted at number 84 in the issue dated 30 June 2012. The following week, the single rose 12 positions to number 72, and to number 54 the next. In the issue dated 28 July 2012, its fifth and final week on the chart, it obtained its peak position of number 43.

== Music video ==
Andreas Nilsson directed the music video for "The Wave", a continuation of the video for Happy to You's lead single "Paddling Out". Picking up where the first part left of, the video follows Jean Noel, a human man who has received plastic surgery from aliens to be transformed into the "perfect specimen". In an interview for The Creators Project, Nilsson explained how the videos were conceptualized: "The concept of this was born after long evenings of me and the band talking about gene technology in contemporary science. We share a mutual excitement in what's happening on the medical scene right now." "The Wave" was filmed before "Paddling Out", although the latter was released first. Wyatt explained to Billboard, "We really liked [director] Andreas's images and I think they go together in a way that feels truthful with what we do ... and you can read into it in different ways."

The video for "The Wave" begins with the aliens' spaceship crashing to Earth. The camera then hovers over a playground where dozens of children appear to be dead. Several policemen arrive at the scene and begin to remove the bodies by putting them in wheelbarrows. Meanwhile, Jean Noel is seen running on a desert road. The policemen then begin to dig graves for the corpses. Jean Noel then spots another specimen who looks just like him and the two begin to run. They are soon joined by more specimens before arriving at the playground. By chanting at the policemen, the specimens appear to mind control them into dance. Jean Noel continues to run and stops when he sees the crashed spaceship. The video ends with the band's jackalope logo.

The video was made available for download through the iTunes Store on 13 March 2012, in conjunction with the digital release of Happy to You. It later premiered on YouTube on 14 March 2012. It received generally positive reviews. Amber Genuske of The Huffington Post stated that it lacked a plotline, but praised its production. Tom Breihan of Stereogum called it "slapsticky absurdism" and wrote, "I don't think it's supposed to be depressing, but it totally is."

== Track listing ==
- Beatport remix download
1. "The Wave" (Thomas Gold remix) – 6:35
- Digital EP
1. "The Wave" (radio edit) – 3:36
2. "The Wave" (Thomas Gold mix) – 6:35
3. "The Wave" (Brodinski remix) – 5:00
4. "The Wave" (Style of Eye remix) – 5:01

== Credits and personnel ==
- Songwriting – Christian Karlsson, Pontus Winnberg, Andrew Wyatt
- Production, arrangement and recording – Miike Snow
- Additional recording – Nille Perned
- Mixing – Niklas Flyckt
- Mastering – Ted Jensen
- Instruments, programming and vocals – Miike Snow
- Autoharp – Gustav Ejstes
- Drums – Nils Törnqvist
- Field drums – David Lindberg, Jonathan Lundberg, Claes Malmberg

Credits are adapted from the Happy to You liner notes.

== Charts ==
Chart (2012)	Peak position
Belgium (Ultratip Bubbling Under Flanders)	43
Netherlands Tipparade (Dutch Top 40)	21

== Release history ==
Country	Date	Format	Label	Ref.
Worldwide (Beatport)	14 May 2012	Remix download	Axtone	
Europe	20 May 2012	Digital EP	Columbia	
United States	12 June 2012	Digital EP	Downtown; Universal Republic	
