= Happy to You =

2012 studio album by Miike Snow

Studio album by Miike Snow
- Released: 13 March 2012
- Recorded: May–November 2011
- Studios: Robotberget (Stockholm); Downtown Records (New York City)
- Genres: Indie pop; electropop
- Length: 40:08
- Labels: Downtown; Universal Republic
- Producer: Miike Snow

Miike Snow chronology
Miike Snow (2009)	Happy to You (2012)	iii (2016)

Singles from Happy to You
- 1. "Paddling Out" Released: 23 January 2012; 2. "The Wave" Released: 14 May 2012; 3. "Pretender" Released: 30 October 2012

Professional ratings
Aggregate scores
Source	Rating
Metacritic	73/100
Review scores
Source	Rating
AllMusic	3/5 stars
The A.V. Club	B−
Clash	8/10
Entertainment Weekly	A−
The Guardian	3/5 stars
NME	8/10
Now	4/5
Pitchfork	5.8/10
Rolling Stone	3/5 stars
Slant Magazine	3/5 stars

Happy to You is the second studio album by Swedish indie pop band Miike Snow. It was released in the United States on 13 March 2012 by Downtown Records and Universal Republic Records, and in the United Kingdom on 19 March 2012 by Columbia Records.

== Background and recording ==
Miike Snow announced on social media on 31 May 2011 that they were working on a new album. On 6 October 2011, the band began mixing the album. After recording for the album concluded on 29 November 2011, the band started filming the accompanying music videos and finished working on the artwork. The album was named after an "old mis-spelt phrase" on a Thailand postcard that the band put up in the studio. Band member Christian Karlsson said it has "nothing to do with any of the songs... but it sort of stuck".

== Release and promotion ==
The promotional single "Devil's Work" debuted on Zane Lowe's BBC Radio 1 on 6 December 2011, and was subsequently offered as a free download. The band announced on 20 December 2011 that their second studio album would be titled Happy to You, with a release date set for the week of 26 March 2012.

The album's lead single "Paddling Out" premiered on Spin magazine's website on 19 January 2012, before its digital release on 23 January. Another song from the album, "Black Tin Box" (a collaboration with Swedish singer Lykke Li), premiered on Pitchfork on 24 January 2012. Happy to You was released on iTunes on 13 March 2012, 13 days ahead of the original 26 March release date.

"The Wave" was released as the album's second single on 14 May 2012. The accompanying video premiered on 15 March and was once again directed by Swedish director Andreas Nilsson, who also worked on the video for "Paddling Out". Both videos form together a unified story about a group of unfortunate humans who were abducted to space in an experiment to create a perfect human named Jean Noel. After some pretty brutal chainsaw surgery that is performed on the latest abductee, the spaceship seemingly crewed by Rococo-era twins crashes to Earth and that is where the story of the second video starts.

== Commercial reception ==
In the United States, Happy to You debuted at number 43 on the Billboard 200, selling 10,000 copies its first week. It also debuted at number 13 on the Billboard's Rock Albums chart and at number nine on the Alternative Albums chart. As of January 2016, the album had sold 42,000 copies in the US.

== Track listing ==
All tracks are written by Miike Snow.

No.	Title	Length
1.	"Enter the Joker's Lair"	3:28
2.	"The Wave"	3:43
3.	"Devil's Work"	3:55
4.	"Vase"	3:40
5.	"God Help This Divorce"	4:32
6.	"Bavarian #1 (Say You Will)"	4:02
7.	"Pretender"	3:33
8.	"Archipelago"	4:05
9.	"Black Tin Box" (featuring Lykke Li)	5:33
10.	"Paddling Out"	3:37

The Jackalope Edition bonus disc
No.	Title	Length
1.	"Garden"	3:54
2.	"No Starry World"	4:14
3.	"Devil's Work" (Alex Metric Remix)	5:34
4.	"Paddling Out" (Wolfgang Gartner Remix)	6:07
5.	"Paddling Out" (Carli Remix)	6:02
6.	"The Wave" (Style of Eye Remix)	5:01
7.	"Paddling Out" (Jacques Lu Cont Remix)	5:45

The Jackalope Edition – international digital version bonus tracks
No.	Title	Length
11.	"Garden"	3:54
12.	"No Starry World"	4:14
13.	"Devil's Work" (Alex Metric Remix)	5:34
14.	"Paddling Out" (Wolfgang Gartner Remix)	6:07
15.	"Devil's Work" (Ruben Haze Remix)	4:15
16.	"The Wave" (Style of Eye Remix)	5:01
17.	"Paddling Out" (Jacques Lu Cont Remix)	5:45
18.	"Paddling Out" (music video)	3:58
19.	"The Wave" (music video)	4:01
20.	"Devil's Work" (film accompaniment)	3:55
21.	"Birth to Death" (video)	0:21
22.	"Pilgrim" (video)	0:29
23.	"Dog Inside Your Body" (video)	0:29

The Jackalope Edition – US digital version bonus tracks
No.	Title	Length
11.	"Garden"	3:50
12.	"No Starry World"	4:12
13.	"Paddling Out" (Wolfgang Gartner Remix)	6:07
14.	"Devil's Work" (Alex Metric Remix)	5:34
15.	"Paddling Out" (music video)	3:59
16.	"The Wave" (music video)	4:03

== Personnel ==
- Miike Snow – production, arrangements, recording, all instruments, programming, vocals
- Nille Perned – additional recordings
- Niklas Flyckt – mixing
- Ted Jensen – mastering
- Samuel Lundin – mastering assistance
- Lykke Li – additional vocals (track 9)
- Gustav Ejstes – autoharp (track 2)
- Nils Törnqvist – drums (tracks 1–4, 6–9)
- Thomas Hedlund – drums (track 10)
- David Lindberg – field drums (tracks 2, 6)
- Jonathan Lundberg – field drums (tracks 2, 6)
- Claes Malmberg – field drums (tracks 2, 6)
- Fredrik Syberg – strings (tracks 3, 5, 6, 9)
- Natalie Migdal – strings (tracks 3, 5, 6, 9)
- Pär Lindqvist – strings (tracks 3, 5, 6, 9)
- Sabina Sandri Olsson – strings (tracks 3, 5, 6, 9)
- Johan Ahlin – French horn (tracks 3, 5)
- Svante Halldin – flugelhorn, trumpet (track 3)
- Axel Sjöstedt – trumpet (track 6)
- Staffan Findin – trombone, bass trombone (track 3)

== Charts ==
Chart performance for Happy to You
Chart (2012)	Peak position
Australian Albums (ARIA)	16
Belgian Albums (Ultratop Flanders)	123
Belgian Alternative Albums (Ultratop Flanders)	34
Belgian Heatseekers Albums (Ultratop Wallonia)	17
Canadian Albums (Nielsen SoundScan)	62
Danish Albums (Hitlisten)	40
Dutch Albums (Album Top 100)	69
German Albums (Offizielle Top 100)	91
Scottish Albums (Official Charts)	32
Swedish Albums (Sverigetopplistan)	42
Swiss Albums (Schweizer Hitparade)	50
UK Albums (Official Charts)	31
US Billboard 200	43
US Top Alternative Albums (Billboard)	9
US Top Rock Albums (Billboard)	13
