= Remedy (Crookers song) =

Single by Crookers featuring Miike Snow

from the album Tons of Friends
- Released: 19 February 2010
- Length: 3:13
- Label: Liberator Music
- Songwriters: Andrea Fratangelo, Andrew Wyatt, Christian Karlsson, Francesco Barbaglia, Pontus Winnberg
- Producers: Crookers, Switch

Crookers singles chronology
"No Security" (2009)	"Remedy" (2010)	"Festa Festa" (2010)

Miike Snow singles chronology
"Silvia" (2010)	"Remedy" (2010)	"Paddling Out" (2012)

"Remedy" is a song performed by Italian DJ duo Crookers featuring Swedish band Miike Snow. It was released on 19 February 2010 as the third single from Crookers' album Tons of Friends (2010).

== Music video ==
The music video was directed by Paul Kamuf.

== Track listing ==
- Digital EP
1. "Remedy" – 3:13
2. "Remedy" (Cassius remix) – 9:19
3. "Remedy" (Cassius dub) – 8:23
4. "Remedy" (Cassius instrumental) – 9:20
5. "Remedy" (Magik Johnson vocal mix) – 5:59
6. "Remedy" (Magik Johnson Acid Thunder dub) – 5:35
7. "Remedy" (Riton Rerub) – 4:35
8. "Remedy" (AlexKid remix) – 6:18
9. "Remedy" (AlexKid dub) – 7:23
10. "Remedy" (Numan remix) – 5:12

== Charts ==
Chart (2009–10)	Peak position
Belgium (Ultratip Bubbling Under Flanders)	10
