= Tons of Friends =

Studio album by Crookers
- Released: March 8, 2010
- Recorded: 2009
- Genre: Electro house, hip house, dubstep
- Label: Southern Fried Records/3ème Bureau

Crookers chronology
Tons of Friends (2010)	Dr Gonzo (2011)

Singles from Tons Of Friends
- 1. "Put Your Hands On Me (feat. Kardinal Offishall & Carla-Marie)" Released: October 2009; 2. "No Security (feat. Kelis)" Released: November 2009; 3. "Remedy (feat. Miike Snow)" Released: February, 2010; 4. "Festa Festa (feat. Fabri Fibra & Dargen D'Amico)" Released: February 2010

Tons of Friends is the debut album by Italian electronic duo Crookers. It was released on March 8, 2010, on Southern Fried Records. Many of the songs feature collaborations, including Kid Cudi, Soulwax, Kelis, will.i.am, Róisín Murphy, Miike Snow and many more.

The song "Royal T" featuring Róisín Murphy was featured on Season 7 of So You Think You Can Dance.

== Track listing ==
No.	Title	Length
1.	"We Love Animals" (feat. Soulwax & Mixhell)	5:03
2.	"No Security" (feat. Kelis)	3:07
3.	"Natural Born Hustler" (feat. Pitbull)	3:08
4.	"Let's Get Beezy" (feat. will.i.am)	2:58
5.	"Park the Truck" (feat. Spank Rock)	1:58
6.	"Hold Up Your Hand" (feat. Róisín Murphy)	3:13
7.	"Hip Hop Changed" (feat. Rye Rye)	4:47
8.	"Cooler Couleur" (feat. Yelle)	4:47
9.	"Birthday Bash" (feat. The Very Best, Dargen D'Amico & Marina Gasolina)	4:07
10.	"Put Your Hands on Me" (feat. Kardinal Offishall & Carla-Marie)	3:40
11.	"Royal T" (feat. Róisín Murphy)	5:23
12.	"Remedy" (feat. Miike Snow)	3:11
13.	"Arena" (feat. Poirier & Face-T)	3:35
14.	"Tee-Pee Theme" (feat. Drop the Lime)	1:42
15.	"Transilvania" (feat. Steed Lord)	4:07
16.	"Have Mercy" (feat. Carrie Wilds)	3:25
17.	"Jump Up" (feat. Major Lazer, Leftside & Supahype)	3:47
18.	"Lone White Wolf" (feat. Tim Burgess)	3:27
19.	"Day 'n' Nite" (Acapella Skit)	1:58
20.	"Embrace the Martian" (feat. Kid Cudi)	3:38
21.	"Outro" (feat. Dargen D'Amico)

Italian Version:

1. "Festa Festa" (feat. Fabri Fibra and Dargen D'Amico)
2. "Luce" (feat. Samuel Romano)
