= Paddling Out =

Single by Miike Snow

from the album Happy to You
- Released: 23 January 2012
- Genre: Electropop; house
- Length: 3:41
- Label: Columbia; Downtown; Universal Republic
- Songwriters: Christian Karlsson; Pontus Winnberg; Andrew Wyatt
- Producer: Miike Snow

Miike Snow singles chronology
"Remedy" (2010)	"Paddling Out" (2012)	"The Wave" (2012)

"Paddling Out" is a song by Swedish indie pop band Miike Snow from their second studio album, Happy to You (2012). It was released as the album's lead single on 23 January 2012 through Columbia, Downtown and Universal Republic. Written and produced by the band, the song was recorded in a studio previously occupied by Swedish pop group ABBA, which influenced its sound. Band member Pontus Winnberg dubbed the track an homage to dance floor disco. Musically, "Paddling Out" is a piano-driven electropop and house song with disco, Italo house and acid jazz elements, backed by a four on the floor beat.

"Paddling Out" received positive reviews from music critics, some of whom praised its dance production and hailed it as one of the best tracks on Happy to You. Commercially, the release is among the band's most successful singles. It achieved its highest national peak position on the Dutch Top 40 at number 32. It also became the band's fourth consecutive entry on the UK Singles Chart, peaking at number 90. Elsewhere, it managed to enter the Scottish singles chart and the Flemish Ultratip chart.

The single's accompanying music video was directed by Andreas Nilsson, who created the concept after discussing genetic engineering and surveillance with the band. The visual tells the story of a man who is abducted and transformed into a "Perfect Human" by a group of childlike aliens dressed in Victorian fashion. The story continued in the video for Happy to You's follow-up single "The Wave" and concluded with the album's third single "Pretender". Miike Snow has performed live renditions of "Paddling Out" on several occasions, including Late Show with David Letterman and a session for BBC Radio 1.

== Background ==
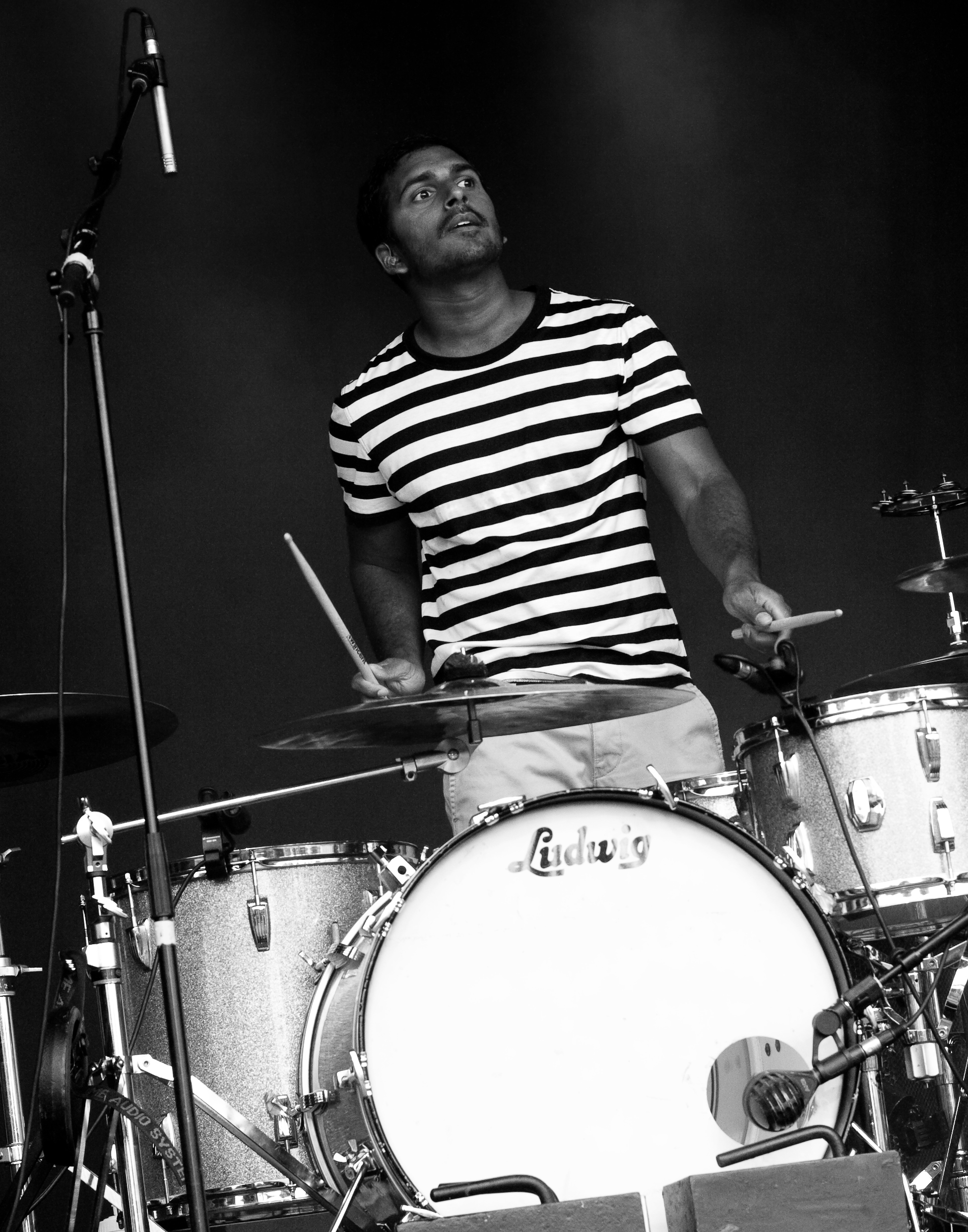
Thomas Hedlund played the drums on "Paddling Out."

"Paddling Out" was written by Miike Snow's three members, Christian Karlsson, Pontus Winnberg and Andrew Wyatt, for the band's second studio album, Happy to You (2012). The song was recorded along with the rest of the album during the second half of 2011. "Paddling Out" and several other album cuts were recorded in a studio previously used by Swedish pop group ABBA in the 1970s. Regarding the studio, Winnberg told HuffPost, "It was full of old recording equipment, and we recorded the drums and acoustic instruments in there. It added a kind of classic environment to the whole album. And it was vibey; we hung out there a lot." The band told Billboard that of all the tracks recorded there, "Paddling Out" has the most prominent ABBA-influenced sound, calling it "definitely a house song". Winnberg described it as an homage to "a kind of dancefloor disco-inferno he's not heard in too long". Wyatt first came up with the piano loop eleven years prior to finalizing the song.

While working on their debut album, Miike Snow (2009), the band focused on creating structured pop songs and completed most of the process themselves, apart from mixing. For the Happy to You sessions, they worked with several other musicians, feeling they had more creative freedom and could "plan the process more". The band went to the studio with the goal to complete an album, as opposed to their debut album which was "a bunch of songs that ended up on album". Wyatt said of Happy to You, "The way we thought about songwriting was quite different, and also the production process was different because we could use other methods." One of the collaborators invited to the sessions was Swedish drummer Thomas Hedlund, a touring member of Phoenix, who was enlisted to play the drums on "Paddling Out". The remainder of the instruments utilized in the song were played by the band, which also handled arrangement, programming, production and recording. Additional recording was managed by Nille Pernerd. It was then mixed by Niklas Flyckt and mastered by Ted Jensen.

== Composition and lyrics ==
"Paddling Out"
A 22-second sample of "Paddling Out", showcasing its chorus and beginning of the second verse. Some critics noted Wyatt's vocals as "sex-less", and others commented on the melancholic lyrics.

Musically, "Paddling Out" is an electropop and house song with a four on the floor beat. The track has disco and Italo house influences and "chopped up bits of acid jazz". Its instrumentation is primarily based on drums, a piano, and synthesizers. The production features a piano chord loop, an "amped-up" backbeat and occasional sirens. The beat "stutters and stops" throughout the track. Lily Moayeri of Under the Radar compared the piano riffs to early 1990s Italo house. Similarly, Lewis Corner of Digital Spy felt the piece "fus[es] Italo-house piano with pacey beats and chants". Music commentators characterized lead singer Wyatt's vocals as "sex-less" and "vaguely androgynous", while the chorus features "bubbly" backing vocals. Some critics noted "Paddling Out"'s melancholic lyrics, and Ailbhe Malone of NME observed that it includes a "big beat bounce" and "sing-along melancholy". The chorus begins with the lyric "There's someone here who laughs too hard at everything", followed by the lines "You say isn't it hard / Paddling out, paddling out". Sputnikmusic's staff writer Rudy K. commented that the contrast between the song's "infectious tone" and melancholic lyrics is similar to that of Miike Snow's debut single "Animal" (2009).

== Release and remixes ==
Miike Snow premiered "Devil's Work", the first offering from Happy to You, on 6 December 2011 on Zane Lowe's radio show on BBC Radio 1, and put it up for free download as a buzz single. In early January 2012, the band launched a newspaper-esque website called The Tiimes with a teaser video of "Paddling Out". The full track was subsequently made available for streaming on 19 January 2012 via SoundCloud. Although initially reported to become available for download on 11 March 2012, the song was released to digital retailers on 23 January 2012 through Columbia as the official lead single for Happy to You. Another digital release, with three remixes produced by Wolfgang Gartner, Jacques Lu Cont and Carli, was released on 11 March 2012. Universal Republic issued a 7-inch vinyl subtitled The Remixes on 26 March 2012, containing the original track and the Gartner remix. "Paddling Out" was sent to alternative radio in the United States on 27 March 2012.

Prior to their digital release, the Lu Cont and Gartner remixes premiered online on 10 and 27 February 2012, respectively. Josiah Hughes of Exclaim! viewed Lu Cont's remix as an "exciting fist-pumper", writing that it "quite possibly surpass[es]" the original. MTV's Sam Lansky described Gartner's uptempo take as "aggressive", and noted the addition of handclaps and "grimy" synthesizers, which the writer believed fit well with Wyatt's vocals. A writer for Pigeons & Planes wrote that Gartner "flips the tune with some heavy bass, some heart-wrenching build-ups, and hard-hitting thumps". The remixes by Gartner, Lu Cont and Carli also appear on the Jackalope Edition of Happy to You. A remix produced by Penguin Prison was made available for free download on RCRD LBL on 10 April 2012. In March 2013, Sarah Polonsky of Vibe named it one of the DJ's best remixes.

== Critical reception ==
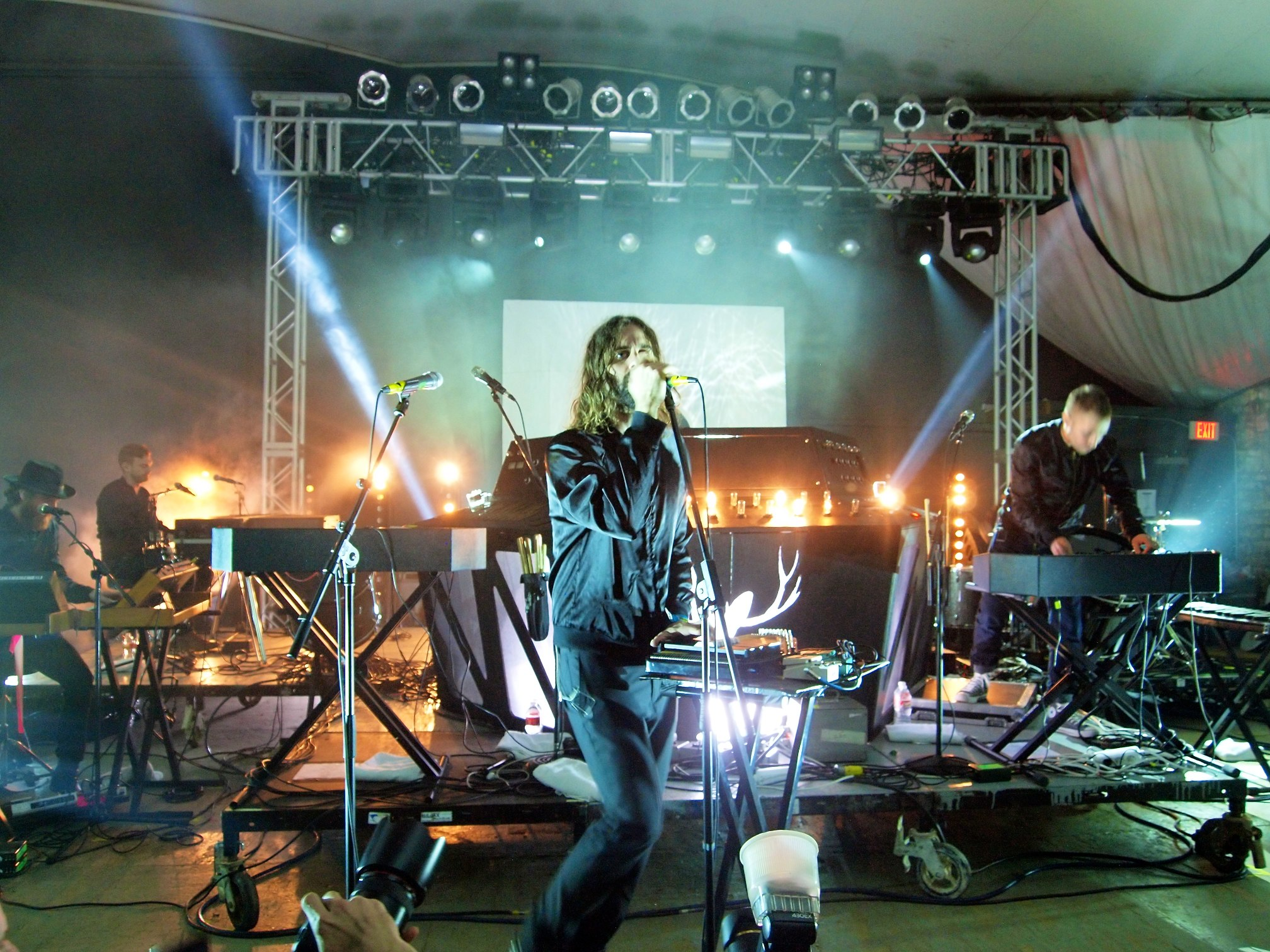
Several critics praised "Paddling Out" as one of the best songs on Miike Snow's album Happy to You.

"Paddling Out" was met with positive reviews from music critics. A writer for Pigeons & Planes opined that the song sees the band in their "most comfortable spot of creative, catchy pop music that's instantly likable and only more gratifying with each listen". PopMatters critic Evan Sawdey regarded it the best track on Happy to You, while also deeming it the best Miike Snow song yet. Naming it "absolutely jaw-dropping", Sawdey went on to appoint it as "one of the best dance tracks that's not being played right now". Caroline Sullivan of The Guardian applauded its catchiness, and Allison Stewart of The Washington Post described it as a "gem". Both AllMusic's Jason Lymangrover and Metro's Arwa Haider deemed it a highlight on the album. The New Zealand Herald's Chris Schulz said that "Paddling Out", along with two other Happy to You tracks, "will swirl around in your head for days and demand repeat plays".

Moayeri of Under the Radar noted the band's "blatant acknowledgement of rave-y influences" on the track, and perceived it as a stand-out on the album. Andy Baber, writing for musicOMH, felt the single showcased the band at "their electropop best", arguing its synthesizer instrumentation would make it "certain to be a dance-floor favourite". Similarly, Las Vegas Sun writer Annie Zaleski viewed the song as "kicky disco" and felt it was made for the dance floor, hailing it as one of the best tracks on Happy to You. Jonathan Donaldson of The Phoenix called the song an "upbeat dance number" and complimented the beat production, which he felt "most pop bands could get behind". George Bass of Drowned in Sound commented that while the single "doesn't break any barriers", it is a good workout track.

== Chart performance ==
"Paddling Out" made its first chart appearance on 11 February 2012, on the Dutch Single Top 100 chart at number 79, where it remained for a week. Also in the Netherlands, the song peaked at number 32 on the Dutch Top 40. In Belgium, the song debuted at number 71 on the Flemish Ultratip chart on 18 February 2012. It ascended steadily on the chart in the coming weeks, and achieved its peak position of number nine on 7 April 2012. The song spent a total of eight weeks on the chart. In the United Kingdom, "Paddling Out" entered the UK Singles Chart on the week ending 24 March 2012 at number 90. The following week, it descended to number 100, and fell off the chart thereafter. The single reached number 17 on the UK Dance Chart, where it was listed for two weeks. "Paddling Out" also entered the singles chart in Scotland, where it debuted and peaked at number 99.

== Music video ==
Andreas Nilsson directed the accompanying music video for "Paddling Out". Miike Snow met with Nilsson to discuss the concept for the video. In an interview for Creators, Nilsson revealed the concept was created after long discussions with the band about genetic engineering in contemporary science as they share a mutual interest in the medical scene. Wyatt told Digital Spy that Nilsson's images "go together in a way that feels truthful" to the band's work. He said, "I think that's one of the strengths of his work because ... you can read into it in different ways." When asked about the concept of the video, Wyatt told Gigwise that "It's a pretty obscure story and I don't think we should explain too much. So we will leave that for people to piece together the puzzle". Wyatt stated that the final product was mostly Nilsson's idea, noting that surveillance by companies such as Google and genetic engineering were key inspirations for the clip.

A teaser clip of the video entitled "Birth to Death" was released on the band's promotional website The Tiimes in January 2012. The full video then premiered on the website on 3 February 2012. The following month, Wyatt revealed to Digital Spy that the visual is the first in a series of music videos. The Nilsson-directed video for Happy to You's second single, "The Wave", premiered in March 2012 and continues the story established in the clip. The final installment in the trilogy, the visual for the album's third single "Pretender", arrived in September 2012. It was directed by Vern Moen, who Nilsson gave creative freedom to do "what he felt right in the moment".

The "Paddling Out" video begins as a man awakens on the floor of his house. After drinking milk in the kitchen, a pair of shoes atop a pedestal suddenly appears in the bedroom. The man puts on the shoes and begins to dance. As he looks out the window, it is revealed he is in outer space aboard a house-shaped spaceship. Two Victorian-dressed children twins (played by the actresses Francesca and Therese Kortesmaki) then appear, attacking him with laser guns. The man is then given plastic surgery by the childlike aliens. He is transformed into a "Perfect Human" called Jean Noel, which includes a big nose, strong chin, erect nipples, "massive cock", shirtless upper body and leather pants. Terrified of his new appearance, he starts to dance in the hallways of the spaceship, where he runs into a group of other specimens looking exactly like him. The spaceship then crashes to Earth as Jean Noel screams in horror.

== Live performances ==
Miike Snow performed a live rendition of "Paddling Out" and a cover version of Phil Collins' "Two Hearts" (1988) at Maida Vale Studios for BBC Radio 1 on 14 March 2012. The following month, the band appeared on Late Show with David Letterman on 27 April 2012 to perform "Paddling Out". Miike Snow also included the song on the set list for their 2012 tour in support of Happy to You. It was later performed on the iii World Tour throughout 2016, promoting their third studio album iii (2016). The set list mainly consisted of tracks from the band's debut album and iii, while "Paddling Out" was the only song included from Happy to You. During rehearsals, the band "rediscovered" its older work and felt it connected more naturally with the new material on iii; Winnberg commented that it was "a little more fun" to play songs from the debut album than Happy to You.

== Formats and track listing ==
- 7"
1. "Paddling Out" – 3:41
2. "Paddling Out" (Wolfgang Gartner remix) – 6:07
- Digital download
1. "Paddling Out" – 3:41
- Digital download (remix)
1. "Paddling Out" (Penguin Prison remix) – 5:52
- Digital EP
1. "Paddling Out" – 3:41
2. "Paddling Out" (Wolfgang Gartner remix) – 6:07
3. "Paddling Out" (Jacques Lu Cont remix) – 5:45
4. "Paddling Out" (Carli remix) – 6:02
- Promo CD
1. "Paddling Out" – 3:42
2. "Paddling Out" (instrumental) – 3:38

== Credits and personnel ==
Credits are adapted from the Happy to You liner notes.

- Christian Karlsson, Pontus Winnberg, Andrew Wyatt – songwriting
- Miike Snow – vocals, production, arrangement, programming, instruments, recording
- Nille Perned – additional recording
- Thomas Hedlund – drums
- Niklas Flyckt – mixing
- Ted Jensen – mastering

== Charts ==
Chart (2012)	Peak position
Belgium (Ultratip Bubbling Under Flanders)	9
Netherlands (Dutch Top 40)	32
Netherlands (Single Top 100)	79
Scottish Singles Sales (Official Charts)	99
UK Dance (Official Charts)	17
UK Singles (Official Charts)	90

== Release history ==
Country	Date	Format	Label	Ref.
European countries	23 January 2012	Digital download	Columbia	
United States	3 February 2012	Digital download	Downtown; Universal Republic	
Various countries	11 March 2012	Digital EP	Columbia	
Various countries	26 March 2012	7"	Universal Republic	
United States	27 March 2012	Alternative radio	Downtown; Universal Republic	
Various countries	10 April 2012	Digital download (remix)	RCRD LBL	
