= I Like You So Much Better When You're Naked =

Single by Ida Maria

from the album Fortress Round My Heart
- Released: 21 July 2008
- Length: 3:15
- Label: RCA; Waterfall
- Songwriter: Ida Maria Sivertsen
- Producers: Kai Robøle; Kenneth Lewis

Ida Maria singles chronology
"Queen of the World" (2008)	"I Like You So Much Better When You're Naked" (2008)	"Oh My God" (2008)

"I Like You So Much Better When You're Naked" (sometimes shortened to "I Like You So Much Better" or "Naked"), is a song by Norwegian rock musician Ida Maria. Ten months after the UK release of the single, it was released in the US on 26 May 2009. The song borrows from The Banana Splits Adventure Hour's opening theme, "The Tra La La Song", and pays homage to them in its music video.

== Reception ==
On 27 July 2008, the song entered the UK Singles Chart at number 18 on downloads alone and peaked at number 13. On 14 August 2008 the song entered the Irish Singles Chart at number 34. With the release of Fortress Round My Heart in the United States, the song first appeared on the Modern Rock Tracks chart in April 2009. In Australia, the song was ranked number 39 on Triple J's Hottest 100 of 2008.

== Track listings ==
CD single

1. "I Like You So Much Better When You're Naked" (album version)
2. "Leave Me Let Me Go"

7-inch vinyl

A. "I Like You So Much Better When You're Naked"
B. "Lightning"

== Charts ==
Chart (2008–2009)	Peak position
Australia (ARIA)	55
Europe (Eurochart Hot 100)	40
Ireland (IRMA)	34
Norway (VG-lista)	19
Scottish Singles Sales (Official Charts)	20
UK Singles (Official Charts)	13
US Alternative Airplay (Billboard)	30

=== Year-end charts ===
Chart (2008)	Position
UK Singles (OCC)	155
