= Fortress Round My Heart =

Studio album by Ida Maria
- Released: 28 July 2008 (Norway and UK)
- Recorded: Townhouse Studios
- Genre: Indie rock
- Length: 31:10
- Label: Nesna Records, Sony BMG, Waterfall Records, Mercury Records, Island Def Jam Records

Ida Maria chronology
Fortress Round My Heart (2008)	Katla (2010)

Alternative cover
- 2009 UK reissue

Professional ratings
Review scores
Source	Rating
Allmusic	3.5/5 stars
The A.V. Club	(A−)
The Fly	3.5/5 stars
The Guardian	2/5 stars
Los Angeles Times	3/4 stars
NME	(6/10)
Pitchfork Media	(7.5/10)
Rolling Stone	3.5/5 stars
Slant	3.5/5 stars
Spin	4.5/5 stars

Fortress Round My Heart is the debut album by Norwegian musician Ida Maria, released in the UK on 28 July 2008, and in the US on 24 March 2009. Six singles were released before the album's release: "Oh My God", "Drive Away My Heart", "Stella", "Queen of the World", "I Like You So Much Better When You're Naked" and the re-release of "Oh My God".

== Track listing ==
The original version was released through Sony BMG, as they had signed a partnership deal with Norway's Waterfall Records, who signed Ida and her independent label, Nesna Records. All songs composed by Ida Maria Sivertsen.

All songs written by Ida Maria

1. "Oh My God" – 3:18
2. "Drive Away My Heart" – 3:21
3. "Louie" – 2:27
4. "I Like You So Much Better When You're Naked" – 3:14
5. "Keep Me Warm" – 3:30
6. "Forgive Me" – 3:14
7. "Stella" – 3:03
8. "Morning Light" – 2:25
9. "Queen of the World" – 3:29
10. "See Me Through" – 3:24

== Deluxe edition ==
On 9 February 2009 a deluxe edition of the album was released, after the re-release of "Oh My God". It features three new tracks, the removal of one song ("See Me Through"), a change in the order of the songs, new artwork and two bonus videos exclusive to iTunes. The album was released independently, through Nesna Records and Waterfall Records, as the deal with SonyBMG had been terminated.

Track listing

1. "Oh My God"
2. "Morning Light"
3. "Queen of the World"
4. "Stella"
5. "Forgive Me"
6. "Leave Me, Let Me Go" (New)
7. "I Like You So Much Better When You're Naked"
8. "Louie"
9. "Drive Away My Heart"
10. "Keep Me Warm"
11. "In the End" (New)
12. "We're All Going to Hell" (New)
13. "I Like You So Much Better When You're Naked" Video (iTunes bonus track)
14. "Oh My God" Video (iTunes bonus track)

== US Edition ==
Mercury Records, an imprint of Island/Def Jam, released "Fortress 'Round My Heart" on digital download services on 24 March 2009. The album features 9 of the 10 tracks of the original release but with a completely rearranged track listing and new artwork again. It replaces the last song with 'In the End' from the deluxe edition. All songs composed by Ida Maria Sivertsen.

1. Oh My God
2. Morning Light
3. I Like You So Much Better When You're Naked
4. Stella
5. Keep Me Warm
6. Forgive Me
7. Queen Of The World
8. Louie
9. Drive Away My Heart
10. In The End

== Chart performance ==
The album debuted on the U.K. chart at #39, (which became its peak position). The following week, it fell out of the top 40, from #39 to #60.

In Norway, it debuted at #5 (which became its peak position). It remained in the top 20 for seven weeks.

In Ireland, it debuted at #38.

The NME rated it as the 48th best album of the year for 2008.

== Singles ==
Song	Release date	UK Peak position
"Oh My God"	1 October 2007	DNC
"Drive Away My Heart"	10 December 2007	DNC
"Stella"	10 March 2008	185
"Queen Of The World"	12 May 2008	DNC
"I Like You So Much; Better When You're Naked"	21 July 2008	13
"Oh My God" (re-release)	26 January 2009	85

== Charts ==
=== Standard edition ===
Chart	Peak position
UK Album Chart	39
Irish Album Chart	38
Norway Album Chart	5

== Personnel ==
- Ida Maria – vocals, rhythm guitar
- Stefan Törnby – lead guitar
- Johannes Lindberg – bass guitar
- Olle Lundin – drums
