= Dr Gonzo (album) =

Studio album by Crookers
- Released: 24 October 2011
- Recorded: 2011; 15 years ago
- Genre: Electro house, alternative dance
- Length: 52:35
- Label: Southern Fried (Europe), Mad Decent (US)
- Producer: Crookers

Crookers chronology
Tons of Friends (2010)	Dr Gonzo (2011)

Singles from Dr Gonzo
- 1. "Bust 'Em Up" Released: 10 April 2011; 2. "The Gonzo Anthem" Released: 1 July 2011; 3. "Hummus" Released: 20 November 2011

Dr Gonzo is the second studio album by Crookers, which was released on 24 October 2011 through Southern Fried Records. It features many collaborations, pre-eminently with Carli, Savage Skulls and Marcus Price.

== Track listing ==
Track listing
No.	Title	Length
1.	"Dushi"	4:30
2.	"Wake App"	4:47
3.	"Dr Gonzo's Anthem" (featuring Carli)	4:06
4.	"Hummus" (featuring Hudson Mohawke & Carli)	4:41
5.	"Bust 'Em Up" (featuring Savage Skulls)	3:49
6.	"Gonzo C.A.M.P." (featuring Marcus Price & Carli)	3:39
7.	"Carcola" (featuring Lazy Ants & His Majesty Andre)	4:24
8.	"Woh A Do" (featuring Keith & Supabeatz)	3:49
9.	"That Laughing Track" (featuring Style Of Eye & Carli)	3:55
10.	"Get The Fuck Out Of My House" (featuring Savage Skulls)	3:55
11.	"Springer" (featuring Neoteric & Wax Motif)	4:26
12.	"Texx" (featuring Surkin & Bobmo)	3:47
13.	"Just The End"	2:56
Total length:		52:35

== Notes ==
The instrumental version of "Hummus" was the one featured on the Cream Club Anthems 2012 CD and did not feature the vocals from Hudson Mohawke and Carli. In "Hummus" the word "Dr. Gonzo" is mentioned towards the end of the song and is shortly followed by the word "Again".
