= Katla (album) =

Studio album by Ida Maria
- Released: November 8, 2010 (Norway); June 7, 2011 (United States)
- Recorded: Summer 2010
- Genre: Punk, rock, blues rock
- Length: 34:36
- Label: Universal, Island Def Jam Records
- Producer: Butch Walker

Ida Maria chronology
Fortress Round My Heart (2008)	Katla (2010)	Love Conquers All (2013)

Alternative cover
- United States cover

Katla is the second album by Norwegian singer-songwriter Ida Maria. It was released in Norway in September 2010 and internationally in June 2011.

== Album information ==
The album was recorded in Santa Monica, Los Angeles, sometime during the Summer of 2010, while the Eyjafjallajökull volcano erupted, which led Ida Maria to title it Katla. The original edition of the album featured, on its cover, a photo of the volcano taken in 1918. Produced by Butch Walker (Avril Lavigne, P!NK), it was considered by Maria as a good opportunity to experiment.

The two advance tracks before the international release were "Bad Karma" and "Cherry Red". In Norway, the first single was "Quite Nice People", which was promoted by a video directed by Stone Elvestad. Additionally, "Bad Karma" was featured in the 2011 film Scream 4.

The track "10,000 Lovers" is partially sung in Ida Maria's native Norwegian and, therefore, marks the first time the singer does so in an official release.

== Artwork ==
The original cover of the album is the photo of the 1918 eruption of the Katla Volcano. The included album booklet includes also artwork for every song in the album, the included artwork for "Bad Karma" was as well used for the single release. There's an extra photo which although unmarked, can stand as the artwork for "Gallery". The back cover of the album does not include "Gallery" in the track list.

For the US release, all artwork was printed on red tones instead of their original colors. It featured the "Bad Karma" artwork as the album's cover, the volcano photo was used as the song's artwork instead. New artwork for "Cherry Red" and "Devil" was included and there is no artwork for "Gallery" in this edition, although the song is in the back cover's track list.

== Track listing ==
No.	Title	Writer(s)	Producer(s)	Length
1.	"Quite Nice People"	Ida Sivertsen	Butch Walker, Sivertsen	3:22
2.	"Bad Karma"	Sivertsen, Stefan Törnby, Desmond Child	Walker	2:55
3.	"10,000 Lovers"	Sivertsen, Walker, Törnby	Walker	3:04
4.	"Cherry Red"	Sivertsen, Walker, Törnby	Walker	2:50
5.	"Let's Leave"	Sivertsen, Walker, Törnby	Walker	2:54
6.	"I Eat Boys Like You for Breakfast"	Sivertsen, Törnby	Walker	3:32
7.	"Devil"	Sivertsen, Törnby	Walker, Sivertsen	9:47
8.	"My Shoes"	Sivertsen	Walker, Sivertsen	3:57
9.	"Gallery (Bonus Track)"	Sivertsen	Walker, Sivertsen	2:15
Total length:				34:36
