= The Epic Split =

2013 commercial by Volvo Trucks

Coordinates: 38.853°N 3.95°W

- Jean-Claude Van Damme during his split between two Volvo FM trucks
- Agency: Forsman & Bodenfors
- Client: Volvo Trucks
- Language: English
- Running time: 75 seconds
- Release date: 13 November 2013
- Directed by: Andreas Nilsson
- Music by: Only Time by Enya
- Starring: Jean-Claude Van Damme
- Budget: $3–5 million (estimated)

"The Epic Split feat. Van Damme (Live Test)" is a 75-second-long commercial released in November 2013 by Swedish company Volvo Trucks, as the sixth commercial in their "Live Tests" advertising campaign. The commercial was made to demonstrate the stability of the Volvo FM trucks while using their implementation of dynamic steering response.

It features Belgian actor Jean-Claude Van Damme (then 52 or 53) performing a split on the wing mirrors between two backwards moving trucks set to the music "Only Time" by Irish singer Enya. The commercial was recorded in a single take at the inactive Ciudad Real International Airport in Spain during a sunrise. It was produced by the agency Forsman & Bodenfors and was directed by Andreas Nilsson. It has won several awards, and multiple parodies were based on the commercial.

== Content ==
External videos
- Volvo Trucks – The Epic Split feat. Van Damme (Live Test) on YouTube (1 minute, 16 seconds)

The commercial starts with Van Damme's face in close up. In the voice-over, he says:

"I've had my ups and downs. My fair share of bumpy roads and heavy winds. That's what made me what I am today. Now I stand here before you. What you see is a body crafted to perfection. A pair of legs engineered to defy the laws of physics and a mindset to master the most epic of splits."

The camera zooms out and shows that he is standing on the mirrors of two trucks which are both driving backwards. The left truck starts to move sideways, while Van Damme starts his gymnastic split. The camera is moving sideways, causing the sun to disappear and appear again behind the trucks. The music "Only Time" by Enya plays during the commercial, which includes the lyric "Who can say where the road goes ..." The commercial then states: "This test was set up to demonstrate the stability and precision of Volvo Dynamic steering. It was carried out by professionals in a closed-off area".

== Background ==
The Epic Split was the sixth advert released in a series of commercials, called Live Tests, by the Swedish advertising agency Forsman & Bodenfors for Volvo Trucks. The agency was appointed in 2010 in preparation for Volvo's 2012 European truck range, its first in 20 years. The five adverts created before The Epic Split were: "Ballerina", "The Technician", "The Hook", "Hamster" and "The Chase".

== Production ==
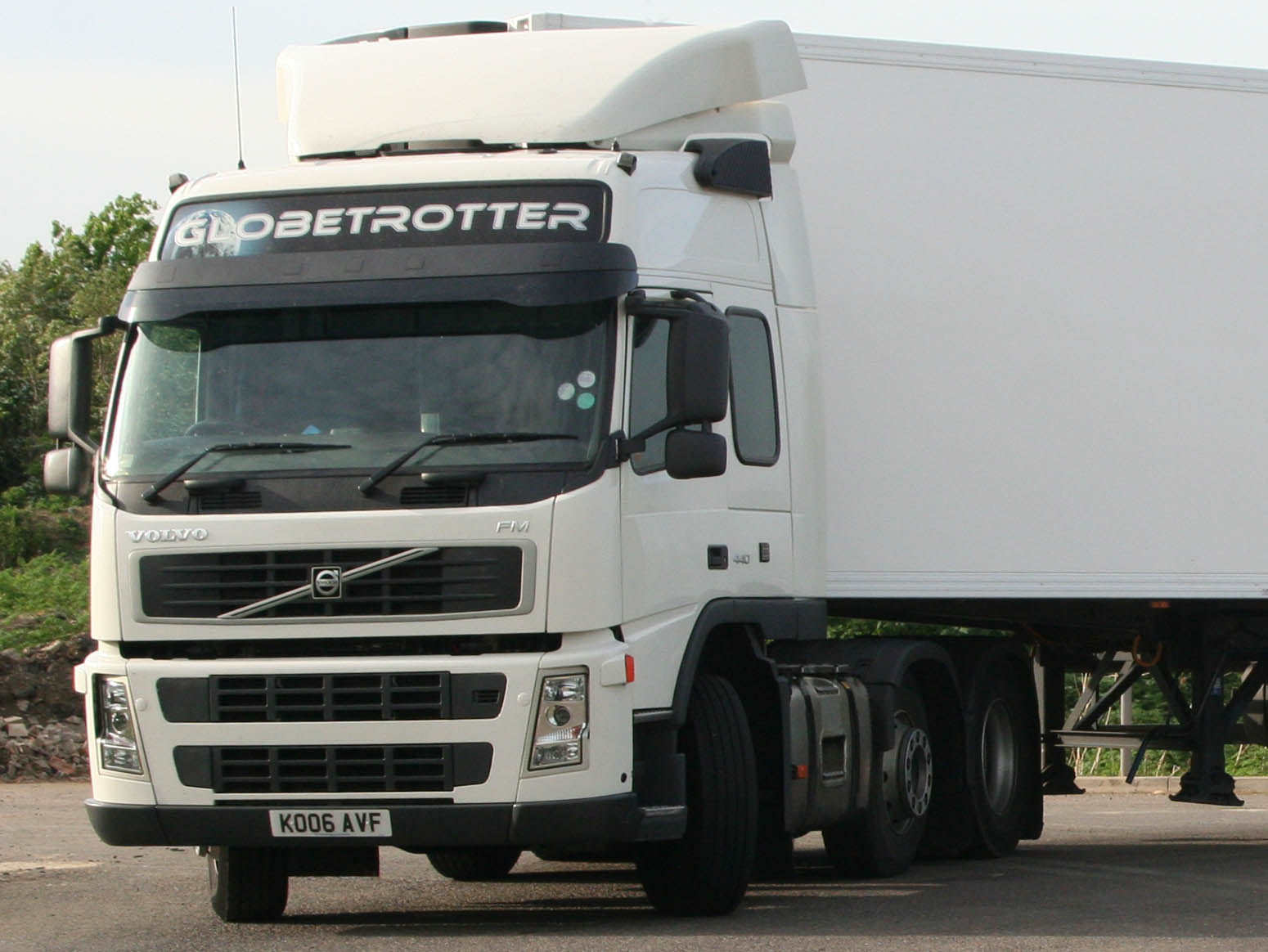
Volvo FM series, the same series that was used in the commercial

The director was Andreas Nilsson. The runway of the closed Ciudad Real International Airport in Spain was selected as the shooting location during the five-month planning period.

Following three days of rehearsals, the stunt footage featuring van Damme was recorded in a single take. Van Damme was protected by a hidden safety harness and wire not visible in the final result. A small platform was fitted to each truck behind the wing mirrors to support Van Damme's feet during the stunt. Mikael Rosell was the driver of the truck steering sideways. Both trucks were driving in reverse at a fixed speed of 25 kilometres per hour (16 mph), with co-drivers in each of the two trucks to help monitor the speed.

Filming was performed with an Arri Alexa digital camera mounted via a boom to a camera car. The long shot was captured in a single take, because of the position of the sunrise. Colour grading was performed by the Mill and removal of reflections and safety wires was done by Swiss International.

== Reception ==
One week after release, Epic Split had been viewed online 25 million times, and after nine days reached 40 million views. Enya's music "Only Time" re-entered the Billboard Top 100 reaching number 43, thirteen years after the original release.

In May 2014, Epic Split won the Best in Show award from The One Club. During 2014 Epic Split won a Black Pencil award from the Design and Art Direction design awards in 2014. In December 2014, the advert received six prizes including the Film Grand Prix at the Eurobest awards in Helsinki, Finland. In 2015, it won another prize at the Cannes Lions International Festival of Creativity, for Creative Effectiveness.

== Analysis ==
An initial international follow-up market research survey by GfK found Epic Split to be the most attention grabbing of the six adverts in the Live Tests series, but less effective than the other five in causing immediate action of the viewer.

Neuroscientific analysis showed that female viewers were more intrigued and engaged during the split itself; whereas male viewers sympathised with the pain possibly being felt by Van Damme, subsequently leading to high memory encoding effectiveness at the precise point of the "Volvo Dynamic Steering" message being shown. By late-2014 the overall campaign was estimated to have cost $3–4 million to produce, and generated $170 million in revenue for Volvo.

== Parodies ==
Less than a week after Volvo released the advert, a face-swapped variant was distributed, with Van Damme replaced by then-Mayor of Toronto Rob Ford. In November 2013, during the filming of 22 Jump Street, a parody was created with actor Channing Tatum performing the splits between two food trolleys.

In December 2013, a parody was created showing Chuck Norris as Walker, Texas Ranger, performing a similar manoeuvre between two aircraft to the opening lines of Hamlet. As the camera pulls back eleven commandos are seen balancing on the character's head in the shape of an illuminated Christmas tree. Five years later, the director of Epic Split, Nilsson, would go on to film a commercial for Toyota Tacoma pickups featuring the real Chuck Norris.

On April Fools' Day 2014, Bohemia Interactive released a parody of The Epic Split as part of a promotion for the fake "Arma 3: Karts" downloadable content pack for their 2013 video game Arma 3. The video depicts a major character from the game's story performing a similar stunt between two go-karts. Though intended as a mere joke, the video became so popular with fans that Bohemia released the Karts DLC on May 29, 2014, as Arma 3's first paid DLC.
