= Royal Swedish Army Drum Corps =

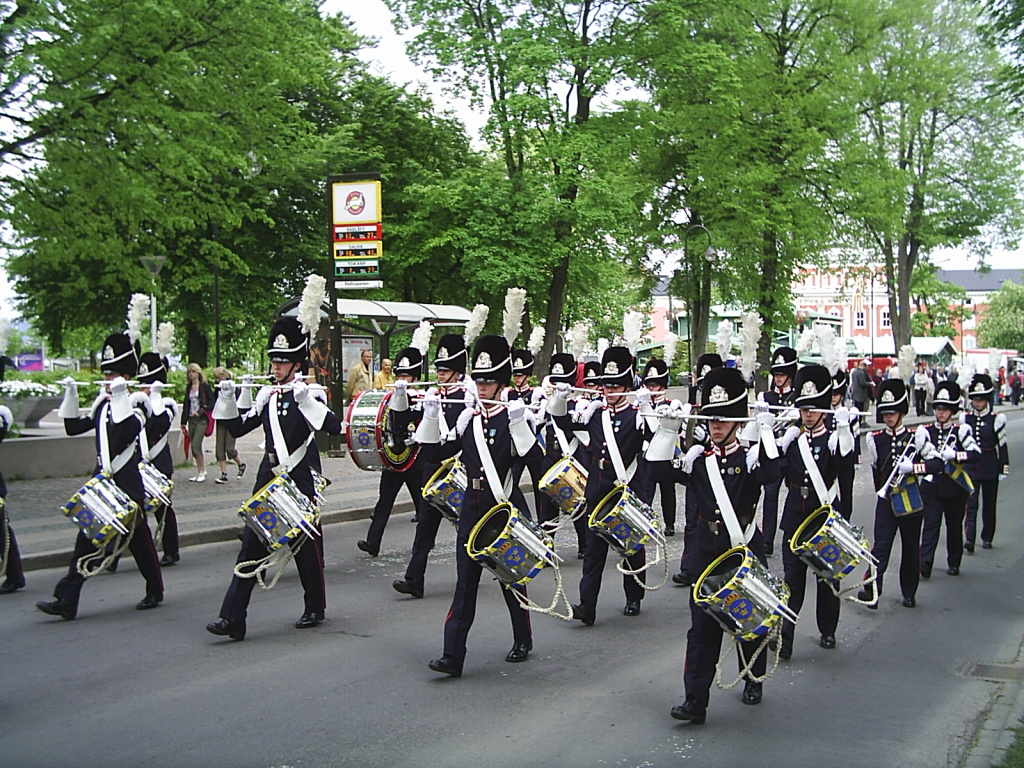
Royal Swedish Army Drum Corps

Royal Swedish Army Drum Corps (Swedish: Arméns trumkår) was a marching band of the Swedish Armed Forces Music Corps, comprising 25 musicians who served from 1992 to 2009.
