= Crookers =

Italian electronica duo

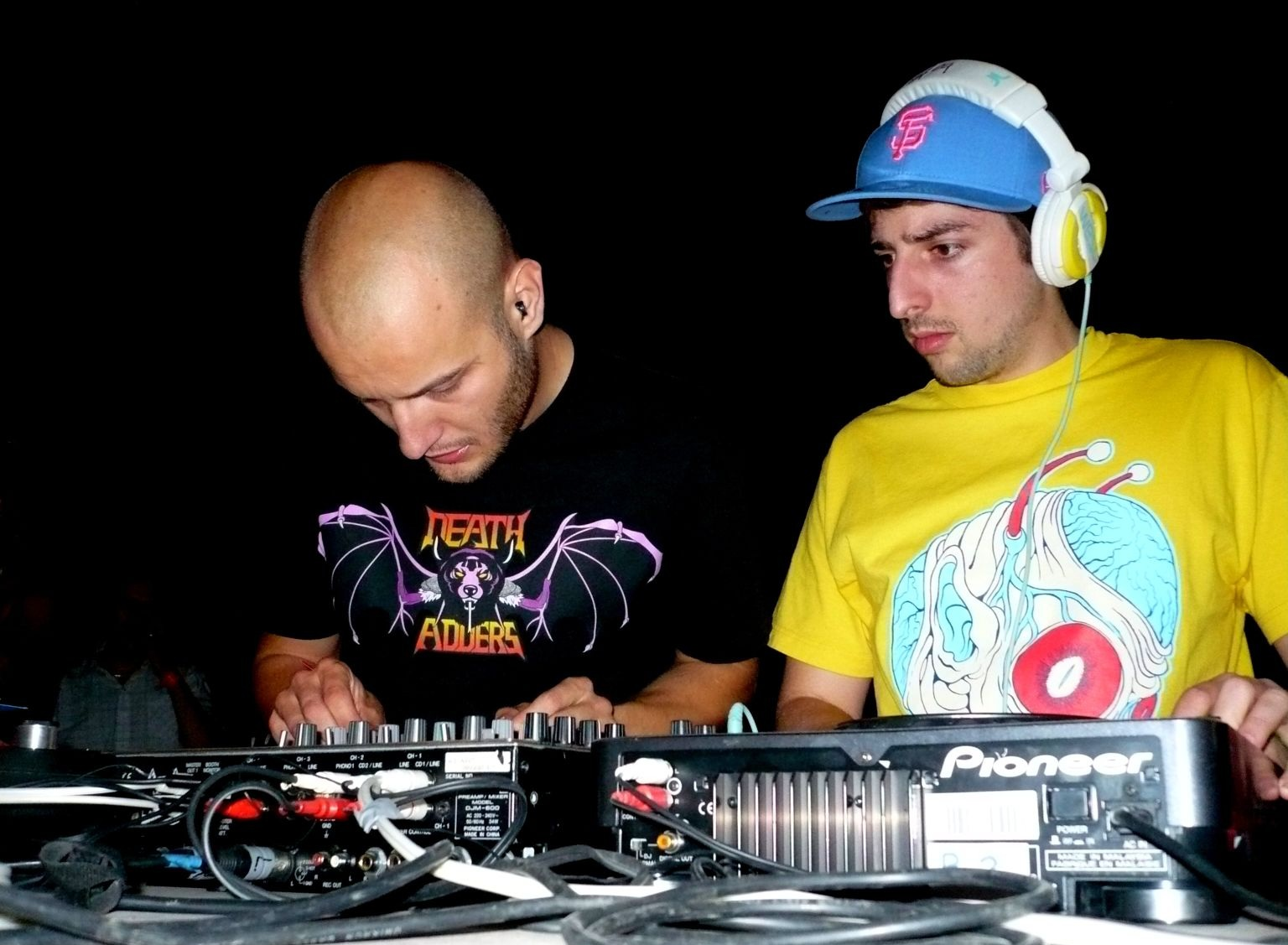
- Crookers in 2008

Background information
- Origin: Milan, Italy
- Genres: Electro house, dance-punk
- Years active: 2003–present
- Labels: Southern Fried; Interscope; Fool's Gold; Ciao; Ministry Of Sound; Owsla; Dim Mak
- Members: Francesco "Phra" Barbaglia
- Past members: Andrea "Bot" Fratangelo
- Website: crookers.it

Crookers is the musical project of Italian DJ and producer Francesco "Phra" Barbaglia.

Crookers was originally a duo consisting of Phra and fellow producer Bot, who worked together from 2003 to 2012. When the two artists met, both were trying to branch out of their genre and explore dance music. Their first collaboration worked. Phra said, "It felt natural to team up, seeing that we had the same musical tastes... which isn't that easy here in Milan."

On October 19, 2012, it was announced that Bot had left the group to pursue a new direction and that Phra would carry on the Crookers name as a solo project.

Since then, Phra has produced the song "Ghetto Guetta" under the Crookers alias; the song was published on Phra's own label Ciao Recs under licence to the Be Yourself Catalog as well as Owsla. Phra has released singles from his forthcoming 'Sixteen Chapel' album. 'Heavy' followed 'Ghetto Guetta' as the second single off the album. There were remixes from Hybrid Theory, Donovans and Sharkslayer & First Gift. Following that, Crookers then released Able To Maximize via Ciao Recs with remixes from Chuckie, franskild, Mao Ra Sun, Digi and Suck Fake. Phra then released 'Get Excited ft STS' for free via his social media. During this time, Phra asked the group Plastic Horse to put their spin on the music videos.

Crookers' track "Picture This" was released via Ciao Recs on 9 September and his new album Sixteen Chapel was scheduled to be released in February 2015..

== Biography ==
Phra began DJing at age 11, when he was introduced to the Italian hip hop scene.

Crookers' first international release was on Berlin's Man Recordings (Funk Mundial #3), for which they contributed various remixes. The duo later released three EPs in 2008 (Knobbers, Mad Kidz and E.P.istola, all containing exclusive original tracks). In 2009, Crookers released the song, "Business Man", featuring British rapper Wiley and Thomas Jules. That was featured in the racing video game Need for Speed: Nitro, which was also released that year. Their debut album, Tons of Friends, was released in 2010.

Their collaboration with Kid Cudi in "Day 'N' Nite" entered the UK Singles Chart at number 2 and is featured on the game Midnight Club: Los Angeles.

Crookers work with producer/remixer Sketch Iz Dead on many of their tracks.

In 2009, Crookers produced the track "Business Man" with Wiley and Thomas Jules. Later that year, Crookers DJed on ElectroChoc, an in-game radio station of Grand Theft Auto: The Ballad of Gay Tony, which is based around the nightclub scene of Liberty City. Also, the group gained significant attention with the closing song in the final GTAIV game, ("The Ballad of Gay Tony") called "No Security". In the same year they remixed 'Get On Your Boots' by U2 and confirmed to be one of the most acclaimed DJ duos of that period.

In November 2010, the duo signed a deal with Interscope Records, and they released their new single "We Love Animals" under the label as their first single of their upcoming second studio album.

On 27 June 2011, Crookers released The Gonzo Anthem EP. Then on 24 October, they released their second album, Dr Gonzo, featuring Neoteric, Savage Skulls, Wax Motif, His Majesty Andre, Lazy Ants and Keith & Supabeatz. The album has been described as a return to their original style.

Bot left the group in October 2012. Phra continues to use the Crookers name as a solo project.

Phra released a new track called "Ghetto Guetta" on the 22 October 2013 on Ciao Recs, and released it on 29 October 2013 on Big & Dirty Recordings under license to the Be Yourself Catalogue.

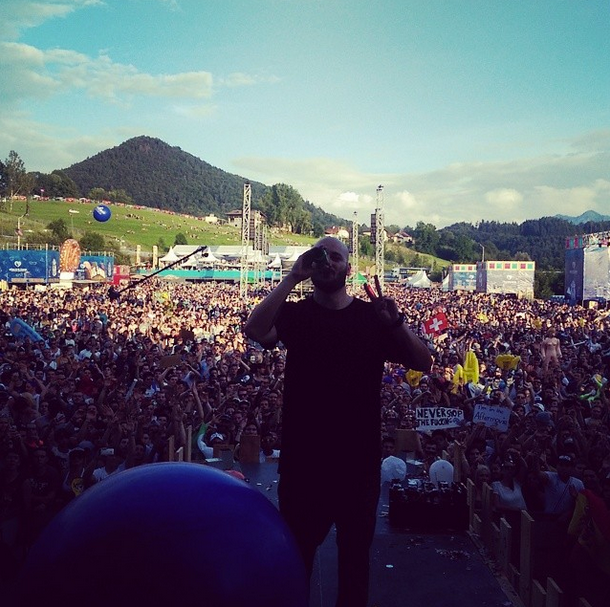
Phra in Austria, July 2014

== Discography ==
=== Albums ===
Year	Title	Label
2009	Crookers Showcase	Avex Trax
2009	Put Your Hands on Me	Avex Trax
2010	Tons of Friends	Southern Fried Records
2010	Tons of Remixes	Southern Fried Records
2011	Dr Gonzo	Mad Decent
2012	From Then Until Now	Southern Fried Records
2015	Sixteen Chapel	Dim Mak / Ciao Recs

=== Singles and EPs ===
Year	Artists	Title	Release date	Label
2006	Crookers	End 2 End	Oct, 2006	P-House
2007	Crookers	Aguas de Parco	Mar 1, 2007	Big Sur Recordings
2007	Crookers	Made in Italy	May 1, 2007	On The Brink
2007	Crookers	Funk Mundial #3	May 18, 2007	
2007	Crookers feat. La Pisa & Mr. Cocky	Limonare	Jun 1, 2007	P-House
2007	Crookers vs. Il Deboscio	Limonare vs. Frangetta	Jul 5, 2007	Xnote S.r.l
2007	Crookers	Massive	Sep 14, 2007	Potty Mouth Music
2007	Crookers / The Bloody Beetroots	Timberland Boots	Nov, 2007	White Label
2008	Crookers	Knobbers	Jan 27, 2008	Southern Fried Records
2008	Crookers	Love to Edit	Feb, 2008	White Label
2008	Crookers	Mad Kidz	Jul 20, 2008	Southern Fried Records
2008	Crookers	E.P.istola	Jul 29, 2008	Mad Decent
2008	Kid Cudi vs. Crookers	Day 'n' Nite	Dec 24, 2008	Data Records
2009	Crookers feat. Wiley & Thomas Jules	Business Man	Aug 23, 2009	Southern Fried Records
2009	Crookers feat. Kardinal Offishall & Carla-Marie	Put Your Hands On Me	Oct 4, 2009	Southern Fried Records
2009	Crookers	What Up Y'all	Oct 6, 2009	Fool's Gold Records
2009	Crookers feat. Kelis	No Security	Nov 29, 2009	Southern Fried Records
2009	Crookers feat. Soulwax & Mixhell	We Love Animals	Dec 10, 2009	Southern Fried Records
2010	Crookers feat. Fabri Fibra & Dargen D'Amico	Festa	Feb 12, 2010	Southern Fried Records
2010	Crookers feat. Miike Snow	Remedy	Feb 28, 2010	Southern Fried Records
2010	Crookers feat. Róisín Murphy	Royal T	May 23, 2010	Southern Fried Records
2010	Crookers feat. Yelle	Cooler Couleur	Aug, 2010	La Musique Fait La Force
2011	Crookers & Savage Skulls	Bust 'Em Up	Apr 10, 2011	Southern Fried Records
2011	Crookers & Savage Skulls	Bust 'Em Up Remixes	Aug 7, 2011	Southern Fried Records
2011	Crookers	The Gonzo Anthem	Jun 26, 2011	Southern Fried Records
2011	Crookers	The Gonzo Anthem Remixes	Aug 29, 2011	Southern Fried Records
2011	Crookers feat. Hudson Mohawke & Carli	Hummus	Nov 20, 2011	Southern Fried Records
2012	Guè Pequeno vs. Crookers	R.E.B.	Mar 20, 2012	Universal Music Italia
2012	Crookers with Style of Eye & Carli	That Laughing Track	Apr 29, 2012	Southern Fried Records
2012	Crookers	Massive (Remixed)	May 22, 2012	Potty Mouth Music
2012	Fabri Fibra vs. Crookers	L'Italiano Balla	Jun 29, 2012	Universal Music Italia
2012	Crookers with Neoteric & Wah Motif	Springer	Jul 9, 2012	Southern Fried Records
2012	Crookers	Bowser	Sep 4, 2012	Fool's Gold Records
2012	Crookers	From Then Until Now	Oct 29, 2012	Southern Fried Records
2012	Crookers	Big Booty Bootleg	Nov 12, 2012	Ciao Recs
2012	Crookers & RVBRA	Pop That Bootleg	Dec 4, 2012	Ciao Recs
2013	Crookers	Giga / A Go Go	Feb 19, 2013	Ciao Recs
2013	Crookers	Remixed Part 1 – Bangers	Mar 4, 2013	Southern Fried Records
2013	Crookers	Ghetto Guetta	Oct 22, 2013	Owsla / Ciao Recs
2014	Crookers	Heavy	Mar 25, 2014	Ciao Recs
2014	Crookers	Able To Maximize	May 6, 2014	Ciao Recs
2014	Crookers	Picture This	Sept 9, 2014	Ciao Recs
2015	Crookers feat. Jeremih	I Just Can't	March, 2015	Ciao Recs
2015	Crookers & DJ Funk	Skype Music	Sept 25, 2015	Ciao Recs

=== Music videos ===
Year	Song	Director(s)
2009	"Put Your Hands on Me"	Jonnie Malachi
2009	"No Security"	Mattias Erik Johansson, Henrik Qvarnström
2010	"Remedy"	Paul Kamuf
2010	"Festa Festa"	Danxzen
2011	"Bust 'Em Up"	
2011	"Hummus"	Plastic Horse
2012	"That Laughing Track"	Jerome Potter, Johnny Woods
2013	"Ghetto Guetta"	Phra
2014	"Able To Maximize"	Plastic Horse
2014	"Picture This"	Plastic Horse

=== Remixes ===
Year	Artist	Track	Title
2005	Stylophonic	"Baby Beat Box"	
2005	Stylophonic	"We Got Some People In Da House"	Stylophonic Meets the Crookers Mix
2006	AC/DC	"Thunderstruck"	
2006	Jovanotti	"Questo è Un Mondo Selvaggio"	
2007	Adam Sky vs. Mark Stewart	"We Are Prostitutes"	
2007	Armand Van Helden	"I Want Your Soul"	Crookers Remix; Crookers Crunk Remix
2007	Bonde do Rolê	"Marina Gasolina"	Crookers Crunk Remix
2007	Brodinski	"Bad Runner"	Crookers Gone Electro Remix
2007	Carnifull Trio	"Song for Guido"	Crookers Crunk Remix
2007	Diabolico Coupè	"Lavorare"	Crookers Crunk Remix
2007	Dusty Kid	"The Cat"	Crookers Remix; Crookers Eurocrunk Remix
2007	Edu K	"Gatas Gatas Gatas"	Crookers Crunk
2007	Jamelia	"Something About You"	Crookers Crunky Remix
2007	N*E*R*D	"Everyone Nose"	Phra Re-Fix
2007	Rodion	"Electric Soca"	
2007	The Bumblebeez	"Dr Love"	Crooker$ Remix
2007	The Chemical Brothers	"Salmon Dance"	Crookers 'Wow' Mix
2007	Timbaland	"The Way I Are"	Crookers – The Way We Are
2007	Tocadisco feat. Chelonis R. Jones	"Shrine"	
2008	Azzido da Bass	"Dooms Night"	
2008	Busy P feat. Murs	"To Protect and Entertain"	Crookers Remix; Crookers Dub Remix
2008	Boosta feat. Skin	"Last"	Crookers Crunk Remix
2008	Cazals	"Life Is Boring"	Crookers No Fear to Fly Remix
2008	Chromeo	"Fancy Footwork"	
2008	Clark Able	"Lemon Head"	
2008	Danny	"Set Your Body Free"	
2008	David Guetta feat. Thailand	"Joan of Arc"	Crookers Pimp My Ark Remix; Crookers 'Hardtime' Remix
2008	Diplo feat. Rye Rye	"Wassup Wassup"	Crookers Remix; Crookers Happy Remix
2008	Don Rimini	"Let Me Back Up"	Crookers Tetsujin Mix
2008	Edu K feat. Marina	"Me Bota Pra Dancar"	
2008	Isa GT	"Pela'O"	
2008	Kelis	"Bossy"	
2008	Kid Cudi	"Day 'n' Nite"	
2008	Ludacris	"Move Bitch"	
2008	Magik Johnson	"The Bushman"	
2008	Moby	"I Love to Move in Here"	Crookers Crack Mix; Crookers Lemmesee Mix; Crookers Bass In Here Mix
2008	Nelly Furtado	"Maneater"	
2008	Radioclit	"Secousse"	Crookers Spino Mix
2008	Shinichi Osawa	"Rendezvous"	
2008	Snoop Dogg	"Sensual Seduction"	
2008	Timbaland feat. OneRepublic	"Apologize"	
2008	The Bumblebeez	"Rio"	Crookers Bang Remix
2008	The Outhere Brothers	"Enjoy"	Crookers Vocal Mix; Crookers Dub Mix
2008	The Proxy	"Raven"	
2008	The Secret Handshake	"Summer of '98"	
2008	The Whip	"Trash"	
2008	Wiley	"Summertime"	
2009	Crookers feat. Kelis	"No Security"	Crookers Ode to the Whales Remix
2009	Britney Spears	"If U Seek Amy"	
2009	Fever Ray	"Seven"	
2009	Jesse Rose	"Touch My Horn"	
2009	Mixhell feat. Oh Snap & Jen Lasher	"Boom Da"	
2009	Miike Snow	"Animal"	
2009	Steed Lord	"Dirty Mutha"	
2009	Tiga	"Beep Beep Beep"	
2009	U2	"Get On Your Boots"	
2010	Bad Rabbits	"Stick Up Kids"	
2010	Dennis Ferrer	"Hey Hey"	
2010	Faithless	"Tweak Your Nipple"	
2010	Green Velvet	"La La Land"	
2010	Lady Gaga & Beyoncé	"Telephone"	Crookers Vocal Remix; Crookers Dub Remix
2010	N*E*R*D feat. Nelly Furtado	"Hot-n-Fun"	
2010	Robbie Williams	"Difficult for Weirdos"	
2010	Savage Skulls & Douster feat. Robyn	"Bad Gal"	
2010	Two Door Cinema Club	"Something Good Can Work"	Crookers Dirrrrrty Mix
2011	Major Lazer feat. The Partysquad	"Original Don"	
2011	Munchi feat. Mr. Lexx	"Shottas"	
2012	Theophilus London	"Stop It"	
2012	Isa GT	"Alegria"	
2012	WAFA	"Abandon Me"	
2012	Taku Inoue	"F.F.Y.R. (Livemonitor)"	
2012	Chuckie & Junxterjack	"Make Some Noise"	
2013	deadmau5 & Imogen Heap	"Telemiscommunications"	
2013	TJR	"Ode to Oi"	
2014	Young Thug	"Stoner"	
2015	Yogi feat Pusha T	"Burial"	
2018	Mavi Phoenix	"LOS SANTOS"	Crookers Infinity Mix
