= Oh My God (Ida Maria song) =

Single by Ida Maria

from the album Fortress Round My Heart
- Released: 1 October 2007 (UK) Original Release; 26 January 2009 (UK) Re-Release
- Recorded: 2007
- Songwriter: Ida Maria

Ida Maria singles chronology
"Oh My God" (2007)	"Drive Away My Heart" (2007)
I Like You So Much Better When You're Naked (2008)	Oh My God (2009)	Bad Karma (2010)

"Oh My God" is the debut song by Norwegian rock musician Ida Maria. The song was originally released in October 2007 but was to be re-released in the UK following the success of her previous single, "I Like You So Much Better When You're Naked". The re-release date was pushed back several times; however, it was eventually rescheduled on 26 January 2009 along with a music video.

== Chart performance ==
"Oh My God" did not chart upon its original release.

Year	UK singles
2007	DNC
2009	85

"Oh My God" was featured in the final scene and credits of season two, episode two of the Netflix comedy Big Mouth. Additionally, the song has been used in promos for the CW show Gossip Girl, and was featured in episode #386 of the radio version of This American Life entitled "Fine Print". It followed a story on health insurance. The song was also featured in several movie trailers, including It's Kind of a Funny Story and The Virginity Hit.

"Oh My God" is one of the songs featured in the video game Rock Band 3.

== Critical reception ==
The NME rated it the 50th best song of 2008.

Time critic Josh Tyrangiel named this the #3 song of 2008, whereas Sasha Frere-Jones rated this the #2 song of the year.

After the song was re-released, Newsday named it as the best song of 2009.

== Iggy Pop Remix ==
In September 2009, a remix of the song along with a music video was released with Iggy Pop providing backing vocals and appearing in the video.
