= Ida Maria =

Norwegian singer

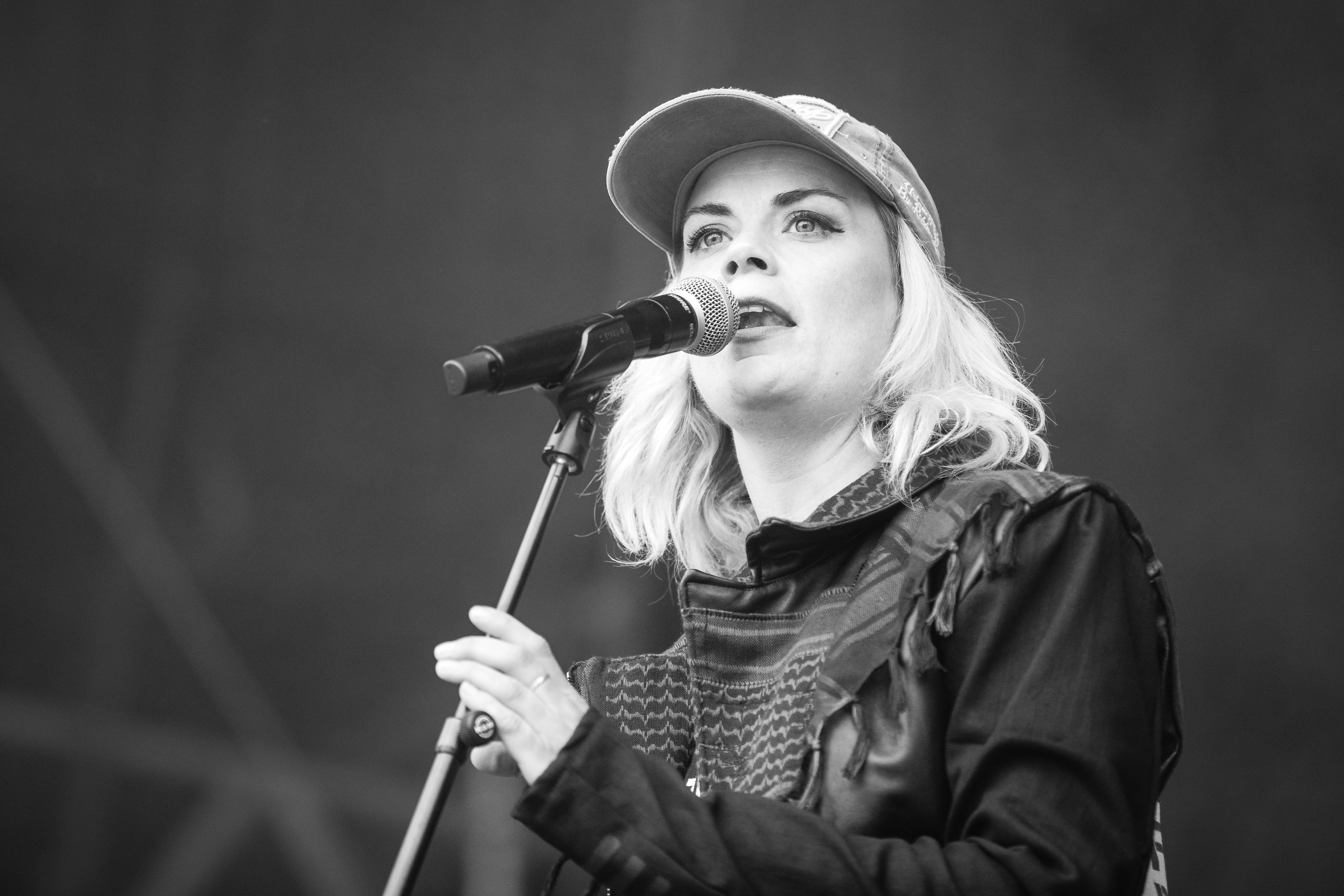
- Ida Maria performing in Kirketorget, Kongsberg 2024; Photo: Tore Sætre

Background information
- Born: Ida Maria Børli Sivertsen; 13 July 1984 (age 41); Nesna Municipality, Norway
- Genres: Punk rock, indie rock, alternative rock
- Instruments: Guitar, bass guitar, vocals
- Years active: 2007–present
- Labels: Nesna Records, Waterfall Records, Mercury Records, Lava Records, Indie Recordings
- Website: www.idamariamusic.com

Ida Maria Børli Sivertsen (/ˈiːdə/ EE-də; born 13 July 1984), better known simply as Ida Maria, is a Norwegian musician and songwriter.

== Biography ==
=== Early life ===
Maria was born and raised in Nesna Municipality. She taught herself to play guitar and began performing at local concerts at age 14.

=== Career ===
Maria gained considerable success in Norway in 2007 after winning two national competitions for unknown artists - Zoom urørt 2006 and Urørtkonkurransen 2007 - and playing successful shows at the annual Norwegian music industry festival By:Larm 2007 and 2008. In 2007, Maria released her first singles "Oh My God", "Drive Away My Heart", "Stella" and "Queen of the World".

Her debut album, Fortress Round My Heart, was released on 28 July 2008 and reached #5 in the Norwegians record chart, #38 on the Irish Albums Chart and #39 on the UK Albums Chart. The single, "I Like You So Much Better When You're Naked", entered the UK Singles Chart at #18 on downloads alone in July 2008 and peaked at #13. It also reached #18 in the Norwegian singles chart. In August 2008 the song entered the Irish Singles Chart at #34. The song was also featured on Triple J's Hottest 100 of 2008 in Australia. A deluxe version of her debut album containing unreleased tracks was released in February 2009. Fortress Round My Heart was finally released in the United States in March 2009 with "I Like You So Much Better When You're Naked" appearing on the Hot Modern Rock Tracks chart in April 2009. In July 2009, "Oh My God", Maria's debut single in 2007, was re-released as a single along with a music video. In September 2009, a remix version and music video for "Oh My God" featuring punk rock icon Iggy Pop singing backing vocals was released.

Having performed at various festivals, including the Glastonbury Festival and Reading festival, and being nominated for Best Rock/Indie Artist category at the BT Digital Music Awards 2008, Ida Maria has toured in Scandinavia, the UK, the United States and Australia. She performed her song "I Like You So Much Better When You're Naked" on The Tonight Show with Jay Leno in 2009.

Her second album, Katla, was released in Norway on 8 November 2010 (where it reached #14 on the album chart) and eventually in the United States in July 2011. and internationally on 7 June 2011.

Her third studio album, Love Conquers All, was released in August 2013 and was followed in February 2014 by her first EP release, Accidental Happiness.

Scandalize My Name, her fourth album, was released on 18 April 2016 and consists of a collection of American spirituals.

She competed in the Melodi Grand Prix 2018, attempting to represent Norway in the Eurovision Song Contest 2018 with the song 'Scandilove'. Her song was not one of the four songs that progressed to the Gold Final, and was eliminated.

Maria released the 5 song EP, Dirty Money, in June 2021.

Maria released her fifth album, Seven Deadly Sins + 3 on 26 September 2025. It is her first studio album in nine years.

==== Soundtracks ====
Maria's song "Queen Of The World" was used as the outro for season 3 episode 1 of The Inbetweeners.

Maria's song "I Like You So Much Better When You're Naked" was used in episode 8 of My Life As Liz entitled "A Prom to Remember Part 2". It was played during the dancing sequence at the prom. The song was also included in the soundtrack of the film Lesbian Vampire Killers. Her song "Louie" is being used for some commercials for the FX TV show Louie. It was again used as the inspiration for the title of episode 12, season 6 of Grey's Anatomy

The song "Oh My God" was one of the first songs announced to be used in Rock Band 3.

Maria's song "Keep Me Warm" was used in the season 4 finale of the ABC drama Grey's Anatomy and during some Nivea commercials during fall 2009. It has also been used in the UK drama show Skins, in series 4, episode 1.

Maria's song "Oh My God" was in the trailer for It's Kind of a Funny Story and The Virginity Hit.

Maria was one of the co-headliners of the 2009 Perez Hilton Presents tour. On 17 September 2009, after a Boston show, she pulled out of the tour, citing exhaustion.

Her song "Bad Karma" from Katla was used in the 2011 film Scream 4 and episodes of Gossip Girl, Teen Wolf, Royal Pains and Being Human together with the song "Quite Nice People", both from the album Katla.

Ida Maria's song "Oh My God" was used in a Finnish film, Sisko tahtoisin jäädä (Sister, I wanted to stay), released in 2010.

Ida Maria's song "Oh My God" was also used in American Netflix show, Big Mouth Season 2 Episode 2, released in 2018.

The song "Cold Blooded" has been featured on the soundtracks for the Melissa McCarthy comedy Spy and the musical drama Jem and the Holograms.

The song "I eat boys like you for breakfast" was used in the first episode of Season 10 of Jenter (Girls), a Norwegian TV and web series directed at children and teenagers on NRK Super.

The song “Devil” is featured on the trailer for Vampyr.

The song "Dirty Money" is featured in the second episode of season two of the show Peacemaker starring John Cena.

==== Collaborations ====
In 2007, Maria sang vocals for the track "I Love You, You Imbecile" by Pelle Carlberg.

In 2008, she sang backing vocals for the track "Words" on Guillemots' album Red.

In 2009, she collaborated with the Norwegian band DeLillos for the track "Flink" on their album Huskeglemme.

Maria has collaborated with the Norwegian rapper Joddski on two occasions, first on the track "Sannhetsserum" on his 2010 album Krig & Kjærlighet, and secondly on the track "Hold Ut" on is 2011 album Bensin På Bålet.

In 2012, she did a duet with Anthony Green for the track "Can't Be Satisfied" on his 2012 album Beautiful Things.

== Personal life ==
Maria is reported to experience synesthesia, which leads her to see colours when she hears music. She said:

I don't know what life's like without it, as I've always had it. As I've gotten older, I've seen that it has definitely been a bonus in terms of what I do. When I started to play guitar, I made this colour sheet for all the chords. I didn't know what they were called, but I knew exactly what colours and shades they were. So I made songs with colour palettes, which was really cool.

== Honors ==
- 2007: Alarmprisen in the category this years Artist of the Year, for the album Fortress Round My Heart
- 2008: Spellemannprisen in the category this years Newcomer, for the album Fortress Round My Heart
- 2008: By:Larm prisen
- 2008: Nesna Kommune Kulturpris
- 2009: Nordland Fylkeskommunes Kulturpris Nordland County Council Culture Award

== Discography ==
=== Studio albums ===
Title	Details	Peak chart positions	
Title	Details	NOR	UK
Fortress Round My Heart	Released: 28 July 2008; Label: Nightliner; Format: Digital download, CD	5	39
Katla	Released: 8 November 2010; Label: Waterfall Records, Universal Music; Format: Digital download, CD	14	—
Love Conquers All	Released: August 2013; Label: Nightliner; Format: Digital download, CD	—	—
Scandalize My Name	Released: 8 April 2016; Label: Kirkelig Kulturverksted; Format: Digital download, CD	—	—
Seven Deadly Sins + 3	Released: 26 September 2025; Label: Indie Recordings; Format: Digital download, CD	—	—
"—" denotes an album that did not chart or was not released.

=== Extended plays ===
Title	Details
Accidental Happiness	Released: 18 February 2014; Label: Republic Records; Format: Digital download, CD
Dirty Money	Released: June 2021; Label: Format: Digital download, CD

=== Singles ===
Title	Year	Peak chart positions			Album
Title	Year	NOR	AUS	UK	Album
"Oh My God" (Note: "Oh My God" was re-released in the UK on 26 January 2009.)	2007	—	—	—	Fortress Round My Heart
"Drive Away My Heart"	2007	—	—	—	Fortress Round My Heart
"Stella"	2007	—	—	185	Fortress Round My Heart
"Queen of the World"	2007	—	—	—	Fortress Round My Heart
"I Like You So Much Better When You're Naked"	2008	19	55	13	Fortress Round My Heart
"Oh My God (re-release)"	2009	—	—	85	Fortress Round My Heart
"Bad Karma" (Note: Norwegian release 11 September 2010. International release 3 May 2011.)	2010	—	—	—	Katla
"Cherry Red"	2011	—	—	—	Katla
"69"	2013	—	—	—	Accidental Happiness
"Boogie With the Devil's Soul"	2014	—	—	—	Accidental Happiness
"Scandalize My Name"	2016	—	—	—	Scandalize My Name
"I'm Gonna Tell God All Of My Troubles"	2016	—	—	—	Scandalize My Name
"You"	2017	—	—	—	Non-album singles
"Fy faen"	2017	—	—	—	Non-album singles
"Scandilove"	2018	—	—	—	Non-album singles
"The Comfort Song" (with Vamp)	2019	—	—	—	Non-album singles
"Underneath A Stranger's Eye"	2020	—	—	—	Non-album singles
"Sick of You"	2020	—	—	—	Dirty Money
"I'm Busy"	2021	—	—	—	Dirty Money
"Dirty Money"	2021	—	—	—	Dirty Money
"California"	2021	—	—	—	Dirty Money
"More"	2025	—	—	—	Seven Deadly Sins + 3
"Lazy"	2025	—	—	—	Seven Deadly Sins + 3
"Pride"	2025	—	—	—	Seven Deadly Sins + 3
"—" denotes a single that did not chart or was not released.

== Music videos ==
List of music videos, showing year released and director
Title	Year	Director(s)
"Drive Away My Heart"	2007	—N/a
"Stella"	2008	—N/a
"Queen of the World"	2008	—N/a
"Keep Me Warm" (live)	2008	—N/a
"I Like You So Much Better When You're Naked"	2008	—N/a
"Oh My God"	2009	—N/a
"Oh My God" (Remix ft. Iggy Pop)	2009	—N/a
"Louie" (live)	2009	—N/a
"Bad Karma"	2010	—N/a
"Quite Nice People"	2011	—N/a
"69"	2013	—N/a
"Last Vice"	2014	—N/a
"Boogie With the Devil's Soul"	2014	—N/a
"I'm Gonna Tell God All Of My Troubles"	2016	—N/a
"Sick of You"	2021	Santiago D.A.
"Dirty Money"	2021	Per Heimly

== Band ==
For her first album, Fortress Round My Heart, Maria's backing band included:

- Ida Maria Børli Sivertsen – vocals, rhythm guitar
- Stefan Törnby – lead guitar
- Johannes Lindberg – bass guitar
- Olle Lundin – drums

== Notes ==
Awards
Preceded by Tine Thing Helseth	Recipient of the Newcomer Spellemannprisen; 2008	Succeeded by Donkeyboy
