= Boys Will Be Boys (Dua Lipa song) =

2020 song by Dua Lipa

Song by Dua Lipa

from the album Future Nostalgia
- Released: 27 March 2020
- Studio: TaP (London); Masterlink (Surrey); RAK (London); Modulator (Toronto)
- Genre: Baroque pop; chamber pop
- Length: 2:46
- Label: Warner
- Songwriters: Dua Lipa; Kennedi; Justin Tranter; Jason Evigan
- Producer: Koz

Lyric video
- "Boys Will Be Boys" on YouTube

"Boys Will Be Boys" is a song by English singer Dua Lipa from her second studio album Future Nostalgia (2020), serving as the album's closing track. Lipa wrote the song with Kennedi, Justin Tranter and Jason Evigan, while the production was handled by Koz. It is a baroque pop and chamber pop ballad set to orchestral strings and marching band drums with backing vocals from the Stagecoach Epsom Performing Arts Choir. Intending to start a conversation with the song, "Boys Will Be Boys" has themes of feminism and addresses the growing pains girls experience, needing to grow up faster than boys. She condemns toxic masculinity and how society treats women as inferior.

Several critics commended the message and lyrics of "Boys Will Be Boys" however many found it to be too unlike other tracks on Future Nostalgia and thought that Lipa did not get her point across correctly. The song appeared on year-end lists published by The New York Times and Nylon while commercially peaking at number 78 in Lithuania and 148 in Portugal. A remix of the song by Zach Witness that samples "Think (About It)" by Lyn Collins appears on Lipa and the Blessed Madonna's remix album Club Future Nostalgia (2020). The latter musician played the remix at Lipa's Studio 2054 livestream concert while Lipa performed the song at the 2020 Billboard Women in Music ceremony.

== Background and development ==
Dua Lipa has often used her platform to advocate for issues she believes in, including feminism; of that she usually mentioned female equality in the workplace. The singer condemned the use of the term "boys will be boys" (Note: The term "boys will be boys" was created to justify the toxic behaviour exhibited by boys.) in a 2018 interview with GQ. "Boys Will Be Boys" was written by Lipa, Kennedi, Justin Tranter and Jason Evigan, while the production was handled by Koz. The song came about during a studio session between Lipa and the team she created "Physical" with, when they began talking about Lipa's experiences with men growing up as a female. The singer felt compelled to write the song as it stems from personal experiences and growing pains she faced and after talking about them with her friends and seeing posts on social media, she realized they were universal. These experiences revolved around her feeling powerless or intimidated in public spaces and doing things to avoid sexual harassment, catcalling and confrontation from men. Some of the experiences included putting keys through her knuckles, (Note: Putting one's keys between their knuckles is a self defense mechanism. Lipa explained that she would do it at night, especially in the winter time, when getting off the bus from school to make a three minute walk to her flat. Knowing there would be boys on bikes around the estates, she would put her keys between her knuckles in case they would catcall or chase her. She compared doing that to looking like Wolverine.) covering up her body, (Note: Lipa explained that girls would never want to attract unwanted attention when going out so they would cover up their bodies and not wear heels until they would meet up with their friends and have that safety element.) pretending as if she is on the phone with someone while walking alone, walking home before nightfall, self-policing friends by making sure she knew their location at all times and vice versa, and several other coping mechanisms. Lipa stated that she never thought twice about these experiences and thought they were just something she had to do.

With "Boys Will Be Boys", Lipa desired to start a conversation about issues women and girls face and how they change themselves to fit the lifestyle of men. She stated that much of women's human experience revolves around men and how they make them feel. The singer described that girls are made to feel uncomfortable at a young age with being taught that the way boys treat them is normal and playing a school game such as "Kiss Chase". She continued by explaining that it is difficult to change once one has a fixed mindset, so if young listeners could ask questions about these issues or if they are talked about in school, it would make a great impact on society. Additionally, Lipa confirmed that she did not want to offend anyone or point any fingers but she wanted the lyrics to be "cutting" for the sake of the conversation. She also wanted to show solidarity with other girls to express comfort that it happens to all girls. "Boys Will Be Boys" was recorded at Masterlink Studios in Surrey, RAK Studios in London and Modulator Music in Toronto while the vocals were recorded at TaP Studio in London. The mixing was handled by Jay Reynolds at Long Island Studios (Note: The location of Long Island Studios is not indicated in the liner notes of Future Nostalgia: The Moonlight Edition.) and the mastering was done by Chris Gehringer at Sterling Sound in Edgewater, New Jersey.

== Composition ==
"Boys Will Be Boys"
A baroque pop and chamber pop track, "Boys Will Be Boys" features orchestral strings alongside marching band drums. The song features feminism and empowerment themes and sees Lipa denouncing toxic behaviour exhibited by men. She flips the sexist titular trope in the chorus and mourns how girls need to grow up too fast due to some of the actions of boys.

"Boys Will Be Boys" was noted for being a departure from the sound of other tracks on Future Nostalgia. It is a baroque pop and chamber pop ballad turned anthem, that is composed in the key of E♭ major with a tempo of 125 beats per minute and a length of 2:46. The production features layered choral arrangements, orchestral strings, a disco beat, marching band drums and a melodramatic show-tune melody. Lipa uses defiant vocals and makes use of belting and chanting. The song includes backing vocals from a kids' choir, the Stagecoach Epsom Performing Arts Choir.

The "symphonic" Club Future Nostalgia remix of "Boys Will Be Boys" by Zach Witness has a club and Baltimore sound with a Rio Carnival feel. It features a Latin-inflected groove that helps amp up the track alongside a production consisting of frantic drums, whistles, horns, cowbells, and a distorted chanted chorus. The original version of the remix does not include the verses; however, the Blessed Madonna added them in on the album's DJ Mix edition as well as a sample of "Think (About It)" (1972) by Lyn Collins as a break. (Note: The official sample in the remix of "Boys Will Be Boys" is credited as containing elements of "Think (About It)" by James Brown and sampling "Think (About It)", performed by Lyn Collins.) Rupert Christie is credited as a lead producer alongside Koz for the remix, and it was mastered by Matt Colton at Metropolis Studios in London.

== Lyrics and themes ==
The lyrics of "Boys Will Be Boys" were noted for having no sense of subtlety and the singer sings in rhyming couplets. Themes of feminism and empowerment are portrayed in the song, while the lyrics see Lipa mourn how girls need to grow up faster than males, while also praising strong women. She denounces gender inequality, sexist double standards, the damage that patriarchy causes, male violence, misogyny, sexual harassment, toxic masculinity, gender stereotypes, men not taking responsibility for their actions, male privilege, the unbalanced expectations society places on girls in comparison to men and how women brush sexist remarks towards them.

In the first verse, Lipa outlines scenarios where women have to change something about themselves, including the fact that it is second nature for girls to walk home before nightfall, using the self-defense mechanism of putting their keys between their knuckles when around boys and women laughing off their fear of men. In the bridge, she takes aim at how these gender stereotypes are portrayed in the media. She also mentions how women are treated are talked over and treated as intellectual lessers as well as how hard it is for them to hide their frustration with men. The repetitive chorus features the line "boys will be boys but girls will be women", a flip of the sexist titular trope that shows how society allows boys to stay boys but forces girls to be women. The second verse sees Lipa condemning mansplaining, while in the middle eight, Lipa breaks the sonic fourth wall and states that males who are offended by the song are the ones who commit the acts of toxic masculinity.

== Release and promotion ==
"Boys Will Be Boys" was released through Warner Records on 27 March 2020 as the eleventh and final track on Lipa's second studio album Future Nostalgia. The singer decided to place it as the closing track as the song is a big contrast to the album's energetic, sassy and powerful title track, the opener. She thought it was necessary to show an unguarded side to herself to showcase that many women can be both empowered and vulnerable at the same time. She explained that each song shows a different side to feminism. Lipa further stated that "Boys Will Be Boys" feels like "the moment the lights go on at the end of a party, so [the album] would almost end a bit abruptly and maybe make you feel uncomfortable". The song received a lyric video on 9 April 2020. A remix of "Boys Will Be Boys" by Zach Witness is included on Lipa and the Blessed Madonna's remix album, the DJ mix-crafted Club Future Nostalgia that was released on 28 August 2020. The original version of the remix was released on 11 September 2020.

The Blessed Madonna performed a salsa rendition of the remix at Lipa's Studio 2054 livestream concert on 27 November 2020. Lipa opened the 15th annual Billboard Women in Music ceremony on 10 December 2020 with a stripped-down performance of "Boys Will Be Boys", the singer's first performance of the song. She wore a frothy black tulle Giambattista Valli Haute Couture gown and sang in front of a blank backdrop. For the performance, Lipa was accompanied by string players, who were occasionally illuminated to show their silhouettes. The song was also included on the setlist of Lipa's 2022 Future Nostalgia Tour.

== Critical reception ==
In a positive review for DIY, Elly Watson named "Boys Will Be Boys" a "euphoric ballad" and stated it "further cements" that Lipa "will be going down in pop history as one of the best". Craig Jenkins of Vulture thought the song is the "purest expression" of Lipa's statements about feminism and that it says Lipa's "only scratched the surface of what she's capable of". In The Times, Jonathan Dean viewed the song as a "fascinating" and "jaunty closing number" that is "pointed" and "incredibly catchy". The Financial Times's Ludovic Hunter-Tilney praised it for being "sharply written". For The Daily Telegraph, Neil McCormick perceived the song to be a "genuinely uplifting modern feminist singalong that pulls no punches". Kitty Empire of The Observer dubbed the song an "acerbic outro" while The Jakarta Post's Fajar Zakhri regarded it as "a feminist manifesto that closes the album on a high note".

Maura Johnston of Entertainment Weekly called "Boys Will Be Boys" an "anti-misogyny lament" but thought it was a lapse and "muddles its message". Writing for The Guardian, Laura Snapes viewed it as the "only predictable 2020 pop move" on Future Nostalgia, while also naming it a "grandiose closer" that could've used more "spoken-word camp". She additionally thought that a "Queen-like cheek" instead of a kids' choir would have gotten Lipa's point across better. In a negative review from Rolling Stone, Brittany Spanos perceived that the song failed because "it sounds too tied to the pop trends of 2020" and that it lacks "the rest of the album's warmth and oomph". Sal Cinquemani of Slant Magazine thought the song was an "enervating" way to close Future Nostalgia as the album had a sense of escapism. Gigwise's Jordan Emery praised the goal and message but viewed it as a "lushly orchestrated ballad" that is "clumsily handled".

== Track listing ==
- Digital download and streaming – Zach Witness remix
1. "Boys Will Be Boys" (Zach Witness remix) – 3:54

== Personnel ==
- Dua Lipa – vocals
- Koz – production, synthesizer, drums, bass
- Rupert Christie – additional production, arrangement, engineering
- Lorna Blackwood – vocal production, programming
- Drew Jurecka – string arrangement, string engineering, violin, viola, baritone, violin,
- Todd Clark – backing vocals
- Kennedi – backing vocals
- Dan Bingham – piano
- Isabel Gracefield – piano engineering
- Cameron Gower Poole – vocal engineering
- Jay Reynolds – mixing
- Chris Gehringer – mastering
- Will Quinnell – assistant mastering
- Stagecoach Epsom Performing Arts Choir – backing vocals
  - Adrian Murphy – backing vocals
  - Ronnie Gould – backing vocals
  - George Rodber – backing vocals
  - Kathryn Maloney – backing vocals
  - Colin Li – backing vocals
  - Daniel Sindall – backing vocals
  - Maria CKTangonan – backing vocals
  - Lucia Cohen – backing vocals
  - Nathaniel Buckley – backing vocals
  - Oliver Buckley – backing vocals
  - Jack Meredith – backing vocals

== Charts ==
Chart performance for "Boys Will Be Boys"
| Chart (2020) | Peak position |
|---|---|
| Lithuania (AGATA) | 78 |
| Portugal (AFP) | 148 |

== Certifications ==
Certifications and sales for "Boys Will Be Boys"
| Region | Certification | Certified units/sales |
|---|---|---|
| Brazil (Pro-Música Brasil) | Platinum | 40,000^{‡} |
^{‡} Sales+streaming figures based on certification alone.
