= Hallucinate (song) =

2020 single by Dua Lipa

Single by Dua Lipa

from the album Future Nostalgia
- Released: 10 July 2020
- Recorded: 2020
- Studio: TaP (London); Pulse (Silverlake)
- Genre: Disco-house
- Length: 3:28
- Label: Warner
- Songwriters: Dua Lipa; Samuel George Lewis; Sophie Frances Cooke
- Producers: Stuart Price; SG Lewis

Dua Lipa singles chronology
"Break My Heart" (2020)	"Hallucinate" (2020)	"Un Día (One Day)" (2020)

Music video
- "Hallucinate" on YouTube

"Hallucinate" is a song by English singer Dua Lipa from her second studio album Future Nostalgia (2020). The song was written by Lipa alongside Frances and SG Lewis. The latter of the three also handled the production with Stuart Price. The song was released through Warner Records for digital download and streaming on 10 July 2020 as the album's fourth single. It is a disco-house song with dance-pop, electro swing, psychedelic and synth-pop elements. Set to EDM rhythms and retro beats, the lyrics describe how crazy love can make one feel.

"Hallucinate" was well received by music critics. Many complimented the song's dance sound and the production as well as the 1990s and 2000s styles used in the production. The song appeared on numerous best songs of 2020 year-end lists, including ones published by The Guardian, The Line of Best Fit and Rolling Stone. Commercially, the song peaked at number 31 on the UK Singles Chart, while charting within the top 50 of charts in Hungary, Ireland, Lithuania, Scotland and Slovenia. It is certified gold in Brazil, New Zealand and the UK, as well as platinum in Poland.

The animated music video for "Hallucinate" was directed by Lisha Tan and was inspired by Studio 54, the golden age of animation and the 1970s disco heyday. In the video, Lipa's character goes on a hallucinatory journey after smelling a flower, that goes from good trip to bad trip and vice versa constantly. Critics complimented the trippiness of the video and it won animation, general video at the 2021 Webby Awards. The song was further promoted with the release of remixes by Paul Woolford, Tensnake and Mr. Fingers. Lipa performed the song on several occasions, including BBC Radio 1's Live Lounge, Elton John AIDS Foundation Academy Award Party and the 2021 Brit Awards.

== Writing and production ==
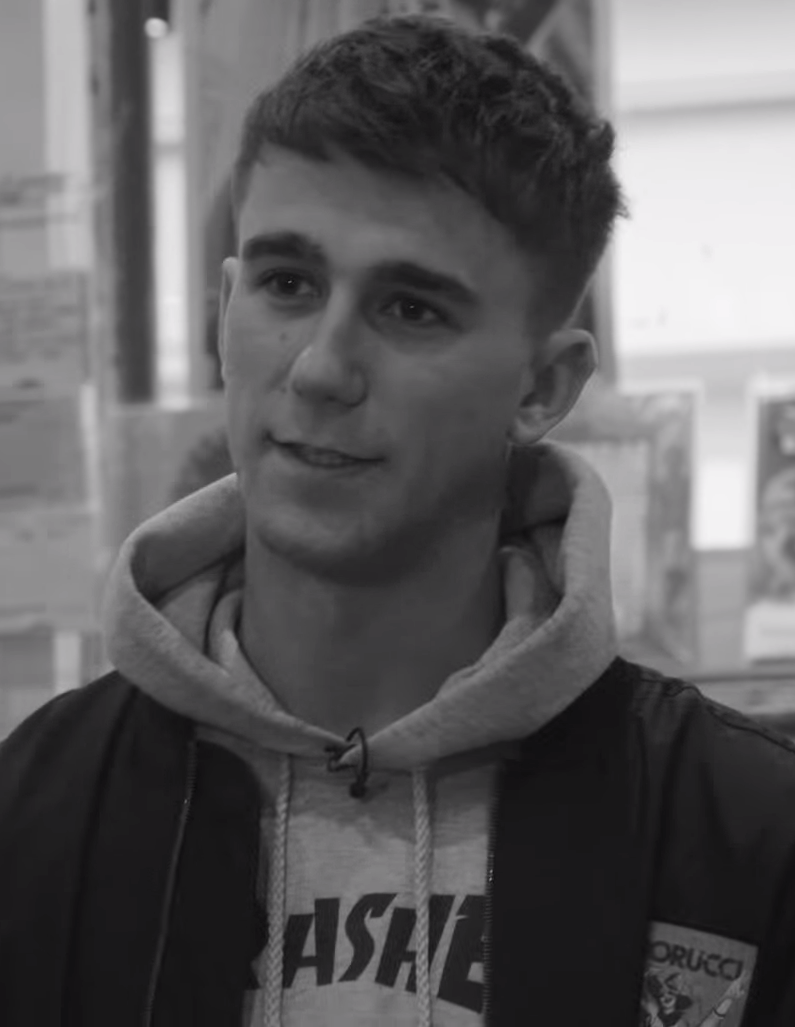
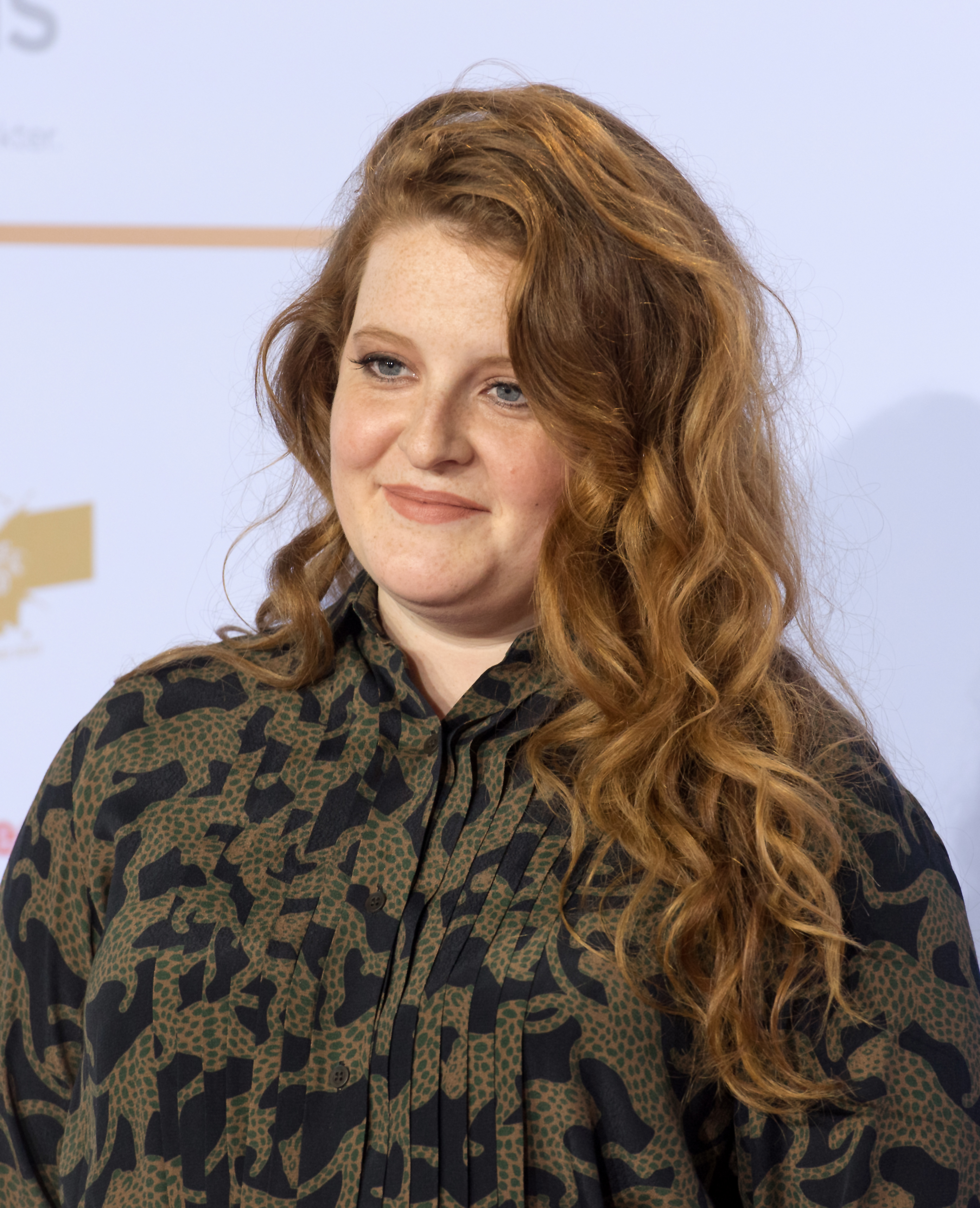
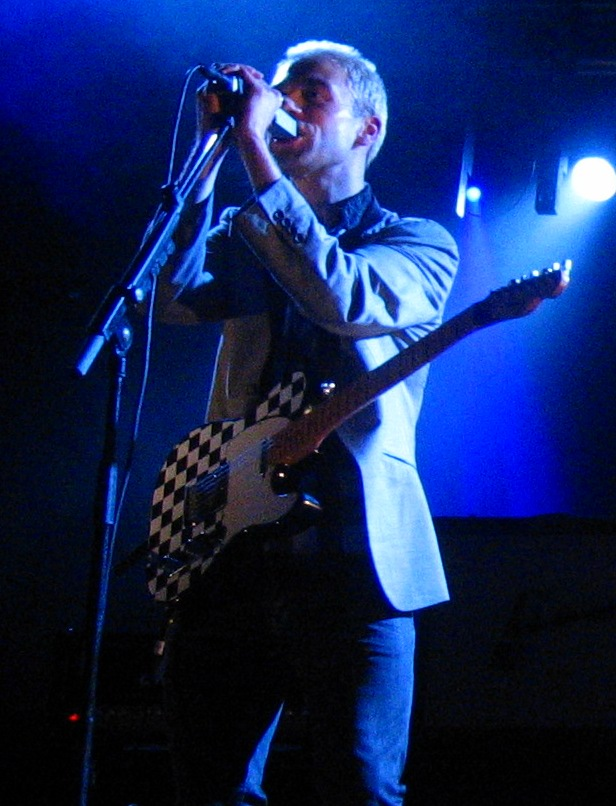
"Hallucinate" was co-written by SG Lewis (pictured left) and Frances (pictured middle), while Stuart Price (pictured right) contributed to the production.

"Hallucinate" was originally written by Frances and SG Lewis, the same day in which Lewis created the instrumental for his song "Feed The Fire" (2020). They did not finish the song, but created parts of it and had rough structures of what the song could be. The duo ended up playing it for Joe Kentish, the A&R for Dua Lipa's label. Kentish ended up sending the song to Lipa who, after hearing it, contacted Lewis about her admiration of it. Lipa and Lewis originally connected through Frances and they had known each other for a while as they ran in the same London circles, but they never wrote together; he did a remix of her 2017 song "New Rules". The three of them then got into the studio to finish the song, which did not take very long. Lewis recalled that Lipa took the song to "another level" and that it was quite easy to finish. He also served as the song's producer. After the song was finished, Stuart Price began doing some additional production across Future Nostalgia, eventually coming upon "Hallucinate", in which he added some production items. The song was recorded at Pulse Music in Silverlake with the vocals being recorded at London's TaP Studio. Price mixed the song at Tracques (Note: The location of Tracques is not indicated in the liner notes of Future Nostalgia: The Moonlight Edition.) while Chris Gehringer mastered it at Sterling Sound in Edgewater, New Jersey.

== Music and lyrics ==
"Hallucinate"
A disco-house song set to a synth baseline and EDM rhythms, "Hallucinate" describes how crazy love can make one feel.

"Hallucinate" runs for a total of 3 minutes and 28 seconds, and is composed in 4/4 time and the key of B♭ major, with a tempo of 122 beats per minute. The verses follow a B♭5–G♭–A♭ chord progression, whilst the chorus adds an additional E♭ chord to the sequence. The song has a structure of verse, pre-chorus, chorus, verse, pre-chorus, chorus, middle eight, chorus. Described by Lipa as her "festival song," "Hallucinate" is a disco-house track. The song features soulful flashes and a funky melody, and incorporates elements of 1990s and 2000s music, as well as dance-pop, electro swing, psychedelic, and synth-pop genres.

The production consists of a looped bass, pianissimo synthesizers, hi-hats, a synth bassline, mercilessly scythed violins, cowbells, EDM rhythms, a post-disco house groove, and retro drum beats, categorized as disco-house. Lipa showcases her higher vocal register, with her vocals ranging from F_{3} to D_{5}. She also contributes a 1990s diva hook with husky vocals. The lyrics evoke different sensory experiences, and describe how crazy love can make one feel. It sees Lipa engaged in an all-consuming, addictive love and celebrating carnality and physicality as the gateway to higher ground.

This is quite different from the other songs on the album, which all tie in together. But I just wanted this to be like a fun '90s dance track. It felt so freeing. It makes me so happy.

— Lipa talking about "Hallucinate".

== Release and promotion ==
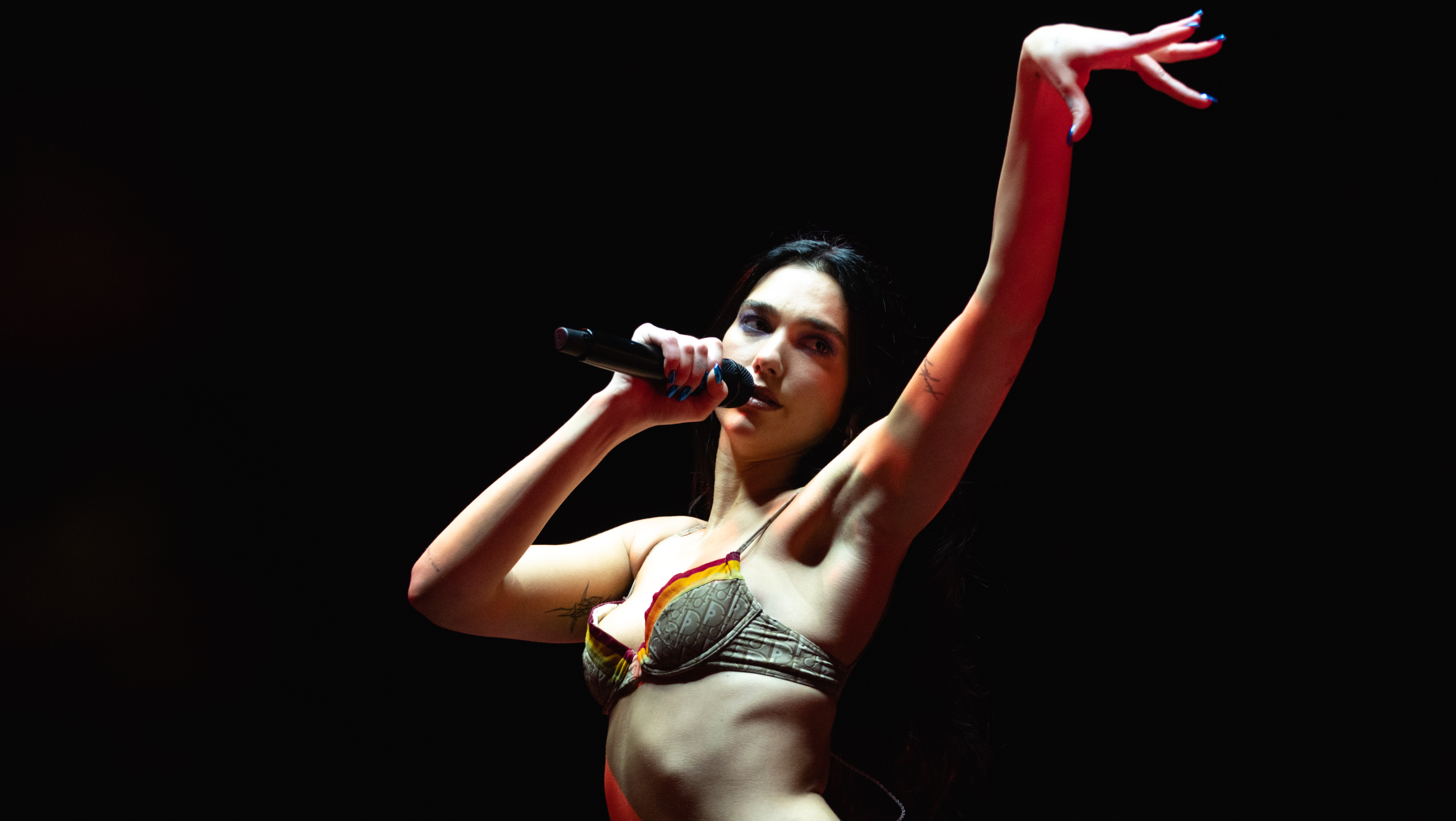
Lipa performing "Hallucinate" on the Future Nostalgia Tour in 2022

"Hallucinate" was released through Warner Records on 27 March 2020 as the seventh track on Lipa's second studio album, Future Nostalgia. The following month, Lipa confirmed that the album would receive another single following the release of "Break My Heart". On 3 July 2020, Lipa announced that "Hallucinate" had been chosen as the next single and revealed its cover art. The song was released for digital download and streaming on 10 July 2020 as the album's fourth single. The song was promoted with a lense on Snapchat. Lipa held a contest for a fan to create an Instagram filter, which was ultimately chosen and promoted on the app. "Hallucinate" themed stickers were also promoted on the app. The song received a lyric video on 9 April 2020.

Lipa performed "Hallucinate" for the first time at her livestream concert, Studio 2054 on 27 November 2020. The singer wore a skin-tight jumpsuit with a crystal-embellished design and performed in a sci-fi themed set with a moon in the background. She has performed the song on other occasions, including a stripped-back version of the song at BBC Radio 1's Live Lounge, and at the Elton John AIDS Foundation Academy Award Party. On 11 May, Lipa performed it as a medley with other Future Nostalgia tracks at the 2021 Brit Awards. The song was included on the setlist of Lipa's 2022 Future Nostalgia Tour. It's also included on the setlist of Lipa's 2024 Radical Optimism Tour.

== Critical reception ==
"Hallucinate" was met with positive reviews from music critics. Neil Z. Yeung of AllMusic called "Hallucinate" a "rapturous out-of-body rave", while Entertainment Weekly's Maura Johnston labelled it "stardust-dipped". In Rolling Stone, Brittany Spanos viewed the song as a "gorgeous euphoria" while also recommending some club remixes. In The Guardian, Laura Snapes wrote that the chorus "seems to enter an interstellar dimension". Of the same newspaper, Luke Holland called the chorus, "bigger than a God's tea cosy" as well as writing it "feels constructed by boffins in a hermetically sealed lab to be the most effective chrome-plated slammer it can possibly be". For PopMatters, Nick Malone stated it "flourishes" in the chorus as well as praising its hook, but criticized its baseline, writing it betrays what an obvious hit is. Richard S. He of Junkee noted its aim for early 2000s pop-disco, similar to Minogue and Moloko.

In The Daily Telegraph, Neil McCormick said that even though "Hallucinate" is a "minor track", it keeps up "the melody and movement with a spirit of sensual fun that would make Kylie Minogue weak with envy". For The Line of Best Fit, Chris Taylor viewed the song as a "blissful early '00s club floor-filler, the kind that gets limbs and sweat flying everywhere with abandon". In a positive review from Idolator, Mike Nied called it a "glory" and a "balls-to-the-wall delight bound to send your heart rate skyrocketing". He concluded by calling the chorus "stutter-riddled" and "a sing-along moment". Courteney Larocca of Insider wrote that it transports one to a "'80s jazzercise class or an underground rave", while Callie Ahlgrim of the same website praised how it hooks the listener in and labelled it "pop perfection". musicOMH's Nick Smith praised "Hallucinate" for having listeners on "the '90s dancefloor".

Uproxx's Caitlin White categorized the song's aesthetic as "neon-tinted" while Alex Abad-Santos of Vox called it a "starship laser-beam spectacle". Crack Magazine writer Michael Cragg thought it is equally as incredible as "Don't Start Now" and categorized its sound as a Daft Punk remix of a single from Madonna's Confessions on a Dance Floor (2005) era. Writing for Wonderland, Bailey Slater noted that the song has that "blissful beach pop clubbiness of the best 2000's pop". In a mixed review from Under the Radar, Conrad Duncan stated "Hallucinate" does a "faithful impression of 2000s disco-house", but criticized it, writing "it might as well have been written as radio fodder for 2004". In Slant Magazine, Sal Cinquemani called it the most "bald-faced gesture" on Future Nostalgia, and wrote it would be a highlight on a "lesser album" but stating it feels "generic" being "sandwiched" between "Pretty Please" and "Love Again".

"Hallucinate" placed on numerous best songs of 2020 year-end lists. The Line of Best Fit and the Indian edition of Rolling Stone hailed it as 2020's second best song. The song placed at number three on a year-end list published by DIY and number eight on Crack Magazine's year-end list. The Quietus ranked the song at number 24. In The Guardian, the song was ranked as the 15th best song of 2020, and the song placed on lists published by the publication's writers Marcus Barnes and Alim Kheraj. It additionally placed on an unranked Glamour year-end list.

== Commercial performance ==
Upon the release of Future Nostalgia, "Hallucinate" found success throughout Europe as an album track, charting at number 92 in Greece, 28 in Hungary, 99 in Italy, 35 in Lithuania, 89 in Portugal, 67 in Slovakia, and 73 in Spain. It additionally entered the UK Official Audio Streaming Chart at number 48, the UK Singles Downloads Chart at number 82 and the NZ Hot Singles Chart at number 7. In the United Kingdom, "Hallucinate" was the most streamed album track from the album upon its release. Following its single release, "Hallucinate" debuted at number 65 on the UK Singles Chart issue dated 24 July 2020. In its ninth week, the song reached a peak of number 31 and lasted for a total of twelve weeks on the chart. In October 2024, the song was awarded a platinum certification by the British Phonographic Industry (BPI) for 600,000 track-equivalent unit sales in the United Kingdom.

On Billboard's Global Excluding U.S chart, "Hallucinate" debuted at number 159 in the chart's first week, 19 September 2020, and lasted for three weeks. The song also spent three weeks on the Euro Digital Song Sales, peaking at number 16. In July 2020, it re-entered the NZ Hot Singles chart to reach a new peak of number 5 and later, Recorded Music NZ (RMNZ) awarded the song a platinum certification for track-equivalent unit sales of 30,000 units in the country. The song reached number 40 and seven respectively on the Irish Singles Chart and Scottish Singles Chart. In Croatia and Slovenia, the song reached respective peaks of 11 and 31. On the Dutch Single Top 100, the song debuted at number 55 on the chart issue dated 1 August 2020. The song spent ten weeks on the chart, reaching its peak of number 55 in its third week. It also reached number 20 on the Dutch Top 40 chart. "Hallucinate" received gold and platinum certifications from Pro-Música Brasil and the Polish Society of the Phonographic Industry (ZPAV), respectively, for track-equivalent sales of 20,000 units in Brazil and Poland.

== Music video ==
=== Development and release ===
After choosing "Hallucinate" as Future Nostalgia's fourth single, Lipa approached production company The Mill, an animation studio Titmouse, Inc. and director Lisha Tan with a 2D animated music video idea for the song, inspired by the 1970s disco heyday, with "the wacky characters, different rooms, diverse color palettes and a sense of never knowing which direction the psychedelic journey will take you on." Tan then took the treatment began looking at iconic photos from the disco aesthetic of the 1970s and Studio 54, compiling references and inspirations from the debauched behavior and crazy costumes everyone was wearing. They also were inspired by psychedelic themes, creating "dream" and "nightmare" sequences and imagining what would go in them. Tan additionally based much of the video on the track's lyrics, where she listened to the song at least 20 times to absorb the meaning. To be authentic, they used details from Lipa's real life, where in the dream sequence, Lipa is seen in a flower field as well as dancing alongside her pygmy goat pets; In the nightmare sequence, she sees her biggest fear, clowns.

The project was created during lockdowns due to the COVID-19 pandemic, with teams working in London, Los Angeles, and Paris. They did virtual sessions where they brainstormed ideas and worked together in "one seamless digital room". Tan gave the design team a general brief and parameters and let them embrace bringing the character to life. They reviewed sketches and collaborated by tweaking specific elements. The team also spent much time discussing how the sequences would work with Tan's rough sketches and style frames and split up into teams for each "act" of the video. The teams were in constant communication, asking questions and using video chats. Lipa's choreographer Charm La'Donna also helped by filming dance moves, mannerisms and reference poses from her home to infuse accuracy into Lipa's character. Sound effects were also added to the track, using 360 reality audio. On 21 April 2020, Lipa confirmed that she was working on the music video for Future Nostalgia's fourth single. She announced the release of the music video on 8 July 2020. The visual premiered via YouTube on 10 July 2020.

I wanted the video to feel, as a viewer, like you are on a rollercoaster with a sense of constant forward-motion. There is the tingle of anticipation in the beginning, then multiple ups and downs, before you burst out at the end, triumphant!

— Director Lisha Tan discussing the video's intentions.

=== Synopsis ===
An animated Lipa dancing with bunnies and ice cream cones in the music video

The video opens with an animated Lipa inhaling stars in the sky. It then cuts to her performing in a black and white club, for a crowd of early 20th-century style cartoon characters with big eyes and bulbous shapes. She wears a white bodysuit and tall go-go boots of the same colour. Her backup podium dancers include muscular men and raunchy women, who have stars for heads. Lipa is then offered a flower from a character in the crowd with a heart-shaped head. After smelling it, rainbows start spiraling in her eyes, and then she is taken on a psychedelic trip.

The adventure begins with neon-rainbow doors opening to gloved hands waving jazz hands towards Lipa walking down a hallway and dancing, before her image duplicates. She is then seen dancing with wide-eyed cartoon unicorns, vegetables, rainbows, ice cream cones and bunnies as well as on a disco floor in several colourful settings. Love potions are also seen pouring heart swirls around Lipa's face. After landing in a flower field, Lipa is sucked into the underground to eventually be scared by clowns and skeletons before she is sucked into the skeleton's mouth where she begins to cry. After breaking free from the skeleton, she is seen flying through the cosmos like a superhero, dancing on a giant disco ball and flying with dolphins, with the video ending with Lipa entering into an interstellar portal and awakening from her trip.

Studio 54 and Alice in Wonderland together. You smell the flower or you drink the little magic potion bottle and you start hallucinating. You go from good trip to bad trip to good trip again.

— Lipa explaining the visual's plot and concept.

=== Reception ===
Gil Kaufman of Billboard labelled the music video "trippy" and "spaced-out", while also calling its settings "the weirdest club you've ever seen" and "a bizarro world". Of the same magazine, Jason Lipshutz praised Tan's directing and Lipa's delivery while also comparing the atmosphere to Studio 54. Jon Blistein of Rolling Stone called it "delirious" and "wild". For Entertainment Tonight, Corey Atad called the video "trippy", while also comparing it to 1930s cartoons and Betty Boop. DIY called Lipa's character "badass". Entertainment Weekly's Nick Romano compared the characters to cartoons from the 1930s and 1940s while also writing Lipa "transforms into the spiritual descendant of Betty Boop". Wongo Okon of Uproxx wrote it is "styled after early cartoons from a century ago" and called the storyline "colorful" and "psychedelic". In NME, Rhian Daly noted the video's inspirations from Studio 54 aesthetic and the iconic era cartoons. Marni Zipper of Radio.com called it "eccentric", "beautiful", "glittery" and "animated glory".

For Nylon, Claire Valentine wrote about the storyline stating it is a "strange dancefloor trip inside of her mind". Emily Gosling of Creative Boom labelled the video "colourful" and "feel-good". For V, Dante Silva called the video "anachronistic" and its point "nonsensical". In The Face, Erica Russell thought Lipa's character was "like a cross between Betty Boop and Jessica Rabbit" that "bounces around a psychedelic fantasy world populated by retro, rubber hose Fleischer-style cartoons" with a "colorful Cuphead-meets-Cool World aesthetic". She went on to note that it deviates from Lipa's typical "sultry, choreography-focused music video style" and "offers a fresh product for fans to consume" while also allowing Lipa to "display her playful and energetic personality through a colorful, physics-defying cartoon magnifying glass". The music video for "Hallucinate" won animation, general video at the 2021 Webby Awards.

== Vertical video ==
A vertical video for "Hallucinate" was released 10 July 2020. It was produced by Blink Ink with executive production by Josef Byrne. The video was created by Connor Campbell and Harry Butt, a first time collaboration between the two, who created the visual in five days. Campbell, a motion designer and art director, and Butt, a graphic designer, had been wanting to work together on something since the beginning of 2020. The project started with the words "90s rave", and they were given a week to finish. The two immediately attempted to come up with some classic tropes such as lasers, strobe lights, and dancers. They also considered rave flyers and vivid 1990s-era clothing.

Campbell and Butt worked from opposite sides of the United Kingdom due to lockdown procedures associated with the COVID-19 pandemic; Campbell worked in the countryside, where he ran into trouble not having the best internet connection. The two did many email introductions and Zoom meetings as there was a lot to consider and a lot of people to keep in the loop. Much conversation went into the visual's dancing figure as they did not want "overly-sexualized skinny 3D characters" because they did not want to mess with peoples mental health issues with body image. Due to their lack of time to make it, many of their designed typographic lockups were removed so they could swiftly move onto their next aspect of work, such as motion tests and quick experiments. Campbell described the video as a true fusion of his and Butt's skillsets.

== Remixes and other uses ==
English singer Declan McKenna covered "Hallucinate" in BBC Radio 1's Live Lounge. He stripped back the song, playing an acoustic guitar, and being accompanied by a piano and electric guitar. His delivery combined tender sentiments and lustful vocal bursts. DJ Ben Howell remixed the song with the BBC news theme, which caught the eye of both Lipa and BBC Radio 1 DJ Greg James. The remix ended up winning Remix of the Year at the 2020 BBC Radio 1 Lockdown Awards. A remix by Paul Woolford was released on 24 July 2020, and a week later on 31 July, Tensnake's remix was released.

Lipa and the Blessed Madonna's DJ Mix-crafted remix album Club Future Nostalgia includes Woolford's extended remix and a remix by Mr Fingers titled "deep stripped", released 28 August 2020, with the original Mr Fingers remix being released 11 September 2020. The DJ Mix version Woolford's remix samples "The Sun Can't Compare", performed by Larry Heard presents Mr. White, while the DJ Mix version of Mr Fingers' remix contains elements of "Another Man", written by Butch Ingram, and samples "Another Man" performed by Barbara Mason and "Hollaback Girl", performed by Gwen Stefani. He started creating the remix by adding some club-style concepts to Lipa's vocals, with the final version including gurgling bassline, slinky synths, and West End disco beats. A skeletal ambient track, he reduces Lipa vocals down to a whisper and incorporates elements of 1990s house and contemporary dance-pop. Matt Colton mastered Mr Fingers' remix at Metropolis Studios in London while Woolford's remix was mastered at StarDelta by Lewis Hopkin.

== Track listings ==
- Digital download and streaming
1. "Hallucinate" – 3:28
- Streaming – 360 reality audio
1. "Hallucinate" (360 reality audio) – 3:28
- Digital download and streaming – Paul Woolford remix
1. "Hallucinate" (Paul Woolford remix) – 3:58
- Streaming – Paul Woolford remix – Spotify single
1. "Hallucinate" (Paul Woolford remix) – 3:58
2. "Hallucinate" – 3:28
- Digital download and streaming – Paul Woolford extended remix
1. "Hallucinate" (Paul Woolford extended remix) – 5:13
- Digital download and streaming – Tensnake remix
1. "Hallucinate" (Tensnake remix) – 4:51
- Streaming – Tensnake remix – Spotify single
1. "Hallucinate" (Tensnake remix) – 4:51
2. "Hallucinate" – 3:28
- Digital download and streaming – Tensnake extended remix
1. "Hallucinate" (Tensnake extended remix) – 6:57
- Digital download and streaming – Mr Fingers deep stripped mix
1. "Hallucinate" (Mr Fingers deep stripped mix) – 8:07

== Personnel ==
- Dua Lipa – vocals
- SG Lewis – production, drums, guitar, keyboards, synthesizer programming
- Sophie Frances Cooke – backing vocals, string arrangement
- Stuart Price – production, drum programming, keyboards, mixing
- Lauren D'Elia – vocal production
- Chris Gehringer – mastering
- Will Quinnell – assistant mastering

== Charts ==
=== Weekly charts ===
Weekly chart performance
Chart (2020)	Peak position
Argentina Hot 100 (Billboard)	80
Brazil (Top 100 Airplay)	98
CIS Airplay (TopHit)	191
Croatia International Airplay (HRT)	11
El Salvador (Monitor Latino)	13
Euro Digital Song Sales (Billboard)	16
Global Excl. U.S. (Billboard) (Note: The Billboard Global Excl. U.S. chart was launched in September 2020. Therefore, "Hallucinate" did not have a full run on the chart.)	159
Greece (IFPI)	80
Hungary (Dance Top 40)	20
Hungary (Rádiós Top 40)	4
Hungary (Single Top 40)	28
Ireland (IRMA)	40
Italy (FIMI)	99
Lithuania (AGATA)	35
Mexico (Billboard Mexican Airplay)	22
Netherlands (Dutch Top 40)	20
Netherlands (Single Top 100)	55
New Zealand Hot Singles (Recorded Music NZ)	5
Portugal (AFP)	89
Scottish Singles Sales (Official Charts)	7
Slovakia Airplay (ČNS IFPI)	79
Slovakia Singles Digital (ČNS IFPI)	67
Slovenia (SloTop50)	31
Spain (Promusicae)	73
UK Singles (Official Charts)	31

=== Year-end charts ===
2020 year-end chart performance for "Hallucinate"
Chart (2020)	Position
Hungary (Dance Top 40)	97
Netherlands (Dutch Top 40)	91

2021 year-end chart performance for "Hallucinate"
Chart (2021)	Position
Hungary (Dance Top 40)	83
Hungary (Rádiós Top 40)	39

2023 year-end chart performance for "Hallucinate"
Chart (2023)	Position
Hungary (Dance Top 40)	93

== Certifications ==
Certifications and sales
Region	Certification	Certified units/sales
Austria (IFPI Austria)	Gold	15,000^{‡}
Brazil (Pro-Música Brasil)	Diamond	160,000^{‡}
Canada (Music Canada)	Platinum	80,000^{‡}
France (SNEP)	Gold	100,000^{‡}
New Zealand (RMNZ)	Platinum	30,000^{‡}
Norway (IFPI Norway)	Gold	30,000^{‡}
Poland (ZPAV)	Platinum	50,000^{‡}
Portugal (AFP)	Gold	5,000^{‡}
Spain (Promusicae)	Gold	30,000^{‡}
United Kingdom (BPI)	Platinum	600,000^{‡}
^{‡} Sales+streaming figures based on certification alone.

== Release history ==
Release dates and formats
Region	Date	Format(s)	Version	Label	Ref.
Various	10 July 2020	Digital download; streaming	Original	Warner	
New Zealand	12 July 2020	Radio airplay	Original	Warner	
Various	24 July 2020	Digital download; streaming	Paul Woolford remixes	Warner	
Various	31 July 2020	Digital download; streaming	Tensnake remixes	Warner	
Various	11 September 2020	Digital download; streaming	Mr Fingers deep stripped mix	Warner	
