= Studio 2054 =

2020 concert by Dua Lipa

- Livestream concert by Dua Lipa
- Location: Worldwide
- Venue: Printworks (London)
- Associated album: Future Nostalgia
- Date: 27 November 2020
- Duration: 70 minutes
- No. of shows: 4
- Guests: FKA Twigs; the Blessed Madonna; Miley Cyrus; Bad Bunny; J Balvin; Tainy; Angèle; Buck Betty; Kylie Minogue; Elton John
- Producers: Ceremony London
- Attendance: 5 million (Note: 5 million is the estimated viewership based on gathered data. Lipa's team estimated the number was actually closer to 9 million.)
- Budget: $1.5 million

Studio 2054 was a livestream concert by English singer Dua Lipa in support of her second studio album, Future Nostalgia (2020). The concert took place in four live streams on 27 November 2020 as part of American Express' Unstaged series. After being forced to postpone the Future Nostalgia Tour due to the COVID-19 pandemic, Lipa arranged for the livestream in order to perform songs from the album live. She used the livestream to fuel her fascination with Studio 54. Angèle, Bad Bunny, the Blessed Madonna, Buck Betty, Elton John, FKA Twigs, J Balvin, Kylie Minogue, Miley Cyrus and Tainy performed as guests.

Studio 2054 was filmed at London's Printworks venue in custom built sets. The concert received generally positive reviews, many of whom praised Lipa's stage presence and performance. Some criticized the many guest performers, specifically Elton John. The show had an attendance of 5 million people, breaking a record for viewership of a paid livestream. It also holds the Guinness World Record for highest tickets sales for a paid livestream by a female artist.

== Background and development ==
Production of Studio 2054 began in August 2020, but planning for it started before then and took nearly five months to put together. Dua Lipa was not originally on board with the livestream since she wanted to wait until she could perform in front of fans; however, her team put forward an idea to make it like a TV show and this changed her mind. Lipa additionally thought her fans were longing for some sort of human connection during lockdown protocols associated with the COVID-19 pandemic. The concert's name comes from the famous New York City nightclub, Studio 54; Lipa had always had a fascination with the nightclub and its varying personalities. With the concert, she wanted to have a modern take on the nightclub with several different artforms. Lipa stated that she would be unable to do this on tour, and described it as a "live music video."

The show was crafted in four acts and filmed in London's Printworks venue, a large warehouse. In the venue, custom-built sets were made that included "surreal tv shows, roller discos, ecstatic raves, trashy rocker hang outs, voguing ballrooms and diva style dressing rooms." Lipa also enlisted the help of musicians, dancers, skaters, aerialists, acrobats and surprise guests, with whom she created a bubble with to avoid COVID-19. They rehearsed for the show every day, six hours a day for one month. As lockdown restrictions in the UK were easing at the time, filming for Studio 2054 was able to proceed as normal. Participants in the show were constantly being tested for COVID-19. The production team also took over a hotel near to Printworks where all cast and crew could stay to maintain the bubble; they branded it as "Hotel 2054". About 240 people were included in the cast and crew. Lipa incorporated songs from her eponymous debut studio album (2017) and second album Future Nostalgia (2020), as well as the latter's companion remix album Club Future Nostalgia (2020), into the setlist. German apparel company Puma sponsored the event; due to this, all cast members wore Puma-branded outfits. Evian also sponsored the concert. Overall, the show cost $1.5 million to produce.

== Release and promotion ==
On 23 October 2020, Lipa postponed her fifth headlining concert tour, the Future Nostalgia Tour, for the second time, from January 2021 to September 2021 because of the COVID-19 pandemic. With the announcement, she also unveiled that she had some "fun" items to be revealed in the meantime. Three days later, Lipa revealed while announcing two 2020 American Music Awards nominees on Good Morning America that she had an exciting announcement coming on 28 October 2020. Later on the day of her initial announcement, Lipa posted a link to her website on Twitter. The website showed a title of "Studio 2054", and a countdown to 19:00 GMT on 28 October 2020 when an announcement would be made. Promotion for "Studio 2054" began appearing across London. The show was formally announced through a press release and Lipa's website; Lipa further promoted the livestream with an Instagram Live following the announcement. English singer Elton John joined her to talk about his experiences in Studio 54.

Several trailers were released in the lead up to the live show. Belgian singer Angèle, English singer FKA Twigs, American singer Miley Cyrus, Colombian singer J Balvin, Puerto Rican rapper Bad Bunny, Puerto Rican record producer Tainy, Australian singer Kylie Minogue, John, American DJ the Blessed Madonna, and British DJ Buck Betty were respectively announced as special guests following the livestream's announcement. Due to the pandemic, guests joined Lipa both in person and virtually. Studio 2054 was part of American Express' Unstaged series and was broadcast through LIVENow on 27 November 2020 via four livestreams at different times in different territories: the United Kingdom and Europe, South America, Central and North America, and Asia Pacific. In order to reach international viewers, deals were set up with demand-side platforms in areas where ticket sales did not make sense. In India, Lipa's team set up a deal with Gaana to stream the show, while it was streamed in China via QQ Music, KuGou, Kuwo and WeSing, through Tencent. Studio 2054 was made available to stream again on Live Now Global on 12 March 2021, along with a behind-the-scenes documentary titled The Story Behind the Show, which offers a look inside the production of the show.

== Synopsis ==
VIP-ticket holders got to experience exclusive behind the scenes footage from Studio 2054's rehearsals. The show was preceded by a few adverts for Yves Saint Laurent, Jaguar, and Morrisons, all featuring Lipa. It ran for 70 minutes. Studio 2054 was filmed with a 1980s-styled camera lens, and opened in a 1980s television show set for the first act, similar to that of British music chart show Top of the Pops (1964 – present). The set featured neon lights, geometric structures hanging from the ceiling, dry ice, and a 1970s-styled dance floor. The performance began with flashing lights and dancers cheering as Lipa made her way to an elevated platform to perform "Future Nostalgia"; as the enthusiastic dancers cheered around her, she confidently performed while flexing her biceps. She wore a custom, sequined The Attico bodysuit with long tassels. Lipa descends the podium and goes straight into a retro-disco choreographed rendition of "Levitating", which included a dance break in the middle with a bona fide guitar solo and the singer interacting with her live band. The singer continued into a slower number, "Pretty Please", before transitioning into an extended intro of "Break My Heart" that interpolated Donna Summer's "I Feel Love" (1977).

The second act saw Lipa changing outfits into a silver, custom-made Alexander Wang leotard and black boots, and beginning a performance of "Break My Heart". In the performance, she strutted through giant neon hula hoops while dancers ran with her. FKA Twigs then joined the show to premiere her and Lipa's unreleased track, "Why Don't You Love Me", wearing a black Nasir Mazhar butt-bearing bikini with knee-high boots. Twigs appeared on a darkened stage that was illuminated by a spotlight where she performed a pole dance solo, before Lipa joined her to end the performance with an embrace. Lipa then made her way to a roller disco set where she momentarily picked up a drink from the bar before waving to the Blessed Madonna, who appeared in the center DJ Booth. Lipa made her way to the booth to hug the Blessed Madonna, and ask her to play "Physical". The rendition of the song contained extra disco style, and Lipa performed sweaty aerobics choreography with dancers dressed in neon primary-coloured workout gear. At one point in the performance, the singer dropped to her knees while singing passionately. Following the performance, the Blessed Madonna performed a Club Future Nostalgia DJ mix that included a salsa remake of "Boys Will Be Boys" based on Zach Witness' remix, Gwen Stefani's "Hollaback Girl" (2005), and "Cosmic Girl" (1996) by Jamiroquai. During the mix, Lipa joined the Blessed Madonna once again in the DJ booth. Lipa performed "Cool" while standing in the middle of the set next. Roller skaters surrounded her and the mirrorball panned around the set. The end of "Cool" featured a phone ringing sound effect as an intro to "New Rules". Lipa and her dancers made their way to an abandoned warehouse space for the song's performance. During the performance, Lipa picked up a phone and slammed it down as well as performing "crab-like" choreography with her dancers.

The third act began with Lipa walking into a bordello-themed, pink and gold boudoir where her brother Gjin is playing FIFA 21 (2020) with Kalvin Phillips, Bukayo Saka, Jeremy Lynch and AJ Tracey. Lipa changed the channel on the TV to a VHS format of unreleased footage for "Prisoner" with Miley Cyrus. Lipa continued with a performance of "Un Día (One Day)" as J Balvin, Bad Bunny, and Tainy appeared on the vintage TV set in the corner to contribute their respective parts. She wore a new outfit: a Versace rhinestone-studded bustier top alongside black jeans and sneakers. Angèle then joined Lipa in a matching outfit to perform "Fever", during which the two danced around the set. The show moved into a New York City boiler room rave where Buck Betty performed as the DJ. She proceeded by performing "One Kiss" from behind the DJ deck as dancers were seen on the dance floor. Kylie Minogue then made her way towards the DJ deck to duet with Lipa on her song "Real Groove" from her fifteenth studio album Disco (2020). Minogue jumped onto the DJ deck during the performance and she stayed to also duet with Lipa on "Electricity".

For the final act, Elton John opened with a pre-recorded solo performance of his song "Rocket Man" that was projected on a wall, with dancers watching motionlessly, similar to an In Memoriam service. However, he was cut off during the first chorus as the camera panned to another space in the warehouse and Lipa performed "Hallucinate". The set was sci-fi themed with a moon included in the background and Lipa wore a skin-tight jumpsuit with a crystal-embellished design. Studio 2054 closed with a performance of "Don't Start Now", which contained elements of "Gimme! Gimme! Gimme! (A Man After Midnight)" (1979) by ABBA. The performance featured flashing neon lights paired with strict and doubly choreography. Lipa then went through all the sets featured in the show, before a huge glitter canon was set off as she screamed, "Yeah!" The cameras then panned out to reveal the whole set. VIP-ticket guests also got to attend a 20-minute after party with the Blessed Madonna following the show. Viewers got a fly on the wall view as the DJ played old-school disco classics including "Keep On Jumpin'" (1978) by Musique.

== Critical reception ==
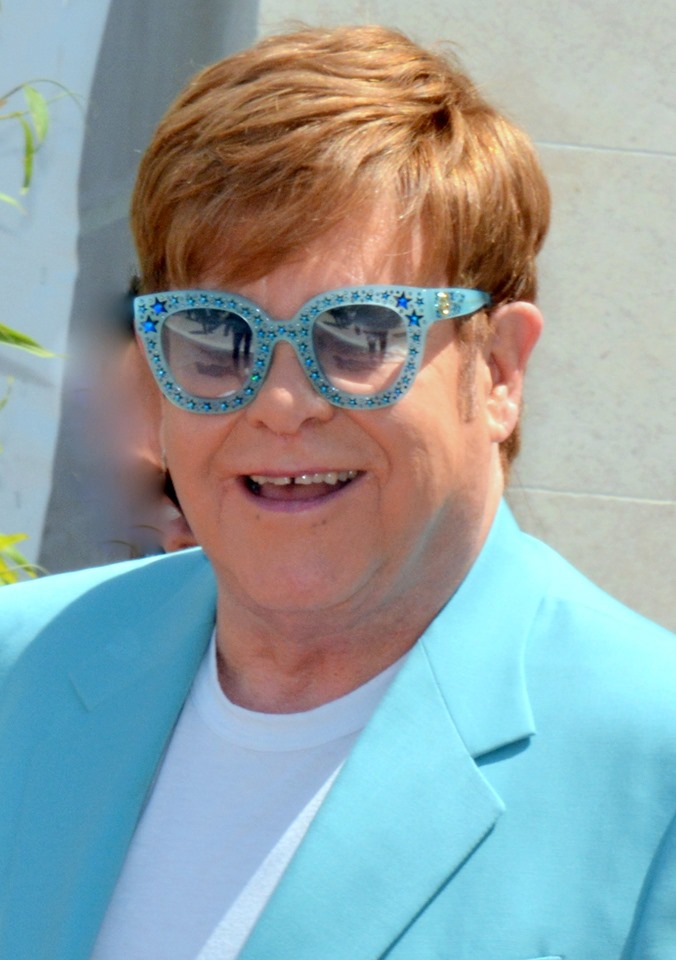
Critics had mixed opinions about English singer Elton John's (pictured) Studio 2054 performance.

Studio 2054 was met with generally positive reviews from critics. In a positive review for The Daily Telegraph, Neil McCormick gave the show five stars and viewed it as "the best livestream" of 2020. Specifically, he commended the show for being "exceptionally well-staged" and "an escapist fantasy from the sofa," as well as complimenting Minogue's performance and criticizing John's. Writing for The Times, Dan Cairns praised the "slick, polished" production values and thought that the show re-birthed Studio 54, excluding the drugs and "dodgy accounting." He went on to criticize it for looking like a "nightclub scene in a sleazy 1980s movie" and like having 1980s MTV on loop, as well as for the "mayhem [failing] to materialise." The Observer writer Kitty Empire agreed with McCormick in terms of Minogue and John's performance and noted the nod to disco, the 1980s, Europop, and club culture. Giving the show four stars out of five, she praised the "executes tunes, choreography and [flawless] costume changes" and how it is a "retro-futurist dance-party." The show was listed as one of the 29 best fashion moments of 2020 by Vogue's Emily Farra.

Studio 2054 was given three stars by The Guardian's Alexis Petridis, who commended Lipa's "spangly outfits" and her vocals that "never [miss] a note or [sound] breathless." On the other hand, he disapproved of the many guest appearances that he thought were a "damp squib," but also viewed the show as "weirdly fun" despite the shortcomings. NME's Rhian Daly awarded the show four stars; he thought that it completed Lipa's "evolution from good to great," as well as praising her performance and stage presence. He additionally called the show "an aesthetic wonderland of neon and glitter" but also disapproved of John's appearance. Chris Willman of Variety named the show a "happy dispatch from another galaxy, where dancing and dopamine both still occur, and joy is a thing of the present," and complimented it for being FX-free. He additionally praised Lipa's performance and criticized the guest performers. Allison Hussey from Pitchfork viewed the show as a "star-studded event." Both Amy Mackelden of Harper's Bazaar and V's Luana Harumi highlighted the guest stars' performances and Lipa's costumes.

In a positive review from DIY, Elly Watson thought Studio 2054 set the bar for live streams and described it as "all glitz, all glamour, all bangers, and all high production, with multiple fabulous costume changes, new sets, and choreographed dance moves." Narzra Ahmed of Clash highly praised Lipa's performance and vocals, and the guest appearances, as well as the "spectacular" concert as a whole. Alim Kheraj of i gave the show three stars and directing praise towards Lipa performance alongside her live vocals; however, he criticized the "New Rules" performance and the guest performers who did not perform in person, specifically John. In a mixed review for The Arts Desk, Joe Muggs gave the show three stars and had mixed feelings on the sets, Lipa's performance, the setlist and the guest appearances. However, he called the show "anything but a disappointment." For Billboard, Katie Atkinson and Keith Caulfield praised the high production values but also criticized the guest performers. They concluded by expressing their perforation for a live concert but thought it would sound nice as a live album with the seamless transitions between songs.

== Commercial reception and impact ==
Tickets for Studio 2054 went on sale worldwide at 08:00 BST on 30 October 2020 for £8.99, while VIP tickets were priced at £15.00. They went on sale earlier and at better prices for people who signed up on Lipa's website. Ticket prices increased on 3 and 16 November 2020, respectively. On 9 November 2020, tickets for Hungary, Czech Republic, Greece, Croatia, Slovenia, Kosovo, Albania, North Macedonia, Montenegro, Serbia, Bosnia and Herzegovina, Slovakia and Bulgaria went on sale. Studio 2054 brought in an estimated 5 million viewers, setting a record for attendance of a paid livestream. The number included 1.9 million unique log-ins from China, 95,000 from India and 284,000 ticket sales worldwide. The show was awarded the Guinness World Record for most tickets sold for a livestreamed concert by a solo female artist (current year). Lipa's team estimated that the actual viewership was closer to 8 or 9 million, as they presumed more than one person watched the show per ticket sold. The number also increased due to the show being available to watch until 6 December 2020, priced at £7.50. At its peak viewership, Studio 2054 had viewers in 150 countries. However, Lipa's team admitted that the stream underperformed in some territories. Following the concert, ticket sales for the Future Nostalgia Tour went up by 70%. The official revenue numbers for the show were not published, but Lipa's team stated it was a "profitable venture" and that she will probably do another livestream in the future regardless due to this.

== Set list ==
Adapted from Pitchfork, with additional information added from Billboard, i and NME.

Act I

1. "Future Nostalgia"
2. "Levitating"
3. "Pretty Please"

Act II

4. "Break My Heart" (with elements of "I Feel Love")
5. "Why Don't You Love Me" (with FKA Twigs)
6. "Physical"
7. The Blessed Madonna DJ mix interlude (contains "Boys Will Be Boys", "Cosmic Girl", and "Hollaback Girl")
8. "Cool"
9. "New Rules"

Act III

10. "Prisoner" (music video interlude with Miley Cyrus)
11. "Un Día (One Day)" (with J Balvin, Bad Bunny and Tainy)
12. "Fever" (with Angèle)
13. "One Kiss"
14. "Real Groove" (with Kylie Minogue)
15. "Electricity" (with Kylie Minogue)

Encore

16. "Rocket Man" (Elton John interlude)
17. "Hallucinate"
18. "Don't Start Now" (with elements of "Gimme! Gimme! Gimme! (A Man After Midnight)")

== Streams ==
List of streams, showing date, time and location
Date	Time	Location
27 November 2020	20:30 GMT	Europe
27 November 2020	19:00 PET	South America
27 November 2020	18:00 PT	Central and North America
27 November 2020	16:00 ICT	Asia Pacific

== Personnel ==
- Dua Lipa – lead performer

Guests

- FKA Twigs
- The Blessed Madonna
- Miley Cyrus
- J Balvin
- Bad Bunny
- Tainy
- Angèle
- Buck Betty
- Kylie Minogue
- Elton John
- Kalvin Phillips
- Bukayo Saka
- Jeremy Lynch
- AJ Tracey
- Gjin Lipa

Band

- Matty Carroll – bass
- Alex Lanyon – guitar
- Christina Hizon – keys
- Duayne Sanford – drums
- Naomi Scarlett – backing vocals
- Ciara O'Connor – backing vocals
- Izzy Chaise – backing vocals
- Matt Allen – backing vocals

Performers

- Sharon June – dancer
- Lamaar Manning – dancer
- Zacc Milne – dancer
- Jason Nguyen – dancer
- Diddie-Mie Lykke – dancer
- Kane Horn – dancer
- Robyn Laud – dancer
- Demi Rox Mensah – dancer
- Fatou Bah – dancer
- Samantha Grover – dancer
- Beccy Jones – additional dancer
- Zakiya Wellington – additional dancer
- Frankie Johnson – additional dancer
- Alexandra Schoendorf – additional dancer
- Codie Wiggins – additional dancer
- Israel Donowa – additional dancer
- Giuseppe Giofrè – additional dancer
- Naomi Weijand – additional dancer
- Renae Hughes – additional dancer
- Yves Cueni – additional dancer
- Alphonse Katty – skater
- Ayisha Alli – skater
- Christina Shand – skater
- Ciaran Reese – skater
- Dwayne Moona – skater
- Kailam Brown – skater
- Sadiq Ali – circus performer
- Joana Dias – circus performer
- Kieran Warner – circus performer
- Jacob Love – club kid
- Edi Kanhush – club kid
- Juniper Lai – club kid
- Nadia D Juma – club kid

Costuming

- Nawal Alkhedairy – personal assistant
- Lorenzo Posocco – stylist
- Samantha Lau – make up artist
- Anna Cofone – hair stylist
- Marc Ramos – hair assistant
- Rae Haydenn – styling assistant
- James Randall – set dresser
- Shay Malt – circus and club kids costumes
- Bart Cacciapaglia – cast hair and make up
- Matilde Caprilli – cast hair and make up
- Aidan D'Arcy – cast hair and make up
- Federico Sabatino – cast hair and make up
- Fabio Sarra – cast hair and make up
- Jacinta Spencer – cast hair and make up
- Charles Stanley – cast hair and make up
- Rosie Williams – cast hair and make up
- Caitlin Moriaty – wardrobe
- Isabella Damazio – wardrobe
- Cynthia Igbokwe – wardrobe

Crew

- Liz Clare – director
- Charm La'Donna – choreographer
- Alex Clark – assistant choreographer
- Vicki Amedume – circus choreographer
- Pixie Levinson – photographer
- Lorna Blackwood – vocal coach
- Paul Dallanegra – security
- Ronnie Frankilin – driver
- Winnie O'Connor – driver
- Kate Sinden – producer
- Nathaniel Hill – director of photography
- Hayley Collett – associate director
- Dan Winterburn – vision mixer
- Roger Dempster – floor manager
- Ben Sanchez – assistant floor manager
- Imogen Stoddart – production assistant
- Curtis Dunne – steadicam
- Charlie Bryan – camera operator
- Alex Dodd – camera operator
- Nick Kauffman – camera operator
- Alan Wells – spidercam
- Nick Bonnar – spidercam pilot
- Mark Sayers – spidercam technician
- Warren Buckingham – focus puller
- Nick Crew – focus puller
- Iwan Reynolds – focus puller
- Andy Scarth – sound supervisor
- Bradley Sparks – technician
- Simon Bryant – editor
- Tom Aston – colourist
- John Pearce – post production supervisor
- Matt Pitman – lighting and production designer
- Dan Crowther – lighting programmer and design assistant
- Ben Cash – associate lighting designer
- Flora Harvey – design assistant and content creator
- Ben Houghton – assistant
- Alex McMannus – assistant
- Pamela Pitman – administrator
- Kym Tan – handler
- Phil White – video installation
- James Lockey – content creator
- Chris Harris – rigger
- Adam Morris – lighting crew chief
- Andy Mitch – lighting technician
- Sam Jackson – lighting technician
- Chris Taylor – lighting technician
- Tom Bennett – lighting technician
- Tom Comrie – lighting technician
- Ryan Harrington – lighting technician
- Dean Bennetts – lighting technician
- Josh Corkerton – special effects technician
- George Baker – production manager
- Jonny Clark – site manager
- Judit Matyasy – production co-ordinator
- Molly Gordon – artist liaison
- Ria Byers – production assistant
- Will Nicholson – broadcast audio engineer
- Alex Cerutti – monitor engineer
- Brandon Reese – stage manager
- Callum Lloyd-Williams – playback technician
- Carl Lewis – guitar technician
- Richie Mills – drum technician
- Sapna Patel – rf technician
- Will Donbavand – audio post production
- Arthur Mazzer – audio technician
- Jamie Tinsley – audio technician
- Gideon Berger – creative director
- Paula Clark – producer
- Joe Garcia – production
- Edi Kanoush – production
- Ali Owen-Thomas – production manager
- Dan Cooper – head of set design
- Nienke Jognsma – head of props
- Jonny Godsmark – head of lighting
- Paul Mahoney – lighting technician
- Ian Parkyn – lighting technician
- Lloyd Town – lighting technician
- Scott Carter – lighting technician
- Ian Biggar – construction manager
- Carl Lenton – second build lead
- Natalie Perkins – scenic artist
- Terry Nixon – scenic artist
- Matt Rimmer – electrician
- Nick Roberts – carpenter
- Barnaby Pike – carpenter
- Dave Boken – carpenter
- Adam Blackburne – carpenter
- Vic Bhanabhi – carpenter
- Ben Burgis – carpenter
- Matt Steadman – carpenter
- Andrew Cheshire – technical drawings
- Chris Harris – rigger

Production companies

- Ceremony London – production, creative direction
- WFB Live – musical direction
- Procam Projects – camera equipment and crew
- Christie Lights – lighting supplier
- Creative Technology – video equipment
- BPM SFX – special effects
- Britannia Row Productions LTD. – audio equipment
- Block9 – set design
- Printworks – venue
- Pro Productions – flooring
- The Pantry Maid – catering
- Stage Miracles – stage hands
- Vibration – rigging

Management

- Ben Mawson – Tap Music
- Ed Millett – Tap Music
- Jules Baddeley – Tap Music
- Chris Mcillvenny – Tap Music
- Anna Neville – Tap Music
- Aria Alagha – Tap Music
- Wendy Ong – Tap Music
- Hannah Neaves – Tap Music
- Sarah Leon – Keep
- Kerry McKenna – Keep
- Max Boffee – Keep

== See also ==
- Future Nostalgia Tour
