= Future Nostalgia =

2020 studio album by Dua Lipa

- Standard edition cover

Studio album by Dua Lipa
- Released: 27 March 2020
- Recorded: January 2018 – December 2019
- Studios: TaP, the Bunker at 13, RAK, Sarm, Sleeper, Oddities (London); Green Oak, Diamond Mine, Zenseven (Los Angeles); Modulator (Toronto); Pulse (Silver Lake); The Windmill (Norfolk); Gold Tooth (Beverly Hills); Masterlink (Surrey)
- Genres: Dance-pop; disco-pop; electropop; nu-disco; pop-funk; power pop; synth-pop
- Length: 37:17
- Label: Warner
- Producers: Jeff Bhasker; Jason Evigan; Koz; Ian Kirkpatrick; SG Lewis; the Monsters & Strangerz; Stuart Price; Take a Daytrip; TMS; Andrew Watt

Dua Lipa chronology
Dua Lipa (2017)	Future Nostalgia (2020)	Club Future Nostalgia (2020)

Singles from Future Nostalgia
- 1. "Don't Start Now" Released: 31 October 2019; 2. "Physical" Released: 31 January 2020; 3. "Break My Heart" Released: 25 March 2020; 4. "Hallucinate" Released: 10 July 2020; 5. "Levitating" Released: 1 October 2020; 6. "Love Again" Released: 11 March 2021

Singles from Future Nostalgia (French edition)
- 1. "Fever" Released: 29 October 2020

Alternative cover
- The Moonlight Edition cover

Singles from Future Nostalgia: The Moonlight Edition
- 1. "We're Good" Released: 11 February 2021

Future Nostalgia is the second studio album by English singer Dua Lipa. It was released on 27 March 2020 by Warner Records. Lipa enlisted writers and producers including Jeff Bhasker, Ian Kirkpatrick, Stuart Price, the Monsters & Strangerz, and Koz to create a "nostalgic" pop and disco record containing influences from dance-pop and electronic music. The album was inspired by the music that Lipa enjoyed during her childhood.

The album was supported by six singles, along with the title track as a promotional single. "Don't Start Now" was released as the album's lead single, attaining both critical and commercial success and peaking at number two on both the UK Singles Chart and the US Billboard Hot 100. Other singles included the UK top-ten singles "Physical" and "Break My Heart", as well as a remix of "Levitating" featuring DaBaby. It reached the top five in the UK and the top in the US year-end Hot 100 chart of 2021. The album was originally scheduled to be released on 3 April 2020, but was moved forward after being leaked in its entirety two weeks earlier. To promote the album, Lipa embarked on the Future Nostalgia Tour, which commenced in February 2022.

Upon its release, Future Nostalgia received universal acclaim from music critics, many of whom praised the production, its cohesion and Lipa's stylistic evolution. Commercially, the album topped the charts in fifteen countries and reached the top ten in thirty-one countries. In the United Kingdom, it peaked atop the UK Albums Chart for four non-consecutive weeks, becoming her first album to do so as well as garnering her first-ever nomination for the Mercury Prize, and earning the Brit Award for British Album of the Year. At the 63rd Annual Grammy Awards, Future Nostalgia was nominated for Album of the Year and won Best Pop Vocal Album, whilst "Don't Start Now" was nominated for Record of the Year, Song of the Year and Best Pop Solo Performance.

Future Nostalgia was succeeded by its remix album, Club Future Nostalgia, which was released on 28 August 2020 to positive reviews from critics. A French edition of Future Nostalgia was released on 27 November 2020, which yielded the French number-one single "Fever". A reissue of the album, subtitled The Moonlight Edition, was released through Warner on 11 February 2021, along with its lead single, "We're Good".

== Background ==
After the release of Dua Lipa: Complete Edition in October 2018, the expanded deluxe edition of Lipa's debut album, and the single "Swan Song" in January 2019, released in promotion of Alita: Battle Angel (2019), Lipa confirmed that she was working on a new album. In October 2019, Lipa began teasing the album as a new "era," before clearing her social media later that month to announce the lead single, "Don't Start Now". Lipa stated that she cleared her social media in order to prove to herself that social media wasn't real, that one could post and choose to use platforms any way they wanted. She further elaborated that she wanted to start fresh with her new album, but she would always have her memories. Whilst promoting "Don't Start Now", Lipa confirmed that she would be announcing the album in late November or early December 2019, along with the release of the title track.

On 1 December 2019, Lipa revealed the album title through a tattoo on her left bicep with the title, Future Nostalgia, while also announcing its accompanying arena tour of the same name and that the album would be released in 2020. The following month, three songs ("Physical", "Break My Heart", and "If It Ain't Me", an unreleased collaboration with Normani) leaked online in a security breach. Shortly after on 29 January 2020, Lipa announced that the album would be released on 3 April of that year. The following day, the track list was revealed and the album was made available for pre-order. In late March, the entire album leaked and the release was brought forward by a week to 27 March 2020. Lipa additionally expressed her concern about releasing the album during the COVID-19 pandemic.

== Concept ==
=== Cover artwork ===
The cover artwork of Future Nostalgia was shot by French photographer, Hugo Comte, who also handled the creative direction and the photographs associated with the album's campaign, with Guillaume Sbalchiero handling the design. It was shot on 13 November 2019, and Lipa revealed it on 29 January 2020, along with the album's release date announcement. During shooting the promotional photography, Comte had one song on repeat for each shot to get Lipa in the mood for him to get the right shot.

[Lipa] really believed in me and gave me complete creative freedom. [When] I'm on set with Dua Lipa, I need to understand the way she sees herself. I need to find a balance between the vision she has of herself and the vision I want to create for her. [Future Nostalgia] is based on change. Her whole character, all her music is redefined. The whole concept is based around the transition between nostalgia and future. She's very determined. She's like a Marvel [superhero] or a cartoon character. She has super powers; she's incredible.

— Album photographer, Hugo Comte, talking about Lipa and the Future Nostalgia cover artwork.

The cover artwork of Future Nostalgia features Lipa in a Googie-esque retro vehicle, one that could be seen during the 1950s-themed restaurant scene in Pulp Fiction (1994). A dark sky with a blue moon, which was a stylistic choice, appears behind her. Lipa wears a 1950s-style button-down pink shirt, which is tied in a knot around her waist. Her accessories include gold hooped earrings, with a normal one in one ear and a misshaped one in the other, and numerous rings. She also wears long white gloves, which she holds the steering wheel with. Lipa has her blonde and brunette hair up in a bun.

=== Title ===
Lipa originally intended to call the album Glass House. After working on the album for nearly a year, Lipa came up with a new album title, Future Nostalgia, while on the way to a radio show in Las Vegas around the time of the 2018 American Music Awards. After figuring it out, Lipa messaged her A&R, in which they responded that it's like a baby name, they couldn't tell anyone. She wanted to create a record with the nostalgic memories of her childhood and the music her parents listened to and put a modern spin on it with futuristic elements, which is why she ultimately went with the title. It is meant to describe "a future of infinite possibilities while tapping into the sound and mood of some older music."

== Recording ==
Lipa began work on Future Nostalgia in August 2018 and finished in November 2019. However, during the first year of production, she was still promoting her first album on the Self-Titled Tour and was still figuring out the direction she wanted to go in. Lipa had begun thinking of ideas for the album before Dua Lipa was released in June 2017. After figuring out the album's title, she worked backwards, figuring out the sound and lyrical content she desired. She challenged herself to break out of her comfort zone to make music that could sit alongside her favourite classic pop songs, being inspired by Gwen Stefani, Madonna, Kylie Minogue, Moloko, Blondie, and Outkast. After touring, Lipa aspired to have a more live element on the record, mixed with modern electronic production, but to still have the pop sensibility of her first record. Lipa thought that her sound had "naturally matured."

The majority of the album was recorded in a nine-month period after figuring out its title, where she had sessions every day, including ones at Geejam Studios in Jamaica. Lipa recorded upwards of nearly 60 songs for the album, including unreleased collaborations with producers Max Martin, Nile Rodgers, Mark Ronson, and Pharrell Williams, as well as a collaboration with Normani titled "If It Ain't Me", and "Bad to You", a song with Ariana Grande. "Bad to You" was later released by Grande, Normani, and Nicki Minaj for the Charlie's Angels: Original Motion Picture Soundtrack, after Lipa and Grande were unable to finish their respective parts due to scheduling conflicts. A planned collaboration with Katy Perry titled "Ball & Chain" was also canceled due to scheduling issues. Another song that was intended for the album but did not make the cut, "Retrograde", was later recorded by Aleyna Tilki and released as her debut English-language single. Lipa's single "Un Día (One Day)" with J Balvin, Bad Bunny, and Tainy was revealed to be recorded during sessions for Future Nostalgia.

== Music and lyrics ==
Future Nostalgia is a dance-pop, electropop, nu-disco, pop-funk, synth-pop, power pop, and disco-pop record, with several 1980s and retrofuturism tropes, and elements of Eurodance, hi-NRG, house, techno, and R&B. Described by Lipa as a "nostalgic" pop record that "feels like a dancercise class," she took inspiration from the music of the 1970s, 1980s, 1990s, and 2000s to create a sound that felt familiar and brand-new at the same time. The album's structure includes sticky-sweet choruses, and catchy pop hooks, while it has campy productions, consisting of funk bass guitars, electronic beats, rubbery basslines, robotic vocoder backing vocals, chunky synths, lush strings, percolating drums, house-influenced piano chords, and disco strings. The album has themes of the transformative nature of romance, sex, inequality, empowerment, self-possession, the exploration of vulnerability, falling in love, breaking up, equality, hope, flirtation and affection.

Critics note similarities between the tracks on Future Nostalgia and the works of Blondie, Chic, Daft Punk, Lady Gaga, Gloria Gaynor, Debbie Harry, Jamiroquai, Madonna (Confessions on a Dance Floor, 2005), Kylie Minogue (Fever, 2001), Moloko, Olivia Newton-John, No Doubt, Outkast, Prince, and Nile Rodgers. Neil Z. Yeung of AllMusic described the sound of Future Nostalgia as "'70s disco, '80s dance-pop, and '90s club jams." In her review for The Independent, Helen Brown stated that Lipa "channels the zingy, electro-ambitions of the 1980s with remarkable freshness." Pitchfork's Anna Gaca viewed it as "a collection of sophisticated, hard-bodied pop-funk that gives way to slick, [Minogue]-inspired disco." Mesfin Fekadu from ABC News regarded the album as "a collection of upbeat, dance-flavoured, power pop gems."

I think it was trying to make the record sound as cohesive as possible so that it all feels part of the same story. And alongside the bass in multiple songs, I also have strings in multiple songs. I wanted to make this really organic in having a lot of live instrumentation. It is a very happy album. This album is purely about dancing and having fun and being free and being in love.

— Lipa on the album's direction, Variety.

=== Songs ===
Future Nostalgia opens with its title track, a playful and fun synth-pop and electro-funk song, with house, hip hop, and disco elements. It has an electronic production, that includes electroclash synths, disco beats, funk and grunge bass-popping, and a jazz piano progression. In the song, Lipa name-drops its producer, Jeff Bhasker, and American architect, John Lautner, while vocally making use of falsetto and spoken word deliveries. Lyrically, it deals with themes of feminism and self-reflection. The following track and lead single, "Don't Start Now", has empowerment themes and sees Lipa addressing an ex-lover about moving on from a relationship, using direct bullet point instructions. She uses her lower-register vocals, over a production consisting of cowbells, accented disco strings, and a rhythm guitar loop. Musically, it is a nu-disco song with elements of dance-pop and Eurodance. Synth-pop cut, "Cool", has inspirations from 1980s music and Prince. The song is about the initial rush of falling in love, painting a picture of a summer romance, with confidence and vulnerability themes, and reckless, youthful energy. Driven by a funk bass, glitter gel noises and a drum line embody the production, whilst Lipa contributes vocals with hopeful tones.

An upbeat and high energy song released as the second single from Future Nostalgia, "Physical" has a message about an intense and lustful relationship. A power pop and synth-pop song, it includes dance-rock, dark wave, and Italo disco elements, while Lipa's lower register vocal performance uses deadpan, spoken word, belts, and chants. The song shares a chorus line with Olivia Newton-John's 1981 single of the same name, and includes sawtooth wave synths, a synth flute, and hi-hats in its production. "Levitating" is an electro-disco, pop-funk, and nu-disco track, with elements of dance-pop, electronic, 1990s pop and R&B, power pop and space rock genres. It includes a Blondie-influenced rap by Lipa, while having nu-disco rhythms, disco strings, and talk box vocals production-wise. Lyrically, Lipa exposes her feelings for a significant other, through numerous outer space references. Electro-R&B track, "Pretty Please", has disco-pop details and soft-spoken vocals. Driven by a bass and click, the song has a stripped-back production, emphasizing its guitars and synths, while also including cowbells and pitch-modulated vocal effects. The lyrics see Lipa attempting to be really chill at the beginning of a relationship, but realizing that is unlike her, as she pleas for stress relief from her partner who slows that down.

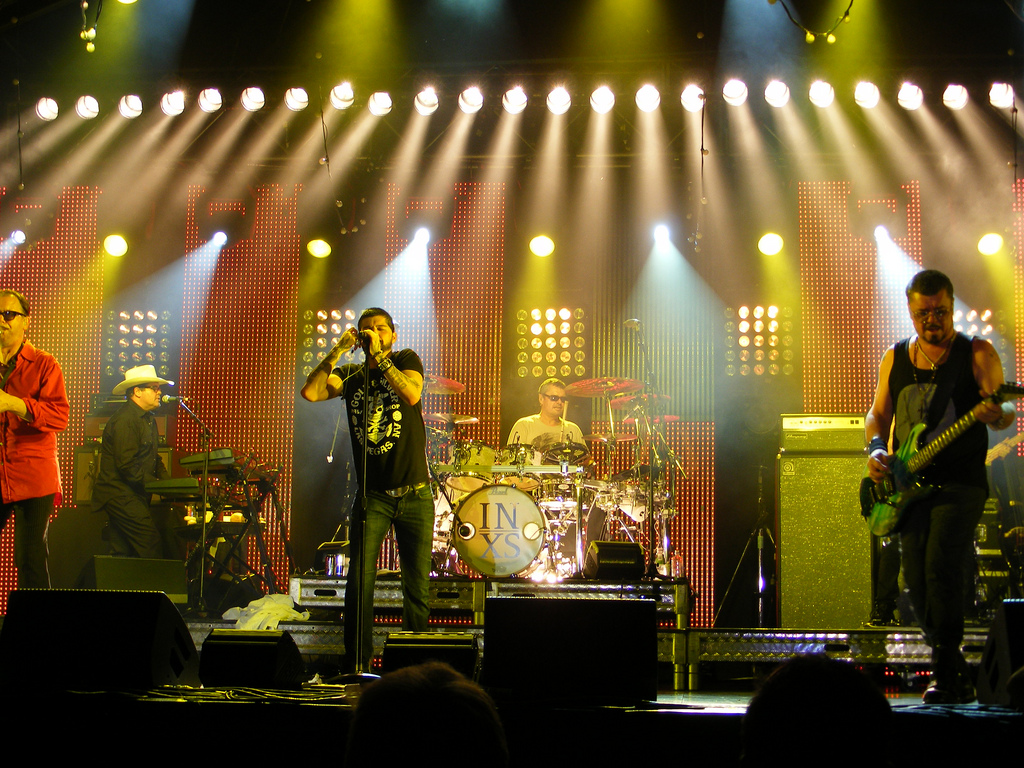
"Break My Heart" interpolates the rhythm-guitar melody from "Need You Tonight" by INXS (pictured).

Described by Lipa as her "festival song," "Hallucinate" is a disco and house track, with dance, electro swing, psychedelic, and synth-pop elements. Lipa showcases her higher vocal register, and contributes a 1990s diva hook. Lyrically, the song describes how crazy love can make one feel, over a production consisting of pianissimo synths, hi-hats, and orchestrations. Lipa's favourite song on the record, "Love Again", is a dance-pop, disco, and electro song, with a classic sound, that includes a sample of the trumpet from Lew Stone's 1932 recording "My Woman". The 21st-century nu-disco production is made up of orchestrations, including 1970s disco strings, violins, and an acoustic guitar. Its lyrics have heartbreak and personal growth themes, which see a faithful Lipa offering her heart to a new partner after an upsetting breakup. Lipa describes "Break My Heart" as a "celebration of vulnerability," seeing her question whether a new love will leave her broken-hearted, with lyrics comparing it to the COVID-19 pandemic's social distancing measures. It interpolates rhythm guitar melody from "Need You Tonight" (1987) by INXS, alongside Europop and dance beats, disco violins, and a techno-adjacent bassline as the production. Musically, it is a disco and dance-pop song, with a retro-futuristic sound, and elements of funk and house.

"Boys Will Be Boys"
A 16-second sample of the pre-chorus and repetitive chorus of "Boys Will Be Boys", a song illustrating the struggles that women go through in life.

"Good in Bed", is a hip hop-pop hybrid, which was widely compared to the works of Lily Allen. Its production uses off-kilter jazz piano plinking, gum-popping sound effects, and lo-fi keys, with fairy-like backing vocal harmonies, and Lipa contributing high octave whispers. The album's sole explicit track, it uses bad, mad, and sad rhymes, with lyrics about a relationship where good sex is the only thing holding two people together. The part of the chorus where "Ba-a-a-a-ad" is sung in Good In Bed is microtonal, descending from an E♭ to a C (3 semitones) in 5 notes (4 intervals) in the key of F Major. When interpreting the E♭ as the harmonic seventh of the root, this descending chromatic melody corresponds to the 28th to 24th harmonics of the root, because that also goes from the harmonic seventh to the perfect fifth in exactly 5 notes (4 intervals). Future Nostalgia closes with "Boys Will Be Boys", a baroque pop and chamber pop ballad turned anthem, with gospel elements. Lipa makes use of belting and chanting, over a melodramatic melody, disco beats, layered choral arrangements, marching band drums, and orchestral strings. Lyrically, the song speaks about the growing pains girls experience and how they have to grow up so fast, taking aim at male violence, sexual harassment, toxic masculinity, double standards, and misogyny, while having empowerment and feminism themes.

== Release and promotion ==
The album was issued on 27 March 2020, by Warner Records, Lipa's second to be released under the label. The standard edition was released on CD, cassette, vinyl, digital download and streaming. The vinyl was released on both coloured vinyl and a picture disc and the cassette was released in gold, pink, blue and yellow colours. The album was also released with a boxset that contains a yellow 12" vinyl, a photography book from the album's photoshoot, an art print, a thank you note from Lipa, a tattoo replica of Lipa's "Future Nostalgia" tattoo, stickers and one of five polaroid images. The Japanese edition of the album was released on CD on 3 April 2020, the album's intended release date. It contains three additional tracks, two remixes of "Don't Start Now" and a remix of "Physical". Two new editions of the album were released on 27 November 2020: a new CD edition with "Levitating" feat. DaBaby and "Fever" with Angèle as bonus tracks packaged in a slipcase and the bonus 2CD edition which includes the original album along with "Levitating" feat. DaBaby as a bonus track on the first disc plus the DJ Mix version of Club Future Nostalgia remix album on the second disc. The first was released exclusively in France while the latter was released worldwide.

=== Performances and tour ===
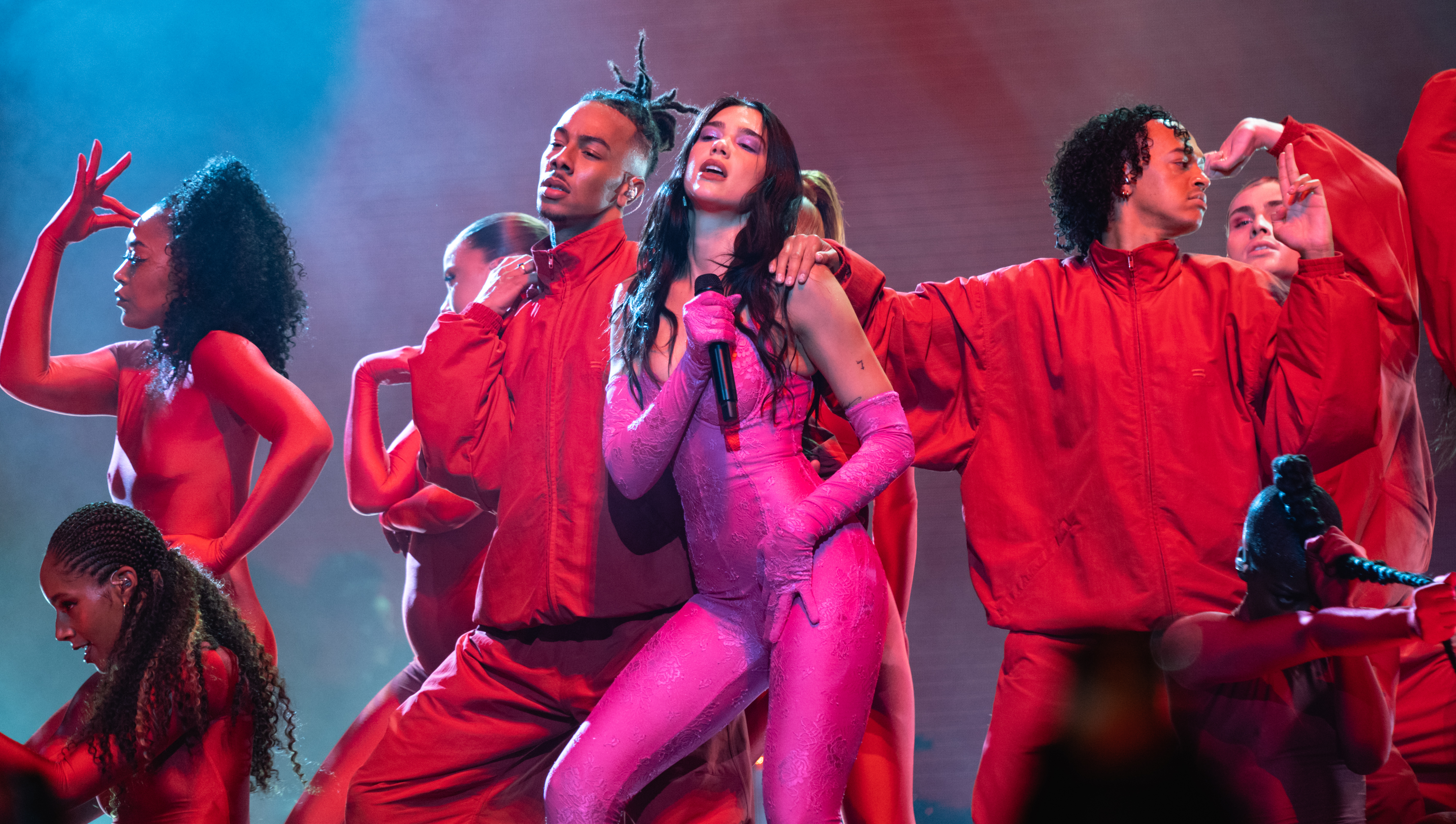
Lipa performing on the Future Nostalgia Tour in 2022

Lipa headlined the Sydney Gay and Lesbian Mardi Gras on 29 February 2020, where her set included the first live performance of "Physical". Lead single "Don't Start Now" was promoted with award show performances, including ones at the 2019 MTV Europe Music Awards, 2019 American Music Awards, and 2019 ARIA Music Awards, as well as talk show performances on The Graham Norton Show, The Ellen DeGeneres Show, and The Late Late Show with James Corden. "Break My Heart" received virtual performances on The Tonight Show Starring Jimmy Fallon, Big Brother Brasil 20, and Graduate Together: America Honors the High School Class of 2020. On 30 March 2020, "Break My Heart", "Love Again" and "Pretty Please" were performed in a live stream for Amazon Music UK. On 29 May 2020, Lipa performed "Love Again", "Pretty Please" and "Don't Start Now" in a charity livestream for the COVID-19 pandemic. She performed acoustic versions of "Break My Heart" and "Pretty Please" for the FIFA 21 world premiere. "Levitating", "Pretty Please", "Love Again", and "Don't Start Now" were performed during her NPR Tiny Desk Concert. Lipa performed "Boys Will Be Boys" at the Billboard Women in Music ceremony, where she also was honoured with the Powerhouse Award.

On 28 October 2020, Lipa announced her Studio 2054 livestream concert, in support of the album, which took place on 27 November 2020. Lipa also announced the Future Nostalgia Tour in support of the album. The tour began on 9 February 2022 in Miami, and consists of 69 announced shows. The tour was postponed from its original 2020 spring-summer date due to the COVID-19 pandemic.

=== Singles ===
"Don't Start Now" was released as the album's lead single on 31 October 2019. The song was serviced to contemporary hit radio formats in Australia, Italy, the United Kingdom, and the United States. It received acclaim from music critics, many of whom praised its disco and 1980s elements, while also noting the growth in Lipa's sound and vocals. The song was a commercial success peaking at number two on both the UK Singles Chart and the US Billboard Hot 100, with the latter becoming her first top three entry on the chart, while also being certified double platinum in both countries. It additionally entered the top 10 in over 40 other countries, while also being certified platinum or higher in over ten countries. The song's music video was directed by Nabil Elderkin and filmed in Brooklyn. It features clips of Lipa at a masquerade ball and in a crowded nightclub. Numerous remixes for "Don't Start Now" have been released, including ones by Dom Dolla, Kungs, and Regard.

"Physical" was released as the album's second single on 30 January 2020, after its title was revealed in a Spotify advertisement earlier in the month. The song was serviced to contemporary hit radio formats in the United Kingdom, Australia, and Italy. The song received positive reviews from critics, with many praising its 1980s elements. It reached number three on the UK Singles Chart, and number 60 on the US Billboard Hot 100, despite not having had an American radio release. It has been awarded a platinum certification in Canada, Spain, and the United Kingdom, while going diamond in Brazil. The music video for "Physical" was directed by Catalan production team, Canada, and filmed at Fira de Barcelona in Plaça d'Espanya, Barcelona. The visual is based on a Venn diagram by Swiss artist duo Peter Fischli and David Weiss from their series of works Order and Cleanliness (1981), and features Lipa and a group of dancers dancing in a warehouse, while incorporating anime-inspired animation. The song was further promoted with the release of a 1980s-inspired workout video, directed by Daniel Carberry, and featuring Lipa and the class members leading viewers through fitness routines. A remix of "Physical" featuring South Korean singer Hwasa of girl group Mamamoo was released on 17 March 2020.

"Break My Heart" was announced as the album's third single on Sunrise, and was released on 25 March 2020, after previously being scheduled to be released two days later. The song was serviced to contemporary hit radio formats in Australia, Italy, the United Kingdom, and the United States, becoming the album's second official single in the US, while also being serviced to adult contemporary radio formats in the latter two countries. It generated positive reviews from critics, who complimented its production. The song became Lipa's highest debut on the US Billboard Hot 100, where it debuted at 21. It eventually reached number 13 on the chart and number 6 on the UK Singles Chart. It has additionally peaked within the top 10 of 17 other countries. The Henry Scholfield-directed video was shot in Bulgaria and inspired by Pedro Almodóvar and the 1990s. It features a set of slide clips, with Lipa in many scenarios, going from vulnerable to empowered. An animated video directed by Marco Pavone was also released, featuring Lipa in search of a crystal heart and fighting off giant robots. Remixes by Jax Jones and Joris Voorn were also released.

"Hallucinate" was announced in July 2020 to be released as the album next single, officially impacting contemporary hit radio formats in the United Kingdom on 17 July 2020 as the album's fourth single. Like its predecessor, it received positive reviews for its production, while commercially reaching number 31 on the UK Singles Chart. The Lisha Tan-directed animated music video was inspired by the 1970s and Studio 54, and created during the COVID-19 pandemic, with teams of animators working in Paris, London, and Los Angeles. The visual features Lipa going on a psychedelic, hallucinatory adventure after smelling a flower. Remixes of "Hallucinate" by Paul Woolford and Tensnake have been released.

After being announced as a single in August 2020 and being promoted to radio as a promotional single, a remix of "Levitating" featuring American rapper DaBaby was released as the fifth single from Future Nostalgia on 1 October 2020. It also serves as the album's third single in the United States, impacting contemporary hit radio formats in the country five days later.

"Fever" with Belgian singer Angèle was released on 29 October 2020 as the sixth single exclusively in France and Belgium promoting the French edition of Future Nostalgia. The song peaked at number 79 on the UK Singles Charts, as well as reaching the summit of both the Ultratop Wallonia and Flanders charts of Belgium and in France. It additionally entered the top 10 of charts in Hungary and Switzerland. The song received a music video on 6 November 2020 that was directed by We are from L.A., and features Lipa and Angèle exploring the streets of London. The two promoted the single with a performance at the 2020 NRJ Music Awards.

"Love Again" was announced on 11 March 2021 to be released as the album's next single, officially impacting contemporary hit radio formats in France as the album's sixth single.

=== Promotional single ===
The title track was confirmed to be released as a promotional single in November 2019 and was officially released as the only one on 13 December 2019, being released to keep Lipa's fans engaged until 2020. It was met with mixed to positive reviews from critics, with many praising the production and lyrics, and many commenting on its experimental nature. The song became moderately successful in Europe, entering charts in Ireland, Scotland, and Spain, while reaching number 63 on the UK Singles Downloads Chart, and 11 on the NZ Hot Singles Chart. The song was accompanied by a lyric video, set in a retro 1960s house on a small lake, where Lipa dances, drinks alcohol and hits golf balls.

=== The Moonlight Edition ===
Following the release of Future Nostalgia, Lipa teased the release of tracks that did not make it to the album's standard edition, stating "I have a couple of songs that I've worked on, and that I kind of put aside for a second wind, so that's all to be discussed". Lipa further explained that she had always planned a reissue as she was very "cutthroat" when choosing the standard edition songs. In April 2020, she confirmed Future Nostalgia would receive a deluxe reissue and further teased it while serving as a guest Watch What Happens Live with Andy Cohen the following month. In July 2020, a fan commented on one of Lipa's Instagram posts asking for the release of the Future Nostalgia B-sides; Lipa replied and confirmed their release and also stated that she has "enough [music] to hold [her fans] all the way through till 2022".

Lipa described "Fever" as an introduction to the B-sides. In a YouTube chat with her fans for the release of its music video, Lipa announced that the B-sides would be released in 2021. In January 2021, Lipa further teased the B-sides release with a post on social media with the caption "B-sides are on the way". She further teased it through until the next month. On 4 February 2021, Dua officially announced the reissue day and its title, Future Nostalgia: The Moonlight Edition. The Moonlight Edition was released one week later on 11 February 2021, alongside the reissue's lead single "We're Good".

== Critical reception ==
Professional ratings
Aggregate scores
Source	Rating
AnyDecentMusic?	8.5/10
Metacritic	88/100
Review scores
Source	Rating
AllMusic	5/5 stars
The Daily Telegraph	4/5 stars
DIY	5/5 stars
Entertainment Weekly	A−
The Guardian	4/5 stars
The Independent	5/5 stars
The Line of Best Fit	9/10
NME	5/5 stars
Pitchfork	7.5/10
Rolling Stone	4/5 stars

Future Nostalgia received universal acclaim from music critics. At Metacritic, which assigns a normalised rating out of 100 to reviews from professional publications, the album has an average score of 88, based on 19 reviews. Aggregator AnyDecentMusic? gave it 8.5 out of 10, based on their assessment of the critical consensus. According to Metacritic, Future Nostalgia is the 15th most acclaimed album released in 2020.

Writing for NME, Rhian Daly wrote that "Future Nostalgia is a bright, bold collection of pop majesty to dance away your anxieties to... if only for a little while". Chris Taylor of The Line of Best Fit praised Lipa's direction for the album, saying "Future Nostalgia is an artist in total control. It's built on such an addictive carefree spirit that it's hard not to let loose and go with it. The greatest pop star of this generation? That's for you to decide. But Future Nostalgia makes a very convincing argument that Dua Lipa just might be". Chris Willman of Variety praised the album's musical direction, writing "after calling it a great disco record, we might also call Future Nostalgia a great MTV-era album that just happens to be not of the MTV era". Writing for Rolling Stone, Brittany Spanos also praised the album's musical direction, writing "Future Nostalgia is a breathtakingly fun, cohesive and ambitious attempt to find a place for disco in 2020".

Writing for DIY, Elly Watson wrote "this album has proved: Dua will be going down in pop history as one of the best". Laura Snapes of The Guardian complimented Lipa's choice of songs, writing "The 11-track Future Nostalgia offers neither features nor filler, and makes a strident case for Lipa as a pop visionary, not a vessel". Michael Cragg of Crack summarised the album as "packed with full-throttle choruses, supple melodies and lashings of attitude, Future Nostalgia is a neon-hued sound of one of the world's biggest pop stars smashing it out of the park". Similarly, Craig Jenkins of Vulture commended the "sturdy" songs, also writing that Minogue and Madonna are their "predecessors" sonically. Jenkins concluded that Lipa has "only scratched the surface of what she's capable of".

In his "Consumer Guide" column, Robert Christgau gave the album a three-star honorable mention and called it an "Olivia Newton-John tribute as dance smash as what-me-despair placebo, that deserves props for adding two keepers to that canon", namely the title track and "Good in Bed".

=== Year-end lists ===
Future Nostalgia placed in the top ten of the year-end lists of several publications, including being viewed as 2020's best album by Entertainment.ie, Gaffa, GQ, People, Slate and Vogue India.

Select year-end placements
Publication	List	Rank	Ref.
The A.V. Club	The 20 best albums of 2020	8	
Billboard	The 50 Best Albums of 2020: Staff Picks	2	
Consequence of Sound	Top 50 Albums of 2020	5	
GQ	Best albums of 2020	1	
The Guardian	The 50 best albums of 2020	2	
Metacritic	Best Music and Albums for 2020	15	
Metacritic	Best of 2020: Music Critic Top Ten Lists	5	
NME	The 50 best albums of 2020	3	
People	Top 10 Albums of 2020	1	
Pitchfork	The 50 Best Albums of 2020	21	
Rolling Stone	The 50 Best Albums of 2020	5	

== Awards and nominations ==
Year	Ceremony	Category	Result	Ref.
2020	ARIA Music Awards	Best International Artist (Future Nostalgia)	Nominated	
2020	Mercury Prize	Albums of the Year	Nominated	
2020	LOS40 Music Awards	Best International Album	Won	
2020	People's Choice Awards	The Album of 2020	Nominated	
2021	TEC Awards	Best Record Production / Album	Nominated	
2021	Grammy Awards	Album of the Year	Nominated	
2021	Grammy Awards	Best Pop Vocal Album	Won	
2021	Brit Awards	British Album of the Year	Won	
2021	American Music Awards	Favorite Pop/Rock Album	Nominated	

== Commercial performance ==
Future Nostalgia debuted at number two on the UK Albums Chart with 34,390 units, only 550 units behind 5 Seconds of Summer's Calm. In its second week, it reached the summit of the chart, with Future Nostalgia becoming Lipa's first UK number one album. The album would go on to top the chart for three more non-consecutive weeks. On 17 April 2020, it was certified Silver by the British Phonographic Industry (BPI) for selling over 60,000 units in the UK. The album holds the record for having the lowest one-week sales while at the top of the chart in the modern era, when it was number one the week beginning 15 May 2020 with sales of only 7,317. It was certified double Platinum by the BPI in 2022, having shifted over 600,000 units to date in the UK. In October 2021, the BBC's music correspondent Mark Savage noted that Future Nostalgia was the only British album released since the start of 2020 to have been certified Platinum by the BPI.

As in the UK, Future Nostalgia entered the Australian album chart at number two before rising to the top in April 2020. After charting for almost a year the album climbed back to the number one spot in March 2021. It was certified double platinum by the Australian Recording Industry Association for 140,000 equivalent units sold. Following the release of the album's Australian tour edition vinyl in April 2022, the album returned to number one for a third non-consecutive week in its 108th week on the chart.

The album topped the record charts of 14 countries, including Ireland, Finland, the Netherlands, New Zealand, Portugal, and Spain. In France, it debuted at number nine, becoming Lipa's first top ten, and reached the top five several weeks later. It remained within the top ten several times in 2021 following the release of the Moonlight Edition, the deluxe version of the album, and stayed 156 weeks. It became Lipa's longest-running album in the French Albums Chart. In 2025, it was certified Diamond by SNEP for 500,000 units sold, becoming the singer's first ever album to achieve this.

Future Nostalgia debuted at number four on the US Billboard 200 dated 11 April 2020, with 66,000 album-equivalent units, including 18,000 pure album sales. A major improvement over her self-titled debut album (which peaked at number 27), it became Lipa's first top 10 album on the chart. The following week, the album dropped to number 8, with sales declining by 43% to nearly 38,000 units. It remained within the top ten in its third week. As of December 2020, the album has sold 931,000 album-equivalent units in the United States. After the release of its reissue The Moonlight Edition in February 2021, the album surged back at number seven on the Billboard 200, reaching the top 10 for the first time in 10 months with 32,000 album-equivalent units earned, increasing by 58% compared to the previous week. On the chart dated 27 March 2021, following Lipa's performance at the 63rd Annual Grammy Awards, one year after its initial release, the album reached a peak of number three on the chart, moving 37,000 album-equivalent units that week. It finished as the ninth best-selling album of 2021 in the US, with 1.403 million album-equivalent units moved. As of May 2024, the album has moved 4.3 million album-equivalent units in the US.

According to the International Federation of the Phonographic Industry (IFPI), Future Nostalgia was the tenth most successful album of 2020 worldwide, with 3.3 million album-equivalent units sold. In 2021, the album once again made IFPI's Global Album All-Format Chart at number six.

== Impact ==
According to Billboard, as of 2022, Future Nostalgia is one of the 15 best-performing 21st-century albums without any of its singles being number-one hits on the Billboard Hot 100. According to Tom Corson, co-chairman of Warner Records, Lipa has "the benefit of being a pioneer" for being "the first major pop star to release an album in quarantine". David Levesley of GQ magazine described Future Nostalgia as "the decade's first great pop album" and explained that the album "balances stadium anthems with also being a gospel of feminine excellence for all the teens looking to her for inspiration". while Chris Willman of Variety called the album the "Reigning Dance-Pop Album of the Century", compared it to Taylor Swift's Folklore, and further wrote that both albums "barely seemed to exist in the same world, let alone genre, but they effectively captured a populace's polarized reactions to the cessation of normal life as anyone knew it". Rolling Stone described Future Nostalgia as "the disco liberation soundtrack we need" during the COVID-19 pandemic.

The Daily Beast called the album an "apocalypse game-changer" and emphasized that it will "have us dancing until the world ends". The Wall Street Journal called Lipa "one of the biggest breakout stars of lockdown" due to the critical and commercial success of the album. According to BBC News, Lipa is one of the artists who "brought the 80s back to the music industry". She was also one of the UK's most-played artists in 2020 as the album "proved to be the soundtrack to many people's quarantine, with its uplifting disco anthems providing the perfect antidote to isolation". Upon the release of Drake's Honestly, Nevermind and Beyoncé's Renaissance, both in 2022, some publications cited Future Nostalgia as the predictor of a house music revival, along with Lady Gaga's Chromatica (2020).

== Track listing ==
Standard edition
No.	Title	Writer(s)	Producer(s)	Length
1.	"Future Nostalgia"	Dua Lipa; Jeff Bhasker; Clarence Coffee Jr.	Bhasker; Skylar Mones^{[a]}	3:04
2.	"Don't Start Now"	Lipa; Caroline Ailin; Emily Warren; Ian Kirkpatrick	Kirkpatrick; Ailin^{[b]}	3:03
3.	"Cool"	Lipa; Camille Purcell; Shakka Philip; Ben Kohn; Tom Barnes; Pete Kelleher; Tove Lo	TMS; Stuart Price; Lorna Blackwood^{[c]}	3:29
4.	"Physical"	Lipa; Jason Evigan; Coffee; Sarah Hudson	Evigan; Koz; Gian Stone^{[c]}	3:13
5.	"Levitating"	Lipa; Coffee; Hudson; Stephen Kozmeniuk	Koz; Price	3:23
6.	"Pretty Please"	Lipa; Julia Michaels; Ailin; Kirkpatrick	Kirkpatrick; Juan Ariza^{[a]}	3:14
7.	"Hallucinate"	Lipa; Samuel George Lewis; Sophie Frances Cooke	SG Lewis; Price; Lauren D'elia^{[c]}	3:28
8.	"Love Again"	Lipa; Coffee; Kozmeniuk; Chelcee Grimes	Koz; Price^{[a]}; Blackwood^{[c]}	4:18
9.	"Break My Heart"	Lipa; Andrew Wotman; Ali Tamposi; Stefan Johnson; Jordan K. Johnson; Andrew Farriss; Michael Hutchence	Andrew Watt; The Monsters & Strangerz	3:41
10.	"Good in Bed"	Lipa; Michel "Lindgren" Shulz; Melanie Joy Fontana; Taylor Upsahl; David Charles Marshall Biral; Denzel Michael Akil-Baptiste	Lindgren; Take a Daytrip	3:38
11.	"Boys Will Be Boys"	Lipa; Kennedi; Justin Tranter; Evigan	Koz; Blackwood^{[c]}	2:46
Total length:				37:17

The Moonlight Edition
No.	Title	Writer(s)	Producer(s)	Length
12.	"Fever" (with Angèle)	Lipa; Kirkpatrick; Michaels; Ailin; Angèle; Jacob Kasher Hindlin	Kirkpatrick; Tristan Salvati^{[a]}^{[c]}	2:37
13.	"We're Good"	Lipa; Sylvester Willy Sivertsen; Warren; Scott Harris	Sly; Warren^{[c]}; Harris^{[c]}	2:46
14.	"Prisoner" (Miley Cyrus featuring Dua Lipa)	Cyrus; Wotman; J. Johnson; Marcus Lomax; S. Johnson; Tamposi; Jonathan Bellion; Michael Pollack; Lipa	Watt; The Monsters & Strangerz; Bellion^{[a]}	2:49
15.	"If It Ain't Me"	Lipa; Taylor Parks; Robin Oliver Frid; Uzoechi Emenike	Frid	3:15
16.	"That Kind of Woman"	Lipa; Justin Parker; Sam Dew; Coffee	Parker; Price; Blackwood^{[c]}	3:20
17.	"Not My Problem" (featuring JID)	Lipa; Coffee; Hudson; Kozmeniuk; Destin Choice Route	Koz	2:23
18.	"Levitating" (featuring DaBaby)	Lipa; Coffee; Hudson; Kozmeniuk; DaBaby	Koz; Price	3:23
19.	"Un Día (One Day)" (with J Balvin, Bad Bunny and Tainy)	Lipa; José Álvaro Osorio Balvín; Benito Antonio Martínez Ocasio; Daystar Peterson; Marco Masís; Alejandro Borrero; Ivanni Rodriguez; Coffee	Tainy	3:51
Total length:				61:40

=== Notes ===
- ^{^[a]} signifies an additional producer
- ^{^[b]} signifies an additional vocal producer
- ^{^[c]} signifies a vocal producer
- "Love Again" contains elements from "My Woman" by Bing Crosby.
- "Break My Heart" contains interpolations from "Need You Tonight" by INXS.
- "Not My Problem" features additional vocals by Vula Malinga and Ed Travers.
- The French vinyl includes the bonus track "Fever" as track 12 and the digital deluxe edition as track 13.
- The digital deluxe and the bonus edition includes the bonus track "Levitating" (featuring DaBaby) as track 12.
- The bonus edition includes a bonus remix disc which mirrors the track listing of Club Future Nostalgia (DJ Mix).

== Personnel ==
Credits adapted from the liner notes of Future Nostalgia: The Moonlight Edition.

=== Standard edition ===
Musicians

- Dua Lipa – vocals, songwriter (all tracks)
- Jeff Bhasker – drum programming (track 1)
- Emily Warren – backing vocals (track 2)
- Drew Jurecka – string arrangement, violin, viola, baritone violin, string engineer (tracks 2, 8, 11)
- Tove Lo – backing vocals (track 3)
- Tom Barnes – drums, bass (track 3)
- Pete Kelleher – synthesizer (track 3)
- Ben Kohn – guitar (track 3)
- Stuart Price – keyboards (tracks 3, 5, 7–8), drum programming (tracks 3, 5, 7), bass (tracks 3, 5, 8), guitar (track 3)
- Kamille – backing vocals (track 3)
- Shakka – backing vocals (track 3)
- Jason Evigan – drums, synthesizer (track 4)
- Koz – drums, synthesizer (tracks 4–5, 8, 11) bass (tracks 5, 8, 11), guitar (tracks 5, 8)
- Todd Clark – backing vocals (tracks 4–5, 11)
- Clarence Coffee Jr. – backing vocals (tracks 4–5, 8)
- Sarah Hudson – backing vocals (tracks 4–5)
- Paul Phamous – backing vocals (track 5)
- Russell Graham – keyboards (track 5)
- Bosko "Electrospit" Kante – talkbox (track 5)
- Homer Steinweiss – drums (track 5)
- Ian Kirkpatrick – programming (track 2), backing vocals, drum programming, guitar, keyboards (track 6)
- Julia Michaels – backing vocals (track 6)
- SG Lewis – drums, guitar, keyboards, synthesizer programming (track 7)
- Sophie Frances Cooke – backing vocals, string arrangement (track 7)
- Alma Goodman – backing vocals (track 8)
- Vanessa Luciano – backing vocals (track 8)
- Ash Soan – Tom Toms drums (track 8)
- Andrew Watt – backing vocals, guitar, keyboards, tambourine (track 9)
- The Monsters & Strangerz – keyboards (track 9)
- Chad Smith – drums (track 9)
- Lindgren – keys, drum programming (track 10)
- Denzel Baptiste – keys, programming, drum programming, bass (track 10)
- David Biral – keys, programming, drum programming (track 10)
- Take A Daytrip – programming track 10)
- Melanie Fontana – backing vocals (track 10)
- Taylor Upsahl – backing vocals (track 10)
- Kennedi – backing vocals (track 11)
- Dan Bingham – piano (track 11)
- Isabel Gracefield – piano engineering (track 11)
- Stagecoach Epsom Performing Arts Choir – backing vocals (track 11)

Technical

- Jeff Bhasker – production (track 1)
- Skylar Mones – additional production (track 1)
- Homer Steinweiss – drum kit (track 1)
- Jerry Singh – additional programming (track 1)
- Dave Cerminera – engineering (track 1)
- Jens Jungkurth – engineering (track 1)
- Josh Gudwin – mixing (tracks 1–2, 5)
- Elijah Marrett-Hitch – mix assisting (tracks 1–2, 5–6)
- Chris Gehringer – mastering (tracks 1–8, 10)
- Will Quinnell – assistant mastering (tracks 1–8, 10)
- Ian Kirkpatrick – production, engineering (tracks 2, 6), programming, vocal production (track 2)
- Caroline Ailin – additional vocal production (track 2)
- TMS – production, vocal production (track 3)
- Stuart Price – production (tracks 3, 5, 7), vocal production (track 3), mixing (track 7), additional production (track 8)
- Lorna Blackwood – programming (tracks 3–5, 8, 11), vocal production (tracks 3–4, 8, 11), additional vocal recording (track 5)
- Cameron Gower Poole – vocal engineering (tracks 3–5, 8, 11)
- Daniel Moyler – engineering (tracks 3–4)
- Mark "Spike" Stent – mixing (track 3, 9)
- Michael Freeman – assistant mixing (track 3, 9)
- Matt Wolach – assistant mixing (track 3, 9)
- Jason Evigan – production, engineering, vocal production (track 4)
- Koz – production (tracks 4–5, 8, 11), vocal production (track 5)
- Gian Stone – vocal production (tracks 4, 9), engineering (track 4–5)
- Matt Snell – assistant engineering (track 4, 8)
- Rafael "Come2Brazil" Fadal – additional engineering (track 4)
- Matty Green – mixing (track 4, 8)
- Phil Hotz – assistant engineering (track 5)
- Juan Ariza – additional production (track 6)
- SG Lewis – production (track 7)
- Lauren D'Elia – vocal production (track 7)
- Andrew Watt – production, programming (track 9)
- The Monsters & Strangerz – production, keyboards, programming (track 9)
- Paul Lamalfa – engineering (track 9)
- Dave Kutch – mastering (track 9)
- Lindgren – production, engineering, vocal production (track 10)
- Take a Daytrip – production, programming (track 10)
- DJ Swivel – mixing (track 10)
- Rupert Christie – additional production, arrangement, engineering (track 11)
- Jay Reynolds – mixing (track 11)

Design

- Hugo Comte – photography, creative direction
- Guillaume Sbalchiero – graphic and logo design
- Ali Khazaee – Typography

=== The Moonlight Edition ===
Musicians

- Dua Lipa – vocals (all tracks), backing vocals (track 14)
- Angèle – vocals (track 12)
- Tristan Salvati – keyboards, percussion (track 12)
- Sly – backing vocals, keyboards, live drums (track 13)
- Alex Worth – backing vocals (track 13)
- Scott Harris – backing vocals, guitar (track 13)
- Caroline Ailin – backing vocals (track 13)
- Tara Siegel – backing vocals (track 13)
- Zach Gurka – backing vocals (track 13)
- Andreas Lund – guitar (track 13)
- Miley Cyrus – vocals, backing vocals (track 14)
- Andrew Watt – backing vocals, bass, drums, guitar, keyboards (track 14)
- The Monsters & Strangerz – backing vocals, keyboards (track 14)
- Jonathan Bellion – backing vocals (track 14)
- Michael Pollack – backing vocals (track 14)
- Oliver "Junior" Frid – drum programming, percussion, synthesizer, keyboards, electric bass, electric guitar, backing vocals (track 15)
- Justin Parker – keyboard, bass, guitar (track 16)
- Stuart Price – keyboards, drum programming (track 16, 18), bass (track 18)
- Lorna Blackwood – backing vocals (track 16)
- Rich Cooper – drums (track 16)
- Clarence Coffee Jr. – backing vocals (track 16–18)
- JID – featured vocals (track 17)
- Koz – synthesizer, drums, guitar (track 17–18), bass (track 18)
- Sarah Hudson – backing vocals (track 17–18)
- Vula Malinga – additional vocals (track 17)
- Ed Travers – additional vocals (track 17)
- DaBaby – featured vocals (track 18)
- Paul Phamous – backing vocals (track 18)
- Todd Clark – backing vocals (track 18)
- Russell Graham – keyboards (track 18)
- Bosko "Electrospit" Kante – talkbox (track 18)
- Homer Steinweiss – drums (track 18)

Technical

- Ian Kirkpatrick – production, engineering, programming (track 12)
- Tristan Salvati – additional production, vocal production, additional programming, engineering (track 12)
- Josh Gudwin – mixing (tracks 12–13, 18–19)
- Heidi Wang – assistant mixing (tracks 12–13, 18)
- Chris Gehringer – mastering (tracks 12–13, 15–18)
- Will Quinnell – assistant mastering (tracks 12–13, 15–18)
- Sly – production, engineering, programming (track 13)
- Emily Warren – vocal production (track 13)
- Scott Harris – vocal production (track 13)
- Greg Eliason – engineering (track 13)
- Brian Cruz – assistant engineer (track 13)
- Miley Cyrus – executive production (track 14)
- Andrew Watt – production, executive production (track 14)
- The Monsters & Strangerz – production(track 14)
- Jonathan Bellion – additional production (track 14)
- Paul LaMalfa – engineering (track 14)
- Şerban Ghenea – mixing (track 14)
- John Hanes – engineering for mix (track 14)
- Randy Merrill – mastering (track 14)
- Oliver "Junior" Frid – production, engineering, programming (track 15)
- Mark "Spike" Stent – mixing (track 15)
- Dave Emery – mix assisting (track 15)
- Matt Wolach – mix assisting (track 15)
- Justin Parker – production, engineering (track 16)
- Stuart Price – production (tracks 16–18), mixing (track 16)
- Lorna Blackwood – programming (tracks 16, 18), vocal production (track 16), additional vocal recording (track 18)
- Koz – production (tracks 17–18), engineering (track 17), vocal production (track 18)
- Matt Snell – engineering (track 17–18)
- Hal Ritson – additional vocal engineering, programming (track 17)
- Richard Adlam – additional vocal engineering, programming (track 17)
- Matty Green – mixing (track 17)
- Phil Hotz – assistant engineering (track 18)
- Cameron Gower Poole – vocal engineering (track 18)
- Elijah Marrett-Hitch – assistant mixing (track 18–19)
- Tainy – production, recording (track 19)
- J Balvin – executive production (track 19)
- Colin Leonard – mastering (track 19)

Design

- Hugo Comte – photography, creative direction
- Guillaume Sbalchiero – graphic and logo design

== Charts ==
=== Weekly charts ===
Chart performance for Future Nostalgia
Chart (2020–2021)	Peak position
Argentine Albums (CAPIF)	3
Australian Albums (ARIA)	1
Austrian Albums (Ö3 Austria)	2
Belgian Albums (Ultratop Flanders)	2
Belgian Albums (Ultratop Wallonia)	5
Canadian Albums (Billboard)	2
Croatian International Albums (HDU)	1
Czech Albums (ČNS IFPI)	1
Danish Albums (Hitlisten)	4
Dutch Albums (Album Top 100)	1
Estonian Albums (Eesti Tipp-40)	1
Finnish Albums (Suomen virallinen lista)	1
French Albums (SNEP)	5
German Albums (Offizielle Top 100)	4
Greek Albums (IFPI)	6
Hungarian Albums (MAHASZ)	1
Icelandic Albums (Tónlistinn)	5
Irish Albums (Official Charts)	1
Italian Albums (FIMI)	3
Japan Hot Albums (Billboard Japan)	26
Japanese Albums (Oricon)	24
Latvian Albums (LAIPA)	1
Lithuanian Albums (AGATA)	1
New Zealand Albums (RMNZ)	1
Norwegian Albums (VG-lista)	2
Polish Albums (ZPAV)	4
Portuguese Albums (AFP)	1
Scottish Albums (Official Charts)	1
Slovak Albums (ČNS IFPI)	2
South Korean Albums (Circle)	29
Spanish Albums (PROMUSICAE)	1
Swedish Albums (Sverigetopplistan)	4
Swiss Albums (Schweizer Hitparade)	4
Swiss Albums (Romandie)	3
Taiwanese Albums (Five Music)	1
UK Albums (Official Charts)	1
Uruguayan Albums (CUD)	4
US Billboard 200	3

=== Year-end charts ===
2020 year-end chart performance for Future Nostalgia
Chart (2020)	Position
Australian Albums (ARIA)	6
Austrian Albums (Ö3 Austria)	35
Belgian Albums (Ultratop Flanders)	19
Belgian Albums (Ultratop Wallonia)	39
Canadian Albums (Billboard)	27
Croatian Albums (Foreign Top 40)	1
Czech Albums (ČNS IFPI)	9
Danish Albums (Tracklisten)	40
Dutch Albums (Album Top 100)	3
French Albums (SNEP)	34
German Albums (Offizielle Top 100)	84
Hungarian Albums (MAHASZ)	17
Icelandic Albums (Tónlistinn)	73
Irish Albums (IRMA)	5
Italian Albums (FIMI)	33
New Zealand Albums (RMNZ)	17
Norwegian Albums (VG-lista)	10
Polish Albums (ZPAV)	91
Portuguese Albums (AFP)	94
Spanish Albums (PROMUSICAE)	17
Swedish Albums (Sverigetopplistan)	21
Swiss Albums (Schweizer Hitparade)	63
UK Albums (OCC)	3
US Billboard 200	62
Worldwide Albums (IFPI Global Music Report)	10

2021 year-end chart performance for Future Nostalgia
Chart (2021)	Position
Australian Albums (ARIA)	4
Austrian Albums (Ö3 Austria)	12
Belgian Albums (Ultratop Flanders)	11
Belgian Albums (Ultratop Wallonia)	25
Canadian Albums (Billboard)	5
Croatian Albums (Foreign Top 40)	3
Danish Albums (Hitlisten)	9
Dutch Albums (Album Top 100)	5
French Albums (SNEP)	12
German Albums (Offizielle Top 100)	51
Hungarian Albums (MAHASZ)	29
Icelandic Albums (Tónlistinn)	25
Irish Albums (IRMA)	4
Italian Albums (FIMI)	24
New Zealand Albums (RMNZ)	7
Norwegian Albums (VG-lista)	6
Portuguese Albums (AFP)	34
Spanish Albums (PROMUSICAE)	3
Swedish Albums (Sverigetopplistan)	25
Swiss Albums (Schweizer Hitparade)	25
UK Albums (OCC)	6
US Billboard 200	9
Worldwide Albums (IFPI Global Music Report)	6

2022 year-end chart performance for Future Nostalgia
Chart (2022)	Position
Australian Albums (ARIA)	8
Austrian Albums (Ö3 Austria)	21
Belgian Albums (Ultratop Flanders)	24
Belgian Albums (Ultratop Wallonia)	38
Canadian Albums (Billboard)	15
Danish Albums (Hitlisten)	35
Dutch Albums (Album Top 100)	13
French Albums (SNEP)	33
German Albums (Offizielle Top 100)	56
Italian Albums (FIMI)	55
Lithuanian Albums (AGATA)	4
Norwegian Albums (VG-lista)	18
New Zealand Albums (RMNZ)	11
Portuguese Albums (AFP)	54
Spanish Albums (PROMUSICAE)	17
Swiss Albums (Schweizer Hitparade)	38
UK Albums (OCC)	32
US Billboard 200	34

2023 year-end chart performance for Future Nostalgia
Chart (2023)	Position
Australian Albums (ARIA)	35
Belgian Albums (Ultratop Flanders)	60
Belgian Albums (Ultratop Wallonia)	57
Canadian Albums (Billboard)	34
Danish Albums (Hitlisten)	92
Dutch Albums (Album Top 100)	46
Hungarian Albums (MAHASZ)	46
New Zealand Albums (RMNZ)	30
Swiss Albums (Schweizer Hitparade)	62
UK Albums (OCC)	67
US Billboard 200	69

2024 year-end chart performance for Future Nostalgia
Chart (2024)	Position
Australian Albums (ARIA)	58
Belgian Albums (Ultratop Flanders)	63
Belgian Albums (Ultratop Wallonia)	60
Dutch Albums (Album Top 100)	76
Hungarian Albums (MAHASZ)	51
Portuguese Albums (AFP)	55
Swiss Albums (Schweizer Hitparade)	63
UK Albums (OCC)	90
US Billboard 200	126

Year-end chart performance
Chart (2025)	Position
Australian Albums (ARIA)	75
Belgian Albums (Ultratop Flanders)	62
Belgian Albums (Ultratop Wallonia)	82
Dutch Albums (Album Top 100)	86
Hungarian Albums (MAHASZ)	58
Swiss Albums (Schweizer Hitparade)	81
US Billboard 200	199

== Certifications and sales ==
Certifications and sales for Future Nostalgia
Region	Certification	Certified units/sales
Australia (ARIA) 5th Anniversary Edition	2× Platinum	140,000^{‡}
Austria (IFPI Austria)	2× Platinum	30,000^{‡}
Belgium (BRMA)	Platinum	20,000^{‡}
Brazil (Pro-Música Brasil)	2× Diamond	320,000^{‡}
Canada (Music Canada)	6× Platinum	480,000^{‡}
Denmark (IFPI Danmark)	3× Platinum	60,000^{‡}
France (SNEP)	Diamond	500,000^{‡}
Germany (BVMI)	Platinum	200,000^{‡}
Hungary (MAHASZ)	Gold	2,000^{‡}
Italy (FIMI)	3× Platinum	150,000^{‡}
Mexico (AMPROFON)	Diamond+2× Platinum+Gold	450,000^{‡}
Netherlands (NVPI)	2× Platinum	80,000^{‡}
New Zealand (RMNZ)	6× Platinum	90,000^{‡}
Norway (IFPI Norway)	3× Platinum	60,000^{‡}
Poland (ZPAV)	4× Platinum	80,000^{‡}
Portugal (AFP)	Platinum	15,000^{^}
Spain (Promusicae)	2× Platinum	80,000^{‡}
United Kingdom (BPI)	3× Platinum	900,000^{‡}
United States (RIAA)	Platinum	1,000,000^{‡}
^{^} Shipments figures based on certification alone.^{‡} Sales+streaming figures based on certification alone.

== Release history ==
Release dates and formats for Future Nostalgia
Region	Date	Format(s)	Edition	Label	Ref.
Various	27 March 2020	CD; cassette; digital download; LP; streaming	Standard	Warner	
Japan	3 April 2020	CD	Japanese standard	Warner	
Various	1 October 2020	Digital download; streaming	Digital reissue 1	Warner	
Various	29 October 2020	Digital download; streaming	Digital reissue 2	Warner	
France	20 November 2020	CD	French	Warner	
Various	27 November 2020	CD; digital download; streaming	Bonus	Warner	
Japan	27 November 2020	CD	Japanese bonus	Warner	
France	4 December 2020	LP	French	Warner	
Various	11 February 2021	Digital download; streaming	Moonlight	Warner	
Various	26 March 2021	CD; LP	Moonlight	Warner	
Various	28 March 2025	LP	5th anniversary	Warner	

== See also ==
- 1980s nostalgia
- List of UK Albums Chart number ones of the 2020s
- List of UK Album Downloads Chart number ones of the 2020s
- List of number-one albums of 2020 (Scotland)
- List of number-one albums of 2020 (Ireland)
- List of number-one albums of 2020 (Australia)
- List of number-one albums from the 2020s (New Zealand)
- List of number-one albums of the 2020s (Czech Republic)
- List of number-one albums of 2020 (Finland)
- List of number-one albums of 2021 (Australia)
- List of number-one albums of 2021 (Spain)
- List of number-one albums of 2021 (Portugal)
- List of number-one albums of 2022 (Australia)
