= Future Nostalgia (song) =

2019 promotional single by Dua Lipa

Promotional single by Dua Lipa

from the album Future Nostalgia
- B-side: "Don't Start Now"
- Released: 13 December 2019
- Studio: TaP (London); Green Oak (Los Angeles); Diamond Mine (Los Angeles)
- Genre: Synth-pop
- Length: 3:04
- Label: Warner
- Songwriters: Dua Lipa; Jeff Bhasker; Clarence Coffee Jr.
- Producers: Jeff Bhasker; Skylar Mones

Lyric video
- "Future Nostalgia" on YouTube

"Future Nostalgia" is a song by English singer Dua Lipa from her second studio album of the same name (2020), included as the album's opening track. The song was written by Lipa, Clarence Coffee Jr. and its producer Jeff Bhasker. Intended to be "playful and fun," it is a synth-pop song that contains elements of disco, funk, hip pop, house and 1980s music. The lyrics discuss themes of feminism and self-reflection with Lipa referring to herself as a "female alpha".

"Future Nostalgia" was released for digital download and streaming on 13 December 2019 through Warner Records as the album's promotional single. An accompanying lyric video premiered on YouTube three days later, and it features Lipa dancing and using a golf club in a retro house. A remix of the song by Joe Goddard appears on Lipa and the Blessed Madonna's remix album, Club Future Nostalgia (2020). Lipa promoted the song with a performance at her Studio 2054 livestream concert.

Several music critics complimented the throwback yet futuristic sound and experimental nature of "Future Nostalgia". Some also found Lipa's confident attitude and the song's sassy lyrics appealing. The song placed on year-end lists published by the Official Charts Company, Popjustice and Vulture. It entered official charts in Australia, Croatia, Greece, Hungary, Ireland, Lithuania, Portugal, Scotland, Slovakia and Spain, while also charting on component charts in New Zealand and the United Kingdom.

== Writing and production ==
"Future Nostalgia" was written by Dua Lipa, alongside Clarence Coffee Jr. and the song's producer Jeff Bhasker. They worked on the song in Los Angeles. Before writing it, Lipa and Bhasker had been experimenting in the studio for a few days to get a feel of how they wanted to work together and for Lipa to play Bhasker some of the music she had been working on. The two had not collaborated previously, although Lipa was a fan of Bhasker due to his previous work with other artists. While leaving the studio one day, Lipa accidentally texted Bhasker complimenting him and writing that she wanted to do some sessions together, thinking she was texting her manager. When they went back into the studio together, Lipa and Bhasker began talking about architecture and being overly confident, as well as having a laugh over their text conversation.

After discussing writing a song together, Lipa told Bhasker the name of her album, Future Nostalgia. Bhasker then suggested them attempting to write a title track. Lipa wanted to create something bold, so Bhasker began playing his instruments with very experimental sounds and she began writing down lyrics. After they had written half of "Future Nostalgia", the two of them got writer's block, which lead to Lipa calling Clarence Coffee Jr to help them. They wanted it to be "playful and fun" and not taking themselves too seriously. That day the three of them came up with the line "I know you ain't used to a female alpha." Lipa explained that she did not necessarily consider herself to be a "female alpha" but thought that if she put it in to writing, she could almost manifest that energy. "Future Nostalgia" was the first song written for Future Nostalgia. It was recorded at Green Oak Studios and the Diamond Mine, both in Los Angeles, with the vocals being recorded at TaP Studio in London. Mixing was handled by Josh Gudwin at Henson Studios in Hollywood and the mastering was done by Chris Gehringer at Sterling Sound in Edgewater, New Jersey.

== Music and lyrics ==
"Future Nostalgia"
A synth-pop song set to a modern electronic production, "Future Nostalgia" features Lipa singing about changing the game and having her sights much higher than perceive.

Musically, "Future Nostalgia" is a synth-pop song with disco, funk, hip pop, house and 1980s elements. It is composed in 4/4 time in the key of A minor, with a tempo of 116 beats per minute. The track has a structure of verse, chorus, bridge, verse, chorus, post-chorus, middle eight, chorus. The verses use solely the D5 chord, while the track follows a Dm–C–G/B–C/G chord progression everywhere else. "Future Nostalgia" has a modern electronic production, consisting of 1980s-funk and grunge bass-popping, electroclash synths, tinkering keys, a jazz piano progression, 1980s disco beats and brass instrumentation.

The song opens with vintage synth plinks and drum machines, while the middle eight features rhythm guitar. Lipa's vocals span from C_{4} to D_{5}, and she makes use of cocky spoken word and talk-rapped verses as well as purring falsetto in the chorus. The track features vocodered backing vocals, courtesy of Bhasker, where he repeats the title of the song. In the song, Lipa name-drops American architect John Lautner as well as Bhasker. The Lautner name drop is a symbol for Lipa's desire to make her music sound futuristic and retro at the same time. Described by Lipa as a "feeling of empowerment and sassiness," the song's lyrics deal with the themes of feminism and self-reflection. Lipa sets a confident tone and uses self-assured lyrics. It is a mission-statement song and a "mantra for getting shit done", in which she calls herself a "female alpha" and showcases her self-worth. She has her eyes set on changing the game and shows that she has her sights much higher than just re-creating the radio enormity of her 2017 single "New Rules".

== Release and promotion ==
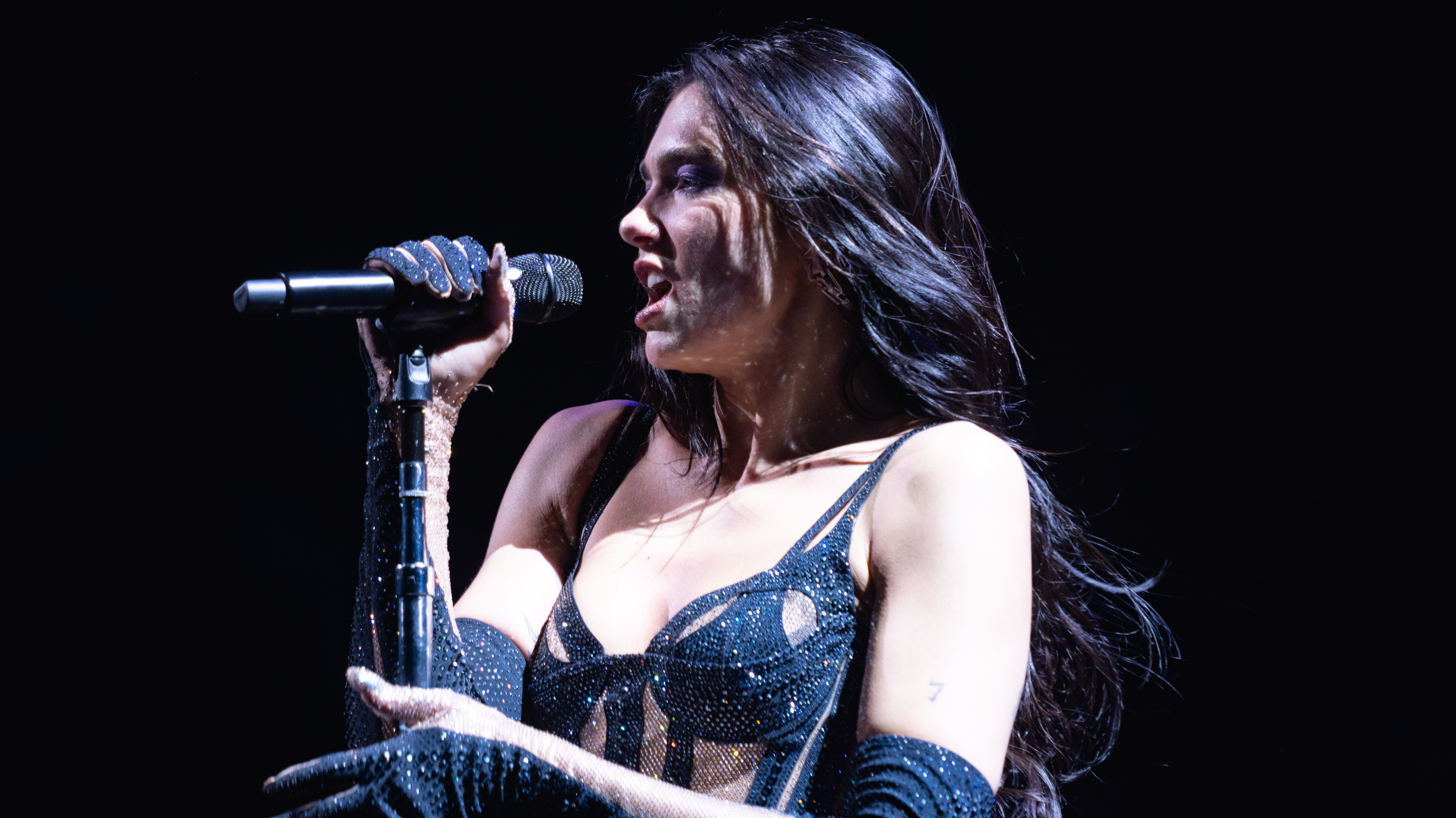
Lipa performing "Future Nostalgia" on the Future Nostalgia Tour in 2022

In November 2019, Lipa released "Don't Start Now", the lead single from her second studio album Future Nostalgia. Whilst promoting the song, Lipa confirmed the release of the title track, as well as confirming its music video release and promotional single status. "Future Nostalgia" was then formally announced on 12 December 2019. It was released for digital download and streaming the following day as the first and only promotional single from Future Nostalgia. Simultaneously, its Spotify single was released featuring "Don't Start Now" as its B-side. The song was released in conjunction with the announcement of Lipa's Future Nostalgia Tour and in order to keep Lipa's fans engaged until 2020. An accompanying lyric video was released that premiered through YouTube on 16 December 2019. It is set in a retro 1960s house that is on a small lake. In the video, Lipa dances and drinks alcohol around the house, wearing a white shirt and underwear, as well as hitting wine glasses with a golf club on the roof. She is also seen wearing a pantsuit and dancing in front of a mirror.

"Future Nostalgia" was included as the first track on Future Nostalgia, released on 27 March 2020. Lipa decided on placing the song as the opening track due to its fearlessness. A remix by Joe Goddard appears on Lipa and the Blessed Madonna's DJ Mix-crafted remix album, Club Future Nostalgia, released 28 August 2020, with the original remix being released on 11 September 2020. The remix makes use of Hot Chip-style synths and Daft Punk-inspired whirrs, that is reminiscent of a 3am Glastonbury DJ set. Lipa performed "Future Nostalgia" for the first time at her Studio 2054 livestream concert on 27 November 2020. She performed on an elevated platform, flexing her biceps as her backup dancers cheered around her. The song was included on the setlist of Lipa's Future Nostalgia Tour in the encore.

== Critical reception ==
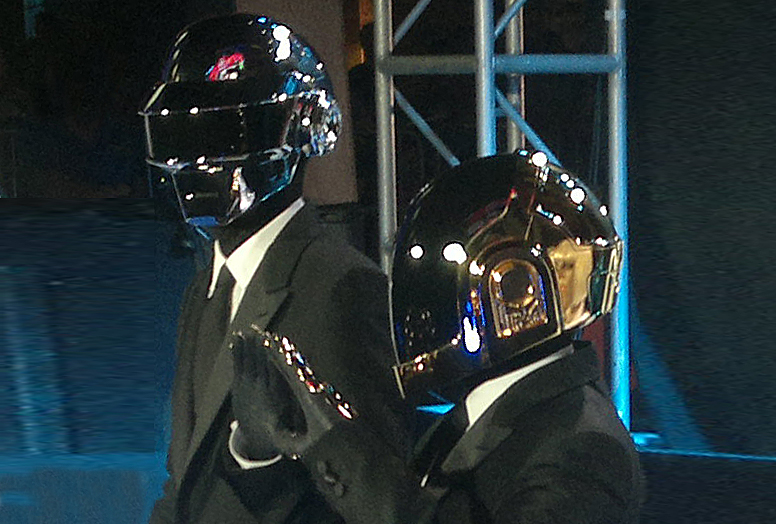

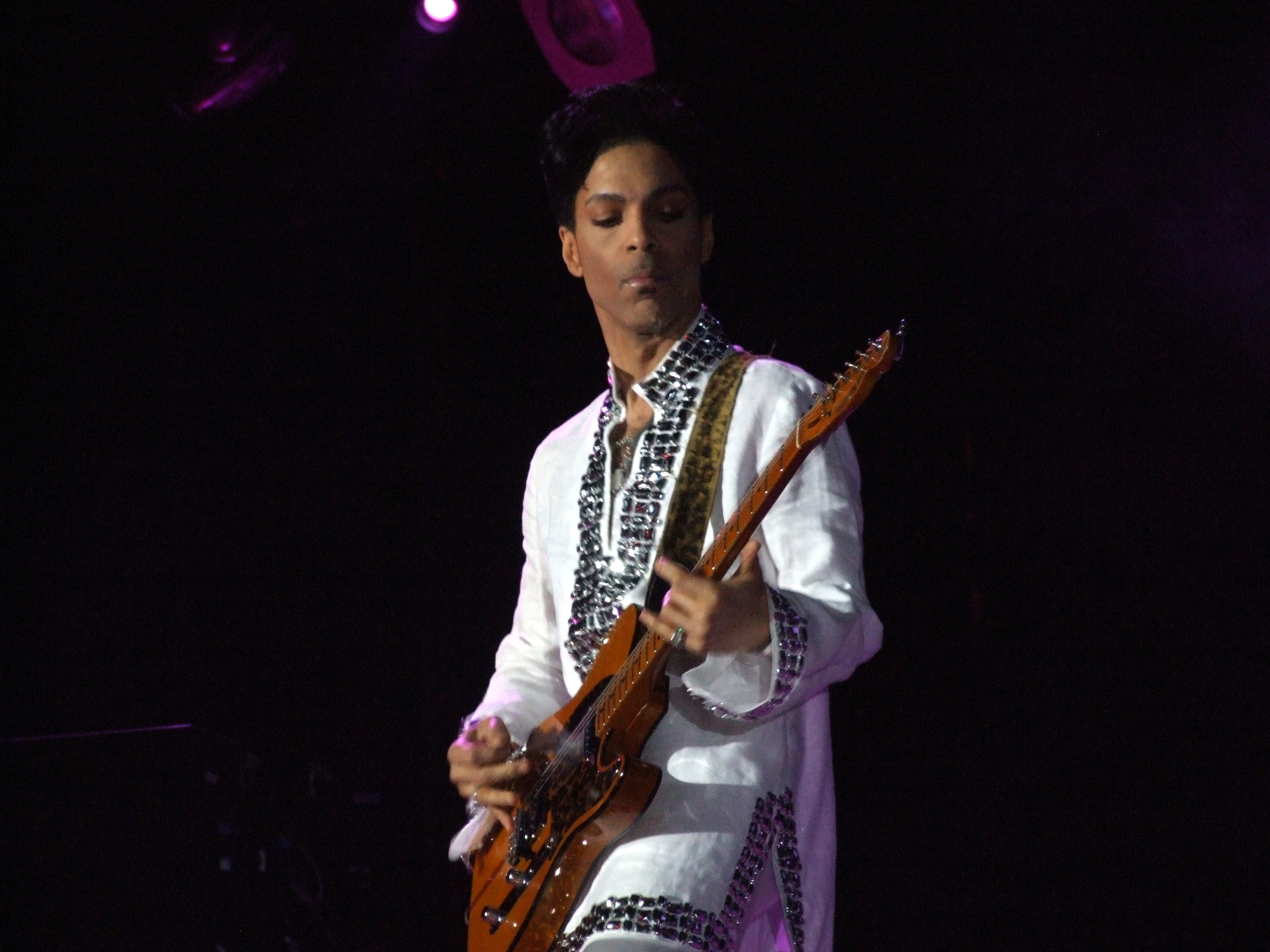
Several critics noticed similarities between "Future Nostalgia" and the works of French music duo Daft Punk and American musician Prince.

"Future Nostalgia" received widespread acclaim by music critics. Trey Alston from MTV gave the song a positive review, stating that it is "the perfect balance of the past and what lies ahead". He continued, describing the song as "completely bonkers yet irresistible" and an "explosive splash of tomorrow-pop". Writing for Idolator, Mike Nied described the production as "funky and forward-thinking" and commended the song as a whole for being a "creative risk". Allison Stubblebine of Nylon wrote that Lipa "is ensuring the dance party will rage on". Robin Murray of Clash called the song "bold" and "colourful" as well as writing "there's an 80s bounce in its synth nostalgia, channelling amid the glitz of Los Angeles". In The Guardian, Laura Snapes called Lipa's John Lautner name-drop too "arcane" for a pop song. Louise Bruton of The Irish Times called the song "intentionally disjointed". In Gigwise, Jordan Emery complimented the "cheeky" and "slightly off-kilter" lyricism.

Nick Malone for PopMatters wrote a positive review, saying Lipa "masters a tricky balancing act between sassy and irritating on its talk-rapped verses," and that she "comes off stylish and light-hearted." For Business Insider, Courteney Larocca called the song "danceable," "electric", and "retro", while Callie Ahlgrim, also of Business Insider, stated that it is a "strong album opener". Ahlgrim went on to state that the song "definitely doesn't work as a single" but it is "a bold statement of purpose" and "a sharp combination of cheeky, challenging, and confident". Billboard's Bianca Gracie viewed "Future Nostalgia" as "a flirty wink [...] that reflects the singer's confident nature". Jason Lipshutz of the same magazine thought that it probably would not be successful at top 40 radio and praised Lipa's "penchant for leveling up her vocals into a top-notch hook". Writers of both DIY and Variety compared it to Prince.

Writing for Slant Magazine, Sal Cinquemani criticized "Future Nostalgia", writing that Lipa "falls flat" with her vocals, but praised the song's production. For Rolling Stone, Emily Zemler called the song "buoyant" and "catchy" as well as stating that Lipa is "playing up her strengths." In a separate Rolling Stone review, Brittany Spanos wrote that the song has "nonsensical but smartly delivered one-liners" and compared it to the music of Daft Punk. Neil Z. Yeung of AllMusic compared the song to the works of Timbaland, while Stereogum editor Tom Breihan compared it sonically to Random Access Memories (2013) by Daft Punk and Justin Timberlake's FutureSex/LoveSounds (2006). In MusicOMH, Nick Smith compared it to "Daydream in Blue" by I Monster as well as Daft Punk. Writing for British GQ, David Levesley described it as "if Prince wrote for the Pointer Sisters".

Popjustice ranked "Future Nostalgia" as the 20th best song of 2019 while Rob Copsey of the Official Charts Company placed it as one of 2020's most underrated songs. The song appeared on Vulture's "Best Dance and Disco Songs of 2020" list written by editor Justin Curto, with him praising Lipa's "confident commitment" to the disco style and calling the song "polished and convincing".

== Commercial performance ==
After its release, "Future Nostalgia" reached number 11 on the NZ Hot Singles chart and 63 on the UK Singles Downloads Chart, as well as peaking at number 35, 83, and 58 on the Hungary Single Top 100, Irish Singles Chart, and Scottish Singles Chart respectively. After the release of Future Nostalgia, the song debuted at number 69 on the UK Official Audio Streaming Chart, while entering official charts in Australia at number 99, Croatia at number 80, Greece at number 96, Lithuania at number 46, Portugal at number 104, Slovakia at number 95, and Spain at number 99. As of July 2024, "Future Nostalgia" has been certified silver in the United Kingdom. In 2021, the song was awarded a gold certification from the Polish Society of the Phonographic Industry (ZPAV) for selling 25,000 track-equivalent units in Poland. It was awarded the same certification in Canada from Music Canada for 40,000 track-equivalent unit sales.

== Track listings ==
- Digital download and streaming
1. "Future Nostalgia" – 3:04
- Streaming – Spotify single
1. "Future Nostalgia" – 3:04
2. "Don't Start Now" – 3:03
- Digital download and streaming – Joe Goddard remix
1. "Future Nostalgia" (Joe Goddard remix) – 4:48

== Personnel ==
- Dua Lipa – vocals
- Jeff Bhasker – production, drum programming, keyboards, synthesizer
- Skylar Mones – additional production
- Homer Steinweiss – drum kit
- Jerry Singh – additional programming
- Dave Cerminera – engineering
- Jens Jungkurth – engineering
- Josh Gudwin – mixing
- Elijah Marrett-Hitch – mix assisting
- Chris Gehringer – mastering
- Will Quinnell – assistant mastering

== Charts ==
Chart performance for "Future Nostalgia"
Chart (2019–2020)	Peak position
Australia (ARIA)	99
Croatia (HRT)	80
Greece (IFPI)	96
Hungary (Single Top 40)	35
Ireland (IRMA)	83
Lithuania (AGATA)	46
New Zealand Hot Singles (Recorded Music NZ)	11
Portugal (AFP)	104
Scottish Singles Sales (Official Charts)	58
Slovakia Singles Digital (ČNS IFPI)	95
Spain (Promusicae)	99
UK Singles Downloads (Official Charts)	63
UK Audio Streaming (Official Charts)	69

== Certifications ==
Certifications and sales for "Future Nostalgia"
Region	Certification	Certified units/sales
Brazil (Pro-Música Brasil)	Platinum	40,000^{‡}
Canada (Music Canada)	Gold	40,000^{‡}
Poland (ZPAV)	Gold	25,000^{‡}
United Kingdom (BPI)	Silver	200,000^{‡}
United States (RIAA)	Gold	500,000^{‡}
^{‡} Sales+streaming figures based on certification alone.

== Release history ==
Release dates and formats for "Future Nostalgia"
Region	Date	Format(s)	Version	Label	Ref.
Various	13 December 2019	Digital download; streaming	Original	Warner	
Various	11 September 2020	Digital download; streaming	Joe Goddard remix	Warner	
