= An Evening with Dua Lipa =

2024 musical television special

- Promotional poster for special
- Directed by: Paul Dugdale
- Starring: Dua Lipa
- Country of origin: United Kingdom
- Original language: English

Production
- Executive producers: Peter Abbott; Dua Lipa; Dukagjin Lipa; Ben Winston; Sally Wood
- Production location: Royal Albert Hall
- Camera setup: Multi-camera
- Production companies: Fulwell 73; Radical22

Original release
- Network: ITV1
- Release: 8 December 2024

An Evening with Dua Lipa is a television special by English singer Dua Lipa. The programme aired on British broadcast network ITV1 on 8 December 2024. Consisting of solo performances and a duet with British singer Elton John, it was part of the promotion for Lipa's third studio album Radical Optimism (2024). The special was recorded on 17 October 2024 at the Royal Albert Hall in London, England.

The programme also aired on American broadcast network CBS and simulcast through streaming service Paramount+, on 15 December 2024. Lipa was accompanied onstage by a 53-piece orchestra and musicians related to the singer, most notably the Heritage Orchestra. Before the programme's broadcast, Lipa released an accompanying live album on 6 December 2024 through Warner Records.

== Development ==
English singer and songwriter Dua Lipa unveiled her third studio album, titled Radical Optimism (2024), throughout social media on 13 March 2024. The project is inspired by Lipa's hometown, London, for its "confidence and freedom of 90s Britpop". The concept was introduced by a close friend, with Lipa capturing "essence of youth and freedom" so she can incorporate in her recording sessions. Afterwards, the singer announced her third concert tour in support of the album on 18 March.

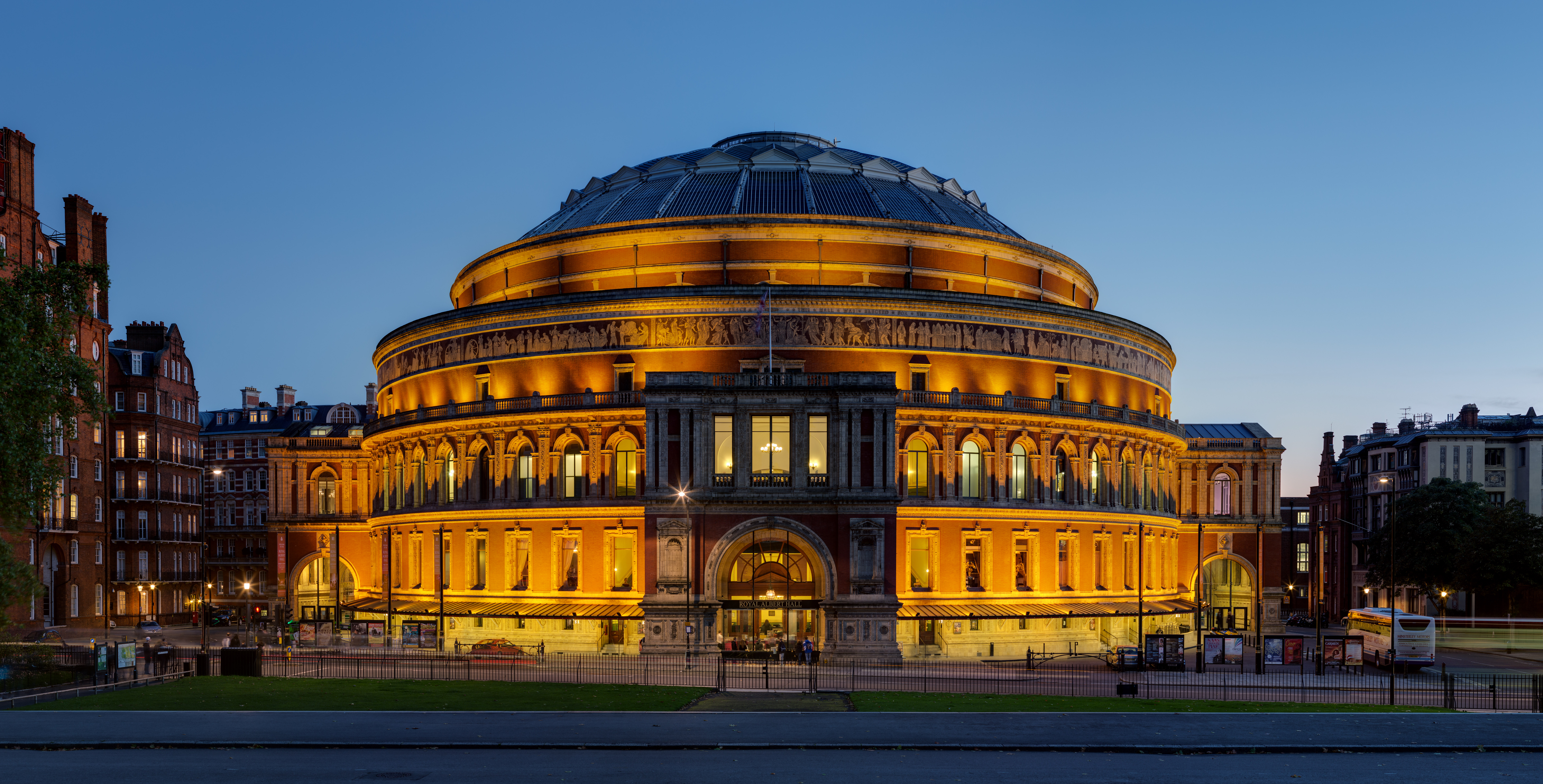
The television special was held at the Royal Albert Hall in London.

Lipa uploaded a promotional poster on Instagram where she would perform a one-off show located at the Royal Albert Hall in her hometown. Fans who pre-ordered the album were granted pre-sale access on 10 April, followed by the general ticket sale two days later, via Ticketmaster. Tickets were limited to two per booking with prices varying from £55–£86. A month later, the neo-psychedelia record was released on 3 May 2024, spawning favourable reviews from music critics.

The concert took place on 17 October 2024, and Lipa was accompanied on stage with the Heritage Orchestra conducted by British composer Ben Foster, her seven-piece band, and fourteen choristers. Media outlets reported the show was filmed and set to be released the same year. Television networks CBS Entertainment and ITV confirmed in a press release on 23 October that the artist would star in a television special titled An Evening with Dua Lipa.

== Synopsis ==
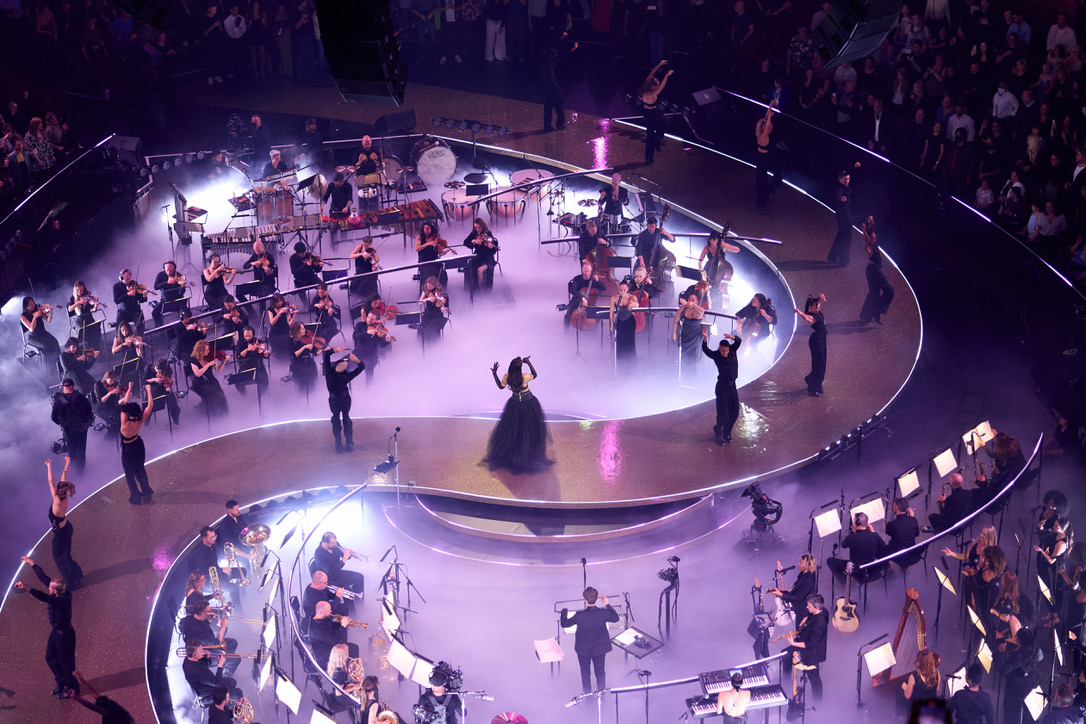
Lipa performing alongside the Heritage Orchestra

The special starts with the view of an S–shaped catwalk, surrounded by the 53-piece orchestra conducted by Ben Foster. The camera frequently cut to Lipa walking through backstage from the Royal Albert Hall. She appeared onstage debuting her black hair, dressed in a "satin" red dress layered in crimson tulle. Lipa opened her show with a performance of "Houdini" (2023). Ending the performance, the programme cuts to an interview with Lipa, including footage of herself and the orchestra rehearsing. She frequently interacted with the audience, such as viewing the attendees' outfits and reaction, she then had herself and the backing vocalists perform "Levitating" (2020) and "Maria" (2024). Resuming the interview, Lipa was reminiscing by viewing footage from her younger self singing and credited her childhood music teacher named Ray; they both reunited after not seeing each other for ten years. "Anything for Love" (2024) was performed in a soft piano rendition.

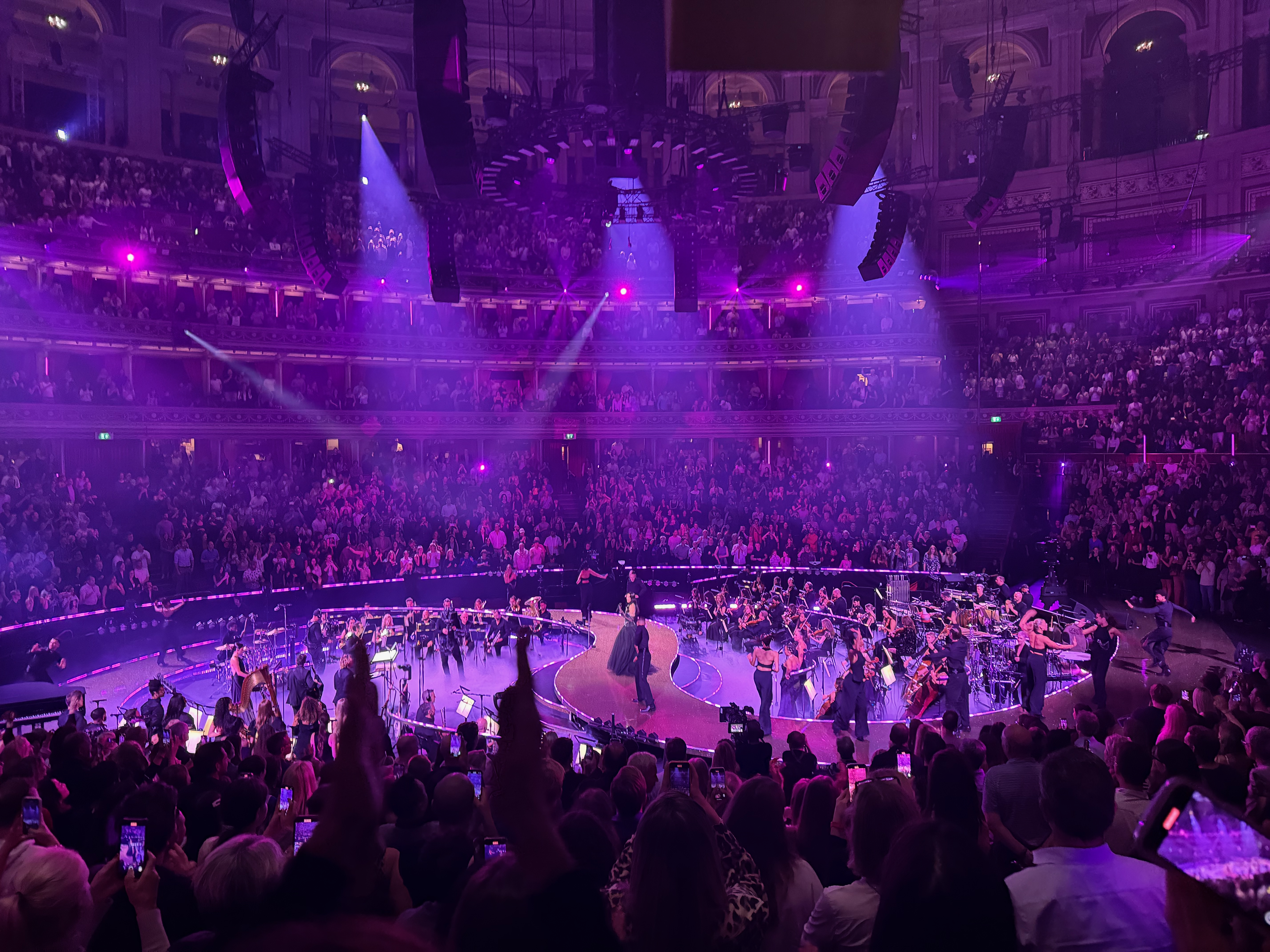
A panoramic view of Lipa's performance

The singer discussed her close relationship with British singer Elton John, where they both first performed together at his annual AIDS foundation party livestreamed in April 2021. John remembered calling Lipa for a remix collaboration, in which was an immediate yes. In the special, Lipa reappeared onstage wearing an embroidered "gothic" gown layered with black lace. As she began performing chart-topping song "Cold Heart" (2021), she welcomed John to the stage and both sang a selected duet. After John was escorted off the stage, Lipa sang "Happy for You" (2024) and asked the audience to clap their hands, meanwhile she ran through the stage.

Lipa and her siblings Gjin and Rina wandered through department store Liberty looking for Christmas decoration, and explained how the holidays brings families together during a time of need. Continuing the programme, Lipa ended the performance with a medley between "Dance the Night" (2023) and "Don't Start Now" (2019), as white confetti falls she thanked the audience and orchestra in joining with her.

The CBS version contains additional performances of "These Walls", "Love Again", and "Illusion". It also has footage filmed at locations in New York City.

== Fashion ==
Throughout the programme, Lipa presented an ensemble look consisting of two customised outfits. When she first appeared onstage, the singer wore a recreated Jean Paul Gaultier corseted cherry–red dress, layered in crimson tulle, with a dramatic slit, and paired with burgundy opera gloves. Her second outfit is a custom monochrome Chanel gown composed of embroidered pearls featuring a signature camellia embellishments. Lipa credited American fashion designer and stylist Jahleel Weaver for curating both gowns.

== Live album ==
Dua Lipa Live from the Royal Albert Hall

Live album by Dua Lipa
- Released: 6 December 2024
- Recorded: 17 October 2024
- Venue: Royal Albert Hall
- Length: 81:30
- Label: Warner
- Producers: Charles Monneraud; William Bowerman

Dua Lipa chronology
Radical Optimism (2024)	Dua Lipa Live from the Royal Albert Hall (2024)	Dua Lipa – Live from Mexico (2026)

Lipa revealed in November 2024 that the concert special was recorded for her first live album, including a sole guest appearance from Elton John. The album, titled Dua Lipa Live from the Royal Albert Hall, was released on 6 December through Warner Records. In a four-star review, Neil Z. Yeung of AllMusic praised Lipa's vocals as well as the arrangement of the songs, comparing them to the work of Mark Ronson.

Professional ratings
Review scores
Source	Rating
AllMusic	4/5 stars
Stereoboard	4/5 stars

=== Track listing ===
No.	Title	Writer(s)	Length
1.	"Overture"	Samuel Read; Ben Foster; Charles Monneraud; William Bowerman	1:46
2.	"End of an Era"	Dua Lipa; Kevin Parker; Danny L Harle; Caroline Ailin; Tobias Jesso Jr.	3:59
3.	"Houdini"	Lipa; Parker; Harle; Ailin; Jesso	3:56
4.	"Training Season"	Lipa; Parker; Harle; Ailin; Jesso; Nick Gale; Martina Sorbara; Shaun Frank; Yaakov Gruzman; Steve Mastroianni	3:40
5.	"These Walls"	Lipa; Andrew Wyatt; Harle; Billy Walsh; Ailin	3:50
6.	"Whatcha Doing"	Lipa; Parker; Harle; Ailin; Jesso; Ali Tamposi	3:58
7.	"French Exit"	Lipa; Parker; Harle; Ailin; Jesso	3:45
8.	"Illusion"	Lipa; Parker; Harle; Ailin; Jesso	3:57
9.	"Falling Forever"	Lipa; Ian Kirkpatrick; Harle; Emily Warren; Tamposi; Ailin	4:00
10.	"Anything for Love"	Lipa; Kirkpatrick; Harle; Jesso; Julia Michaels; Ailin	3:09
11.	"Maria"	Lipa; Wyatt; Harle; Ailin; Michaels	3:45
12.	"Happy for You"	Lipa; Parker; Harle; Ailin; Jesso	4:23
13.	"Love Again"	Lipa; Bing Crosby; Chelcee Grimes; Stephen Kozmeniuk; Irving Wallman; Clarence Coffee; Max Wartell	6:02
14.	"Pretty Please"	Lipa; Michaels; Kirkpatrick; Ailin	3:25
15.	"Levitating"	Lipa; Coffee; Sarah Hudson; Jason Evigan	4:24
16.	"Sunshine"	Cleopatra Nikolic; Dean Cover	4:42
17.	"Cold Heart" (with Elton John)	Elton John; Bernard Taupin; Andrew Meecham; Dean Meredith; Samuel Littlemore; Nicholas Littlemore; Peter Mayes	5:28
18.	"Be the One"	Gale; Jack Tarrant; Lucy Taylor	4:49
19.	"Dance the Night"	Lipa; Ailin; Wyatt; Mark Ronson	4:07
20.	"Don't Start Now"	Lipa; Ailin; Kirkpatrick; Warren	4:25
Total length:			81:30

=== Charts ===
Chart performance for Dua Lipa Live from the Royal Albert Hall
Chart (2024–2025)	Peak position
Belgian Albums (Ultratop Flanders)	5
Belgian Albums (Ultratop Wallonia)	25
Croatian International Albums (HDU)	1
Dutch Albums (Album Top 100)	58
French Albums (SNEP)	46
Hungarian Albums (MAHASZ)	18
Polish Albums (ZPAV)	68
Portuguese Albums (AFP)	21
Scottish Albums (Official Charts)	22
Spanish Albums (PROMUSICAE)	31
Swiss Albums (Schweizer Hitparade)	41
UK Albums (Official Charts)	40
US Top Album Sales (Billboard)	15

=== Release history ===
List of release dates, editions, and formats
Region	Date	Format(s)	Label	Ref.
Various	6 December 2024	CD; digital download; streaming	Warner	
Various	13 December 2024	Vinyl	Warner	

== Reception ==
An Evening with Dua Lipa
Review scores
Source	Rating
The Guardian	3/5 stars
The Independent	4/5 stars

The Guardian gave an average 3/5. "It's impressive in scale and ambition, her voice is strong enough not to be swamped by the instrumentation, and there's absolutely no reason why her brand of dance-pop shouldn't work laden with strings and brass".

The Independent rated it a score of 4/5. "The effect is palpable long before the English-Albanian disco-pop sensation sets foot on stage at London's Royal Albert Hall, which has been transformed into a lavish in-the-round arena for the night".

The CBS broadcast was watched by 2.88 million viewers.

== See also ==
- Studio 2054 – a livestream concert in support of Lipa's second studio album Future Nostalgia (2020).
