= List of songs recorded by Dua Lipa =

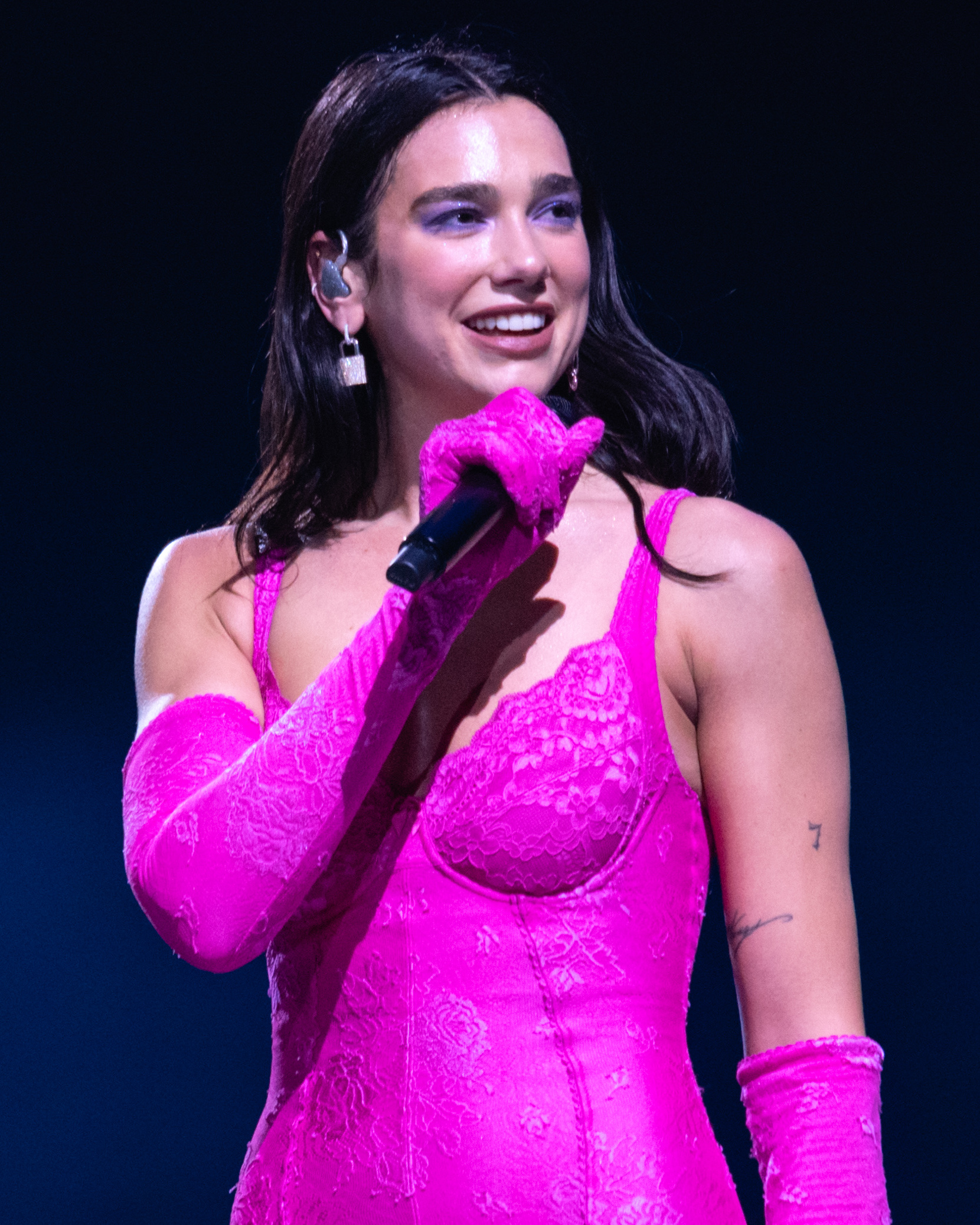
Dua Lipa performing in May 2022 for her Future Nostalgia Tour at the O2 Arena in London

English singer Dua Lipa began her music career in 2014, signing a record deal with Warner Bros. Records. The following year, she released her debut single "New Love", followed by her eponymous debut studio album two years later. Prior to the album's release, she released three extended plays (EP), Spotify Sessions (2016) Be the One (EP) (2016) and The Only (2017) . Of the 25 songs included on all editions of Dua Lipa, Lipa co-wrote 21. The album encompassed dance-pop, electropop and R&B genres. Many of the songs were produced by Stephen Kozmeniuk, however she worked a variety of songwriters and producers including Coldplay frontman Chris Martin, who co-wrote "Homesick", and Digital Farm Animals, who produced "Be the One". Collaborations on the record include "Lost in Your Light" featuring Miguel, "Kiss and Make Up" with Blackpink, "One Kiss" with Calvin Harris, "Electricity" with Silk City, previously Collaborations "Scared to Be Lonely" with Martin Garrix (2017) and "No Lie" by Sean Paul featuring Lipa. (2016) The singer released the EPs Live Acoustic (2017), which featured cover versions of songs by other artists, and Deezer Sessions (2019). She also recorded "Swan Song" for the 2019 film Alita: Battle Angel, and "High", a collaboration with Whethan, for the Fifty Shades Freed soundtrack. In 2017 and 2020, Lipa featured on charity singles "Bridge over Troubled Water" and "Times Like These" as part of the Artists for Grenfell and Radio One Allstars, respectively.

Lipa's second studio album Future Nostalgia was released in March 2020, preceded by the singles, "Don't Start Now", "Physical" and "Break My Heart". The album marked a change in sound for the singer encompassing a 1980s and Studio 54-influenced disco and pop sound, opting for more live instrumentation. Lipa co-wrote every song on the record and collaborated with many of the same songwriters and producers as on her first album, as well as new ones including Tove Lo, who co-wrote "Cool", and Julia Michaels who co wrote "Pretty Please" as well as Lipa's collaboration with Angèle, "Fever". To accompany the record, she released a remix album with the Blessed Madonna titled Club Future Nostalgia, that featured a remix of "Levitating" featuring Madonna and Missy Elliott as well as a remix of "Physical" featuring Gwen Stefani. The project also included "Prisoner" by Miley Cyrus featuring Lipa, "Not My Problem" featuring JID, a remix of "Levitating" featuring DaBaby and "Un Día (One Day)" with J Balvin, Bad Bunny and Tainy.

== Songs ==
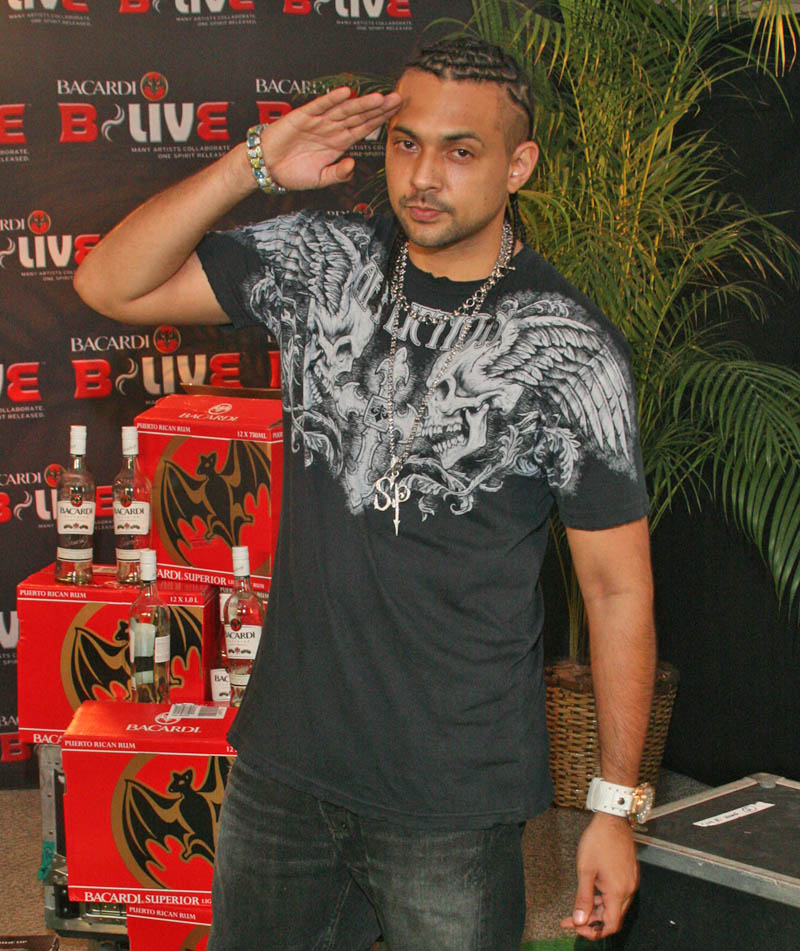
Lipa is featured on Sean Paul's "No Lie".

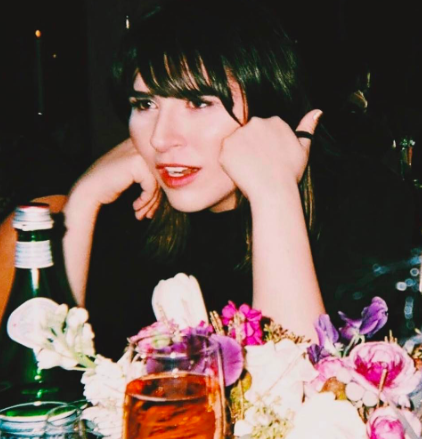
Emily Warren has co-written four of Lipa's songs "No Lie", "New Rules", "Don't Start Now", "We're Good".

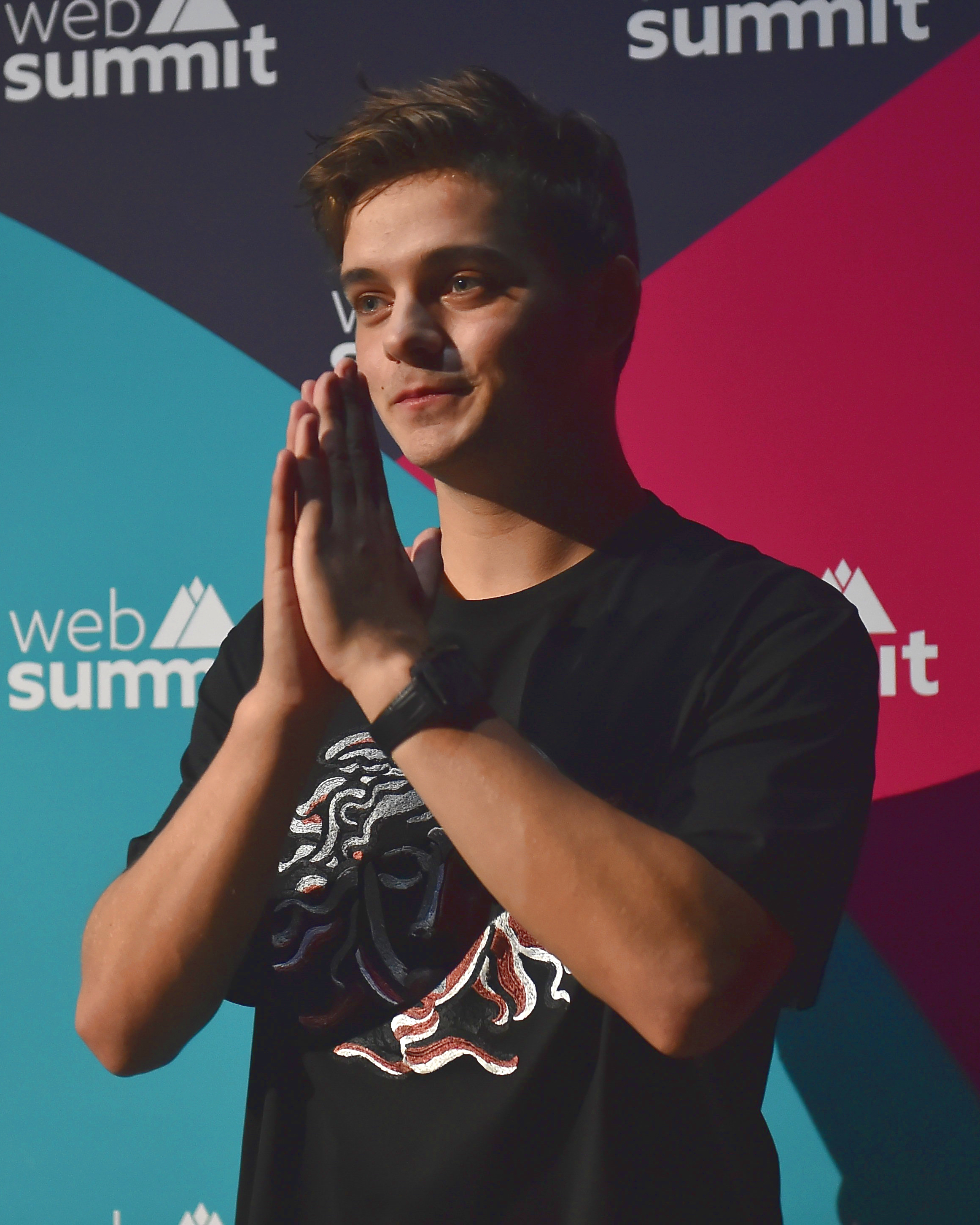
Lipa and Martin Garrix collaborated on "Scared to Be Lonely".

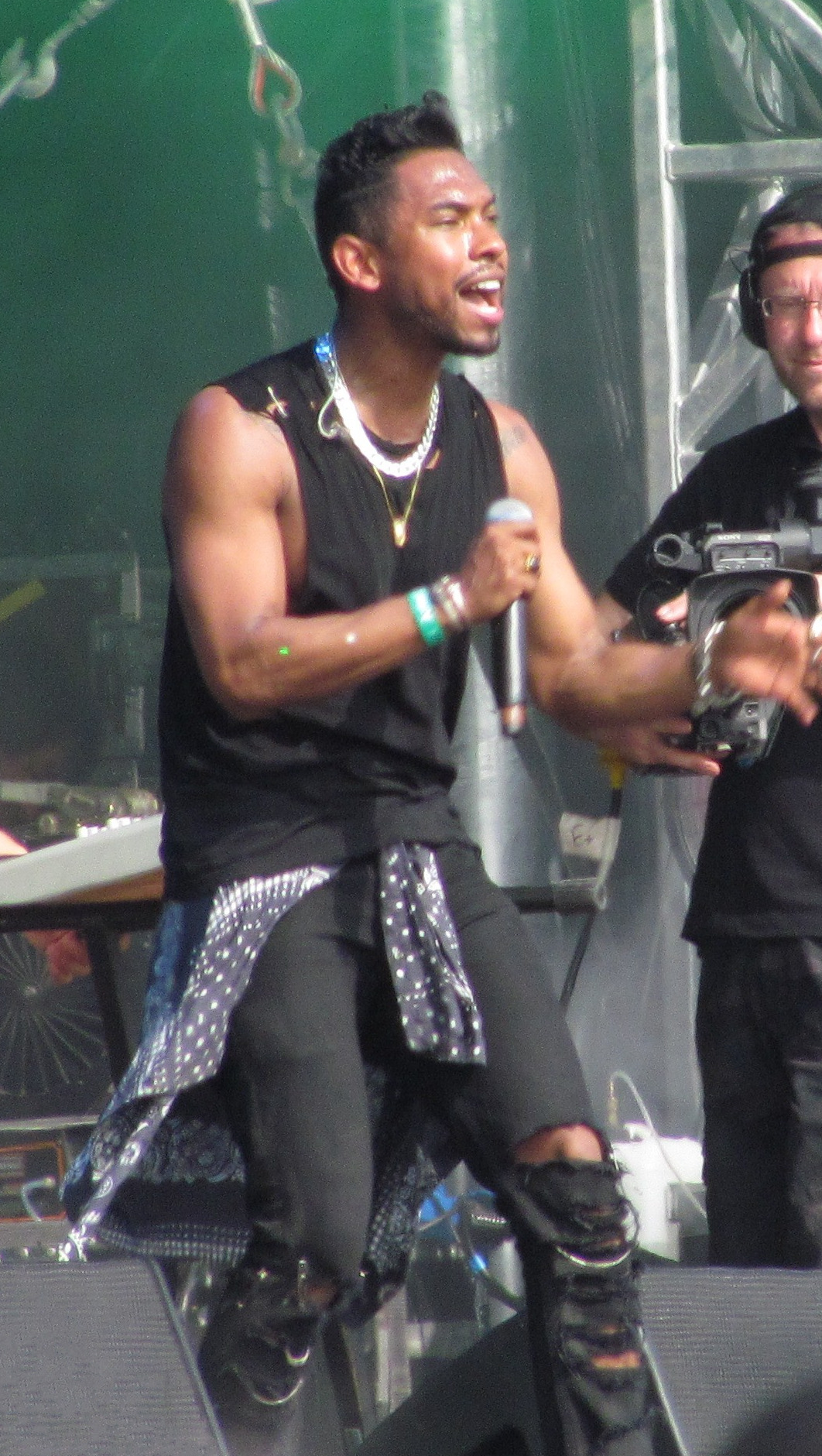
Miguel appeared as a featured artist on "Lost in Your Light".

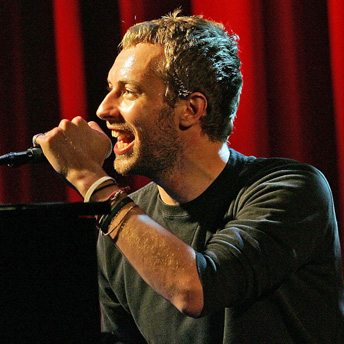
Coldplay frontman Chris Martin co-wrote "Homesick".

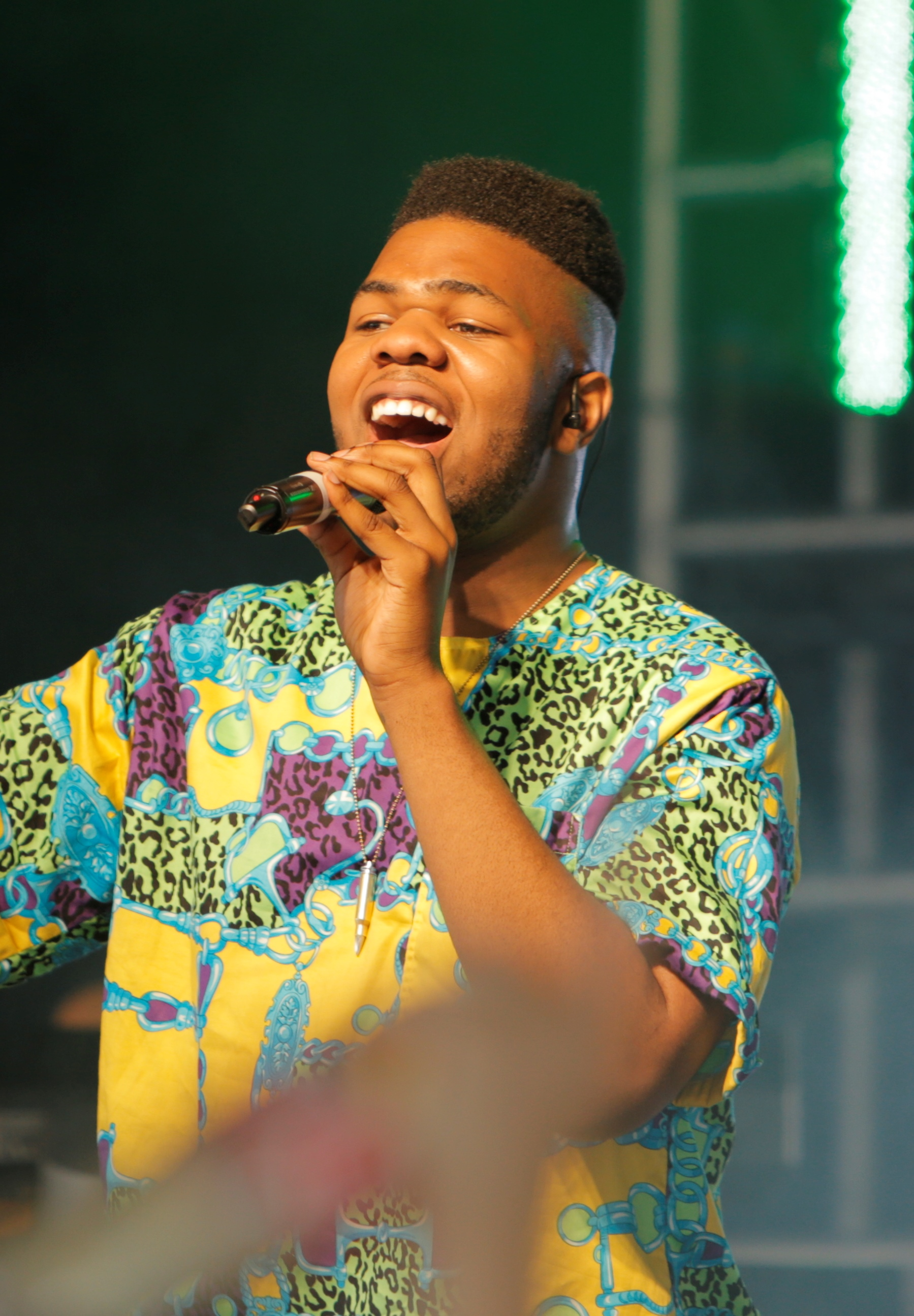
MNEK co-wrote and provided additional backing vocals on "IDGAF" and "If It Ain't Me".

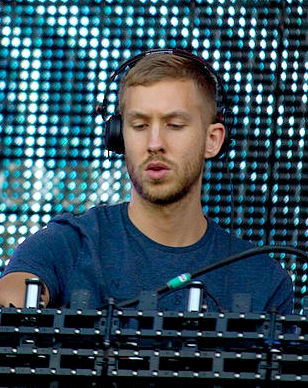
Lipa collaborated with Calvin Harris on "One Kiss" and "Potion".

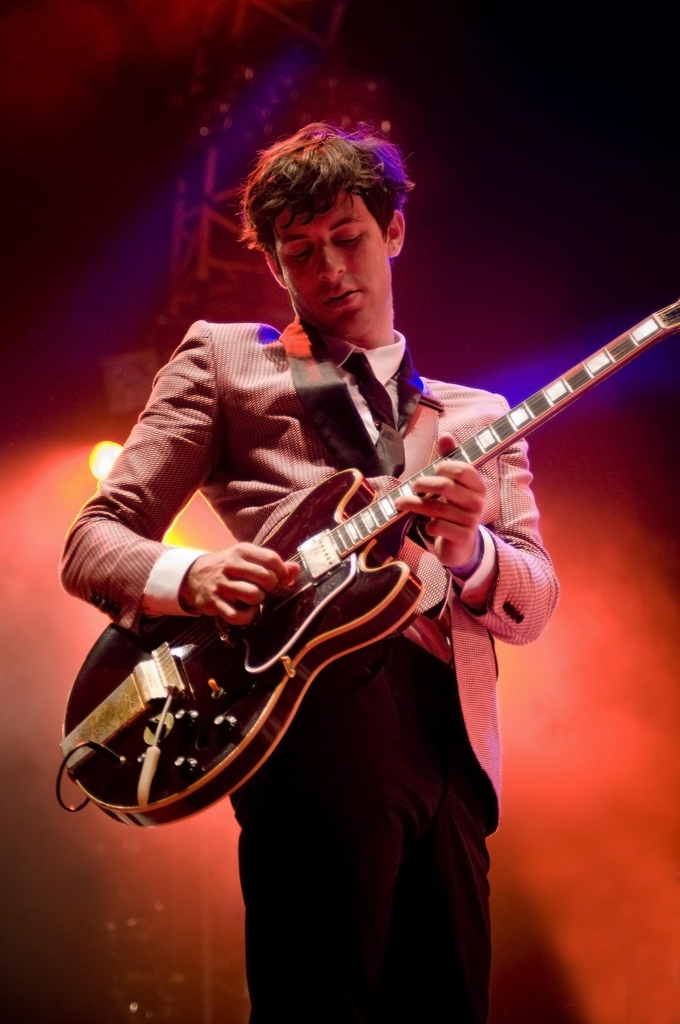
Lipa and Mark Ronson collaborated on "Electricity" and Ronson also created a remix of Lipa's "Physical".

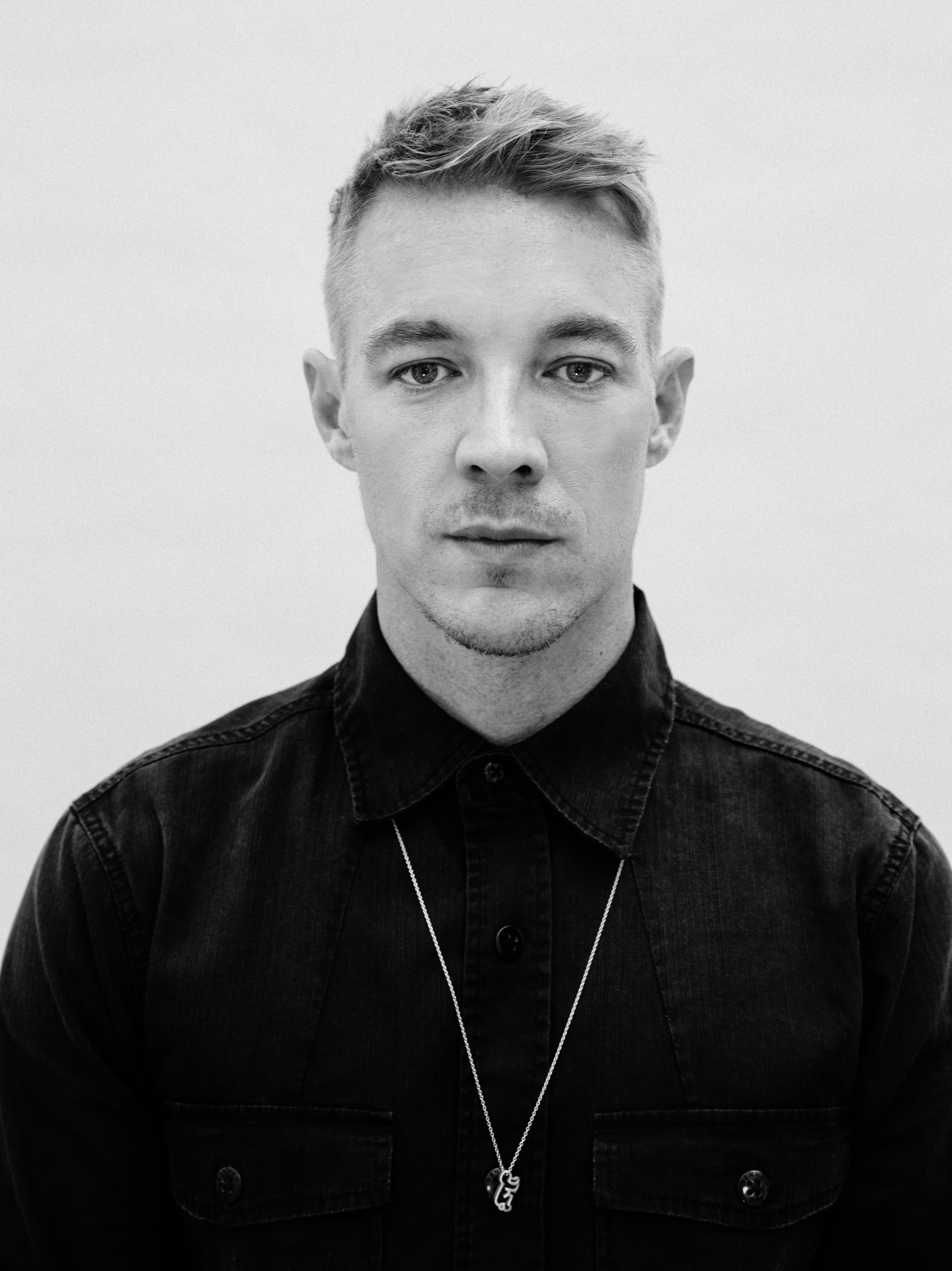
Lipa and Diplo collaborated on "Electricity"

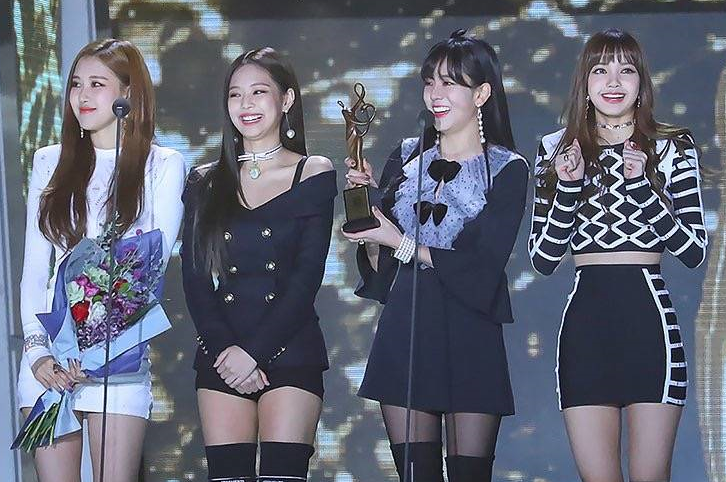
Lipa collaborated with South Korean girl group Blackpink on "Kiss and Make Up" as well as Blackpink member Jennie on "Handlebars".

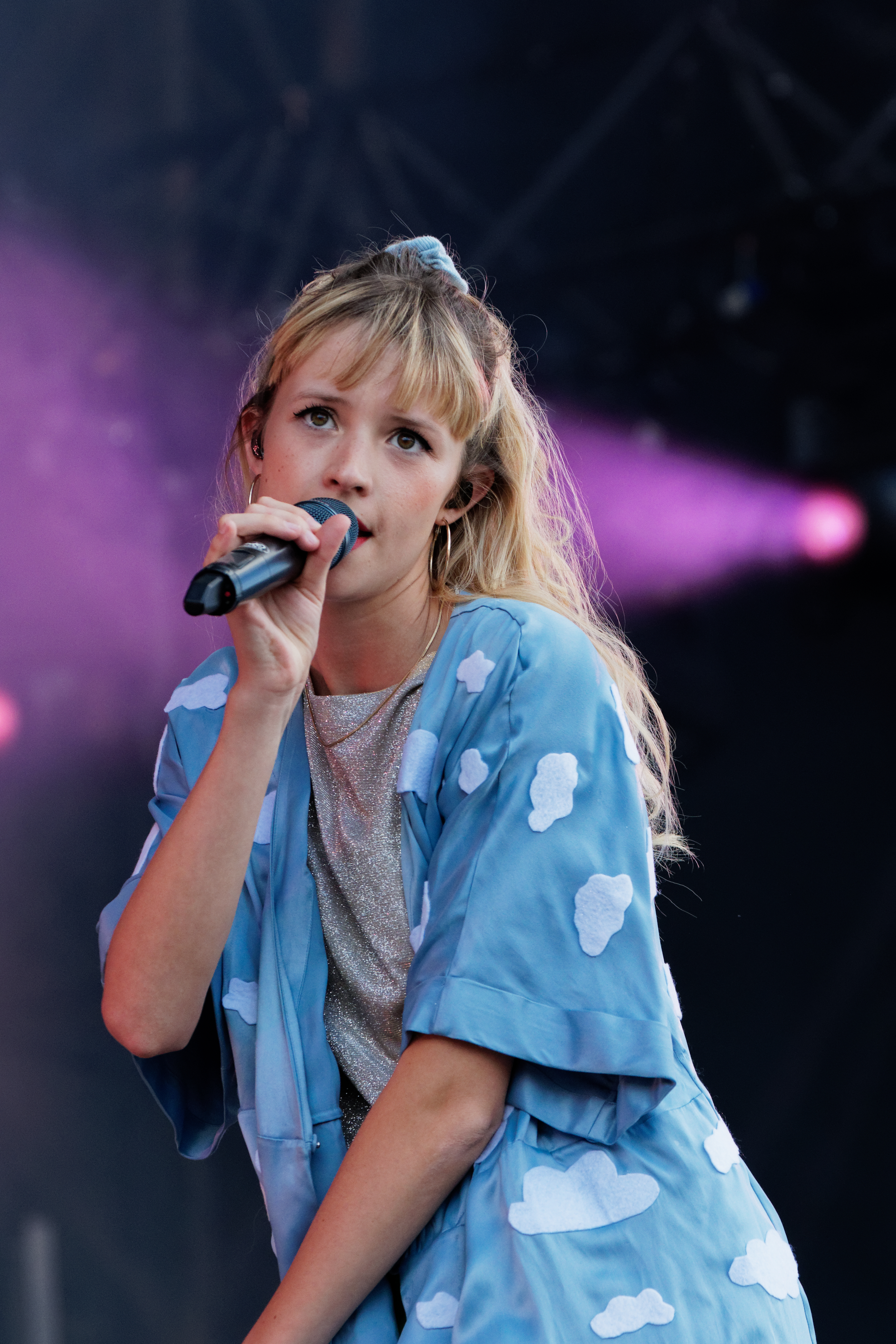
Lipa and Angèle perform the duet "Fever" together.

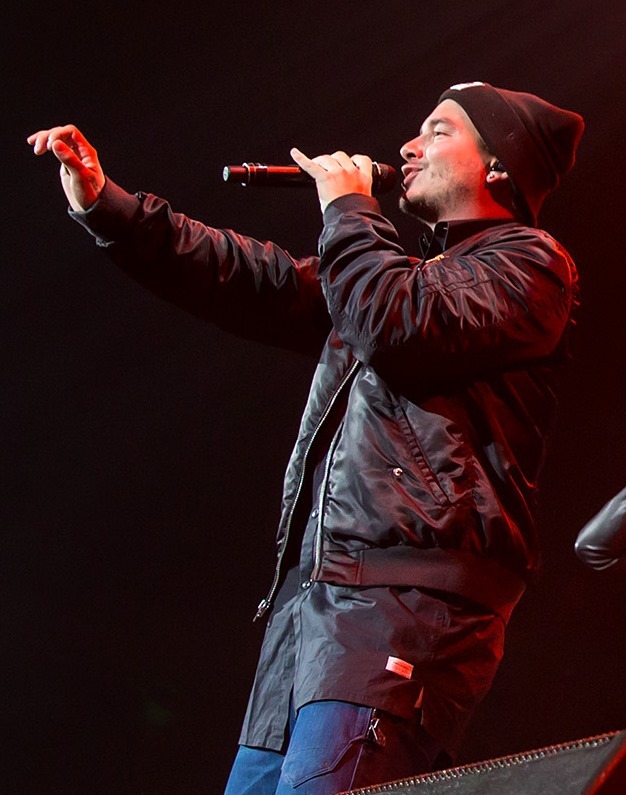
Lipa and J Balvin collaborated on "Un Día (One Day)".

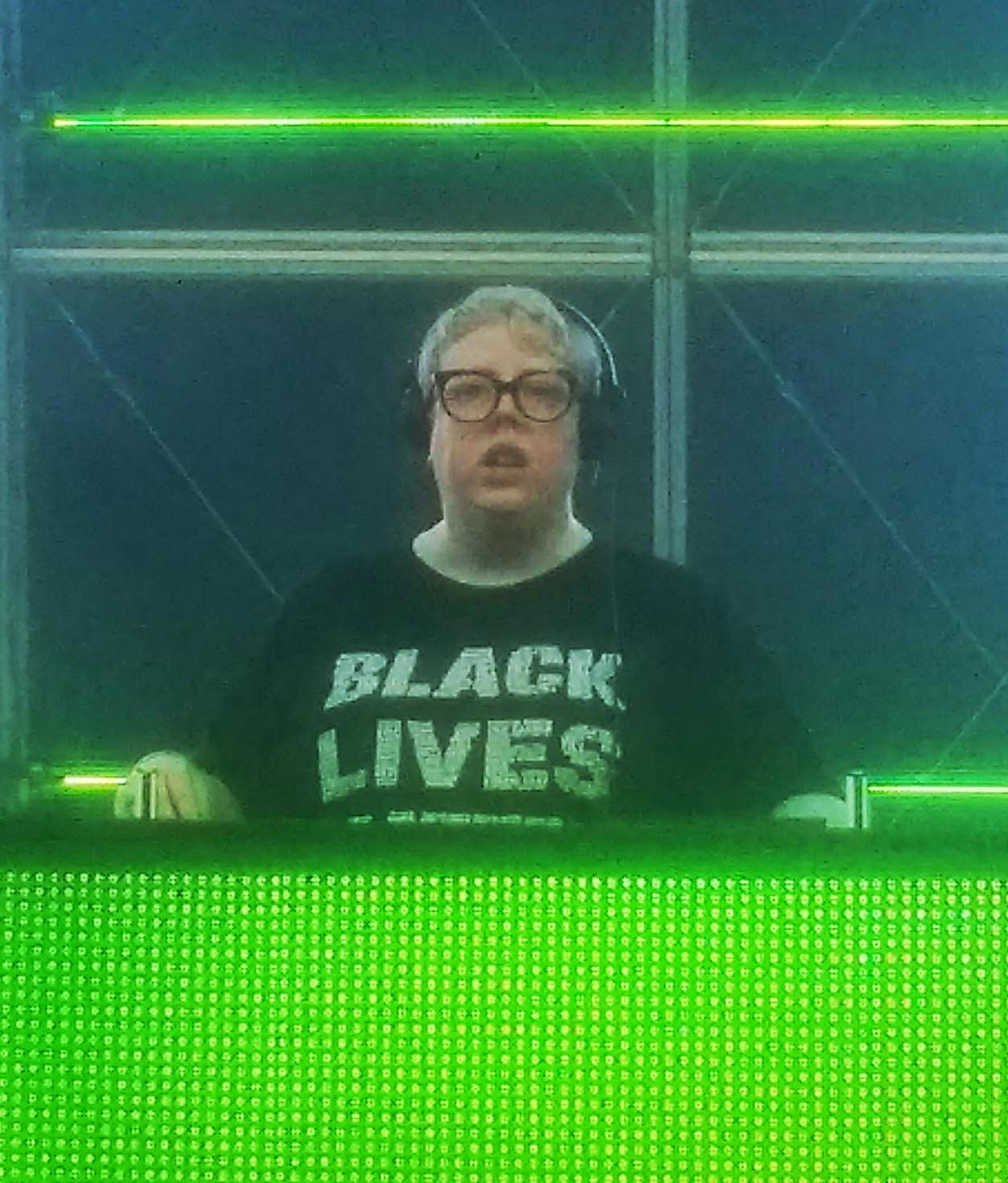
Lipa collaborated with the Blessed Madonna on Club Future Nostalgia.

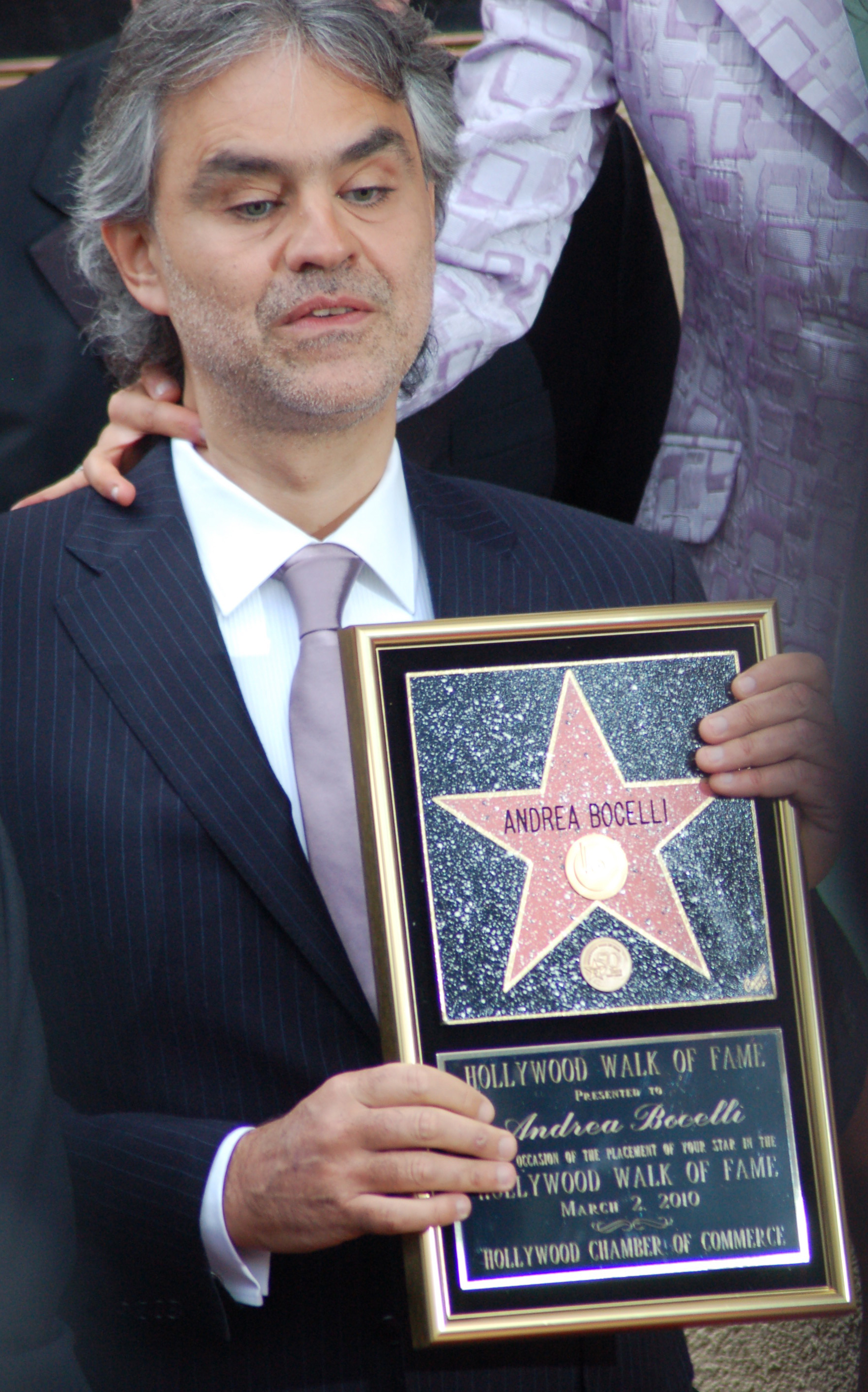
Andrea Bocelli featured Lipa on "If Only".

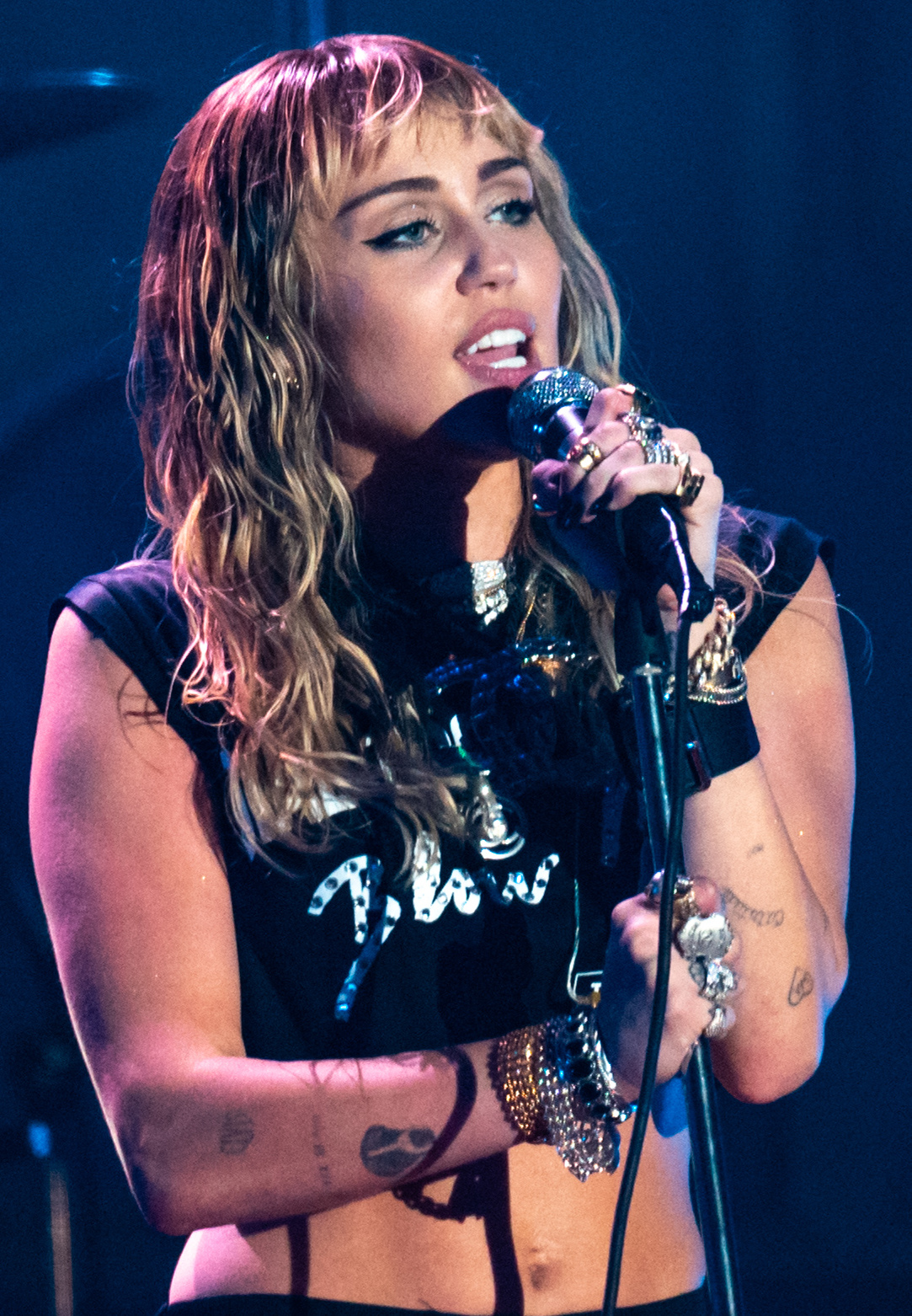
Lipa is featured on Miley Cyrus' "Prisoner".

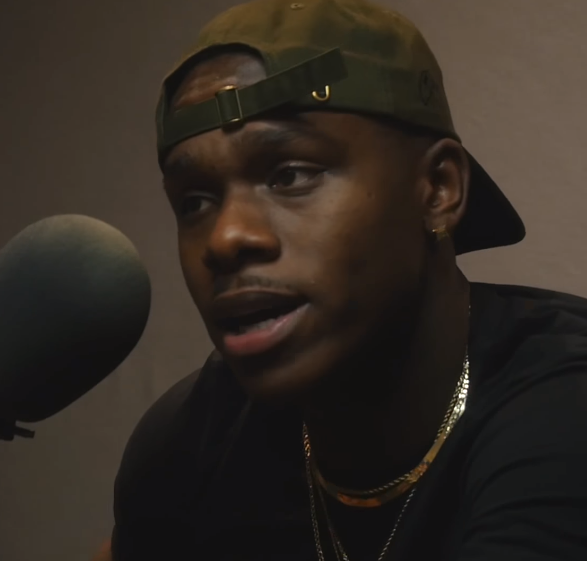
DaBaby is featured on a remix of "Levitating".

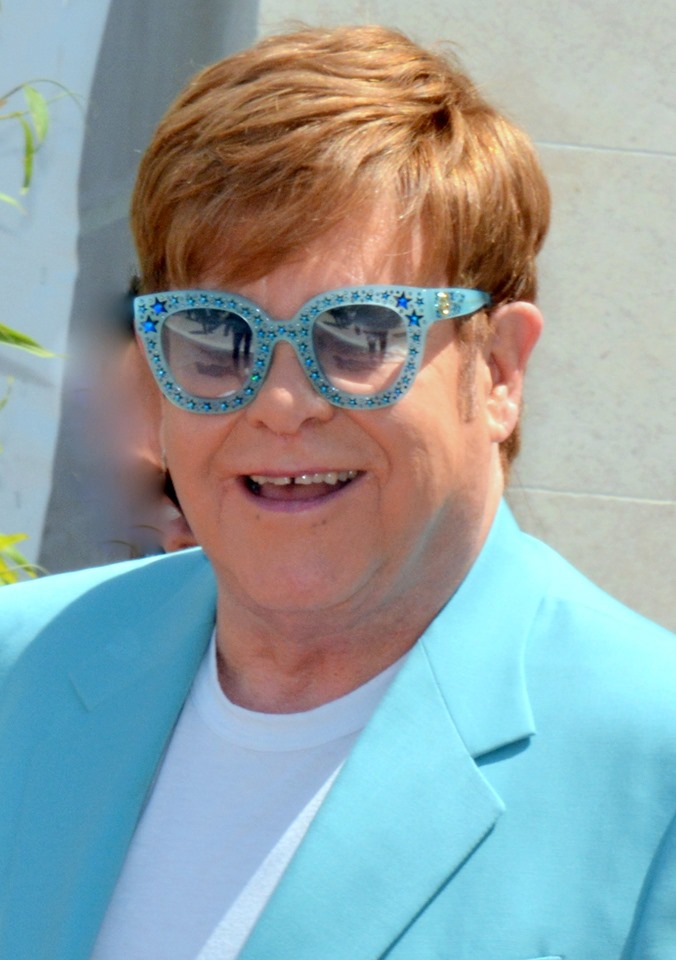
Elton John included Lipa on "Cold Heart (Pnau remix)", a mashup of some of his songs.

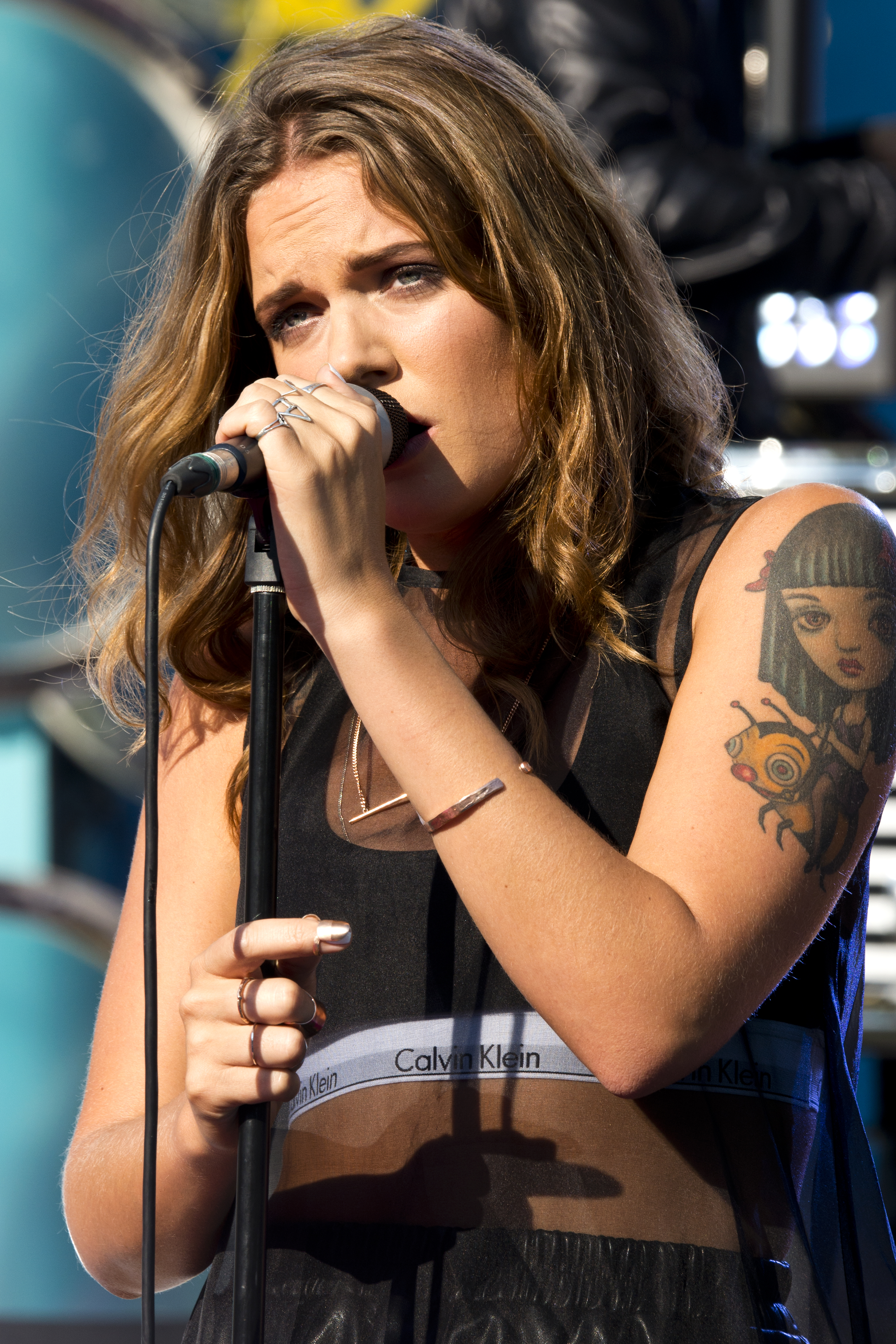
Tove Lo co-wrote "Cool".

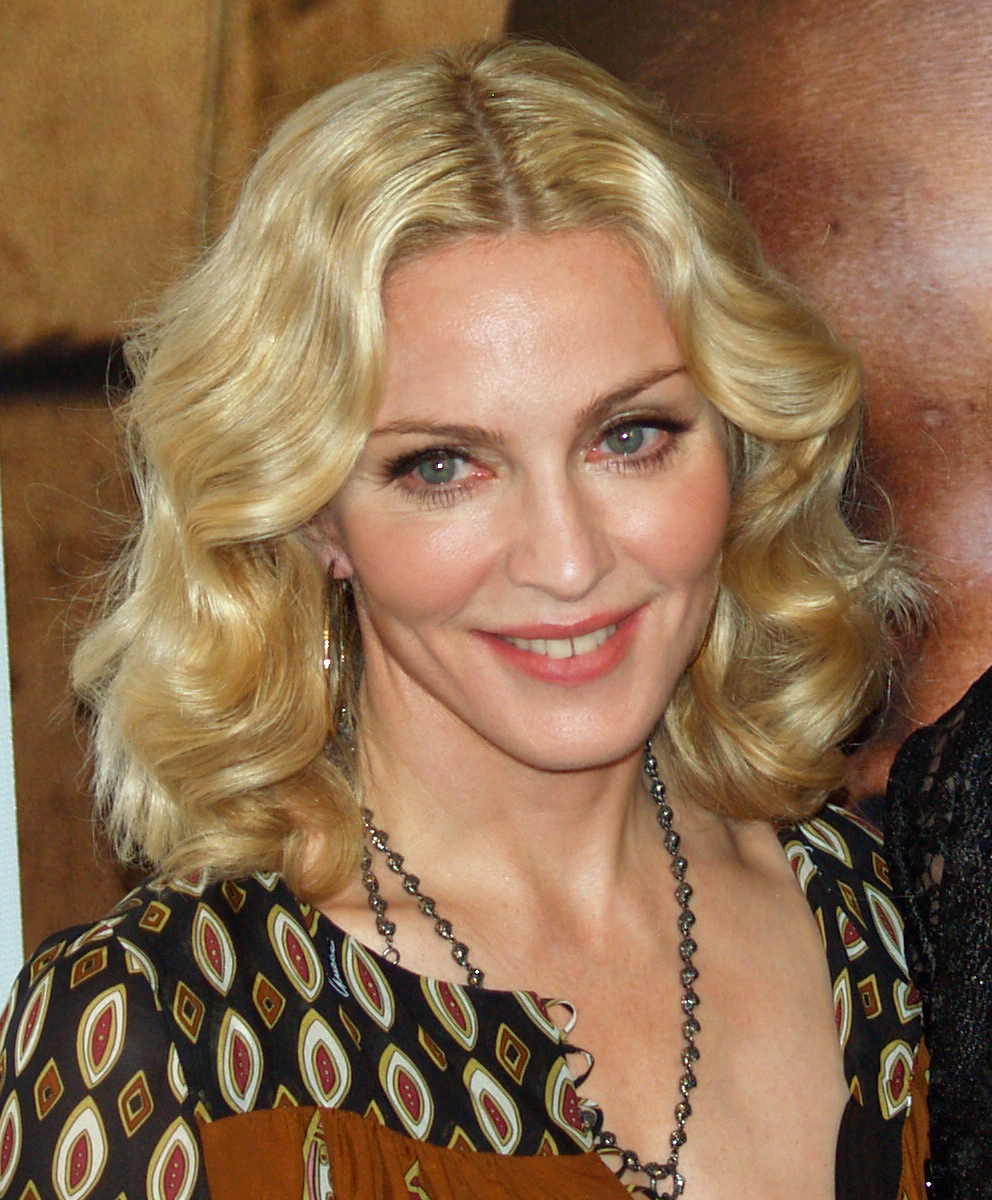
Madonna is featured on a remix of "Levitating".

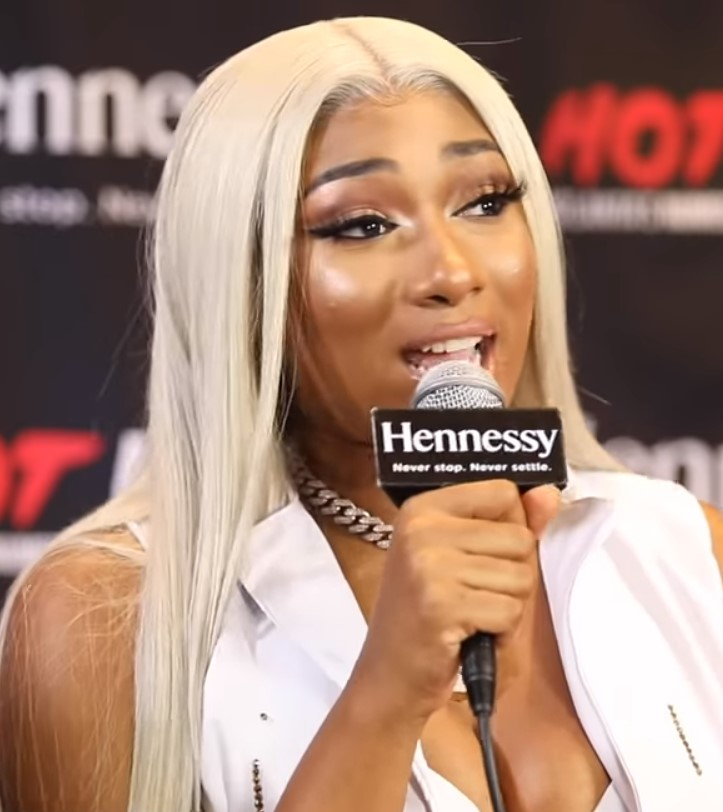
Megan Thee Stallion collaborated with Lipa on "Sweetest Pie"

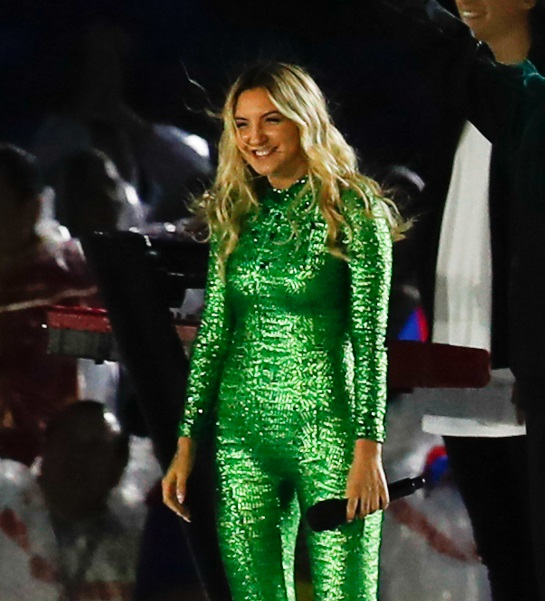
Julia Michaels co-wrote "Fever" and "Pretty Please".

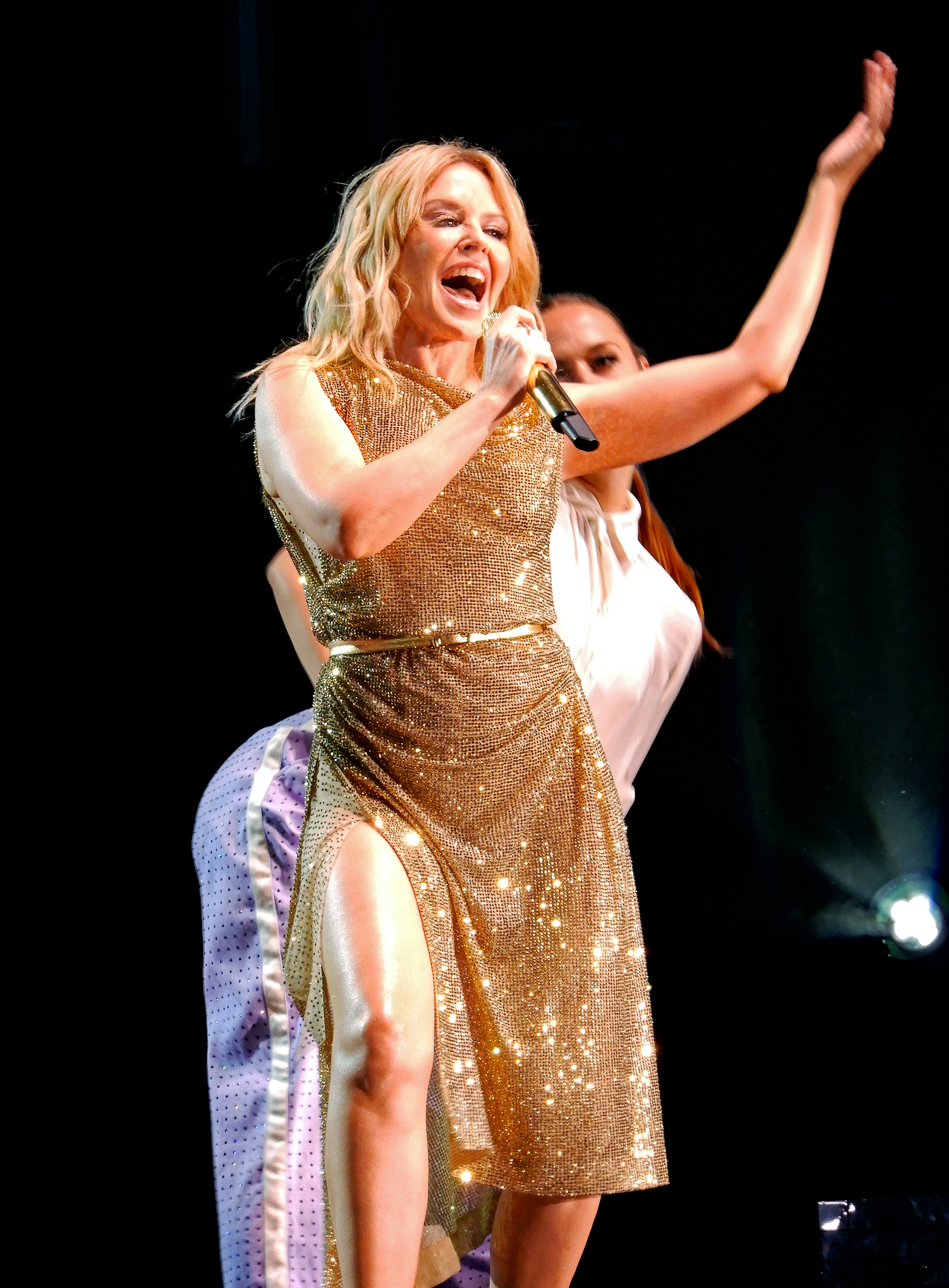
Lipa is featured on the Studio 2054 remix of Kylie Minogue's "Real Groove".

Key
†	Indicates a cover of another artist's previous work
#	Indicates a remix of another artist's previous work

List of songs, showing featured performers, writers, album, and year released
Song	Artist(s)	Writer(s)	Album	Year	Ref.
"Anything for Love"	Dua Lipa	Dua Lipa; Ian Kirkpatrick; Danny L Harle; Tobias Jesso Jr. Julia Michaels; Caroline Ailin	Radical Optimism and Radical Optimism (Extended Versions) and Dua Lipa Live From Royal Albert Hall	2024	
"Bad Together"	Dua Lipa	Dua Lipa; Chelcee Grimes; Tom Barnes; Ben Kohn; Peter Kelleher	Dua Lipa (Deluxe edition)	2017	
"Bang Bang" (Note: Cher cover) †	Dua Lipa	Sonny Bono	Dua Lipa (Italian special edition)	2017	
"Be the One"	Dua Lipa	Lucy Taylor; Digital Farm Animals; Jack Tarrant	Spotify Sessions (EP) and Be the One (EP) and The Only (EP) and Dua Lipa and Dua Lipa Live From Royal Albert Hall	2015	
"Begging"	Dua Lipa	Dua Lipa; Cara Salimando; James Flannigan; Gabe Simon	Dua Lipa	2017	
"Blow Your Mind (Mwah)"	Dua Lipa	Dua Lipa; Jon Levine; Lauren Christy	The Only (EP) and Dua Lipa	2016	
"Boys Will Be Boys"	Dua Lipa	Dua Lipa; Kennedi; Justin Tranter; Jason Evigan	Future Nostalgia	2020	
"Break My Heart"	Dua Lipa	Dua Lipa; Andrew Wotman; Ali Tamposi; Stefan Johnson; Jordan K. Johnson; Andrew Farriss; Michael Hutchence	Future Nostalgia	2020	
"Bridge over Troubled Water" (Note: Simon & Garfunkel cover) †	Artists for Grenfell (Note: Composed of Lipa, Angel, Anne-Marie, James Arthur, Carl Barât, James Blunt, Roger Daltrey, Craig David, Deno, Donae'o, Fleur East, Mr Eazi, Ella Eyre, Paloma Faith, Shane Filan, Matt Goss, Tom Grennan, Tony Hadley, Geri Halliwell, Ella Henderson, Jessie J, Louisa Johnson, Kelly Jones, Labrinth, Leona Lewis, the London Community Gospel Choir, Pixie Lott, Gareth Malone and The Choir for Grenfell, Brian May, Jon McClure, 5 After Midnight, Tokio Myers, John Newman, Omar, Rita Ora, Liam Payne, Gregory Porter, Nile Rodgers, Emeli Sandé, Ray BLK, Raye, Shakka, Jorja Smith, Dan Smith, Stormzy, Nathan Sykes, Matt Terry, Louis Tomlinson, Pete Townshend, Tulisa, Jessie Ware, Robbie Williams and WSTRN)	Paul Simon	None	2017	
"Can They Hear Us"	Dua Lipa	Dua Lipa; Clarence Coffee Jr.	Gully	2021	
"Cold Heart (Pnau remix)"‡	Elton John and Dua Lipa	Elton John; Bernie Taupin; Nicholas Littlemore; Peter Mayes; Sam Littlemore	The Lockdown Sessions and Dua Lipa Live From Royal Albert Hall	2021	
"Cool"	Dua Lipa	Dua Lipa; Camille Purcell; Shakka Philip; Ben Kohn; Tom Barnes; Pete Kelleher; Tove Lo	Future Nostalgia	2020	
"Dance the Night"	Dua Lipa	Dua Lipa; Caroline Ailin; Andrew Wyatt; Mark Ronson	Barbie the Album and Dua Lipa Live From Royal Albert Hall	2023	
"Demeanor"‡	Pop Smoke featuring Dua Lipa	Bashar Jackson; Daniel Mlzrahi; Dru De Caro; Dua Lipa; Mantra; Michael Gomes	Faith	2021	
"Do I Wanna Know?" (Note: Arctic Monkeys cover) †	Dua Lipa	Alex Turner	BBC Radio 1's Live Lounge 2018	2018	
"Don't Start Now"	Dua Lipa	Dua Lipa; Caroline Ailin; Emily Warren; Ian Kirkpatrick	Future Nostalgia and Dua Lipa Live From Royal Albert Hall	2019	
"Dreams"	Dua Lipa	Dua Lipa; Tom Neville; Chelcee Grimes	Dua Lipa (Deluxe edition)	2017	
"Electricity"‡	Silk City and Dua Lipa featuring Diplo and Mark Ronson	Mark Ronson; Thomas Wesley Pentz; Diana Gordon; Romy Madley Croft; Dua Lipa; Philip Meckseper; Jacob Olofsson; Rami Dawod; Maxime Picard; Clément Picard	Electricity and Dua Lipa: Complete Edition	2018	
"End of An Era"	Dua Lipa	Dua Lipa; Kevin Parker; Danny L Harle; Caroline Ailin; Tobias Jesso Jr.	Radical Optimism and Radical Optimism (Extended Versions) and Dua Lipa Live From Royal Albert Hall	2024	
"Falling Forever"	Dua Lipa	Dua Lipa; Ian Kirkpatrick; Danny L Harle; Emily Warren; Ali Tamposi; Caroline Ailin	Radical Optimism and Radical Optimism (Extended Versions) and Dua Lipa Live From Royal Albert Hall	2024	
"Fever"‡	Dua Lipa and Angèle	Dua Lipa; Ian Kirkpatrick; Julia Michaels; Caroline Ailin; Angèle; Jacob Kasher Hindlin	Future Nostalgia (French edition)	2020	
"For Julian"	Dua Lipa	Dua Lipa; Eg White	The Only (EP) and Dua Lipa (Japan Special edition)	2016	
"French Exit"	Dua Lipa	Dua Lipa; Kevin Parker; Danny L Harle; Caroline Ailin; Tobias Jesso Jr.	Radical Optimism and Radical Optimism (Extended Versions) and Dua Lipa Live From Royal Albert Hall	2024	
"Future Nostalgia"	Dua Lipa	Dua Lipa; Jeff Bhasker; Clarence Coffee Jr.	Future Nostalgia	2019	
"Garden"	Dua Lipa	Dua Lipa; Greg Wells; Sean Douglas	Dua Lipa	2017	
"Genesis"	Dua Lipa	Dua Lipa; Andreas Schuller; Sarah Hudson; Coffee	Dua Lipa	2017	
"Golden Slumbers" (Note: The Beatles cover) †	Dua Lipa	John Lennon; Paul McCartney	Live Acoustic	2017	
"Good in Bed"	Dua Lipa	Dua Lipa; Michel "Lindgren" Shulz; Melanie Joy Fontana; Taylor Upsahl; David Charles Marshall Biral; Denzel Michael-Akil Baptiste	Future Nostalgia	2020	
"Hallucinate"	Dua Lipa	Dua Lipa; Samuel George Lewis; Sophie Frances Cooke	Future Nostalgia	2020	
"Happy for You"	Dua Lipa	Dua Lipa; Kevin Parker; Danny L Harle; Caroline Ailin; Tobias Jesso Jr.	Radical Optimism and Radical Optimism (Extended Versions) and Dua Lipa Live From Royal Albert Hall	2024	
"Handlebars"	Jennie featuring Dua Lipa	Dua Lipa; Rob Bisel; Amy Allen; Brittany Amaradio; James Ghaleb	Ruby	2025	
"High"	Whethan and Dua Lipa	Sarah Aarons; Jonathan Hill; Dua Lipa; Ethan Snoreck	Fifty Shades Freed	2018	
"High, Wild & Free"	Dua Lipa	Dua Lipa; Toby Gad; Sarah Hudson	None	2018	
"Homesick"	Dua Lipa and Chris Martin	Dua Lipa; Chris Martin	Dua Lipa	2017	
"Hotter than Hell"	Dua Lipa	Dua Lipa; Adam Midgley; Tommy Baxter; Gerard O'Connell	Spotify Sessions (EP) and The Only (EP) and Dua Lipa	2016	
"Houdini"	Dua Lipa	Dua Lipa; Kevin Parker; Danny L Harle; Caroline Ailin; Tobias Jesso Jr.	Radical Optimism and Radical Optimism (Extended Versions) and Dua Lipa Live From Royal Albert Hall	2023	
"I'd Rather Go Blind" (Note: Etta James cover) †	Dua Lipa	Etta James; Ellington Jordan; Billy Foster	Live Acoustic	2017	
"IDGAF"	Dua Lipa	Dua Lipa; MNEK; Larzz Principato; Skyler Stonestreet; Whiskey Waters	Dua Lipa and Deezer Sessions	2017/2018	
"If It Ain't Me" (Note: A version of "If It Ain't Me" featuring Normani was leaked, however it remains unreleased.)	Dua Lipa	Dua Lipa; Taylor Parks; Robin Oliver Frid; Uzoechi Emenike	Future Nostalgia: The Moonlight Edition	2021	
"If Only"‡	Andrea Bocelli featuring Dua Lipa	Francesco Sartori; Mauro Malavasi	Sì	2018	
"Illusion"	Dua Lipa	Dua Lipa; Caroline Ailin; Danny L Harle; Kevin Paker; Tobias Jesso Jr.	Radical Optimism and Radical Optimism (Extended Versions) and Dua Lipa Live From Royal Albert Hall	2024	
"In the Room : Tears Dry on Their Own" (Note: Amy Winehouse cover) †	Dua Lipa and Gallant	Amy Winehouse; Nickolas Ashford; Valerie Simpson	Live Acoustic	2017	
"I'm Not the Only One" (Note: Sam Smith cover) †	Dua Lipa	Sam Smith; James Napier	Spotify Sessions (EP)	2016	
"Kiss and Make Up"‡	Dua Lipa and Blackpink	Dua Lipa; Chelcee Grimes; Yannick Rastogi; Zacharie Raymond; Mathieu Jomphe-Lepine; Marc Vincent; Teddy Park	Dua Lipa: Complete Edition	2018	
"Last Dance"	Dua Lipa	Dua Lipa; Stephen "Koz" Kozmeniuk; Talay Riley	Be the One (EP) and Dua Lipa (Deluxe edition)	2016	
"Levitating" (Note: A remix of "Levitating" by the Blessed Madonna appears on their remix album Club Future Nostalgia and serves as its lead single. It features Madonna and Missy Elliott who add new verses, which they wrote, replacing the second verse and middle eight. A second remix featuring DaBaby was released alongside the original as a single from Future Nostalgia. He adds a new intro and replaces the second verse with a new one, both of which he wrote.)	Dua Lipa and the Blessed Madonna featuring Madonna and Missy Elliott or DaBaby	Dua Lipa; Clarence Coffee Jr. Sarah Hudson; Stephen Kozmeniuk	Future Nostalgia and Club Future Nostalgia and Dua Lipa Live From Royal Albert Hall	2020	
"Lost in Your Light"‡	Dua Lipa featuring Miguel	Dua Lipa; Miguel; Rick Nowels	Dua Lipa	2017	
"Love Again"	Dua Lipa	Dua Lipa; Clarence Coffee Jr. Stephen Kozmeniuk; Chelcee Grimes; Bing Crosby; Max Wartell; Irving Wallman	Future Nostalgia and Dua Lipa Live From Royal Albert Hall	2020	
"Love Is Religion (The Blessed Madonna remix)" (Note: The non-remixed version of "Love Is Religion" remains unreleased.)	Dua Lipa	Dua Lipa; Clarence Coffee Jr. Sarah Hudson; Uzoechi Emenike; Grades; Stephen Kozmeniuk	Club Future Nostalgia	2020	
"Maria"	Dua Lipa	Dua Lipa; Andrew Watt; Danny L Harle; Julia Michaels; Caroline Ailin	Radical Optimism and Radical Optimism (Extended Versions) and Dua Lipa Live From Royal Albert Hall	2024	
"My Love"‡	Wale featuring Major Lazer, Wizkid and Dua Lipa	Olubowale Akintimehin; Thomas Pentz; Clément Picard; Maxime Picard; Ayodeji Balogun; Eric Bellinger	Shine	2017	
"My My My" (Note: Troye Sivan cover) †	Dua Lipa	Troye Sivan Mellet; Brett McLaughlin; Oscar Görres; James Alan Ghaleb	Deezer Sessions	2019	
"New Love"	Dua Lipa	Dua Lipa; Emile Haynie; Andrew Wyatt	Spotify Sessions (EP) and Be the One (EP) and The Only (EP) and Dua Lipa (Deluxe edition)	2015	
"New Rules"	Dua Lipa	Caroline Ailin; Emily Warren; Ian Kirkpatrick	Dua Lipa and Deezer Sessions and Live Acoustic	2017	
"No Goodbyes"	Dua Lipa	Dua Lipa; Dan Traynor; Lindy Robbins; Ilsey Juber	Dua Lipa	2017	
"No Lie"	Sean Paul featuring Dua Lipa	Andrew Jackson; Emily Warren; Jamie "Sermstyle" Sanderson; Philip "Pip" Kembo; Sean Paul Henriques	Mad Love the Prequel and Dua Lipa: Complete Edition	2016	
"Not My Problem"‡	Dua Lipa featuring JID	Dua Lipa; Clarence Coffee Jr. Sarah Hudson; Stephen Kozmeniuk; Destin Choice Route	Future Nostalgia: The Moonlight Edition	2021	
"One Kiss"‡	Calvin Harris and Dua Lipa	Adam Wiles; Jessie Reyez; Dua Lipa	Dua Lipa: Complete Edition	2018	
"One Dance" (Note: Drake featuring Wizkid, Kyla cover) †	Dua Lipa	Drake; Paul Jefferies; Ayodeji Balogun; Noah Shebib; Errol Reid; Luke Reid; Kyla Smith; Corey Johnson; Logan Sama	Live at Jingle Bell Ball 2016	2016	
"Oye Mi Amor"	Dua Lipa featuring Fher of Maná	Fher Olvera Alex González	Live from Mexico	2026	
"Physical" (Note: A remix of "Physical" featuring Hwasa was released in promotion of the song. It features her singing in Korean, replacing the first verse. Another remix of the song by Mark Ronson was included on Lipa and the Blessed Madonna's remix album Club Future Nostalgia. It features the second verse re-recorded by Gwen Stefani. In 2025, a remix with Troye Sivan was released to celebrate the fifth anniversary of Future Nostalgia.)	Dua Lipa	Dua Lipa; Jason Evigan; Clarence Coffee Jr; Sarah Hudson	Future Nostalgia	2020	
"Potion"‡	Calvin Harris, Dua Lipa and Young Thug	Dua Lipa; Adam Wiles; Jessie Reyez; Maneesh Bidaye; Jeffery Williams	Funk Wav Bounces Vol. 2	2022	
"Pretty Please"	Dua Lipa	Dua Lipa; Julia Michaels; Caroline Ailin; Ian Kirkpatrick	Future Nostalgia and Dua Lipa Live From Royal Albert Hall	2020	
"Prisoner"‡	Miley Cyrus featuring Dua Lipa	Miley Cyrus; Andrew Wotman; Jordan K. Johnson; Marcus Lomax; Stefan Johnson; Ali Tamposi; Jonathan Bellion; Michael Pollack; Dua Lipa	Plastic Hearts and Future Nostalgia: The Moonlight Edition	2020	
"Real Groove (Studio 2054 remix)" #	Kylie Minogue and Dua Lipa	Kylie Minogue; Teemu Brunila; Nico Stadi; Alida Garpestad	Real Groove	2020	
"Rollin' / Did You See" (Note: Mashup cover of Calvin Harris featuring Future and Khalid, and J Hus) †	Dua Lipa featuring Miguel	Adam Wiles; Nayvadius Wilburn; Khalid Robinson; Momodou Jallow; Jonathan Mensah	BBC Radio 1's Live Lounge 2017	2017	
"Room for 2"	Dua Lipa	Dua Lipa; Tom Neville; Autumn Rowe	Dua Lipa (Deluxe edition)	2016	
"Running"	Dua Lipa	Dua Lipa; Andrew Wyatt	Dua Lipa: Complete Edition	2018	
"Scared to Be Lonely"	Martin Garrix and Dua Lipa	Martijn Garritsen; Georgia Ku; Nathaniel Campany; Kyle Shearer; Giorgio Tuinfort	The Martin Garrix Collection and The Martin Garrix Collection (Deluxe) and The Martin Garrix Experience and Dua Lipa: Complete Edition	2016/2017	
"Sugar (remix)" #	Brockhampton featuring Dua Lipa	Dua Lipa; Brian Casey; Chuks Chiejine; Ciarán McDonald; Dominique Simpson; Ian Simpson; Jabari Manwarring; Jermaine Dupri; Jonathan Buck; Manuel Seal Jr. Matthew Champion; Romil Hemnani; Russell Boring; Ryan Beatty; Usher Raymond; William Wood	Ginger	2020	
"Sunshine (Live from the Royal Albert Hall)"	Dua Lipa and The Heritage Orchestra	Cleopatra Nikolic Dean Josiah Cover	Dua Lipa Live from the Royal Albert Hall	2024	
"Swan Song"	Dua Lipa	Justin Tranter; Kennedi Lykken; Mattias Larsson; Robin Fredriksson; Thomas Holkenborg; Dua Lipa	Alita: Battle Angel	2019	
"Sweetest Pie"‡	Megan Thee Stallion and Dua Lipa	Megan Pete; Dua Lipa; Clarence Coffee Jr. Joshua Isaiah Parker; Nija Aisha-Alayja Charles; Sarah Hudson; Stephen Kozmeniuk	Traumazine	2022	
"That Kind of Woman" (Note: A remix of "That Kind of Woman" by Jacques Lu Cont was originally released on Lipa and the Blessed Madonna's remix album Club Future Nostalgia, prior to the original.)	Dua Lipa	Dua Lipa; Justin Parker; Sam Dew; Clarence Coffee Jr	Future Nostalgia: The Moonlight Edition	2021	
"These Walls" (Note: An alternative version of "These Walls" featuring Belgian singer Pierre de Maere was released as the fourth single from Radical Optimism on 8 November 2024.)	Dua Lipa featuring Pierre de Maere	Dua Lipa; Andrew Watt; Danny L Harle; Billy Walsh; Caroline Ailin Elodie Charmensat Pierre de Maere	Radical Optimism and Radical Optimism (Extended Versions) and Dua Lipa Live From Royal Albert Hall	2024	
"The Hills" (Note: The Weeknd cover) †	Dua Lipa	Abel Tesfaye; Emmanuel Nickerson; Carlo Montagnese; Ahmad Balshe	BBC Radio 1's Live Lounge 2016	2016	
"Thinking 'Bout You"	Dua Lipa	Dua Lipa; Adam Argyle	Spotify Sessions (EP) and Dua Lipa and Deezer Sessions	2016/2017	
"Think I'm in Love with You (Live From The 59th ACM Awards)"	Chris Stapleton and Dua Lipa	Chris Stapleton	None	2024	
"Times Like These" (Note: Foo Fighters cover) †	Live Lounge Allstars (Note: Composed of Lipa, Anne-Marie, Grace Carter, Celeste, Paloma Faith, Sam Fender, Jess Glynne, Ellie Goulding, Dave Grohl, Taylor Hawkins, Luke Hemmings, James Johnston, Ben Johnston, Dermot Kennedy, Mike Kerr, Zara Larsson, Mabel, Rag'n'Bone Man, Chris Martin, Simon Neil, Rita Ora, Sean Paul, Sigrid, Dan Smith, Fraser T. Smith, Hailee Steinfeld, Ben Thatcher, AJ Tracey, Chris Wood, Yungblud)	Dave Grohl; Taylor Hawkins; Nate Mendel; Chris Shiflett	None	2020	
"Training Season"	Dua Lipa	Dua Lipa; Kevin Parker; Danny L Harle; Caroline Ailin; Tobias Jesso Jr. Nick Gale; Martina Sorbara; Shaun Frank; Yaakov Gruzman; Steve Francis Richard Mastroianni	Radical Optimism and Radical Optimism (Extended Versions) and Dua Lipa Live From Royal Albert Hall	2024	
"Two Hearts"	Danny L Harle and Dua Lipa	Danny L Harle; Dua Lipa; Andrew Wyatt	Cerulean	2026	
"Un Día (One Day)"‡	J Balvin, Dua Lipa, Bad Bunny and Tainy	Dua Lipa; José Álvaro Osorio Balvín; Benito Antonio Martínez Ocasio; Daystar Peterson; Marco Masís; Alejandro Borrero; Ivanni Rodriguez; Clarence Coffee Jr.	Future Nostalgia: The Moonlight Edition and Jose	2020	
"Want To"	Dua Lipa	Dua Lipa; Amish Dilipkumar Patel; Andrew Jackson	Dua Lipa: Complete Edition	2018	
"We're Good"	Dua Lipa	Dua Lipa; Sylvester Willy Sivertsen; Emily Warren; Scott Harris	Future Nostalgia: The Moonlight Edition	2021	
"Whatcha Doing"	Dua Lipa	Dua Lipa; Kevin Parker; Danny L Harle; Caroline Ailin; Ali Tamposi	Radical Optimism and Radical Optimism (Extended Versions) and Dua Lipa Live From Royal Albert Hall	2024	

== Unreleased songs ==
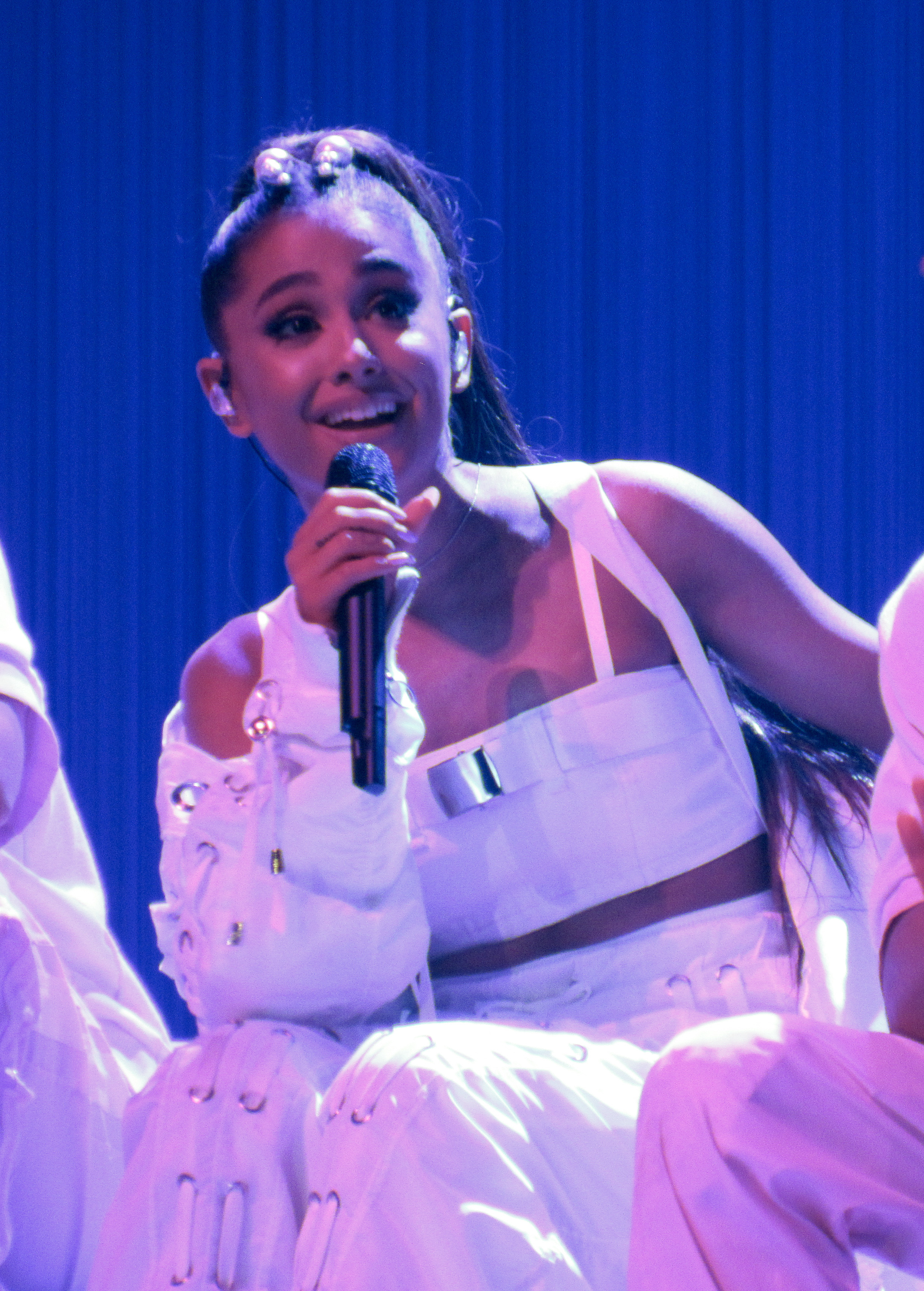
Lipa and Ariana Grande have an unreleased collaboration titled "Bad to You" that was later released without Lipa.

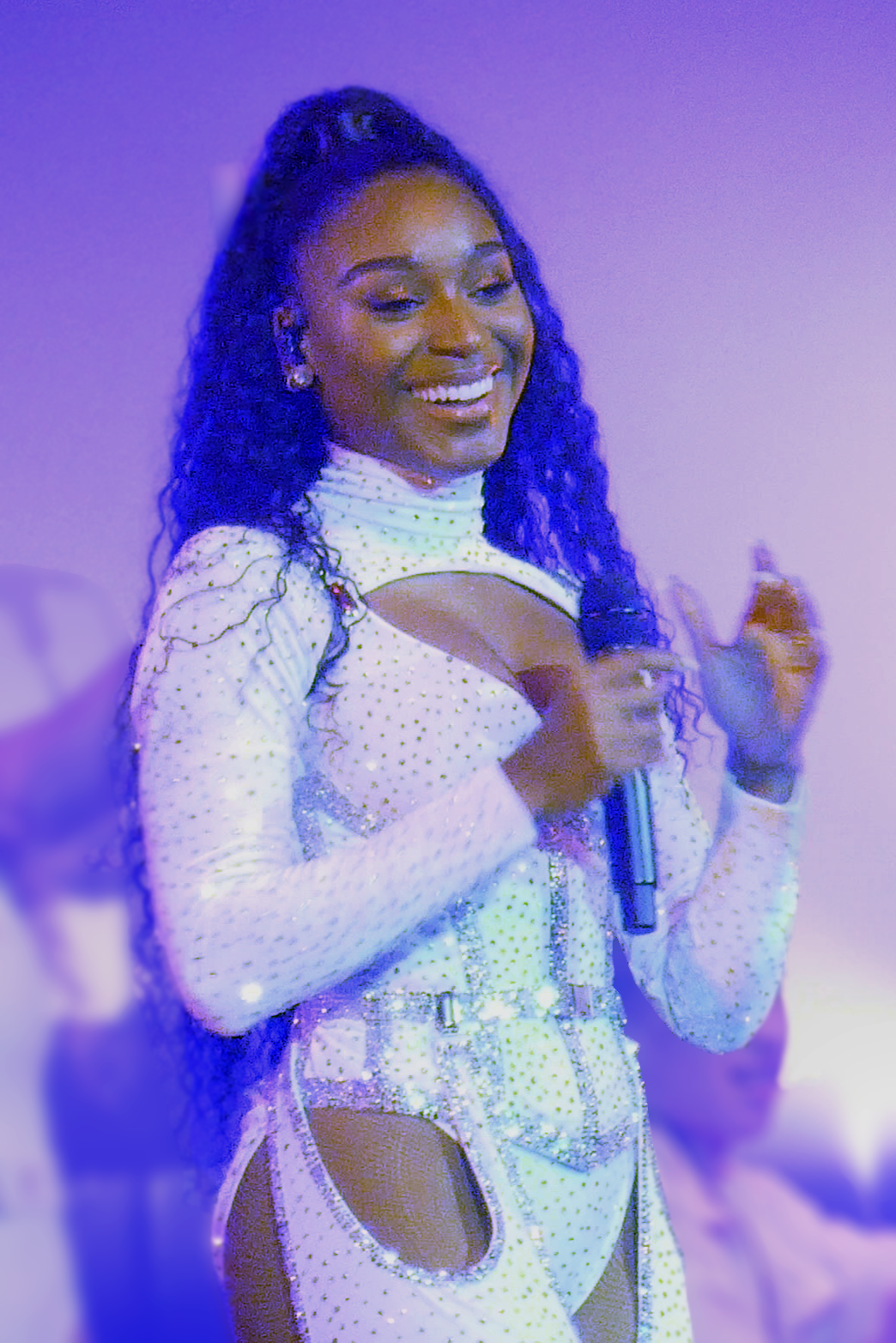
Normani is featured on an alternate version of "If It Ain't Me", which is currently unreleased.

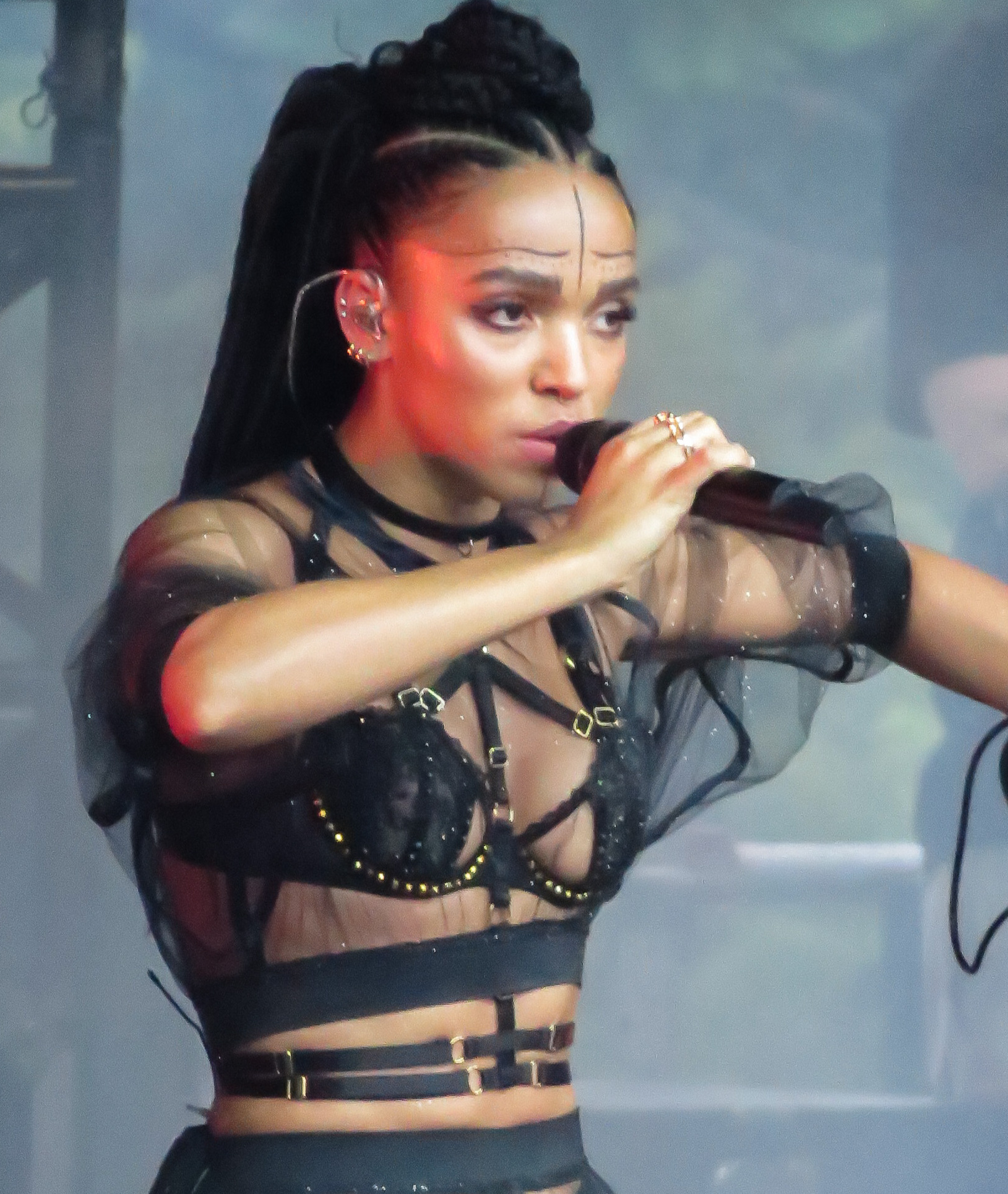
Lipa and FKA Twigs collaborated on the currently unreleased "Why Don't You Love Me".

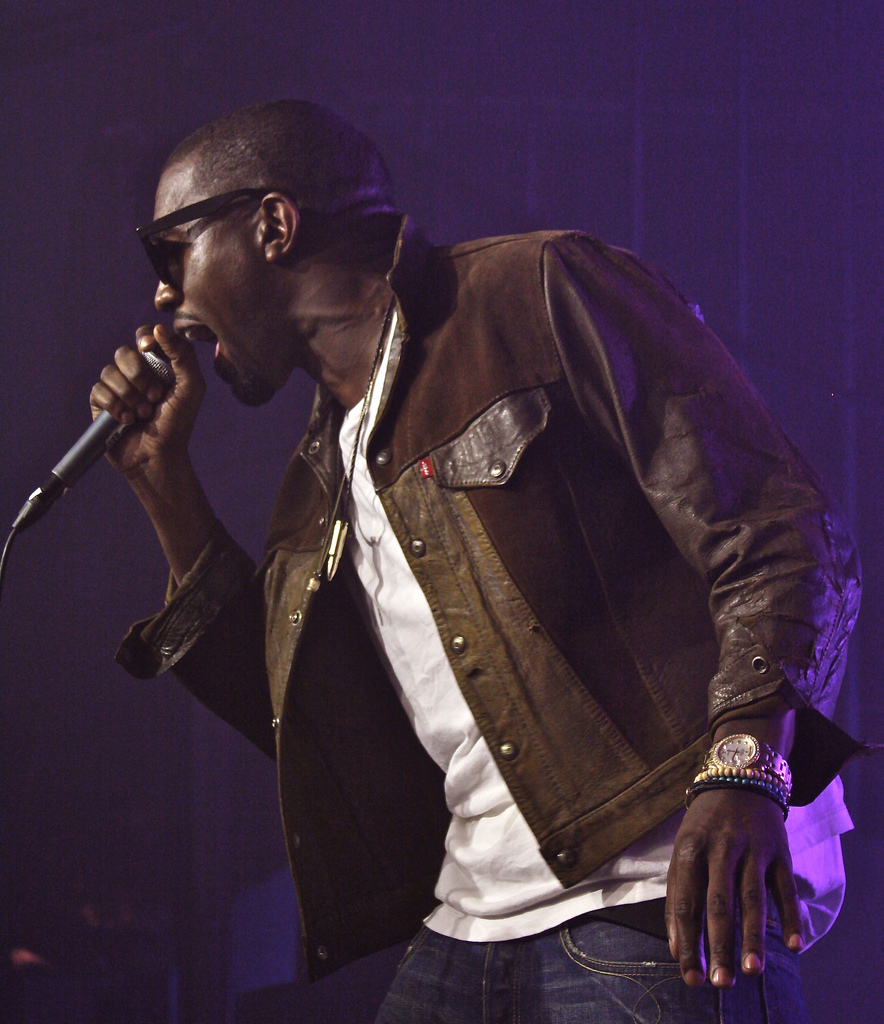
Kanye West featured Lipa on an unreleased song "Law of Attraction".

List of unreleased songs showing notes about them
Song	Notes	Ref.
"Bad to You"	Collaboration with Ariana Grande; Recorded in January 2018; Leaked in April 2018; Intended for Future Nostalgia; Later released by Grande, Normani and Nicki Minaj on the Charlie's Angels Soundtrack (2019)	
"Ball & Chain"	Intended for Future Nostalgia; Lipa asked Katy Perry to appear on the song, however it was not possible due to scheduling conflicts.	
"Blame"	Written by Lipa, Laura Dockrill, David Eriksen and Josh Record; Registered with the American Society of Composers, Authors and Publishers (ASCAP)	
"Carry On"	Initial version was written by Josh Cumbee, Natalie Dunn, Kyrre Gørvell-Dahll, Ilan Kidron and Afshin Salmani; Was set to feature Swae Lee; Alternative versions were recorded by Kelly Rowland, Charlie Puth and Rita Ora respectively; The version featuring Ora is credited to Kygo & Ora, and features on Detective Pikachu (2019)	
"Down Boys"	Written by Lipa, Adriano Buffone and Amy Wadge; Registered with ASCAP	
"Follow Me"	Written by Lipa, Christopher Paul Peers and Fraser T. Smith; Registered with ASCAP	
"Good Times"	Rework of Jamie xx's song "I Know There's Gonna Be (Good Times)" (2015); Uploaded to her YouTube channel in 2015; Performed during selected promotion for Dua Lipa	
"I'm Free"	The Rolling Stones cover; Featured in ads for Lipa's campaigns with Yves Saint Laurent	
"Law of Attraction"	Kanye West song featuring Lipa; Intended for West's scrapped album Yandhi; Recorded in March 2019; Leaked in October 2020	
"Lions & Tigers & Bears"	Lipa's first demo; Uploaded to Lipa's SoundCloud in 2012; Produced by Ryan Laubscher	
"Momentum"	Collaboration with Don Diablo; Written by Norman Cook, Dale Peters and Joe Walsh; Registered with ASCAP	
"On My Own"	Written by Lipa, James Thomas New and Josef Simon Sebastian Page; Registered with ASCAP	
"Someone You're Not"	Written by Lipa, Adam Argyle and Iain James; Registered with ASCAP	
"When It Comes To Us"	Written by Tommy Baxter, Sophie Cook, Adam Midgley and Gerard O'Connell; Registered with ASCAP	
"Why Don't You Love Me"	Collaboration with FKA Twigs and Jorja Smith; Produced by J. White Did It; Recorded in 2020; Confirmed by Lipa in November 2020; Performed by Lipa and Twigs at Studio 2054; Described as a trap-leaning track with a minimal, glitchy beat; Twigs intends on releasing it, however it remains unfinished	
"You Boy"	Written by Lipa, Lauren Christy and Jon Levine; Registered with ASCAP	
"You the One"	Written by Lipa, Phil Cook and Chelcee Grimes; Registered with ASCAP	

== See also ==
- Dua Lipa discography
