= Jahleel Weaver =

American fashion designer

- Born: 1987 (age 38–39)
- Occupation: Stylist
- Known for: Fashion styling

Jahleel Weaver (born 1987) is an American fashion designer, stylist, and deputy creative director of Rihanna's fashion house, Fenty, from 2019 to 2021.

== Biography ==
The designer grew up in the suburbs of Maryland to Jamaican-Panamanian immigrants. His mother worked for a law firm and his dad owns a funeral home. He studied fashion design at LIM College.

Weaver's first styling job was for Vogue Italia, where he assisted with styling Usher. He then worked as assistant stylist alongside Mel Ottenberg, who has been styling singer Rihanna since 2005. Starting in 2014, when Rihanna launched the umbrella company Fenty Corp., she invited Weaver to join as a junior creative designer. In 2019, he became the deputy creative director of Rihanna's new fashion house Fenty, which closed down two years later in 2021.

In 2024, he launched his own consultancy studio, pursued consultant work with Rihanna, and started working as a stylist with Dua Lipa.

== Private life ==
He is gay.
