= Pretty Please (Dua Lipa song) =

2020 song by Dua Lipa

Song by Dua Lipa

from the album Future Nostalgia
- Studio: TaP (London); Zenseven (Los Angeles)
- Genre: Disco-pop; electro-R&B; funk
- Length: 3:14
- Label: Warner
- Songwriters: Dua Lipa; Julia Michaels; Caroline Ailin; Ian Kirkpatrick
- Producer: Ian Kirkpatrick

Lyric video
- "Pretty Please" on YouTube

"Pretty Please" is a song by English singer Dua Lipa from her second studio album, Future Nostalgia, released on 27 March 2020. The song was written by Lipa alongside Julia Michaels, Caroline Ailin and the sole producer Ian Kirkpatrick. It was created by the writing team during studio sessions, taking shape from the bassline and title. It is a disco-pop, electro-R&B and funk song with a stripped-back production driven by a funky bass. The song has a chill sound, however its meaning is the opposite; in the lyrics, Lipa pleas for stress relief from her lover after promising she will be chill at the beginning of a relationship, before realizing that is unlike her. Several critics commended the production and lyrics.

Commercially, "Pretty Please" reached numbers 48, 79 and 101 respectively in Lithuania, Slovakia and Portugal, while also charting at number 70 on the UK Official Audio Streaming Chart. The song was awarded a gold certification in Canada from Music Canada. Remixes by Masters at Work and Midland were released on Lipa and the Blessed Madonna's remix album, Club Future Nostalgia. Lipa promoted the song with numerous live performances, including ones at the FIFA 21 world premiere, the Elton John AIDS Foundation Academy Award Party and the 2021 Brit Awards. A video of Lipa performing the song at Lovestream Festival in 2022 went viral on social media that same year.

== Background and production ==
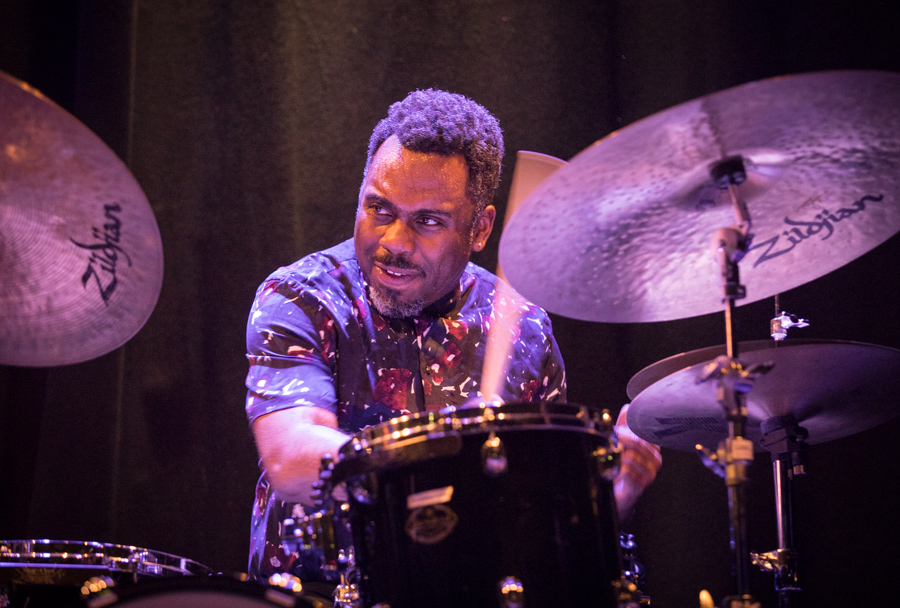
Producer Ian Kirkpatrick was inspired by Nate Smith for the percussion of "Pretty Please".

"Pretty Please" was written by Dua Lipa, Julia Michaels, Caroline Ailin and Ian Kirkpatrick. The song was recorded at Zenseven Studios in Los Angeles while the vocals were recorded at TaP Studio in London. Josh Gudwin mixed the song at Henson Studios in Hollywood and Chris Gehringer mastered it at Sterling Sound in Edgewater, New Jersey. The songwriting team had written a song together before and "Pretty Please" came about after they decided to see what they would get out of writing another song. The group played music in the session before Kirkpatrick began working on the production with the bassline. They started writing the lyrics with the title of "Pretty Please" and built a story based on that. Michaels had the idea to slow down the song before the chorus and as for the overall pace, Kirkpatrick used a tempo track to match the tempo in which Lipa sang at. The producer ended up singing the backing vocal "pretty" that is layered in the mix, while Michaels sang backing vocal harmonies.

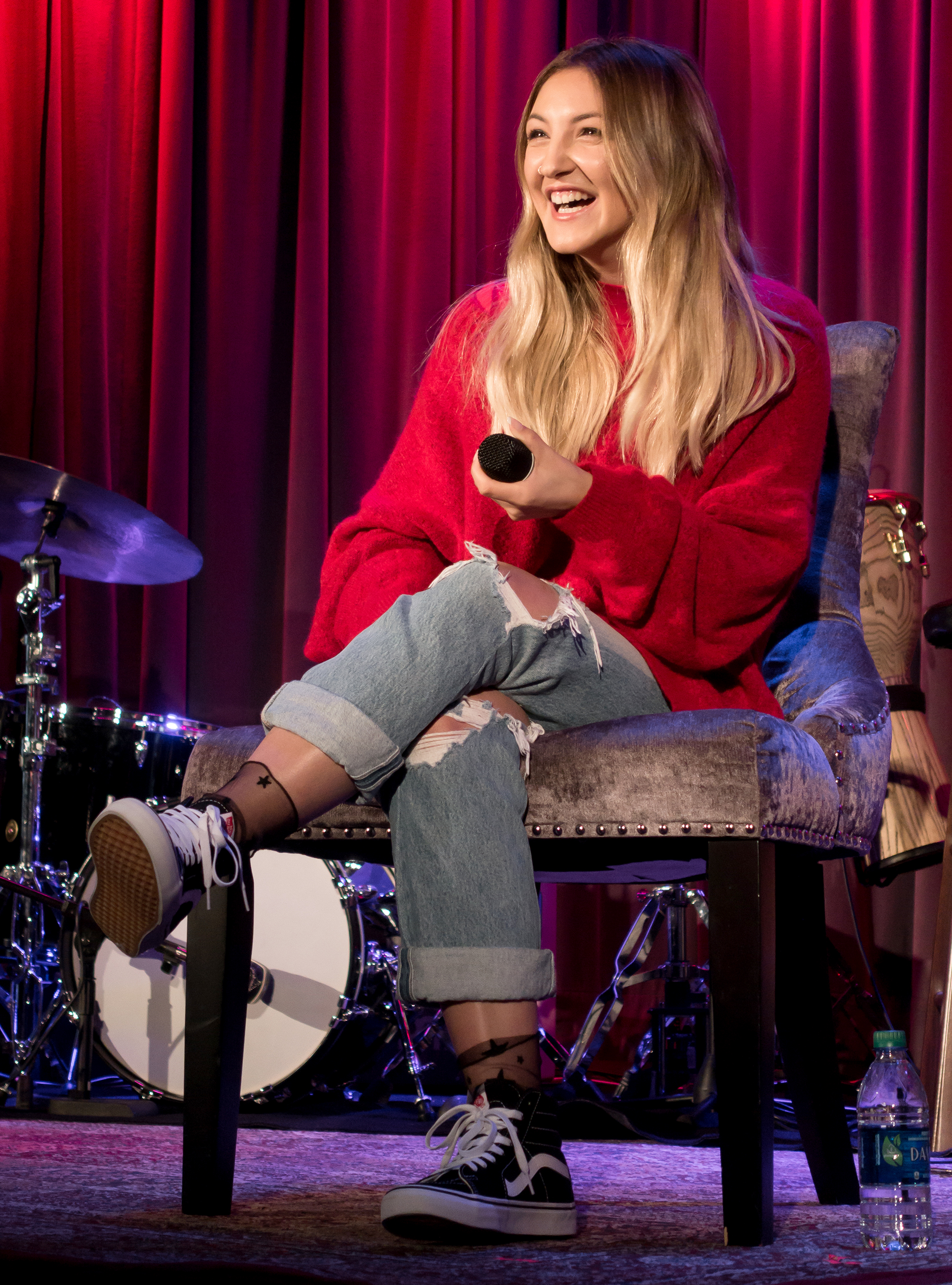
Julia Michaels co-wrote "Pretty Please" and also sang backing vocal harmonies.

For the percussions, Kirkpatrick was inspired by drummer Nate Smith and how he places his hi-hats. The producer described it as "not a triplet, but also not straightforward". It introduced an effect of recurring retardation in the rhythm and gave the song its "push and pull" feel. Kirpatrick used LFO tool on the drums to make them sound quieter and make the sound more about the hit while also softening the transient. The tool also had the purpose of making crowd noise sound like an up-hat in the second verse, which he described as "the coolest idea he's ever had". Kirpatrick also used a clock ticking as a percussion element for almost the entire song. The producer layered the drums, with elements including a little kick and adding a transient to the snare. Kirkpatrick included big whoops in the song as space fillers; he faded the ends to make them sound tight.

Kirkpatrick used his p-bass for the song and edited it substantially. When recording the bass for the first time, he accidentally had it on reverb and decided to leave the instrument in so that some of the notes were in reverb. When editing the bass, the producer wanted to make it tight so there would be silence between notes. He also recorded a sub bass to introduce in the hook and used an OTT compressor to get some music elements across at a low volume. With all his layering, Kirkpatrick's idea was to make the instruments sound like one element albeit with every layer serving a purpose. Towards the end of the session, the collaborators discussed writing a middle eight but decided to have Kirkpatrick make one; he described what he made as "a bunch of shit" and him "trying to be Charlie Puth". In the section, Kirpatrick included a part from Lipa's 2017 single "New Rules", which he himself produced, where she sings "I gotta tell them to myself"; however, that was re-pitched in melodyne.

== Music and lyrics ==
Musically, "Pretty Please" is a midtempo disco-pop, electro-R&B and funk song. It uses futuristic and retro styles employing elements of early 2000s R&B slow jams. The song has a length of 3:14 and is composed in the time signature of 4/4 time and the key of C♯ major, with a tempo of 107 beats for minute. It is constructed in verse–chorus form. The song features a stripped back production driven by a bass that is described as "ultra-thick" thumping and funky. The production also features buoyant cowbell bursts, disco strings, disco and funk guitars, intergalactic choirs and percussions similar to kitchen utensils. Bright synthesizer flashes occasionally appear, that change the song from 1970s-styled disco to late 1990s and early 2000s-styled dance-pop. The instrumental elements weave in and out throughout the song.

"Pretty Please"
A disco-pop, electro-R&B and funk song, "Pretty Please" sees Lipa pleading for stress-relieving sex from her partner. The singer mentioned that although the song sounds chill, its lyrics are the opposite.

"Pretty Please" starts with a skeletal funk sound before different elements and various production tricks appear. Guitar chord stabs are added in the second bridge with lower-mid synthesizers complimenting them. A guitar is added in the third hook that is chopped to match the live bass while beeping sounds are introduced. In the middle eight, a slow build of funk guitars and cowbells push the song to its final chorus. In the final chorus, a clap and a tambourine are introduced. Lipa uses throaty vocals that lean into her deeper range. She starts with giddy, half-rapped vocals before transitioning into sultry whispers. The singer conjures anxiousness and sexual tension in her vocal delivery. Contemporary pitch-modulated vocal effects, chopped up vocals, manipulated vocal breakdowns, echoing chants in the bridge and blissful vocal melodies are used. An effect goes under when Lipa sings "yeah".

The lyrics focus on an essence of intimacy and vulnerability. Lipa noted that although the song sounds chill, the lyrics are the opposite. She stated that she enjoyed playing with sounds and concepts in that way. According to Lipa, the song is about promising someone or oneself to be chill at the beginning of a relationship, but realizing that it goes against their own nature. Lipa thought that the opening lyrics "somewhere in the middle, I think I lied a little" sum up the song's meaning. The song additionally sees Lipa in an emotionally tense moment with her lover, pleading for him to stay as he slows down the whirring of her mind and for stress-relieving sex from him.

== Release and promotion ==
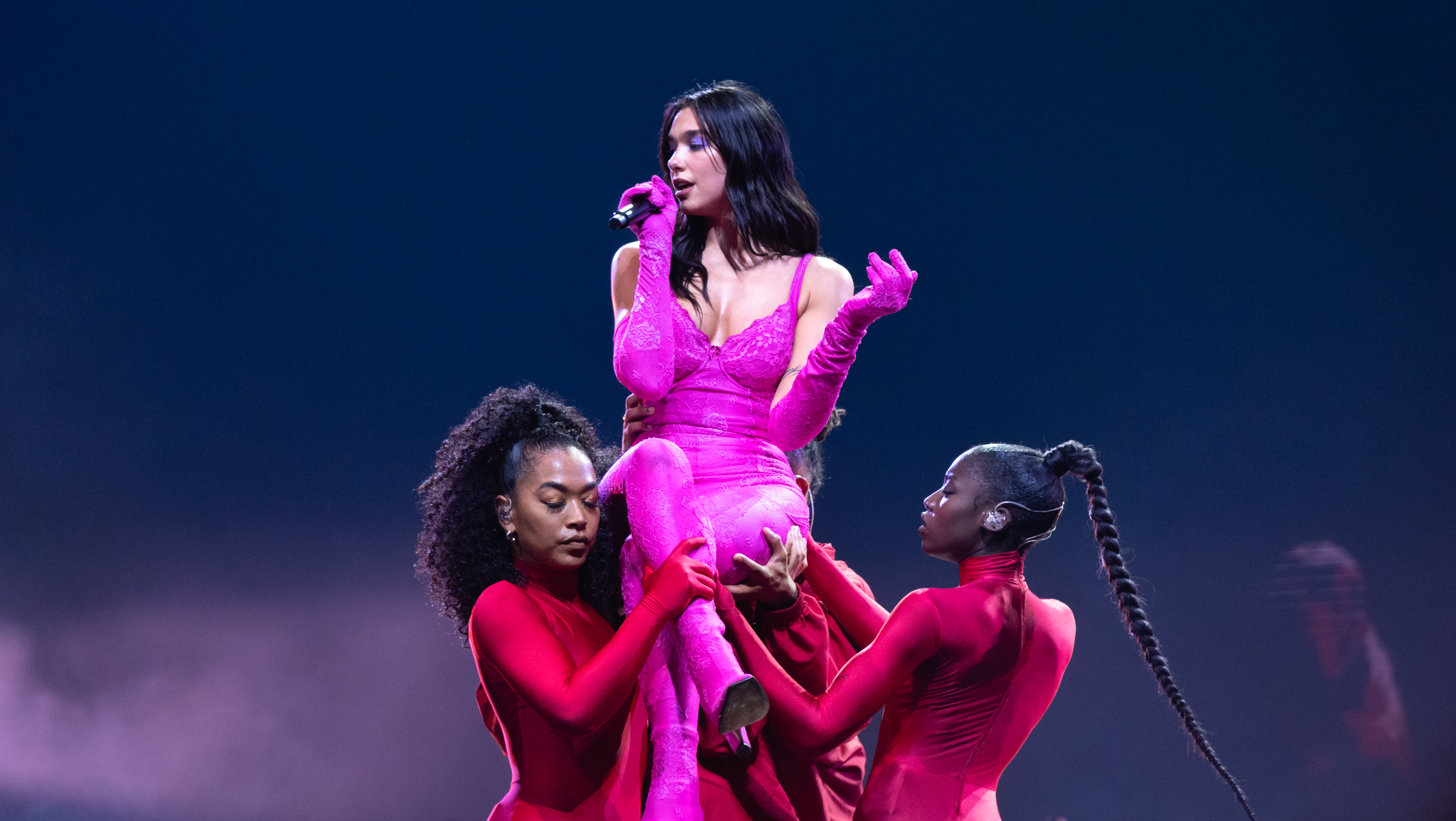
Lipa performing "Pretty Please" on the Future Nostalgia Tour in 2022

"Pretty Please" was released through Warner Records on 27 March 2020 as the sixth track on Lipa's second studio album Future Nostalgia. Lipa decided on placing it towards the middle of the track list due to her thinking that the album needed a slower song to counteract all the other tracks which are very upbeat. A lyric video for the song was released on 9 April 2020. A bleep-house remix by Masters at Work and a soulful remix by Midland were released on Lipa and the Blessed Madonna's DJ Mix-crafted remix album Club Future Nostalgia on 28 August 2020, with the original version of the remixes being released on 11 September. Both remixes also contain elements of 1990s music, UK garage, New York house and contemporary dance-pop.

Lipa performed an acoustic rendition of "Pretty Please" at the virtual FIFA 21 world premiere on 1 October 2020. On 27 November, the singer performed the song at her livestream concert Studio 2054. Lipa performed it during her NPR Tiny Desk Concert on 4 December 2020 and during her performance at the Elton John AIDS Foundation Academy Award Party on 25 April 2021. The song was included in a medley of Future Nostalgia tracks for Lipa's performance at the 2021 Brit Awards. It was included on the setlist of Lipa's 2022 Future Nostalgia Tour. A video of Lipa performing the song at the 2022 Lovestream Festival in Bratislava went viral on social media in June 2022.

== Reception ==
Kitty Empire of The Observer praised "Pretty Please" for being the best track on Future Nostalgia, saying it was "impeccably produced". For The Daily Telegraph, Neil McCormick stated it was "going to have Gaga pulling her pop socks up". In The Wall Street Journal, Mark Richardson compared the song's "seductive airiness" to Prince's music, finding similarities in the use of space, the content of the lyrics as well as the "brilliantly hypnotic pulse". The Face's Nick Levine compared the song to the works of Daft Punk. Nick Smith of musicOMH named it a "spasmodic jam" that echoes "Full Moon" (2002) by Brandy. Writing for Idolator, Mike Nied complimented the song for being "lusty and exceedingly relatable" while also praising the use of a cowbell saying it only makes things better.

For PopMatters, Nick Malone complimented the "airtight" and perfectly timed instrumental of "Pretty Please", specifically the "cosmically perfect" cowbell in the chorus. He also mentioned that the "controlled chaos" of the middle eight elevates the song from "a snappy but muted deep cut to stadium potential". In a separate review for the publication, Evan Sawdey commended Lipa's "striking" vocal performance. Paste's Scott Russell named the song an "alluring dance jam". In Under the Radar, Conrad Duncan compared it to the "slick pop-funk which appears every week on Spotify's New Music Friday playlist" while also complimenting the groove that "snaps and tugs in pleasing directions". Neil Z. Yeung from AllMusic thought the song is for "at the end of the night, when things transition to the bedroom".

For Pitchfork Anna Gaca noted that "Pretty Please" is the closest Future Nostalgia comes to being a "vulnerable or revealing" ballad. Vulture's Craig Jenkins called it a "flurr[y] of pick up lines" that Lipa "knocks out of the park" with her vocal delivery. In USA Today, Patrick Ryan named the song a "shimmering bedroom anthem". Billboard's Bianca Gracie saw the song as "wink-filled". Chris Taylor from The Line of Best Fit called it a "slow burner" that takes one "to a dancefloor right before the lights come up". Bailey Slater of Wonderland labeled the song a "seductive slow burner", insisting that the song's intemporal character became clearer with multiple listenings. Similarly, Daniel Megarry, of the Gay Times, called it "a cute bop that gets better with each listen". Exclaim!'s Brad Garcia named the song "smooth grooving" while Maura Johnston in Entertainment Weekly called it "skeletal".

Hal Kitchen of 25 Years Later named "Pretty Please" one of the best songs of 2020. The Midland "refix" was nominated for Best Remix/Edit at the 2020 DJ Mag Best of British Awards. As an album track on Future Nostalgia, "Pretty Please" charted at number 48 in Lithuania, number 79 in Slovakia and number 101 in Portugal. It also charted at number 70 on the UK Official Audio Streaming Chart. In June 2022, Music Canada awarded the song a gold certification for selling 40,000 track-equivalent units in Canada.

== Track listings ==
- Digital download and streaming – Masters at Work remix
1. "Pretty Please" (Masters at Work remix) – 4:02
- Digital download and streaming – Midland refix
1. "Pretty Please" (Midland refix) – 4:35

The two remixes appear on the 2020 companion remix album Club Future Nostalgia.

== Personnel ==
- Dua Lipa – vocals
- Ian Kirkpatrick – production, engineering, backing vocals, drum programming, guitar, keyboards
- Julia Michaels – backing vocals
- Juan Ariza – additional production
- Josh Gudwin – mixing
- Elijah Marrett-Hitch – mix assisting
- Chris Gehringer – mastering
- Will Quinnell – assistant mastering

== Charts ==
Chart performance for "Pretty Please"
Chart (2020)	Peak position
Lithuania (AGATA)	48
Portugal (AFP)	101
Slovakia Singles Digital (ČNS IFPI)	79
UK Audio Streaming (Official Charts)	70

== Certifications ==
Certifications and sales for "Pretty Please"
Region	Certification	Certified units/sales
Brazil (Pro-Música Brasil)	2× Platinum	80,000^{‡}
Canada (Music Canada)	Platinum	80,000^{‡}
New Zealand (RMNZ)	Gold	15,000^{‡}
Poland (ZPAV)	Gold	25,000^{‡}
Spain (Promusicae)	Gold	30,000^{‡}
United Kingdom (BPI)	Silver	200,000^{‡}
^{‡} Sales+streaming figures based on certification alone.
