= Fenty (fashion house) =

Fashion brand launched by Rihanna

- The logo of Fenty
- Company type: Consumer goods
- Industry: Fashion
- Founded: 2019; 7 years ago
- Founder: Rihanna
- Defunct: 2021
- Headquarters: 24 rue Jean Goujon, Paris, France
- Products: Apparel
- Owner: Rihanna; LVMH
- Parent: LVMH
- Website: fentybeauty.com

Fenty (stylised as FEИTY) was a fashion brand of ready-to-wear founded by Barbadian singer Rihanna under French multinational luxury goods conglomerate LVMH. Fenty was launched in May 2019. The fashion label made Rihanna the first woman and also the first person of colour to head a luxury brand for the LVMH group. Fenty was closed in 2021.

== History ==
=== Establishment ===
On 10 May 2019, Rihanna announced her partnership with LVMH by posting the name and logo of the venture to her social media pages. She also wrote a thankful caption, commending LVMH in working with her: "I couldn't imagine a better partner both creatively and business-wise, and I'm ready for the world to see what we have built together." The chairman and CEO of LVMH, Bernard Arnault said that Rihanna will be supported with a team and resources. He also added: "Everyone knows Rihanna as a wonderful singer, but through our partnership at Fenty Beauty, I discovered a true entrepreneur, a real CEO and a terrific leader."

Fenty was previewed on T: The New York Times Style Magazine, where Rihanna wore several garments and accessories from her first collection. The venture made Rihanna the first woman of colour to lead a house under the LVMH brand, and the first woman to create an original brand for the group. Fenty is the first new producer of clothing, shoes, perfumes and accessories under the LVMH brand since 1987, which follows the seventy LVMH brands, including Louis Vuitton, Givenchy, and Christian Dior.

=== Launch ===
Fenty was initially launched as a pop-up store on 24 May 2019, in Paris. It then opened worldwide as an online store on 29 May. The store took over the first two floors of The Webster in Soho, New York, and was open until 30 June 2019.

The fashion label announced its immediate and indefinite suspension of activities in February 2021.
