= Elton John AIDS Foundation Academy Award Party =

Annual party held after the Academy Awards ceremony

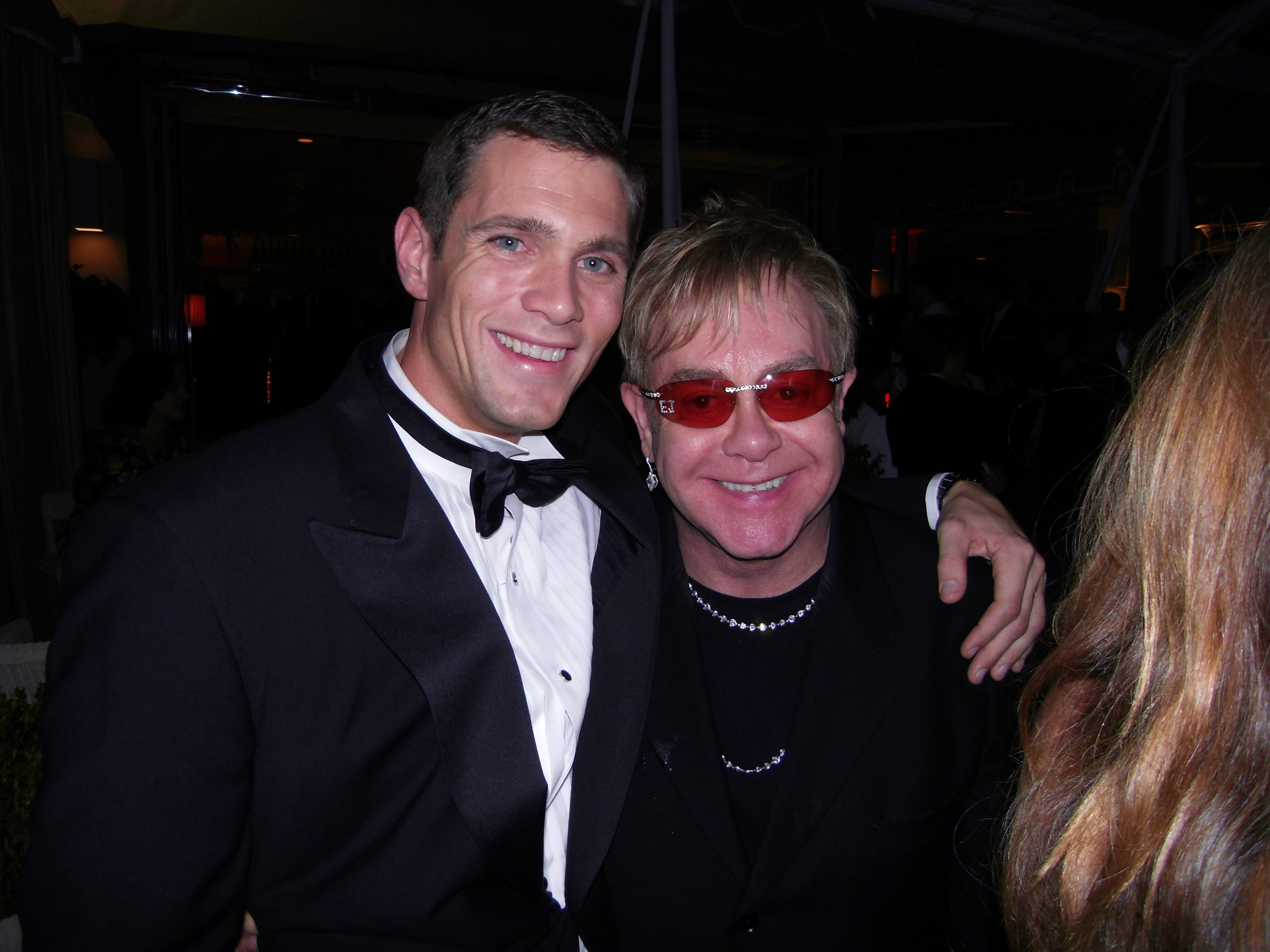
Elton John and Christopher McDaniel at the 2009 Oscar party

The Elton John AIDS Foundation Academy Award Party is one of the annual parties held in Los Angeles following the Academy Awards ceremony the same evening. The first party was held in February 1993 at Maple Drive Restaurant and raised $300,000. It had been produced by Patrick Lippert, an AIDS activist who died of the disease just months later. In recent years it has been held at the Pacific Design Center and was attended by 650 people in 2009. It is hosted by Elton John and the AIDS Foundation, and is one of the most high-profile parties in the Hollywood film industry, particularly for people of British origin working in Hollywood films or the entertainment industry. The annual party contributes to the foundation fund by its high priced ticket sales which are given by invitation only (US$3500 as of 2009) and a celebrity auction. The 2010 party raised over $8 million or £4 million.

Elton John has been quoted as saying that 98% of the proceeds of the party go to the foundation. As of 2026, the event has raised more than US$125 million for the foundation.

== Events ==
Year	Academy Award	Venue	Money raised (USD)	Ref.
1993	65th Academy Awards	Maple Drive Restaurant		
1994	66th Academy Awards	Four Seasons Hotel, Beverly Hills		
1995	67th Academy Awards			
1996	68th Academy Awards			
1997	69th Academy Awards			
1998	70th Academy Awards	Spago restaurant, Beverly Hills		
1999	71st Academy Awards			
2000	72nd Academy Awards	Pagani		
2001	73rd Academy Awards	Moomba restaurant, West Hollywood		
2002	74th Academy Awards	Moomba restaurant, West Hollywood		
2003	75th Academy Awards			
2004	76th Academy Awards			
2005	77th Academy Awards	Pacific Design Center, West Hollywood		
2006	78th Academy Awards	Pacific Design Center, West Hollywood		
2007	79th Academy Awards	Pacific Design Center, West Hollywood		
2008	80th Academy Awards	Pacific Design Center, West Hollywood		
2009	81st Academy Awards	Pacific Design Center, West Hollywood		
2010	82nd Academy Awards	Pacific Design Center, West Hollywood		
2011	83rd Academy Awards	Pacific Design Center, West Hollywood		
2012	84th Academy Awards	West Hollywood Park, West Hollywood		
2013	85th Academy Awards	Pacific Design Center, West Hollywood		
2014	86th Academy Awards	West Hollywood Park, West Hollywood		
2015	87th Academy Awards	West Hollywood Park, West Hollywood		
2016	88th Academy Awards	West Hollywood Park, West Hollywood		
2017	89th Academy Awards	West Hollywood Park, West Hollywood		
2018	90th Academy Awards	West Hollywood Park, West Hollywood		
2019	91st Academy Awards	West Hollywood Park, West Hollywood		
2020	92nd Academy Awards	West Hollywood Park, West Hollywood		
2021	93rd Academy Awards	Worldwide		
2022	94th Academy Awards	West Hollywood Park, West Hollywood	$8.6 million	
2023	95th Academy Awards	West Hollywood Park, West Hollywood	$9 million	
2024	96th Academy Awards	West Hollywood Park, West Hollywood	$10.8 million	
2025	97th Academy Awards	West Hollywood Park, West Hollywood	$8.6 million	
2026	98th Academy Awards	West Hollywood Park, West Hollywood	$10.6 million	
