= Dua Lipa – Live from Mexico =

2026 live album by Dua Lipa

Live album / video by Dua Lipa
- Released: 22 May 2026
- Recorded: 1–5 December 2025
- Venue: Estadio GNP Seguros
- Length: 97:27
- Label: Warner
- Director: Paul Dugdale

Dua Lipa chronology
| Dua Lipa Live from the Royal Albert Hall (2024) | Dua Lipa – Live from Mexico (2026) |

Concert film
- Dua Lipa – Live from Mexico on YouTube

Dua Lipa – Live from Mexico is the second live album by English singer Dua Lipa. Recorded between 1 and 5 December 2025 during the Radical Optimism Tour concerts at Estadio GNP Seguros in Mexico City, it documents the Latin American leg of the tour and features live renditions of songs from Lipa's first three studio albums. The project was issued digitally and on streaming platforms on 22 May 2026 through Warner Records, with CD and vinyl editions following on 5 June 2026. A concert film capturing the full performance premiered on YouTube on 21 May 2026.

== Background and release ==
In December 2024, Dua Lipa released her first live album, which was recorded at the Royal Albert Hall on 17 October of the same year during the ITV1 television special An Evening with Dua Lipa, as a part of the promotion cycle of her third studio album, Radical Optimism (2024). The broadcast was directed by Paul Dugdale, and the accompanying live album, which included a sole guest appearance from Elton John, was released through Warner Records to positive reviews.

Lipa then embarked on the Radical Optimism Tour (2024–2025) to further promote Radical Optimism. Performed in 81 shows across 41 cities, the tour was a commercial success by earning US$141.1 million and being attended by an audience of over 1.2 million from 59 reported dates. The performances at the Estadio GNP Seguros in Mexico City were recorded by Dugdale for the album and video releases, and were announced by Lipa on her social media on 14 May 2026. The concert film was published for free on her YouTube channel on 21 May, while the live album was released to music streaming services and physical formats on 22 May and 5 June, respectively. The album consists of the full twenty-one song set list of the tour, including a cover of "Oye Mi Amor" by Maná featuring Fher Olvera.

== Critical reception ==
Neil Z. Yeung of AllMusic gave the album 4.5 out of 5 stars, praising the accompanying band and the "infectious performance energy from Lipa herself".

== Track listing ==
Dua Lipa – Live from Mexico track listing
| No. | Title | Writer(s) | Length |
|---|---|---|---|
| 1. | "Training Season" | Dua Lipa; Kevin Parker; Danny L Harle; Caroline Ailin; Tobias Jesso Jr.; Nick Gale; Martina Sorbara; Shaun Frank; Yaakov Gruzman; Steve Francis Richard Mastroianni | 3:33 |
| 2. | "End of an Era" | Lipa; Parker; Harle; Ailin; Jesso | 3:25 |
| 3. | "Break My Heart" | Lipa; Andrew Wotman; Ali Tamposi; Stefan Johnson; Jordan K. Johnson; Andrew Farriss; Michael Hutchence | 4:13 |
| 4. | "One Medley" | Adam Wiles; Jessie Reyez; Lipa | 6:20 |
| 5. | "Whatcha Doing" | Lipa; Parker; Harle; Ailin; Tamposi | 4:34 |
| 6. | "Levitating" | Lipa; Clarence Coffee Jr.; Sarah Hudson; Stephen Kozmeniuk | 4:17 |
| 7. | "These Walls" | Lipa; Andrew Wyatt; Harle; Billy Walsh; Ailin | 4:27 |
| 8. | "Oye Mi Amor" (featuring Fher of Maná) | Fher Olvera; Alex González | 5:03 |
| 9. | "Maria" | Lipa; Wyatt; Harle; Julia Michaels; Ailin | 3:38 |
| 10. | "Physical" | Lipa; Jason Evigan; Coffee; Hudson | 5:22 |
| 11. | "Electricity" | Mark Ronson; Thomas Wesley Pentz; Diana Gordon; Romy Madley Croft; Lipa; Philip Meckseper; Jacob Olofsson; Rami Dawod; Maxime Picard; Clément Picard | 4:10 |
| 12. | "Hallucinate" | Lipa; Samuel George Lewis; Sophie Frances Cooke | 3:00 |
| 13. | "Illusion" | Lipa; Parker; Harle; Ailin; Jesso | 4:15 |
| 14. | "Falling Forever" | Lipa; Ian Kirkpatrick; Harle; Emily Warren; Tamposi; Ailin | 4:20 |
| 15. | "Happy for You" | Lipa; Parker; Harle; Ailin; Jesso | 5:08 |
| 16. | "Love Again" | Lipa; Coffee; Kozmeniuk; Chelcee Grimes | 6:34 |
| 17. | "Anything for Love" | Lipa; Kirkpatrick; Harle; Jesso; Michaels; Ailin | 3:35 |
| 18. | "Be the One" | Lucy Taylor; Digital Farm Animals; Jack Tarrant | 8:35 |
| 19. | "New Rules" / "Dance the Night interlude" | Ailin; Warren; Kirkpatrick; Lipa; Mark Ronson; Wyatt; Ailin | 4:51 |
| 20. | "Don't Start Now" | Lipa; Ailin; Warren; Kirkpatrick | 3:56 |
| 21. | "Houdini" | Lipa; Parker; Harle; Ailin; Jesso | 4:11 |
| Total length: | | | 97:27 |

=== Notes ===
- The digital and streaming editions of the album also include the studio versions of the tracks performed on Dua Lipa – Live from Mexico.
- "One Medley" features live interpolations of Todd Terry's 1996 remix of "Keep On Jumpin'" by Musique, as well as "Music Sounds Better with You" by Stardust.

== Personnel ==
Credits are adapted from the concert film's end credits.

- Dua Lipa – vocals, executive producer
- Paul Dugdale – director
- Dukagjin (Dugi) Lipa – executive producer
- Simon Fischer – producer
- Peter Abbott – producer
- Sofia Gold – producer
- James Rhodes – director of photography
- Brett Turnbull – director of photography
- Simon M. Bryant – editor
- James Collett – editor
- Pablo D'Ambrosi – editor
- Tim Woolcott – editor
- Jay Reynolds – music mixing
- Tim Clark – supervisiong sound editor
- William Bowerman – musical direction
- Matthew Carroll – bandleader, bass guitar, additional programming
- Naomi Scarlett – backing vocals
- Ciara O'Connor – backing vocals
- Alexander Lanyon – guitar, backing vocals
- Georgina Ward – keyboards
- Adam Wade – drums
- Sophie Galpin – percussion, guitar, backing vocals
- Charles Monneraud – assistant musical director
- Steve Cowley – additional programming
- William Nicholson – front of house engineering
- Alexander Cerutti – monitor engineering

== Charts ==
Chart performance
| Chart (2026) | Peak position |
|---|---|
| Australian Albums (ARIA) | 68 |
| Belgian Albums (Ultratop Flanders) | 22 |
| Belgian Albums (Ultratop Wallonia) | 5 |
| Croatian International Albums (HDU) | 12 |
| Dutch Albums (Album Top 100) | 91 |
| French Albums (SNEP) | 13 |
| German Albums (Offizielle Top 100) | 97 |
| Hungarian Albums (MAHASZ) | 15 |
| Irish Albums (Official Charts) | 13 |
| Italian Vinyl Albums (FIMI) | 20 |
| Polish Physical Albums (ZPAV) | 23 |
| Scottish Albums (Official Charts) | 14 |
| Spanish Albums (Promusicae) | 54 |
| UK Albums (Official Charts) | 14 |

== Release history ==
Release history
| Region | Date | Format | Label | Ref. |
|---|---|---|---|---|
| Various | 22 May 2026 | Digital download; streaming | Warner | |
| Various | 5 June 2026 | CD; vinyl | Warner | |
