= List of artists who reached number one on the Hot Dance/Electronic Songs =

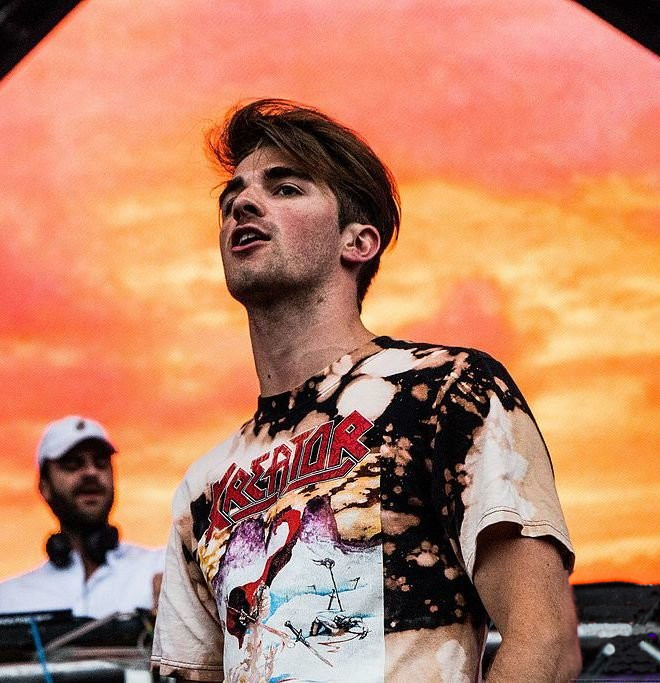
The Chainsmokers has charted a record six number ones on the Hot Dance/Electronic Songs.

The Hot Dance/Electronic Songs is a weekly music chart compiled by Billboard, ranking the most popular dance and electronic songs in the United States. The chart was inaugurated in January 2013 as a result of the rise in popularity of the genres. The chart is published weekly and songs are ranked according to airplay impressions and volume of streams, sales and dance club spins, and tracked by Nielsen SoundScan, Nielsen BDS, BDS from streaming services including Spotify and Xbox Music, and from a United States-wide select panel of 140 DJs. The chart was revamped in January 2025 to focus on songs primarily recorded by DJs or producers, with an emphasis on electronic-based production. As a result, the Hot Dance/Pop Songs chart was created to compile songs with "dance-centric vocals, melody, and hooks by artists not rooted in the dance genre".

A total of 72 artists have topped the Hot Dance/Electronic Songs chart since its inception. The Chainsmokers are the artist with the most number ones with six songs, from "#Selfie" (2014) to "Something Just Like This" (2017). They also topped the Hot Dance/Electronic Songs Year-End chart twice, with "Don't Let Me Down" in 2016 and "Something Just Like This" in 2017. Calvin Harris, Zedd, and Marshmello tied as the solo artist with the most number ones on the chart, with four apiece. Harris' chart-toppers spanned from "Summer" (2014) to "Feels" (2017), while Zedd's ones started from "Break Free" (2014) to "The Middle" (2018). Marshmello stayed at the top of the chart for 143 cumulative weeks, the most of any other act, from "Wolves" (2017) to "Miles on It" (2024). His song "Happier" (2018) also became the longest-running number one on the chart, with 69 non-consecutive weeks.

Lady Gaga, Ariana Grande, and Dua Lipa tied as the female artist with the most number ones on the Hot Dance/Electronic Songs chart, with three songs each. Gaga's chart-toppers ranged from "Applause" (2013) to "Rain on Me" (2020); Grande's ones from "Break Free" (2014) to "Yes, And?" (2024); Lipa's ones from "Cold Heart (Pnau remix)" (2021) to "Illusion" (2024). However, since the creation of the Hot Dance/Pop Songs chart in 2025, none of these women are eligible to enter the Hot Dance/Electronic Songs chart anymore, unless they are featured on songs by electronic music producers or DJs. Gaga continued topping the Hot Dance/Pop Songs, with "Abracadabra" staying atop the chart for 18 non-consecutive weeks.

== Artists by total of number ones ==
Key
‡	Indicates year-end number-one song

Total	Artist	Song	Peak date	Weeks at number one	Ref.
6	The Chainsmokers	"#Selfie"	March 29, 2014	2	
6	The Chainsmokers	"Roses" (The Chainsmokers featuring Rozes)	January 9, 2016	14	
6	The Chainsmokers	"Don't Let Me Down" (The Chainsmokers featuring Daya) ‡	May 7, 2016	12	
6	The Chainsmokers	"Closer" (The Chainsmokers featuring Halsey)	September 3, 2016	27	
6	The Chainsmokers	"Paris"	March 11, 2017	2	
6	The Chainsmokers	"Something Just like This" (The Chainsmokers and Coldplay) ‡	March 18, 2017	25	
4	Calvin Harris	"Summer"	July 5, 2014	4	
4	Calvin Harris	"Blame" (Calvin Harris featuring John Newman)	November 22, 2014	1	
4	Calvin Harris	"This Is What You Came For" (Calvin Harris featuring Rihanna)	July 30, 2016	3	
4	Calvin Harris	"Feels" (Calvin Harris featuring Pharrell Williams, Katy Perry and Big Sean)	September 9, 2017	3	
4	Zedd	"Break Free" (Ariana Grande featuring Zedd)	August 30, 2014	9	
4	Zedd	"I Want You to Know" (Zedd featuring Selena Gomez)	March 14, 2015	6	
4	Zedd	"Stay" (Zedd and Alessia Cara)	May 6, 2017	7	
4	Zedd	"The Middle" (Zedd, Maren Morris and Grey) ‡	February 10, 2018	33	
4	Marshmello	"Wolves" (Selena Gomez and Marshmello)	November 18, 2017	11	
4	Marshmello	"Silence" (Marshmello featuring Khalid)	December 2, 2017	1	
4	Marshmello	"Happier" (Marshmello and Bastille) ‡	September 29, 2018	69	
4	Marshmello	"Miles on It" (Marshmello and Kane Brown) ‡	May 18, 2024	62	
3	Lady Gaga	"Applause"	August 31, 2013	3	
3	Lady Gaga	"Stupid Love"	March 14, 2020	3	
3	Lady Gaga	"Rain on Me" (Lady Gaga and Ariana Grande)	June 6, 2020	2	
3	Ariana Grande	"Break Free" (Ariana Grande featuring Zedd)	August 30, 2014	9	
3	Ariana Grande	"Rain on Me" (Lady Gaga and Ariana Grande)	June 6, 2020	2	
3	Ariana Grande	"Yes, And?"	January 27, 2024	6	
3	Dua Lipa	"Cold Heart (Pnau remix)" (Elton John and Dua Lipa) ‡	October 23, 2021	36	
3	Dua Lipa	"Houdini" ‡	November 25, 2023	17	
3	Dua Lipa	"Illusion"	April 27, 2024	2	
2	Avicii	"Wake Me Up"	September 21, 2013	26	
2	Avicii	"Hey Brother"	March 22, 2014	1	
2	DJ Snake	"Turn Down for What" (DJ Snake and Lil Jon) ‡	April 12, 2014	12	
2	DJ Snake	"Lean On" (Major Lazer and DJ Snake featuring MØ) ‡	August 1, 2015	23	
2	Justin Bieber	"Where Are Ü Now" (Jack Ü and Justin Bieber)	July 18, 2015	2	
2	Justin Bieber	"Cold Water" (Major Lazer featuring Justin Bieber and MØ)	August 13, 2016	2	
2	Major Lazer	"Lean On" (Major Lazer and DJ Snake featuring MØ) ‡	August 1, 2015	23	
2	Major Lazer	"Cold Water" (Major Lazer featuring Justin Bieber and MØ)	August 13, 2016	2	
2	MØ	"Lean On" (Major Lazer and DJ Snake featuring MØ) ‡	August 1, 2015	23	
2	MØ	"Cold Water" (Major Lazer featuring Justin Bieber and MØ)	August 13, 2016	2	
2	Pharrell Williams	"Get Lucky" (Daft Punk featuring Pharrell Williams)	June 1, 2013	13	
2	Pharrell Williams	"Feels" (Calvin Harris featuring Pharrell Williams, Katy Perry and Big Sean)	September 9, 2017	3	
2	Selena Gomez	"I Want You to Know" (Zedd featuring Selena Gomez)	March 14, 2015	6	
2	Selena Gomez	"Wolves" (Selena Gomez and Marshmello)	November 18, 2017	11	
2	Britney Spears	"Scream & Shout" (will.i.am and Britney Spears)	January 26, 2013	5	
2	Britney Spears	"Hold Me Closer" (Elton John and Britney Spears)	September 10, 2022	1	
2	Elton John	"Cold Heart (Pnau remix)" (Elton John and Dua Lipa) ‡	October 23, 2021	36	
2	Elton John	"Hold Me Closer" (Elton John and Britney Spears)	September 10, 2022	1	
2	David Guetta	"Hey Mama" (David Guetta featuring Nicki Minaj, Bebe Rexha and Afrojack)	May 2, 2015	11	
2	David Guetta	"I'm Good (Blue)" (David Guetta and Bebe Rexha) ‡	October 1, 2022	55	
2	Bebe Rexha	"Hey Mama" (David Guetta featuring Nicki Minaj, Bebe Rexha and Afrojack)	May 2, 2015	11	
2	Bebe Rexha	"I'm Good (Blue)" (David Guetta and Bebe Rexha) ‡	October 1, 2022	55	
2	Charli XCX	"I Love It" (Icona Pop featuring Charli XCX)	May 18, 2013	2	
2	Charli XCX	"Guess" (Charli XCX featuring Billie Eilish)	August 17, 2024	1	
1	will.i.am	"Scream & Shout" (will.i.am and Britney Spears)	January 26, 2013	5	
1	Baauer	"Harlem Shake" ‡	March 2, 2013	8	
1	Pitbull	"Feel This Moment" (Pitbull featuring Christina Aguilera)	April 27, 2013	2	
1	Christina Aguilera	"Feel This Moment" (Pitbull featuring Christina Aguilera)	April 27, 2013	2	
1	Psy	"Gentleman"	May 4, 2013	1	
1	Icona Pop	"I Love It" (Icona Pop featuring Charli XCX)	May 18, 2013	2	
1	Daft Punk	"Get Lucky" (Daft Punk featuring Pharrell Williams)	June 1, 2013	13	
1	Lil Jon	"Turn Down for What" (DJ Snake and Lil Jon) ‡	April 12, 2014	12	
1	Disclosure	"Latch" (Disclosure featuring Sam Smith)	August 2, 2014	4	
1	Sam Smith	"Latch" (Disclosure featuring Sam Smith)	August 2, 2014	4	
1	Clean Bandit	"Rather Be" (Clean Bandit featuring Jess Glynne)	November 1, 2014	3	
1	Jess Glynne	"Rather Be" (Clean Bandit featuring Jess Glynne)	November 1, 2014	3	
1	John Newman	"Blame" (Calvin Harris featuring John Newman)	November 22, 2014	1	
1	Mr. Probz	"Waves"	November 29, 2014	11	
1	Lilly Wood and the Prick	"Prayer in C" (Lilly Wood and the Prick and Robin Schulz)	February 14, 2015	5	
1	Robin Schulz	"Prayer in C" (Lilly Wood and the Prick and Robin Schulz)	February 14, 2015	5	
1	Nicki Minaj	"Hey Mama" (David Guetta featuring Nicki Minaj, Bebe Rexha and Afrojack)	May 2, 2015	11	
1	Afrojack	"Hey Mama" (David Guetta featuring Nicki Minaj, Bebe Rexha and Afrojack)	May 2, 2015	11	
1	Jack Ü	"Where Are Ü Now" (Jack Ü and Justin Bieber)	July 18, 2015	2	
1	Rozes	"Roses" (The Chainsmokers featuring Rozes)	January 9, 2016	14	
1	Zara Larsson	"Never Forget You" (Zara Larsson and MNEK)	April 16, 2016	3	
1	MNEK	"Never Forget You" (Zara Larsson and MNEK)	April 16, 2016	3	
1	Daya	"Don't Let Me Down" (The Chainsmokers featuring Daya) ‡	May 7, 2016	12	
1	Rihanna	"This Is What You Came For" (Calvin Harris featuring Rihanna)	July 30, 2016	3	
1	Halsey	"Closer" (The Chainsmokers featuring Halsey)	September 3, 2016	27	
1	Coldplay	"Something Just like This" (The Chainsmokers and Coldplay) ‡	March 18, 2017	25	
1	Alessia Cara	"Stay" (Zedd and Alessia Cara)	May 6, 2017	7	
1	Katy Perry	"Feels" (Calvin Harris featuring Pharrell Williams, Katy Perry and Big Sean)	September 9, 2017	3	
1	Big Sean	"Feels" (Calvin Harris featuring Pharrell Williams, Katy Perry and Big Sean)	September 9, 2017	3	
1	Khalid	"Silence" (Marshmello featuring Khalid)	December 2, 2017	1	
1	Maren Morris	"The Middle" (Zedd, Maren Morris and Grey) ‡	February 10, 2018	33	
1	Grey	"The Middle" (Zedd, Maren Morris and Grey) ‡	February 10, 2018	33	
1	Bastille	"Happier" (Marshmello and Bastille) ‡	September 29, 2018	69	
1	The Black Eyed Peas	"Ritmo (Bad Boys for Life)" (The Black Eyed Peas and J Balvin)	January 25, 2020	10	
1	J Balvin	"Ritmo (Bad Boys for Life)" (The Black Eyed Peas and J Balvin)	January 25, 2020	10	
1	Saint Jhn	"Roses" ‡	June 20, 2020	23	
1	Surf Mesa	"ily (i love you baby)" (Surf Mesa featuring Emilee)	October 10, 2020	17	
1	Emilee	"ily (i love you baby)" (Surf Mesa featuring Emilee)	October 10, 2020	17	
1	Travis Scott	"Goosebumps" (Travis Scott and Hvme) ‡	February 13, 2021	19	
1	Hvme	"Goosebumps" (Travis Scott and Hvme) ‡	February 13, 2021	19	
1	Regard	"You" (Regard, Troye Sivan and Tate McRae)	June 26, 2021	8	
1	Troye Sivan	"You" (Regard, Troye Sivan and Tate McRae)	June 26, 2021	8	
1	Tate McRae	"You" (Regard, Troye Sivan and Tate McRae)	June 26, 2021	8	
1	Farruko	"Pepas"	August 21, 2021	9	
1	Drake	"Falling Back"	July 2, 2022	1	
1	Beyoncé	"Break My Soul"	July 9, 2022	11	
1	Kenya Grace	"Strangers"	October 21, 2023	5	
1	Kane Brown	"Miles on It" (Marshmello and Kane Brown) ‡	May 18, 2024	62	
1	Billie Eilish	"Guess" (Charli XCX featuring Billie Eilish)	August 17, 2024	1	
1	Disco Lines	"No Broke Boys" (Disco Lines and Tinashe)	August 2, 2025	24	
1	Tinashe	"No Broke Boys" (Disco Lines and Tinashe)	August 2, 2025	24	
1	Tame Impala	"Dracula" (Tame Impala and Jennie)	November 1, 2025	44	
1	Jennie	"Dracula" (Tame Impala and Jennie)	November 1, 2025	39 (Note: Jennie was not credited on the song's first five weeks at number one.)	

== See also ==
- List of artists who reached number one on the U.S. Dance Club Songs chart
- List of artists who reached number one on the U.S. dance airplay chart
