= Pierre de Maere =

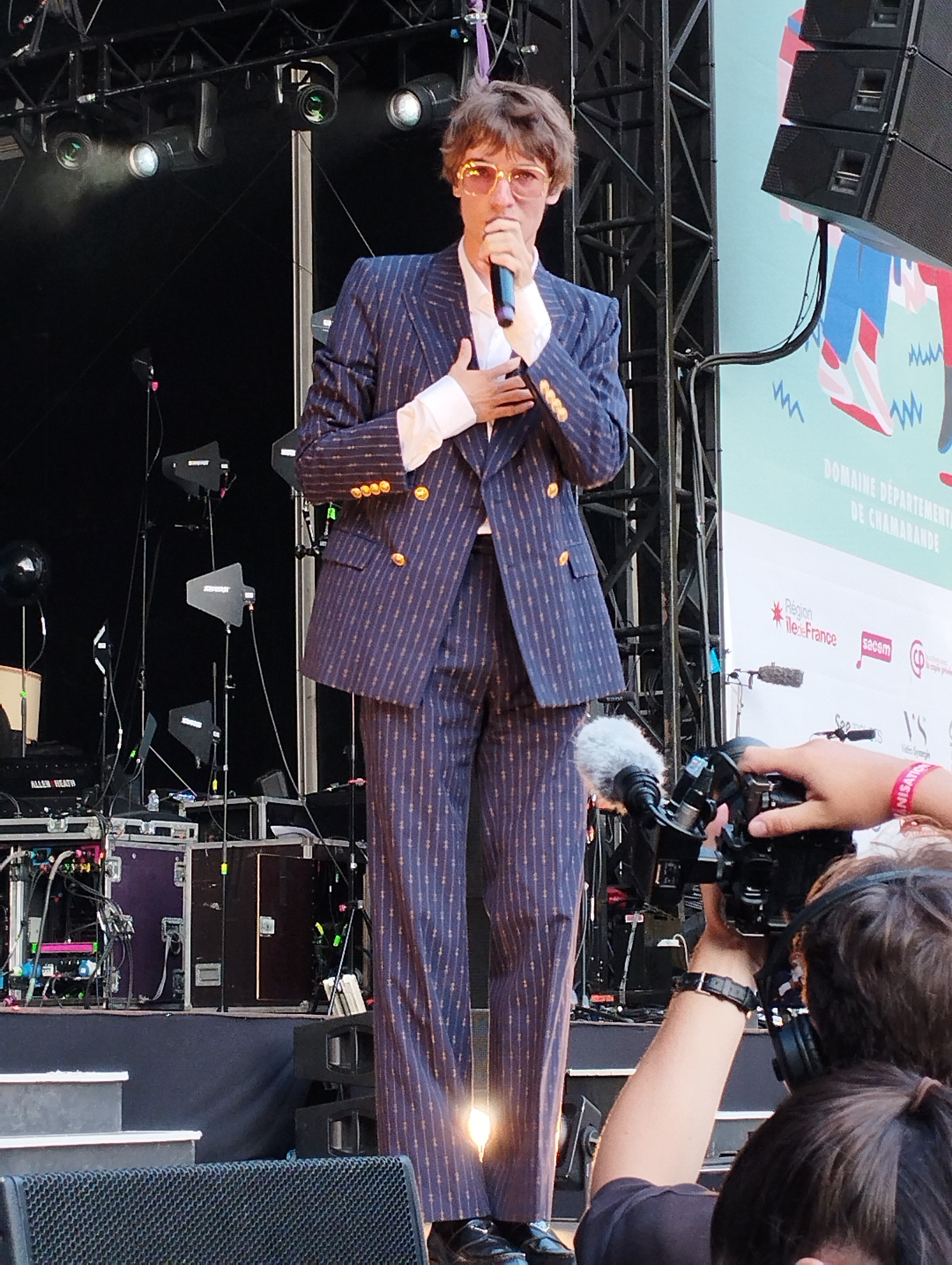
- de Maere in 2023

Background information
- Born: 24 May 2001 (age 25); Uccle, Belgium
- Genre: Pop
- Occupations: Singer, songwriter, record producer
- Instrument: Vocals
- Years active: 2020–present
- Label: Cinq7

Pierre de Maere (French pronunciation: [maʁ]; born 24 May 2001) is a Belgian singer-songwriter.

His single "Un jour je marierai un ange" reached the top 5 of the French-speaking Ultratop 50 Singles and the top 10 of the French national ranking in 2022, obtaining a diamond disc from the SNEP in 2023. After winning the prize for Belgian Revelation of the Year at the NRJ Music Awards in 2022, he received a Victoire de la Musique in 2023 in the category of Male Revelation of the Year.

In November 2024, he and Dua Lipa released the remix of the song "These Walls".

De Maere is openly gay; French magazine Têtu classified him as a queer artist in 2022; in response, he told Le Monde, "I prefer the word flamboyant to the word queer."

== Discography ==
=== Studio albums ===
| Title | Album details | Peak chart positions | | | Certifications |
| Title | Album details | BEL (Wa) | BEL (Fl) | FRA | Certifications |
|---|---|---|---|---|---|
| Regarde-moi | Released: 27 January 2023; Label: Cinq7; Format: LP, CD, digital download, streaming | 1 | — | 5 | SNEP: Platinum |
| Ave de Maere | Released: 25 September 2026; Label: Cinq7; Format: LP, CD, digital download, streaming | 1 | 39 | 11 | |

=== EPs ===
| Title | EP details | Peak chart positions | |
| Title | EP details | BEL (Wa) | FRA |
|---|---|---|---|
| Un jour, je | Released: 21 January 2022; Label: Cinq7; Format: EP, CD, digital download, streaming | 30 | 100 |

=== Singles ===
| Title | Year | Peak chart positions | | | Certifications | Album |
| Title | Year | BEL (Wa) | FRA | NZ Hot | Certifications | Album |
|---|---|---|---|---|---|---|
| "Judas" | 2019 | — | — | — | | Non-album singles |
| "Potins absurdes" | 2020 | — | — | — | | Non-album singles |
| "Regrets" | 2021 | — | — | — | | Un jour, je |
| "Menteur" | 2021 | — | — | — | | Un jour, je |
| "Un jour je marierai un ange" | 2021 | 4 | 9 | — | SNEP: Diamond | Un jour, je |
| "Roméo" | 2022 | — | — | — | | Regarde-moi |
| "Les oiseaux" | 2022 | — | — | — | | Regarde-moi |
| "Enfant de" | 2023 | 3 | 144 | — | SNEP: Platinum | Regarde-moi |
| "Mercredi" | 2023 | 15 | — | — | | Regarde-moi |
| "These Walls" (Dua Lipa featuring Pierre de Maere) | 2024 | 11 | 74 | 36 | SNEP: Platinum | Radical Optimism |
| "Je pense à vous" | 2026 | 3 | — | — | | Ave de Maere |
| "Opinel" | 2026 | 12 | — | — | | Ave de Maere |
