= Radical Optimism =

- Standard cover

Studio album by Dua Lipa
- Released: 3 May 2024
- Recorded: June 2022 – July 2023
- Studios: London (5dB Studios); Malibu (Woodshed Recording); Los Angeles (Westlake); Kevin Parker's Home Studio; NRG Recording Studios
- Genres: Dance-pop; electropop; Europop; neo-psychedelia
- Length: 36:35
- Label: Warner
- Producers: Danny L Harle; Ian Kirkpatrick; Kevin Parker; Andrew Wyatt

Dua Lipa chronology
Club Future Nostalgia (2020)	Radical Optimism (2024)	Dua Lipa Live from the Royal Albert Hall (2024)

Singles from Radical Optimism
- 1. "Houdini" Released: 9 November 2023; 2. "Training Season" Released: 15 February 2024; 3. "Illusion" Released: 11 April 2024; 4. "End of an Era" Released: 30 May 2025

Radical Optimism is the third studio album by English singer Dua Lipa. It was released on 3 May 2024 through Warner Records. Her first full-length album in four years since Future Nostalgia (2020), Radical Optimism was produced by Tame Impala founder Kevin Parker, Danny L Harle, Ian Kirkpatrick, and Andrew Wyatt. The album was supported by four singles, "Houdini", "Training Season", "Illusion", and "End of an Era", with the first three peaked within the top 10 of the UK Singles Chart and the top 15 of the Billboard Global 200.

Upon release, Radical Optimism received generally positive reviews from critics. Some reviewers praised its neo-psychedelic production, while others found the album underwhelming and inferior to Future Nostalgia. In the United Kingdom, the album debuted atop the UK Albums Chart and scored the biggest opening week for a British female in three years. In the United States, it secured Lipa's highest first-week sales and became her highest-charting album on the Billboard 200. Radical Optimism was supported by the Radical Optimism Tour, which spanned from November 2024 to December 2025.

== Background ==
Dua Lipa's second album, Future Nostalgia, was released in March 2020 to widespread acclaim. Credited as a significant factor in the revival of disco and dance-pop music in this decade, the record yielded multiple singles including "Don't Start Now" and the RIAA Diamond-certified "Levitating". It won Best Pop Vocal Album and British Album of the Year at the 2021 Grammy Awards and Brit Awards ceremonies, respectively. Future Nostalgia was succeeded by a remix album and reissue. Lipa embarked on its namesake tour, which included 91 shows across the Americas, Europe, and Oceania, from February to November 2022.

In 2023, Lipa revealed her third album would be released sometime in 2024 with a new sound that sees her moving away from the disco soundscape of Future Nostalgia; instead embracing more of 1970s-era psychedelia. After having deleted all of her Instagram posts in October 2023, she revealed she had gotten her hair coloured red via a picture of herself captioned "miss me?". In anticipation of new music, Lipa posted pictures to her social media with cryptic captions and temporarily replaced the cover art of her previous albums with kaleidoscopic versions on streaming services. In the cover story for the February 2024 issue of Rolling Stone, Lipa described her forthcoming album as a "psychedelic-pop-infused tribute to UK rave culture". Lipa announced her third album, titled Radical Optimism, and its release date, via an Instagram livestream on 13 March 2024.

== Music and lyrics ==
Radical Optimism is a dance-pop, neo-psychedelia, electropop, and Europop record. It also contains elements of soft rock and eurodance. The album "taps into the pure joy and happiness" of having clarity in situations, including "hard goodbyes and vulnerable beginnings" that eventually turned out to be milestones as a result of choosing optimism and grace to navigate "through the chaos". The album is inspired by "the energy of [Lipa's hometown] London, and the rawness, honesty, confidence and freedom of 90s Britpop". In a press release, she expressed her desire to "capture the essence of youth and freedom and having fun" with the record. The concept of radical optimism was introduced to her by a friend a few years prior, which resonated with her and allowed it to "weave" into her life. Inspired by the term, Lipa found herself doing research on the history of "psychedelia, trip hop, and Britpop". The concept turned out to be a "confidently optimistic" feeling to the singer that she sought to incorporate in her recording sessions.

== Release and promotion ==
Lipa unveiled the album's cover, title and track-list on 13 March 2024, and made it available for pre-order. According to Lipa, the title Radical Optimism was inspired by "the idea of going through chaos gracefully and feeling like you can weather any storm". The artwork of the album was unveiled along with its announcement. Shot by Tyrone Lebon, it depicts the singer floating in an ocean and the fin of a nearby shark seemingly approaching her. Radical Optimism was released through Warner Records on 3 May 2024, and was made available through streaming, digital download, cassette, CD, and vinyl LP variants.

=== Singles ===
The lead single "Houdini" was released on 9 November 2023, with its accompanying music video. The song topped the charts in Belgium, Bulgaria, and Greece; reached number two in the UK, the top-ten in various countries, and number 11 in the US. It also topped the Billboard Dance/Electronic Songs chart for seventeen weeks, becoming her second-longest-running number-one on the chart. An extended edit of the song was released on digital and streaming services on 1 December followed by remixes by Adam Port and Danny L Harle, one of the track's producers, on 22 December 2023 and 19 January 2024 respectively.

The second single "Training Season" was debuted live at the 66th Annual Grammy Awards on 4 February 2024 before being released on 15 February. It was issued on limited 7-inch vinyl, CD, and cassette formats in addition to accompanying instrumental, a-capella, extended, and extended instrumental versions on digital and streaming platforms. The song's music video, directed by Vincent Hancock, was released alongside the track. The single debuted at number four in the UK, six in Ireland, 10 in New Zealand, 11 in Canada, 27 in the US, and within the top 40 in various other countries. An acoustic version of the song was released on digital and streaming services on 22 March 2024, followed by a remix by Chloé Caillet on 29 March.

"Illusion" was released as the album's third single on 11 April 2024. Accompanying instrumental, a capella, and extended versions were released the same day on digital and streaming services. The song debuted at number nine in the UK, becoming the album's third consecutive top 10 entry, and within the top 40 in various other countries. The track also reached the summit of the US Dance/Electronic Songs chart, becoming the second single from the album to reach the peak there. The song's accompanying music video drew comparisons to Kylie Minogue's video for her 2003 single "Slow".

The fourth single, "End of an Era" impacted a radio airplay in Italy on 30 May 2025, in anticipation of Lipa's performance on I-Days Milano.

=== Live performances ===
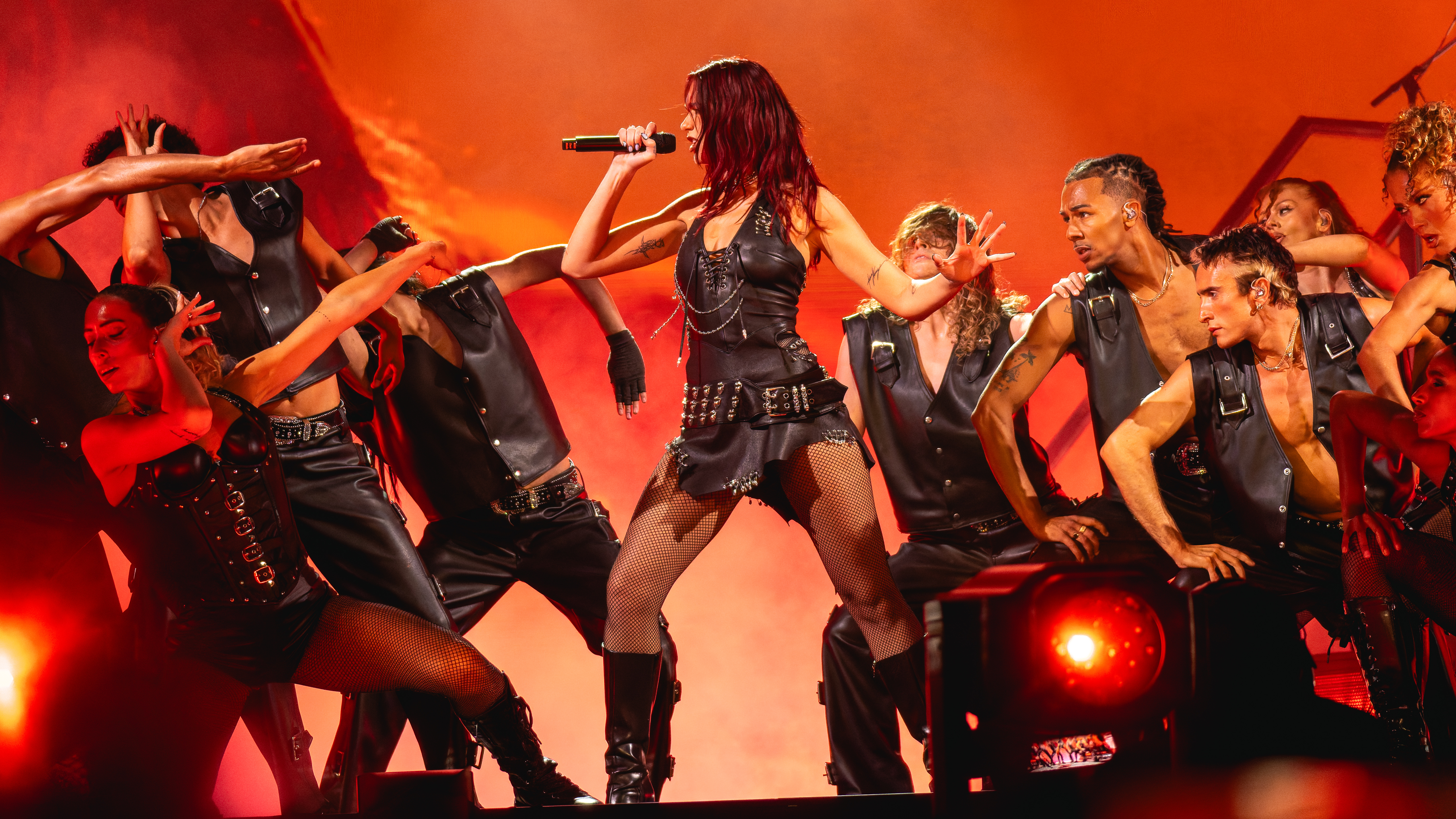
Dua Lipa performing at the 2024 Glastonbury Festival

As part of promotion for the album, Lipa performed the album's singles at various venues across various media forms. Performances of "Houdini" and "Training Season" filmed in a London warehouse were released to YouTube on 12 January 2024 and 15 March, respectively. The performances, subtitled "London Sessions", were also released in audio form on digital and streaming services on the same day as their respective debuts. Lipa opened the 66th Annual Grammy Awards on 4 February 2024 with "Houdini" and debuted then-unreleased "Training Season", along with "Dance the Night", a song for the 2023 film Barbie. She performed "Training Season" again at the Brit Awards 2024 ceremony on 2 March. On 12 April, Lipa performed a private concert at a McDonald's convention in Barcelona. Her setlist at the event consisted of the album's first two singles alongside several other songs from her catalogue.

Lipa recorded a performance for BBC Radio 1's Live Lounge series at Maida Vale Studios that aired on BBC One on 6 May 2024. Her performance included "Training Season", "Illusion" and "Happy for You" from Radical Optimism in addition to her 2015 single, "Be the One", and a cover of Cleo Sol's 2021 track "Sunshine". On 25 April, she performed the first three singles off of the album at Time magazine's 2024 100 Gala. The event aired on the ABC network on 12 May. On 4 May, a day after the album's release, Lipa hosted Saturday Night Live and performed "Illusion" and "Happy for You" during the show. The next day, she performed the same two songs again alongside "Houdini" and "Training Season" during a surprise concert in Times Square in New York City.

Lipa headlined the 2024 edition of Glastonbury Festival in June as well as Open'er Festival, Rock Werchter, NOS Alive, and Mad Cool in July. She also conducted a one-off concert on 17 October at the Royal Albert Hall in London, which was released as her first live album, Dua Lipa Live from the Royal Albert Hall, on 6 December 2024. Fans who pre-ordered Radical Optimism were granted pre-sale access to the concert on 10 April, followed by the general ticket sale two days later, via Ticketmaster.

=== Tour ===
On 18 March 2024, Lipa announced the Radical Optimism Tour, a concert tour in support of the album. Tickets went on general sale on 21 March via Ticketmaster; fans who pre-ordered Radical Optimism were granted pre-sale access. The tour began on 5 November 2024 in Singapore, and concluded on 5 December 2025 in Mexico City, grossing $141.1 million from 59 reported shows. The Mexico City shows were professionally recorded and resulted in the concert film Dua Lipa - Live from Mexico, which was released to YouTube on 21 May 2026. The live album, Live from Mexico, was released the following day for streaming and digital download, with a CD and vinyl release in June 2026.

== Critical reception ==
Professional ratings
Aggregate scores
Source	Rating
AnyDecentMusic?	6.6/10
Metacritic	73/100
Review scores
Source	Rating
AllMusic	4/5 stars
The Daily Telegraph	4/5 stars
Dork	4/5 stars
The Guardian	3/5 stars
The Independent	5/5 stars
NME	3/5 stars
The Observer	4/5 stars
Pitchfork	6.6/10
Rolling Stone UK	3/5 stars
Slant Magazine	4/5 stars

Radical Optimism received generally favourable reviews from music critics. At Metacritic, which assigns a normalised rating out of 100 to reviews from mainstream publications, the album received an average score of 73, based on 21 reviews. Very few publications, including Billboard, PopMatters, and Slant Magazine, listed Radical Optimism as one of the best albums of 2024.

Writing for Evening Standard, El Hunt says that "Radical Optimism, despite having a title that sounds like an inspirational fridge magnet, boasts some real dance-pop gems which belong right at the top of her output", but adds that it's a "slightly half-hearted experiment". For the Financial Times, Ludovic Hunter-Tilney noted that "there's a lot of production layering and effects, but the songs share a similarly straightforward groove". Aimee Phillips of Clash lamented "I can't see Radical Optimism sliding in straight to number one in fans' affections, but if the slow-burn of Future Nostalgia is anything to go by, Dua Lipa would have grounds to be, as her latest project suggests, radically optimistic about the album's future". DIY writer Lisa Wright remarked that "on her hugely-anticipated third, there's plenty of sun-drenched sonic optimism but not so much that's all that radical".

Year-end rankings
Source	Rank
Billboard	27
musicOMH	42
PopMatters	49
Slant Magazine	40

Radical Optimism has also received some mixed reviews. In The Line of Best Fit, Claire Biddles said "In her [Dua's] dance-pop singles, she's proven that she can do the "pop" part, but the "star" is still lacking". Writing for NME, Thomas Smith wrote that "perhaps it's unfair to hold Lipa too strongly against what might have been a throwaway comment in a profile too literally, but Radical Optimism offers little else to latch on". Jaeden Pinder of Paste felt the album lacks "depth and risk", describing it as a "series of vignettes" rather than a "fully fleshed-out record". Some critics have reviewed the album as inferior to Future Nostalgia and said it failed to match the high expectations set by Lipa. Common complaints found the album's production to be underwhelming and underdeveloped. For The Sunday Times, Dan Cairns writes of the album that it "excels..in its sonic detailing," citing 6 tracks as "genuinely fantastic songs, befitting of a star" whilst summarising the album as "Radical? Nope. Great (in parts). Absolutely".

== Commercial performance ==
Radical Optimism debuted at number one on the UK Albums Chart with 46,300 album-equivalent units, dethroning Taylor Swift and her album, The Tortured Poets Department, from the top spot and marking the best opening week for a British female artist since Adele's 30 in November 2021. It marked her first number one debut and her second number one album overall. Following Lipa's performance at the 2024 Glastonbury Festival, Radical Optimism returned to the top 10 of the UK Albums Chart at number three, selling an additional 9,300 copies that week, while her other two studio albums Future Nostalgia (2020) and Dua Lipa (2017) placed at numbers eight and 10, respectively. On 19 July 2024, the album was certified Gold by the BPI for selling 100,000 units in the country.

In the United States, Radical Optimism debuted at number two on the Billboard 200 (hindered by Taylor Swift's The Tortured Poets Department), with 83,000 equivalent units sold on its opening week, consisting of 51,500 pure album sales. With this feat, it became Lipa's highest-charting album in the country, surpassing the number three peak of her previous LP Future Nostalgia. It was also the top-selling album in pure sales that week and marked Lipa's highest first week overall units. In its second week on the chart, Radical Optimism fell nineteen places to number 21, selling an additional 23,000 copies, a 70% decline from its first week sales performance. In total, the album spent fifteen weeks on the Billboard 200, Lipa's shortest stay for any of her albums.

In France, the album debuted at number one on the SNEP Albums Chart, recording 19,501 units sold in its first week of release. Radical Optimism became Lipa's first French number one album and has since been certified Platinum in the country. Likewise, Radical Optimism debuted atop the Austrian Albums Chart and marked Lipa's first album to reach the summit in the country. In the Netherlands, the album debuted atop the Dutch Album Top 100, becoming Lipa's second Dutch number one album after Future Nostalgia topped the chart in 2021. In Spain, the album debuted at number one on the Spanish Albums Chart, becoming the singer's second album to reach the summit in the country, and was later awarded a Gold certification by PROMUSICAE. Across Europe, the album also peaked at number one in Croatia, Hungary, Poland, Portugal, and Wallonia. On 16 June 2024, Radical Optimism surpassed one billion streams on Spotify, becoming her third album to do so.

== Track listing ==
Standard edition
No.	Title	Writer(s)	Producer(s)	Length
1.	"End of an Era"	Dua Lipa; Kevin Parker; Danny L Harle; Caroline Ailin; Tobias Jesso Jr.	Parker; Harle; Cameron Gower Poole^{[v]}; Ailin^{[v]}	3:16
2.	"Houdini"	Lipa; Parker; Harle; Ailin; Jesso	Parker; Harle; Poole^{[v]}; Ailin^{[v]}	3:06
3.	"Training Season"	Lipa; Parker; Harle; Ailin; Jesso; Nick Gale^{[s]}; Martina Sorbara^{[s]}; Shaun Frank^{[s]}; Yaakov Gruzman^{[s]}; Steve Francis Richard Mastroianni^{[s]}	Parker; Harle^{[a]}; Poole^{[v]}; Ailin^{[v]}	3:29
4.	"These Walls"	Lipa; Andrew Wyatt; Harle; Billy Walsh; Ailin	Wyatt; Harle; Poole^{[v]}	3:38
5.	"Whatcha Doing"	Lipa; Parker; Harle; Ailin; Ali Tamposi	Parker; Harle^{[a]}; Poole^{[v]}	3:18
6.	"French Exit"	Lipa; Parker; Harle; Ailin; Jesso	Parker; Harle; Poole^{[v]}	3:21
7.	"Illusion"	Lipa; Parker; Harle; Ailin; Jesso	Parker; Harle; Poole^{[v]}; Ailin^{[v]}	3:08
8.	"Falling Forever"	Lipa; Ian Kirkpatrick; Harle; Emily Warren; Tamposi; Ailin	Kirkpatrick; Harle^{[a]}; Poole^{[v]}	3:43
9.	"Anything for Love"	Lipa; Kirkpatrick; Harle; Jesso; Julia Michaels; Ailin	Kirkpatrick; Harle^{[a]}; Poole^{[v]}	2:22
10.	"Maria"	Lipa; Wyatt; Harle; Michaels; Ailin	Wyatt; Harle; Poole^{[v]}	3:08
11.	"Happy for You"	Lipa; Parker; Harle; Ailin; Jesso	Parker; Harle; Poole^{[v]}	4:06
Total length:				36:35

=== Notes ===
- ^{^[a]} signifies an additional producer
- ^{^[v]} signifies a vocal producer
- ^{^[s]} signifies writers added due to a sample of "Tokyo Nights" by Digital Farm Animals, Shaun Frank, and Dragonette
- The special D2C edition includes "London sessions" versions of "Houdini" and "Training Season".
- The HMV exclusive limited deluxe edition includes "Houdini" (Adam Port mix), "Houdini" (Danny L Harle 'slowride' mix), and "Training Season" (Chloé Caillet mix).
- The extended edition includes extended versions of all 11 tracks.
- The Japanese edition includes "London sessions" versions of "Houdini", "Training Season", and "Illusion".
- The Japanese tour edition also includes "Illusion" (Creepy Nuts remix).

== Personnel ==
Credits adapted from the liner notes of Radical Optimism.

=== Musicians ===
- Dua Lipa – vocals (all tracks), backing vocals (tracks 5, 7, 11)
- Caroline Ailin – backing vocals (tracks 1–4, 6, 8–10)
- Kevin Parker – bass (tracks 1–3, 5–8, 11); guitar, keyboards, percussion, sound effects (1–3, 5–7, 11); drums (2–8, 11), programming (2, 3), backing vocals (3)
- Danny L Harle – synthesiser (tracks 1, 2, 4–11), drum programming (1, 2, 4, 6–11), backing vocals (1, 2, 10), bass (1, 4, 6, 8, 10); keyboards, percussion (1, 4, 7); programming (3, 9); drums, guitar (4); claps (5, 6, 10), whistle (7), piano (9)
- Tobias Jesso Jr. – backing vocals (track 3)
- Andrew Wyatt – guitar, synthesiser (tracks 4, 10); piano (4), backing vocals (10)
- Cameron Gower Poole – drum programming, thumb piano (track 4); tambourine (5)
- Jan Brzezinski – additional piano (track 4), piano (9)
- Ali Tamposi – adaptation (track 5), backing vocals (8)
- Ian Kirkpatrick – programming (tracks 8, 9), drums (8), guitar (9)
- Adam James – acoustic guitar (track 10)

=== Technical ===
- Chris Gehringer – mastering
- Josh Gudwin – mixing
- Cameron Gower Poole – engineering
- Kevin Parker – engineering (tracks 2, 3)
- Patrick Kehrier – engineering (track 8)
- Danny L Harle – arrangement (track 2)
- Will Quinnell – mastering assistance
- Daniela Sicilia – engineering assistance
- Josh Kay – engineering assistance
- Jan Brzezinski – engineering assistance (tracks 2–11)
- Patrick Gardner – engineering assistance (track 2)

=== Design ===
- Elena Totaj – branding, packaging design
- Eni Pirana – branding, packaging design
- Tyrone Lebon – photography
- BoDeBo Represents – photography production

== Charts ==
=== Weekly charts ===
Weekly chart performance for Radical Optimism
Chart (2024–2025)	Peak position
Argentine Albums (CAPIF)	2
Australian Albums (ARIA)	2
Austrian Albums (Ö3 Austria)	1
Belgian Albums (Ultratop Flanders)	2
Belgian Albums (Ultratop Wallonia)	1
Canadian Albums (Billboard)	3
Croatian International Albums (HDU)	1
Czech Albums (ČNS IFPI)	5
Danish Albums (Hitlisten)	6
Dutch Albums (Album Top 100)	1
Finnish Albums (Suomen virallinen lista)	3
French Albums (SNEP)	1
German Albums (Offizielle Top 100)	3
Greek Albums (IFPI)	88
Hungarian Albums (MAHASZ)	1
Icelandic Albums (Tónlistinn)	13
Irish Albums (Official Charts)	2
Italian Albums (FIMI)	2
Japanese Albums (Oricon)	17
Japanese Combined Albums (Oricon)	21
Japanese Hot Albums (Billboard Japan)	14
Lithuanian Albums (AGATA)	3
New Zealand Albums (RMNZ)	2
Norwegian Albums (VG-lista)	3
Polish Albums (ZPAV)	1
Portuguese Albums (AFP)	1
Scottish Albums (Official Charts)	1
Slovak Albums (ČNS IFPI)	4
Spanish Albums (Promusicae)	1
Swedish Albums (Sverigetopplistan)	4
Swiss Albums (Schweizer Hitparade)	2
UK Albums (Official Charts)	1
US Billboard 200	2

=== Monthly charts ===
Monthly chart performance for Radical Optimism
Chart (2024)	Position
Japanese Albums (Oricon)	47

=== Year-end charts ===
Year-end chart performance of Radical Optimism
Chart (2024)	Position
Australian Albums (ARIA)	93
Austrian Albums (Ö3 Austria)	50
Belgian Albums (Ultratop Flanders)	27
Belgian Albums (Ultratop Wallonia)	31
Croatian International Albums (HDU)	1
Dutch Albums (Album Top 100)	18
French Albums (SNEP)	25
German Albums (Offizielle Top 100)	74
Hungarian Albums (MAHASZ)	41
Italian Albums (FIMI)	85
Polish Albums (ZPAV)	72
Portuguese Albums (AFP)	36
Spanish Albums (PROMUSICAE)	29
Swiss Albums (Schweizer Hitparade)	72
UK Albums (OCC)	40
US Billboard 200	194

Year-end chart performance of Radical Optimism
Chart (2025)	Position
Australian Albums (ARIA)	100
Belgian Albums (Ultratop Flanders)	60
Belgian Albums (Ultratop Wallonia)	114
Dutch Albums (Album Top 100)	93
French Albums (SNEP)	56
Hungarian Albums (MAHASZ)	93

== Certifications ==
Certifications for Radical Optimism
Region	Certification	Certified units/sales
Belgium (BRMA)	Gold	10,000^{‡}
Brazil (Pro-Música Brasil)	2× Platinum	80,000^{‡}
Canada (Music Canada)	Platinum	80,000^{‡}
Denmark (IFPI Danmark)	Gold	10,000^{‡}
France (SNEP)	Platinum	100,000^{‡}
Italy (FIMI)	Platinum	50,000^{‡}
Mexico (AMPROFON)	Gold	70,000^{‡}
Netherlands (NVPI)	Platinum	37,200^{‡}
New Zealand (RMNZ)	Platinum	15,000^{‡}
Spain (Promusicae)	Gold	20,000^{‡}
United Kingdom (BPI)	Gold	175,397
^{‡} Sales+streaming figures based on certification alone.

== Release history ==
Release dates and formats for Radical Optimism
Region	Date	Format(s)	Edition(s)	Label	Ref.
Various	3 May 2024	Cassette; CD; digital download; streaming; vinyl LP	Standard	Warner	
United Kingdom	3 May 2024	CD	HMV exclusive limited deluxe	Warner	
Various	5 May 2024	Digital download	Special D2C	Warner	
Japan	8 May 2024	CD	Japanese bonus tracks	Warner	
Various	28 June 2024	Digital download; streaming	Extended version	Warner	
United Kingdom	28 June 2024	CD	HMV exclusive extended version	Warner	
Japan	13 November 2024	CD	Japan Tour	Warner	

== See also ==
- List of 2024 albums
- List of number-one albums of 2024 (Croatia)
- List of number-one albums of 2024 (Portugal)
- List of number-one albums of 2024 (Spain)
- List of UK Albums Chart number ones of the 2020s
