= Caroline Ailin =

Norwegian singer and songwriter (born 1989)

- Born: Caroline Ailin Buvik Furøyen; Bodø, Norway
- Genres: Pop; R&B
- Occupations: Songwriter; singer
- Years active: 2011–present

Caroline Furøyen (born 1989), also known by her stage name Caroline Ailin, is a Norwegian singer and songwriter based in London. She co-wrote "New Rules", a single by Dua Lipa which reached number 1 on the UK Singles Chart and US pop radio in 2017. In 2019 Ailin, along with her collaborators Ian Kirkpatrick and Emily Warren, wrote the hit Dua Lipa song "Don't Start Now", for which they received nominations for both Record of the Year and Song of the Year at the 63rd Annual Grammy Awards. She has also worked with a variety of other acts including, Zedd, Katy Perry, Clean Bandit, Ellie Goulding, Ella Mai, Louis the Child, MØ, and numerous others.

== Early life and education ==
Ailin was born and grew up in Bodø Municipality, Norway. She began making music at age 12 after listening to Alicia Keys' Songs in A Minor. At age 19, she moved to England to attend the Liverpool Institute for Performing Arts (LIPA). While still attending the school in 2011, Ailin performed at Parkenfestivalen, a music festival in her hometown, Bodø. She graduated from LIPA in 2012 with a BA in music. In May 2012, she was among five students to be given studio time with the school's founder, Paul McCartney.

== Career ==
Ailin signed a publishing contract with Oslo-based Waterfall Music in May 2012. She also signed a deal with Sony/ATV Music Publishing. In 2014, she wrote "Crocodile Tears" for the producer, Grades. For her songwriting work in 2015, the Norwegian Music Publisher Association awarded Ailin with the 2016 "Breakthrough of the Year" award. That year, she co-wrote a variety of songs, including Rachel Platten's "Hey Hey Hallelujah" and Olivia Holt's "History", the last of which charted in Belgium, the Netherlands, and other locales.

In 2017, Ailin co-wrote Dua Lipa's single, "New Rules". The song was released in July 2017 and made it to the top of the UK Singles Chart by the following month. It also peaked at number 6 on the Billboard Hot 100 and number 1 on the Mainstream Top 40 charts in the United States in 2018. Ailin later co-wrote and was a featured performer on the Louis the Child song "Last to Leave" released in December 2017. In 2018, the Norwegian Music Publisher Association honored Ailin with the Pop Song of the Year award for her work on "New Rules".

Later in 2018, Ailin co-wrote Clean Bandit's "Mama" featuring Ellie Goulding, which reached number 28 on the Billboard Dance chart. In February 2019, the Katy Perry and Zedd song, "365" (which Ailin co-wrote), was released. Over the course of her career, Ailin has worked with a number of other artists including Zara Larsson, Hailee Steinfeld, Alex Adair, Ella Mai, Snakehips, Aanysa, Four of Diamonds, and numerous others. In 2019 Ailin, along with her collaborators Ian Kirkpatrick (record producer) and Emily Warren wrote the hit Dua Lipa song Don't Start Now. Ailin has also written for K-Pop artists including Tiffany Young (of Girls' Generation), Taeyeon (of Girls' Generation), BoA, EXO-CBX. She has written and performed background vocals for single "Click" by Jisoo (of Blackpink), released on September 4, 2026.

== Discography ==
=== Extended plays ===
Title	Details
At My Worst	Released: 2010; Label: Girl & Hysteria; Format: Digital download, streaming

=== Singles ===
==== as featured artist ====
Year	Title	Album
2014	"Begging for Amnesia" (We Are Legends featuring Caroline Ailin)	Non-album single
2017	"Last to Leave" (Louis the Child (DJs) featuring Caroline Ailin)	Non-album single

=== Guest appearances ===
List of guest backing appearances for other performing artists, showing year released and album name
Year	Title	Other artist(s)	Album
2016	"Rockabye"	Clean Bandit, Anne-Marie, Sean Paul	What Is Love?

=== Songwriting credits ===
List of songwriting, production, and vocal credits on selected songs
Song	Year	Artist	Album	Role	Notes
"Begging for Amnesia"	2014	We Are Legends	Non-album single	Co-writer	
"Crocodile Tears"	2014	Grades	Non-album single	Co-writer	
"London Road"	2015	Lucy Spraggan	We Are	Co-writer	
"Talk"	2016	Tiffany Young	I Just Wanna Dance EP	Co-writer	
"History"	2016	Olivia Holt	Olivia	Co-writer	BEL No. 21
"What You Love"	2016	Olivia Holt	Olivia	Co-writer	
"Hey Hey Hallelujah"	2016	Rachel Platten (feat. Andy Grammer)	Wildfire	Co-writer	
"Burn Break Crash"	2016	Aanysa (feat. Snakehips)	Non-album single	Co-writer	US Dance No. 35
"Danger"	2016	JKAY	Non-album single	Co-writer	
"Cover Up"	2017	Taeyeon	My Voice	Co-writer	
"Casual"	2017	Alex Adair	Non-album single	Co-writer	SCO No. 87
"New Rules"	2017	Dua Lipa	Dua Lipa	Co-writer	UK No. 1
"Last to Leave"	2017	Louis the Child	Non-album single	Co-writer, vocals	
"Guilt Trip"	2018	Julie Bergan	Turn on the Lights	Co-writer	NOR No. 18
"One Shot, Two Shot"	2018	BoA	One Shot, Two Shot EP	Co-writer	
"It's You"	2018	Askling (feat. Gavin Mistry)	Non-album single	Co-writer	
"Blooming Days"	2018	EXO-CBX	Blooming Days	Co-writer	
"I Lied"	2018	Tove Styrke	Sway	Co-writer	
"Mama"	2018	Clean Bandit (feat. Ellie Goulding)	What Is Love?	Co-writer	US Dance No. 28
"Gut Feeling"	2018	Ella Mai (feat. H.E.R.)	Ella Mai	Co-writer	US R&B No. 11
"Talking to Yourself"	2018	Olly Murs	You Know I Know	Co-writer, vocals	
"Revival"	2018	Sigala (feat. Cheat Codes and MAX)	Brighter Days	Co-writer	
"Don't Wreck My Holiday"	2018	Black Saint (feat. Kelli-Leigh)	Non-album single	Co-writer	
"Stupid Things"	2018	Four of Diamonds (feat. Saweetie)	Non-album single	Co-writer	
"Starting Over"	2018	Niykee Heaton	Starting Over EP	Co-writer	
"365"	2019	Katy Perry and Zedd	Non-album single	Co-writer	US No. 86
"Speaker"	2019	Banx & Ranx (feat. ZieZie and Olivia Holt)	Non-album single	Co-writer	
"Hurt Again"	2019	Julia Michaels	Inner Monologue Part 2	Co-writer	
"Really Don't Like U"	2019	Tove Lo (feat. Kylie Minogue)	Sunshine Kitty	Co-writer	
"Bad Girlfriend"	2019	Olivia Holt	Non-album single	Co-writer	
"Don't Start Now"	2019	Dua Lipa	Future Nostalgia	Co-writer	UK No. 2
"Kissing Other People"	2019	Lennon Stella	Three. Two. One.	Co-writer	CAN No. 60
"Grey Area"	2019	Grey (feat. Sofia Carson)	Non-album single	Co-writer	
"Dance Again"	2020	Selena Gomez	Rare	Co-writer	CAN No. 96
"Let Me Get Me"	2020	Selena Gomez	Rare	Co-writer	POR No. 178
"Therapist"	2020	Mae Muller	Non-album single	Co-writer	
"Tell My Mama"	2020	Lauv	How I'm Feeling	Co-writer	
"Pretty Please"	2020	Dua Lipa	Future Nostalgia	Co-writer	POR No. 101
"Games"	2020	Lennon Stella	Three. Two. One.	Co-writer	
"Fear of Being Alone"	2020	Lennon Stella	Three. Two. One.	Co-writer	
"Since I Was a Kid"	2020	Lennon Stella	Three. Two. One.	Co-writer	
"Small Things"	2020	JoJo	Good to Know	Co-writer	
"Pick Me"	2020	Wafia	Good Things EP	Co-writer	
"Silence"	2020	Fletcher	The S(ex) Tapes	Co-writer	
"Good Choices"	2020	Astrid S	Leave It Beautiful	Co-writer	
"Guess I'm a Liar"	2020	Sofia Carson	Non-album single	Co-writer	
"Fever"	2020	Dua Lipa and Angèle	Future Nostalgia (French edition)	Co-writer	
"Never Learn My Lesson"	2020	Four of Diamonds	Non-album single	Co-writer	
"The One"	2021	Rita Ora and Imanbek	Bang EP	Co-writer	
"Gray"	2021	Demi Lovato	Dancing with the Devil... the Art of Starting Over	Co-writer	
"Morning"	2021	Zara Larsson	Poster Girl	Co-writer	
"Live to Survive"	2021	MØ	Motordrome	Co-writer	
"Mirror"	2021	Sigrid	How to Let Go	Co-writer	
"Burning Bridges"	2021	Sigrid	How to Let Go	Co-writer	
"Nice"	2021	Elohim	Journey to the Center of Myself, Vol. I	Co-writer	
"Sweet Dream"	2021	Alessia Cara	In the Meantime	Co-writer	
"Good Ones"	2021	Charli XCX	Crash	Co-writer	
"Start Walking"	2021	Tove Styrke	TBA	Co-writer	
"Telepath"	2021	Conan Gray	Non-album single	Co-writer	
"Strange and Unusual"	2022	Years & Years	Night Call	Co-writer	
"Cool to Cry"	2022	MØ	Motordrome	Co-writer	
"New Moon"	2022	MØ	Motordrome	Co-writer	
"Follow"	2022	Martin Garrix and Zedd	Non-album single	Co-writer	
"Sunset"	2023	Caroline Polachek	Desire, I Want to Turn Into You	Co-writer	
"One Of Us"	2023	Ava Max	Diamonds & Dancefloors	Co-writer	
"Dance the Night"	2023	Dua Lipa	Barbie the Album	Co-writer	UK No. 1
"Houdini"	2023	Dua Lipa	Radical Optimism	Co-writer	
"End of an Era"	2024	Dua Lipa	Radical Optimism	Co-writer	
"These Walls"	2024	Dua Lipa	Radical Optimism	Co-writer	
"Training Season"	2024	Dua Lipa	Radical Optimism	Co-writer	
"Watcha Doing"	2024	Dua Lipa	Radical Optimism	Co-writer	
"French Exit"	2024	Dua Lipa	Radical Optimism	Co-writer	
"Illusion"	2024	Dua Lipa	Radical Optimism	Co-writer	
"Falling Forever"	2024	Dua Lipa	Radical Optimism	Co-writer	
"Anything for Love"	2024	Dua Lipa	Radical Optimism	Co-writer	
"Maria"	2024	Dua Lipa	Radical Optimism	Co-writer	
"Happy For You"	2024	Dua Lipa	Radical Optimism	Co-writer	
"Touch"	2024	Katseye	SIS (Soft Is Strong)	Co-writer	
"Good as Gone"	2024	Kylie Minogue	Tension II	Co-writer	
"Adored"	2024	Paris Hilton	Infinite Icon	Co-writer	
"Little Monster"	2025	Illit	Bomb	Co-writer	
"Never Been Yours"	2025	Benny Benassi and Oaks			
"F.O.O.L"	2025	Julia Michaels	Second Self (EP)		
"Stateside"	2025	PinkPantheress	Fancy That		
"I Cant Have You Around Me Anymore"	2025	Reneé Rapp	Bite Me		
"Club Song"	2026	The Pussycat Dolls	Non-album single		
"Still Don't Care"	2026	Meghan Trainor	Toy with Me		
"Hush"	2026	Meghan Trainor	Toy with Me		
"Chef's Kiss"	2026	Meghan Trainor	Toy with Me		
"Just Wanna Cry"	2026	Meghan Trainor	Toy with Me		
"Surprise Surprise"	2026	Chloe Qisha	Fantasize		
"Baby Girl"	2026	Chloe Qisha	Fantasize		
"Mhm"	2026	Santos Bravos	Dual		
"I'm the Man"	2026	Adéla	Prima		
"Click"	2026	Jisoo	TBA		
