= Training Season =

Single by Dua Lipa

from the album Radical Optimism
- Written: November 2022
- Released: 15 February 2024
- Studio: 5DB (London); Woodshed (Malibu, California); Kevin Parker's home studio (Los Angeles)
- Genre: Disco-pop
- Length: 3:29
- Label: Warner
- Composers: Kevin Parker; Danny L Harle; Nicholas Gale; Martina Sorbara; Shaun Frank; Yaakov Gruzman; Steve Francis Richard Mastroianni
- Lyricists: Dua Lipa; Caroline Ailin; Tobias Jesso Jr.
- Producer: Kevin Parker

Dua Lipa singles chronology
| "Houdini" (2023) | "Training Season" (2024) | "Illusion" (2024) |

Music video
- "Training Season" on YouTube

"Training Season" is a song by English singer Dua Lipa from her third studio album, Radical Optimism (2024). Lipa wrote it with Caroline Ailin, Danny L Harle, Tobias Jesso Jr., and its producer, Kevin Parker. Warner Records released it as the album's second single on 15 February 2024. A disco-pop song with influences of Eurodisco, "Training Season" details the demands Lipa makes of her romantic partners as she chides bad dates and underscores her self-worth.

Music critics believed "Training Season" had commercial potential and a catchy production, grouping it in the album's memorable and uptempo segment along with the other singles. The song debuted at number four on the UK Singles Chart and number twenty-seven on the US Billboard Hot 100. It reached number one on airplay charts in the Commonwealth of Independent States, Latvia, Lithuania, and Turkey and the top ten in several other countries, receiving diamond certifications in Brazil and France and multi-platinum in Australia and Canada.

Vincent Haycock directed the music video, which depicts Lipa in a cafe listening to voicemails from former partners while surrounding men try to capture her attention. Lipa premiered the song at the 66th Annual Grammy Awards before its release and later performed it at the Brit Awards 2024 and the Time 100 Gala. She included it on the set list of her 2024–2025 concert tour, the Radical Optimism Tour, and sang it at festivals, including the Glastonbury Festival 2024.

== Background and release ==
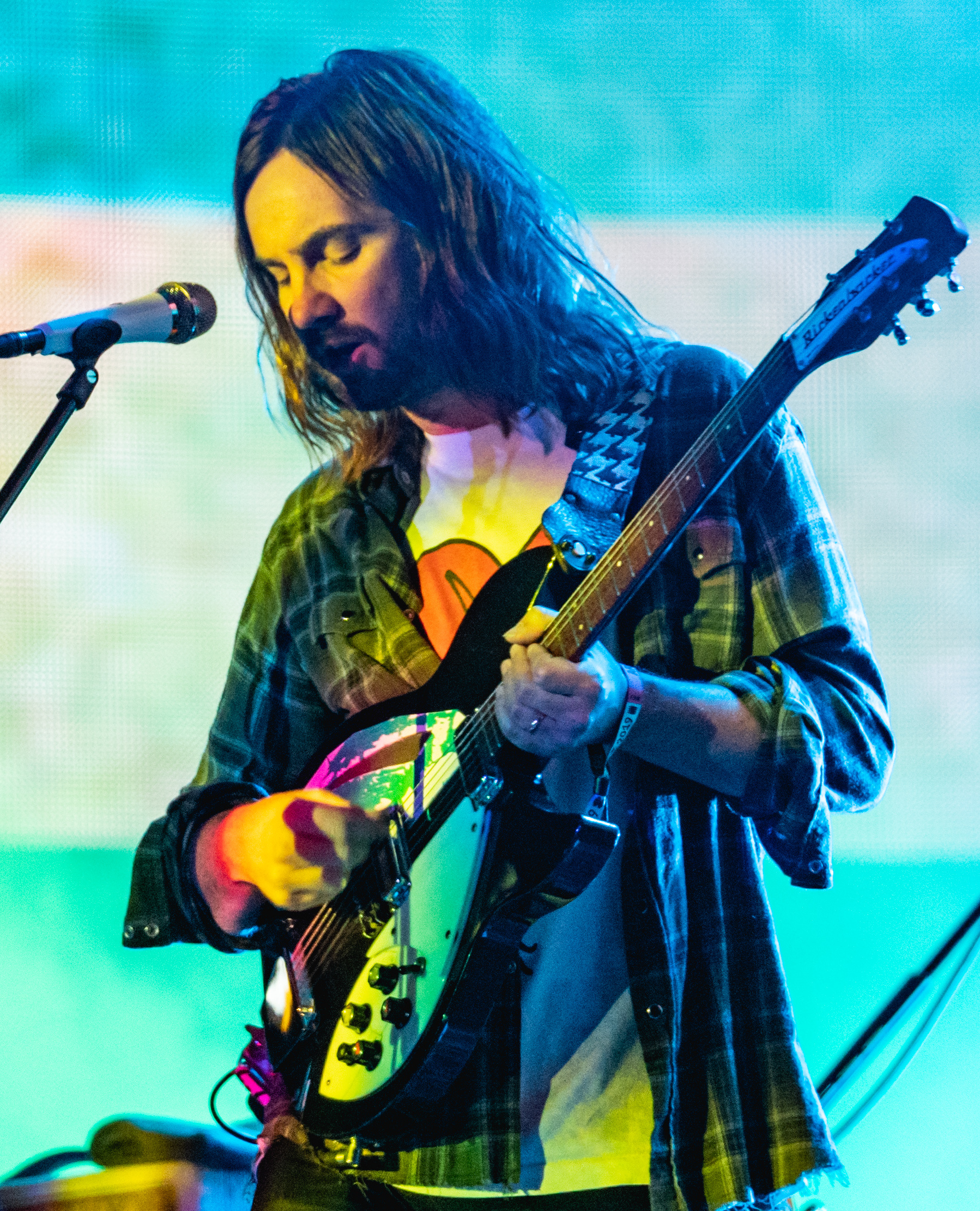
Kevin Parker (pictured in 2019) produced and co-wrote "Training Season".

Dua Lipa began writing songs intended for her third studio album in 2021. A large part of the songwriting had been completed by January 2022, and half of the album was finished by March. Lipa decided to move away from the disco sound of her second studio album, Future Nostalgia (2020), and write material evocative of 1970s-era psychedelia. The follow-up album began to take shape in July 2022, when Lipa met Kevin Parker, a psychedelic songwriter and leader of the psych-rock project Tame Impala. She invited him to a studio session with her longtime collaborator Caroline Ailin, electronica producer Danny L Harle, and folk-pop musician Tobias Jesso Jr. at 5DB in London. After becoming comfortable with each other, they completed a song the same day and three by the weekend.

Lipa had been taken out on a series of unimpressive dates and considered one of them "the final straw". The following morning, in November 2022, she joined Ailin and Jesso Jr. in a studio and declared that "training season is over". They wrote the song "Training Season", which was composed by Harle and Parker; Martina Sorbara, Nicholas Gale, Shaun Frank, Steve Francis Richard Mastroianni, and Yaakov Gruzman also received credits due to an interpolation of the composition "Tokyo Nights". Lipa expanded on the dual meaning of the title of "Training Season", stating that it is about both informing men that she will no longer be training them how to treat her as well as the completion of her own personal growth.

Lipa ended up writing 97 songs for the album; 8 of the 11 tracks finally included were written with Ailin, Harle, Jesso Jr., and Parker. Lipa released the song "Houdini" as the lead single in November 2023. She wore a sweater with the caption "Training Season" in an Instagram photo and posted a TikTok video of her singing the chorus in a car in January 2024. She premiered the song at the Grammy Awards on 4 February. Warner Records released it as the second single from the album 11 days later, accompanied by extended, instrumental, and a cappella versions. The following day, Warner Music Group sent "Training Season" for radio airplay in Italy and made it available on physical formats like 7-inch, cassette, and CD in various countries. Warner Records promoted the song to contemporary hit radio stations in the United States. In March, several other versions were released. (Note: These included Live at the Brit Awards 2024, extended instrumental, London sessions, acoustic, and Chloé Caillet mix.) The album title was revealed to be Radical Optimism (2024) that month, and "Illusion" (2024) was released as the follow-up single. In November 2025, "Training Season" was used in an NBC Sports advertisement starring Lipa that promoted the 2026 Winter Olympics.

== Composition ==
"Training Season"
"Training Season" is a disco-pop song with influences of Eurodisco. Aspects of it, including the Middle Eastern-influenced melody, received comparisons to the work of ABBA.

"Training Season" is 3 minutes and 29 seconds long. Parker produced, programmed, and engineered the song, with engineering assistance from Cameron Gower Poole. In addition to playing bass guitar, drums, guitar, keyboards, and percussion, Parker also provided sound effects. Harle handled drum programming, and Ailin and Poole provided vocal production. Recording took place at 5DB Studios in London, Woodshed Recording in Malibu, and Parker's home studio in Los Angeles. Parker, Ailin, and Jesso Jr. contributed background vocals. Josh Gudwin mixed the song, and Chris Gehringer handled mastering at Sterling Sound in New York City.

"Training Season" is a disco-pop song with influences of Eurodisco. It has also been characterised separately as a disco and pop song. The track employs a hook, disco beat, guitar syncopations, synthesizers, and live drums. "Training Season" includes girl group harmonies and a dancefloor pulse. Critics compared the song's disco-pop sound to "Houdini" and Future Nostalgia. They believed it represented Radical Optimism's sonic palette of synths, organic basslines, and guitar flourishes better than "Houdini", while Robin Murray of Clash felt that it adds "some trippy, Tame Impala aspects to her glossy pop mixture". Features of "Training Season" received comparisons to the work of ABBA: its piano line to "Dancing Queen" (1976), the Middle Eastern-influenced melody to "Gimme! Gimme! Gimme! (A Man After Midnight)" (1979) and "Voulez-Vous" (1979), and its robustness to "Lay All Your Love on Me" (1981).

The lyrics of "Training Season" are about the demands Lipa makes of her romantic partners as she chides bad dates and underscores her self-worth, highlighting the importance she places on boundaries and standards in relationships. In the first verse, Lipa articulates her skepticism about a prospective partner and considers not proceeding with a relationship. She yearns for someone who can provide emotional support, take command when she feels vulnerable, and engage her in meaningful conversations. Lipa asks a person if he can meet these requirements before declaring that she no longer wants to have to guide people how to love her correctly: "Training season's over". In the second verse, she takes a vexed tone and recalls how she undeservedly tried to be positive about her previous partners, hoping that a better suitor "hits me like an arrow". Lipa questions the prospective partner about his commitment in the bridge, whether he would take initiative himself or someone would have to prompt him to act. Consequence's Mary Siroky believed its theme of self-confidence resembled Lipa's 2017 single "New Rules".

== Critical reception ==
Upon release, music critics opined that "Training Season" had commercial potential. Billboard's Jason Lipshutz included the song in the magazine's Friday Music Guide, which predicts music that will gain popularity in playlists, and Pitchfork put it in their Selects playlist. Others considered it a potential summer anthem for women and well-suited for a stadium audience. Steffanee Wang of Nylon believed "Training Season" was one of Lipa's best singles in a while, and Angie Martoccio of Rolling Stone thought it was among her strongest vocal performances.

Reviewers believed "Training Season" was catchy, describing it as an "earworm" and both the hook and the beat as "infectious". It was grouped with the album's other singles by some critics, who believed they had a similar club-friendly and memorable production most suited for parties. Lisa Wright of DIY believed the singles constituted the more assertive and "after-hours" segment of Radical Optimism, which otherwise focused on turbulent romantic experiences, and Variety's Steven J. Horowitz thought they enhanced the feel-good quality of the album. The Arts Desk's Joe Muggs praised the songwriting on the singles and believed the sound was consistent with Lipa's other material. Lipshutz thought that "Training Season" showcased her most powerful musical instincts and that people who enjoyed her 2020 single "Physical" would become fans of it.

Others also commented on the production of "Training Season". Aimee Phillips of Clash thought the beats were deeper, more layered, and sensual than Radical Optimism's opening track "End of an Era", while the lyrics carried greater intent, reinforcing the bold and self-assured pop star persona that Lipa had presented. Rania Aniftos of Billboard ranked it seventh among the album's eleven songs, claiming "if the lyrics aren't motivating enough, the thumping bass should do the trick." Variety's Jem Aswad believed ABBA's influence was initially subdued but later realised by the piano flourishes, which formed "the best kind of tribute: nothing overt, but a sly, fun wink for fans who notice it". Some felt that "Training Season" had a cluttered production which could use more breathing room and that the extended version proved that eschewing "the immediacy" built into the song would improve it.

"Training Season" was included on critical lists of the best songs of 2024 at number 20 by DIY, number 31 by Slant Magazine, number 42 by NME, and number 79 by Rolling Stone. In June 2025, British Vogue's staff placed the track in a list of their favourite Lipa songs. It was nominated for the Brit Award for Song of the Year at the 2025 ceremony.

== Commercial performance ==
"Training Season" debuted at number four on the UK Singles Chart and became Lipa's 15th top ten single. The song received a platinum certification in the United Kingdom from the British Phonographic Industry. It entered the US Billboard Hot 100 at number 27 on the chart issued for 2 March 2024. "Training Season" debuted at number 11 on the Canadian Hot 100 issued for the same date and was certified quadruple platinum by Music Canada. In Australia, the song entered at number 12 and received a double platinum certification from the Australian Recording Industry Association. It debuted at number 10 in New Zealand and became Lipa's ninth top ten single. Recorded Music NZ certified the song platinum.

"Training Season" charted at number six on the Billboard Global 200. The song reached number one on airplay charts in the Commonwealth of Independent States, Latvia, Lithuania, and Turkey and the top ten in several countries in Asia and Europe. (Note: Positions included number two in Russia, number three in Bulgaria, Croatia, Nicaragua, and Slovakia, number four in Estonia, Hungary, Lebanon, Poland, and Romania, number six in Belarus and Kazakhstan, number seven in Serbia and South Africa, and number eight in Paraguay.) It also reached the top ten on national record charts at number four in Belgium, number six in Ireland, and number eight in the Netherlands. "Training Season" received diamond certifications in Brazil and France; double platinum in Greece and Portugal; platinum in Belgium, Italy, Poland, and Spain; and gold in Denmark, Germany, and Switzerland.

In 2026, "Training Season" saw a resurgence on the charts due to going viral on social media. The song re-entered the UK Singles Chart at number 53 on 28 August. That same day, an extended play titled Training Season's Over was released for digital download and streaming, which contains various live performances of it, including from Lipa's television special An Evening with Dua Lipa (2024) and her live album Dua Lipa - Live from Mexico (2026), as well as the original track. One week later, "Training Season" rose to number 18 in the United Kingdom. The song also re-entered the Irish Singles Chart at number 30, the Ö3 Austria Top 40 at number 23, and the Swiss Hitparade at number 41.

== Music video ==
Vincent Haycock directed the music video, which was released alongside the song. In the video, Lipa drinks coffee in a cafe while listening to several voicemails from former partners apologising and asking for a second chance. She realises that the men around her are all vying for her attention but remains unfazed. Lipa begins to think about what she is looking for in a suitor. She stays reserved as they begin to spin and the room descends into disorder. Upon its release, the video received over one million views within the first 12 hours of availability.

== Live performances ==
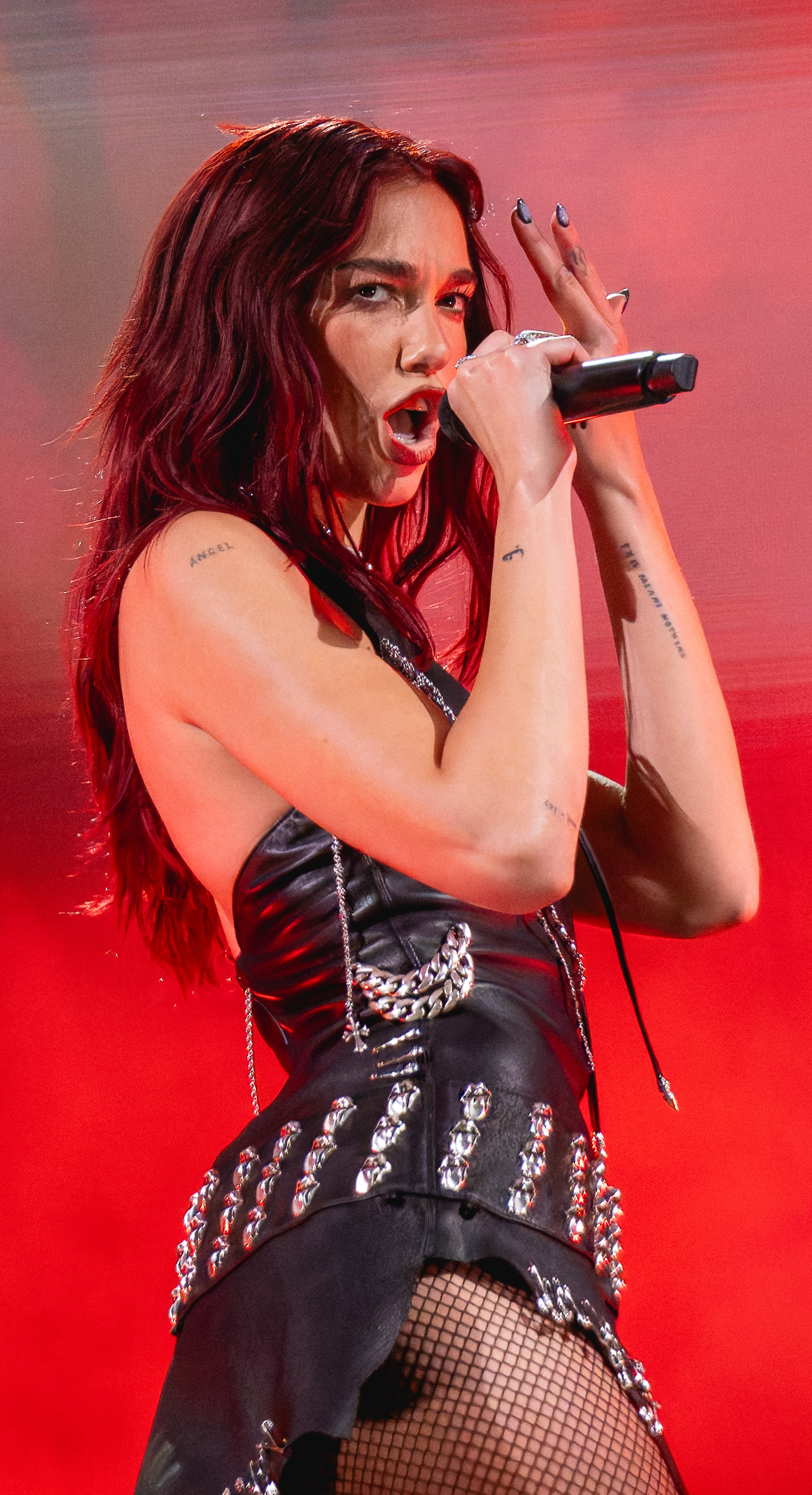
Lipa performing "Training Season" at the Glastonbury Festival 2024

Lipa opened the Grammy Awards with the first live performance of "Training Season" on 4 February 2024, as a mashup with "Houdini" and "Dance the Night" (2023), prior to its release. The set employed blue stage lights and a vertiginous backdrop of mirrors and pyrotechnics. Lipa wore a leather-and-mesh bodysuit with silver straps and knee-high platform boots. She performed "Training Season" as the first song, dancing on a giant silver jungle gym which was rotated by leather-clothed muscular male background dancers. One line from "Dance the Night" was included, before Lipa transitioned into "Houdini". The performance was well received by the audience and critics. Reviewers thought the performance was a strong opening to the show, praising its choreography and male dancers, with Alex Hopper of American Songwriter including it among Lipa's three best live moments. The Telegraph and Parade listed it among the night's highlights, while USA Today ranked it ninth among the ceremony's twelve performances.

On 2 March 2024, Lipa opened the Brit Awards 2024 by reprising "Training Season" in a black leather outfit with lace-up boots. Lipa began by singing alone, and background dancers descended from the top during the second verse and performed Cirque du Soleil-inspired acrobatic tricks in the air. After the song's bridge, two aerial dancers seized her arms and lifted her off the ground and she was suspended in the air. Critics believed the performance captivated the audience, and Uproxx's Flisadam Pointer thought that the aerial dance moves were impressive and that Lipa displayed stamina. Lipa recorded a live version of the track, which was titled "Training Season (London Sessions)". She sang the song at the Time 100 Gala in April and reprised it alongside a band at the Maida Vale Studios in London the following month.

On 28 June 2024, Lipa opened her Glastonbury Festival 2024 headlining set with "Training Season"; it began with stationary dancers, evoking a dystopian montage reminiscent of The Running Man (1987), before Lipa walked out to a clip of Peter Fonda from the 1966 film The Wild Angels. NME's Liberty Dunworth praised the atmosphere created only a few minutes into Lipa's set, and BBC News's Mark Savage believed the choreography was on the level of a proper award show performance. She performed it at other festivals like NOS Alive and Mad Cool in July as well as a Tiny Desk concert in October. Lipa included "Training Season" as the first song on the set list of her 2024–2025 concert tour, the Radical Optimism Tour. The song's first verse was performed in a slowed-down and sultry manner, which Consequence's Paolo Ragusa considered a weak opening and inconsistent with the oceanic visual aesthetic. Others were positive, and Billboard's Hollie Geraghty picked it as one of the nine best moments of Lipa's Wembley Stadium show while highlighting the use of pyrotechnics. She sang "Training Season" during a performance at the Royal Albert Hall on 17 October and the Radical Optimism Tour's Mexico shows, which were released as the live albums Dua Lipa Live from the Royal Albert Hall (2024) and Dua Lipa - Live from Mexico, respectively.

== Credits and personnel ==
Credits are adapted from the liner notes of Radical Optimism.

- Kevin Parker – background vocals, songwriter, producer, engineer, programming, bass guitar, drums, guitar, keyboards, percussion, sound effects
- Dua Lipa – vocals, songwriter
- Danny L Harle – songwriter, additional producer, drum programming
- Caroline Ailin – background vocals, songwriter, vocal producer
- Tobias Jesso Jr. – background vocals, songwriter
- Nicholas Gale – songwriter
- Martina Sorbara – songwriter
- Shaun Frank – songwriter
- Yaakov Gruzman – songwriter
- Steve Francis Richard Mastroianni – songwriter
- Cameron Gower Poole – vocal producer, engineer
- Chris Gehringer – mastering
- Josh Gudwin – mixing

== Charts ==
=== Weekly charts ===
2024–2025 weekly chart performance for "Training Season"
| Chart (2024–2025) | Peak position |
|---|---|
| Argentina Hot 100 (Billboard) | 52 |
| Australia (ARIA) | 12 |
| Austria (Ö3 Austria Top 40) | 23 |
| Belarus Airplay (TopHit) | 6 |
| Belgium (Ultratop 50 Flanders) | 7 |
| Belgium (Ultratop 50 Wallonia) | 4 |
| Brazil Hot 100 (Billboard) | 61 |
| Bulgaria Airplay (PROPHON) | 3 |
| Canada Hot 100 (Billboard) | 11 |
| Canada AC (Billboard) | 24 |
| Canada CHR/Top 40 (Billboard) | 21 |
| Canada Hot AC (Billboard) | 14 |
| Central America Anglo Airplay (Monitor Latino) | 3 |
| Chile Airplay (Monitor Latino) | 12 |
| Colombia Anglo Airplay (National-Report) | 1 |
| CIS Airplay (TopHit) | 1 |
| Costa Rica Anglo Airplay (Monitor Latino) | 3 |
| Croatia International Airplay (Top lista) | 3 |
| Czech Republic Airplay (ČNS IFPI) | 96 |
| Czech Republic Singles Digital (ČNS IFPI) | 29 |
| Denmark (Tracklisten) | 21 |
| El Salvador Airplay (Monitor Latino) | 19 |
| Estonia Airplay (TopHit) | 4 |
| Finland (Suomen virallinen lista) | 40 |
| France (SNEP) | 17 |
| France Airplay (SNEP) | 1 |
| Germany (GfK) | 25 |
| Germany Airplay (MusicTrace) | 5 |
| Global 200 (Billboard) | 6 |
| Greece International (IFPI) | 2 |
| Guatemala Anglo Airplay (Monitor Latino) | 3 |
| Hungary (Dance Top 40) | 17 |
| Hungary (Rádiós Top 40) | 4 |
| Hungary (Single Top 40) | 21 |
| Iceland (Tónlistinn) | 23 |
| Ireland (IRMA) | 6 |
| Italy (FIMI) | 51 |
| Italy Airplay (EarOne) | 5 |
| Japan Hot Overseas (Billboard Japan) | 4 |
| Kazakhstan Airplay (TopHit) | 6 |
| Latin America Anglo Airplay (Monitor Latino) | 1 |
| Latvia Airplay (LaIPA) | 1 |
| Lebanon (Lebanese Top 20) | 4 |
| Lithuania (AGATA) | 12 |
| Lithuania Airplay (TopHit) | 1 |
| Luxembourg (Billboard) | 10 |
| Mexico Anglo Airplay (Monitor Latino) | 2 |
| Middle East and North Africa (IFPI) | 11 |
| Moldova Airplay (TopHit) | 31 |
| Netherlands (Dutch Top 40) | 8 |
| Netherlands (Single Top 100) | 20 |
| New Zealand (Recorded Music NZ) | 10 |
| Nicaragua Anglo Airplay (Monitor Latino) | 3 |
| Nigeria (TurnTable Top 100) | 34 |
| Norway (VG-lista) | 14 |
| Norway Airplay (IFPI) | 31 |
| Panama International (PRODUCE) | 26 |
| Paraguay Airplay (Monitor Latino) | 8 |
| Peru Anglo Airplay (Monitor Latino) | 6 |
| Poland Airplay (OLiS) | 4 |
| Poland Streaming (OLiS) | 19 |
| Portugal (AFP) | 21 |
| Romania Airplay (Media Forest) | 4 |
| Romania TV Airplay (Media Forest) | 10 |
| Russia Airplay (TopHit) | 2 |
| Serbia Airplay (Radiomonitor) | 7 |
| Singapore (RIAS) | 20 |
| Slovakia Airplay (ČNS IFPI) | 3 |
| Slovakia Singles Digital (ČNS IFPI) | 12 |
| South Africa Airplay (TOSAC) | 7 |
| South Korea BGM (Circle) | 38 |
| South Korea Download (Circle) | 54 |
| Spain (Promusicae) | 32 |
| Sweden (Sverigetopplistan) | 15 |
| Switzerland (Schweizer Hitparade) | 15 |
| Switzerland Airplay (MusicTrace) | 1 |
| Turkey International Airplay (Radiomonitor Türkiye) | 1 |
| Ukraine Airplay (TopHit) | 40 |
| United Arab Emirates (IFPI) | 12 |
| UK Singles (Official Charts) | 4 |
| US Billboard Hot 100 | 27 |
| US Adult Pop Airplay (Billboard) | 17 |
| US Hot Dance/Electronic Songs (Billboard) | 2 |
| US Pop Airplay (Billboard) | 16 |
| Venezuela Airplay (Record Report) | 65 |

2026 weekly chart performance for "Training Season"
| Chart (2026) | Peak position |
|---|---|
| Argentina Hot 100 (Billboard) | 42 |
| Australia (Billboard) | 20 |
| Australia On Replay Singles (ARIA) | 11 |
| Austria (Ö3 Austria Top 40) | 6 |
| Brazil Hot 100 (Billboard) | 61 |
| Central America Anglo Airplay (Monitor Latino) | 12 |
| Chile Anglo Airplay (Monitor Latino) | 14 |
| Colombia Anglo Airplay (National-Report) | 7 |
| CIS Airplay (TopHit) | 69 |
| Costa Rica Anglo Airplay (Monitor Latino) | 12 |
| Czech Republic Singles Digital (ČNS IFPI) | 42 |
| Ecuador Anglo Airplay (Monitor Latino) | 10 |
| El Salvador Anglo Airplay (Monitor Latino) | 9 |
| Estonia Airplay (TopHit) | 126 |
| France (SNEP) | 81 |
| Germany (GfK) | 16 |
| Germany Airplay (MusicTrace) | 92 |
| Global 200 (Billboard) | 3 |
| Greece International (IFPI) | 7 |
| Greece International (IFPI) Live from the Royal Albert Hall | 89 |
| Guatemala Anglo Airplay (Monitor Latino) | 5 |
| Hong Kong (Billboard) | 13 |
| Indonesia (IFPI) | 17 |
| Ireland (IRMA) | 22 |
| Israel (Mako Hitlist) | 86 |
| Italy (FIMI) | 38 |
| Latin America Anglo Airplay (Monitor Latino) | 10 |
| Lithuania Airplay (TopHit) | 80 |
| Luxembourg (Billboard) | 10 |
| Malaysia (IFPI) | 2 |
| Malaysia International (RIM) | 1 |
| Mexico Anglo Airplay (Monitor Latino) | 12 |
| Middle East and North Africa (IFPI) | 15 |
| Netherlands (Single Top 100) | 45 |
| Norway (VG-lista) | 55 |
| Panama Streaming (PRODUCE) | 198 |
| Peru Anglo Airplay (Monitor Latino) | 11 |
| Philippines (IFPI) | 15 |
| Philippines Hot 100 (Billboard Philippines) | 13 |
| Poland Streaming (OLiS) | 95 |
| Portugal (AFP) | 20 |
| Romania (Billboard) | 23 |
| Russia Airplay (TopHit) | 69 |
| Singapore (RIAS) | 5 |
| Slovakia Airplay (ČNS IFPI) | 55 |
| Slovakia Singles Digital (ČNS IFPI) | 76 |
| Spain (Promusicae) | 48 |
| Spain Airplay (Promusicae) | 47 |
| Sweden (Sverigetopplistan) | 81 |
| Switzerland (Schweizer Hitparade) | 11 |
| Taiwan (Billboard) | 7 |
| Thailand (Billboard) | 25 |
| United Arab Emirates (IFPI) | 6 |
| UK Singles (Official Charts) | 5 |
| US Hot Dance/Pop Songs (Billboard) | 4 |
| Vietnam Hot 100 (Billboard) | 95 |

=== Monthly charts ===
2024 monthly chart performance for "Training Season"
| Chart (2024) | Peak position |
|---|---|
| Belarus Airplay (TopHit) | 9 |
| CIS Airplay (TopHit) | 1 |
| Czech Republic Singles Digitál (ČNS IFPI) | 58 |
| Estonia Airplay (TopHit) | 5 |
| Kazakhstan Airplay (TopHit) | 13 |
| Latvia Airplay (TopHit) | 4 |
| Lithuania Airplay (TopHit) | 5 |
| Moldova Airplay (TopHit) | 91 |
| Paraguay Airplay (SGP) | 72 |
| Romania Airplay (TopHit) | 22 |
| Russia Airplay (TopHit) | 3 |
| Slovakia Airplay (ČNS IFPI) | 7 |
| Slovakia Singles Digitál (ČNS IFPI) | 30 |
| Ukraine Airplay (TopHit) | 62 |

2026 monthly chart performance for "Training Season"
| Chart (2026) | Peak position |
|---|---|
| CIS Airplay (TopHit) | 78 |

=== Year-end charts ===
2024 year-end chart performance for "Training Season"
| Chart (2024) | Position |
|---|---|
| Belarus Airplay (TopHit) | 43 |
| Belgium (Ultratop 50 Flanders) | 23 |
| Belgium (Ultratop 50 Wallonia) | 18 |
| Canada (Canadian Hot 100) | 65 |
| CIS Airplay (TopHit) | 21 |
| Estonia Airplay (TopHit) | 18 |
| France (SNEP) | 40 |
| Global 200 (Billboard) | 113 |
| Hungary (Dance Top 40) | 45 |
| Hungary (Rádiós Top 40) | 14 |
| Iceland (Tónlistinn) | 60 |
| Kazakhstan Airplay (TopHit) | 88 |
| Lithuania Airplay (TopHit) | 12 |
| Netherlands (Dutch Top 40) | 22 |
| Netherlands (Single Top 100) | 59 |
| Poland (Polish Airplay Top 100) | 28 |
| Portugal (AFP) | 119 |
| Russia Airplay (TopHit) | 49 |
| UK Singles (OCC) | 55 |
| US Hot Dance/Electronic Songs (Billboard) | 7 |
| Venezuela Anglo Airplay (Record Report) | 5 |

2025 year-end chart performance for "Training Season"
| Chart (2025) | Position |
|---|---|
| Argentina Anglo Airplay (Monitor Latino) | 43 |
| Belgium (Ultratop 50 Flanders) | 137 |
| Canada AC (Billboard) | 87 |
| CIS Airplay (TopHit) | 153 |
| Hungary (Dance Top 40) | 53 |
| Hungary (Rádiós Top 40) | 12 |
| Lithuania Airplay (TopHit) | 49 |

== Certifications ==
Certifications for "Training Season"
| Region | Certification | Certified units/sales |
|---|---|---|
| Australia (ARIA) | 2× Platinum | 140,000^{‡} |
| Belgium (BRMA) | Platinum | 40,000^{‡} |
| Brazil (Pro-Música Brasil) | Diamond | 160,000^{‡} |
| Canada (Music Canada) | 4× Platinum | 320,000^{‡} |
| Denmark (IFPI Danmark) | Gold | 45,000^{‡} |
| France (SNEP) | Diamond | 333,333^{‡} |
| Germany (BVMI) | Gold | 300,000^{‡} |
| Italy (FIMI) | Platinum | 100,000^{‡} |
| New Zealand (RMNZ) | 2× Platinum | 60,000^{‡} |
| Poland (ZPAV) | Platinum | 50,000^{‡} |
| Portugal (AFP) | 2× Platinum | 50,000^{‡} |
| Spain (Promusicae) | Platinum | 60,000^{‡} |
| Switzerland (IFPI Switzerland) | Gold | 15,000^{‡} |
| United Kingdom (BPI) | Platinum | 1,008,526 |
Streaming
| Czech Republic (ČNS IFPI) | Platinum | 5,000,000^{†} |
| Greece (IFPI Greece) | 2× Platinum | 4,000,000^{†} |
| Slovakia (ČNS IFPI) | Platinum | 1,700,000^{†} |
^{‡} Sales+streaming figures based on certification alone.^{†} Streaming-only figures based on certification alone.

== Release history ==
Release dates and format(s) for "Training Season"
| Region | Date | Format(s) | Version | Label | Ref. |
|---|---|---|---|---|---|
| Various | 15 February 2024 | Digital download; streaming | Original; extended; instrumental; acapella | Warner | |
| Italy | 16 February 2024 | Radio airplay | Original | Warner | |
| Europe | 16 February 2024 | 7-inch single; CS; CD | Original; instrumental (Note: Of the physical editions, only the 7-inch single includes the instrumental version.) | Warner | |
| United Kingdom | 16 February 2024 | 7-inch single; CS; CD | Original; instrumental | Warner | |
| United States | 16 February 2024 | 7-inch single; CS; CD | Original; instrumental | Warner | |
| Australia | February 2024 | 7-inch single; CS; CD | Original; instrumental | Warner | |
| Various | 4 March 2024 | Digital download; streaming | Live at the Brit Awards 2024 | Warner | |
| Various | 4 March 2024 | Digital download; streaming | Extended instrumental | Warner | |
| United Kingdom | 4 March 2024 | CD and CS bundle | Original | Warner | |
| United States | 5 March 2024 | Contemporary hit radio | Original | Warner | |
| Various | 15 March 2024 | Digital download; streaming | London sessions | Warner | |
| Various | 22 March 2024 | Digital download; streaming | Acoustic version | Warner | |
| Various | 29 March 2024 | Digital download; streaming | Chloé Caillet mix | Warner | |
| Various | 4 April 2024 | Digital download; streaming | Chloé Caillet club mix | Warner | |
| Various | 28 August 2026 | Digital download; streaming | Live from the Royal Albert Hall; original; live from Mexico; BBC Radio 1 Live Lounge; London sessions | Warner | |
