= These Walls (Dua Lipa song) =

Promotional single by Dua Lipa featuring Pierre de Maere

from the album Radical Optimism
- Released: 8 November 2024
- Genre: Dance-pop; indie pop; soft rock
- Length: 3:38
- Label: Warner
- Songwriters: Dua Lipa; Andrew Wyatt; Danny L Harle; Billy Walsh; Caroline Ailin
- Producers: Andrew Wyatt; Danny L Harle

Lyric video
- "These Walls" on YouTube

"These Walls" is a song by English singer Dua Lipa from her third studio album, Radical Optimism (2024). It was written by Lipa, Andrew Wyatt, Danny L Harle, Billy Walsh and Caroline Ailin, and produced by Wyatt and Harle. "These Walls" received favourable reviews from music critics and reached top 40 in the United Kingdom and Norway. An alternative version of "These Walls" featuring Belgian singer Pierre de Maere was released as promotional single on 8 November 2024. It reached the top ten in both regions of Belgium (Flanders and Wallonia).

== Background ==
In an interview with Apple Music's Zane Lowe, Lipa said she wrote "These Walls" on 16 January 2023. She said she got the idea of the track from being able to feel the energy of two people who have been arguing when you walk into a room. "Rooms capture things and they hold on to things", she said. "I think this song is a really good example of addressing the inevitable, it's that conversation that no one really wants to have, but you have to do it". "These Walls" was released on 3 May 2024 by Warner Records, on Lipa's third studio album, Radical Optimism.

An alternative version featuring Belgian singer Pierre de Maere was released as a promotional single on 8 November 2024. This duet version includes additional lyrics in French (sung by de Maere, and, to a much lesser extent, by Lipa).

== Composition ==
Lipa wrote "These Walls" with Billy Walsh, Caroline Ailin, and its producers Andrew Wyatt and Danny L Harle. "These Walls" is a dance-pop, indie pop, and soft rock breakup song. It is the only track tacked with the "explicit" label on Radical Optimism. It opens with Lipa illustrating a couple that's gotten used to shutting each other out. "Maybe we should switch careers'/ Cause, baby, you know no one beats our poker faces/ And when the night ends up in tears/ Wake up and we blame it all on being wasted", she sings. But the chorus is where Lipa gets real, singing that "if these walls could talk" they'd say, "enough, give up, you're fucked". She continues, "It's not supposed to hurt this much/ Oh, if these walls could talk/ They'd tell us to break up".

== Critical reception ==
"These Walls" received positive reviews from music critics. Neil Z. Yeung of AllMusic called "These Walls" a "chilled-out, dance-pop bop that lightens the spirit". Writing for The Observer, Kitty Empire noted that "These Walls" is the "pithiest" of the non-single tracks on Radical Optimism. In Variety, Steven J. Horowitz wrote, "'These Walls' is the album's most arresting song, on which Lipa bemoans the growing distance from a lover with a knowing nod: 'They tell us go and face your fears / It's getting worse the longer that we stay together / We call it love but hate it here / Do we really mean it when we said forever?'". Sal Cinquemani of Slant Magazine called the track "the most serenely devastating break-up song in recent memory", due to its blend of tropical melodies with more lovelorn lyrics. According to Helen Brown of The Independent, the song is "so sweetly peppy that non-Anglophones are unlikely to realise is a breakup song".

== Commercial performance ==
Within its first week of availability, "These Walls" became the most commercially successful non-single song from Radical Optimism. It debuted at number 40 in the United Kingdom, becoming Lipa's 27th top 40 chart entry on the UK singles chart. It also debuted at numbers 39 in Norway, 44 in Ireland, 54 in Sweden and 65 in Canada. After the release of "These Walls" featuring Belgian singer Pierre de Maere, the song reached numbers eight in Wallonia and nine in Flanders.

== Charts ==
=== Weekly charts ===
2024–2025 weekly chart performance
Chart (2024–2025)	Peak position
Belgium (Ultratop 50 Flanders)	6
Belgium (Ultratop 50 Wallonia)	8
Bolivia Airplay (Monitor Latino)	6
Canada Hot 100 (Billboard)	65
Canada AC (Billboard)	18
Croatia International Airplay (Top lista) Pierre de Maere version	25
France (SNEP)	90
France (SNEP) Pierre de Maere version	60
Global 200 (Billboard)	68
Greece International (IFPI)	76
Ireland (IRMA)	44
Japan Hot Overseas (Billboard Japan)	11
Latvia Airplay (TopHit)	101
Lebanon English (Lebanese Top 20)	20
Lithuania (AGATA)	91
New Zealand Hot Singles (RMNZ)	7
New Zealand Hot Singles (RMNZ) Pierre de Maere version	36
Norway (VG-lista)	39
Portugal (AFP)	74
Romania Airplay (TopHit)	25
Romania Airplay (Media Forest) Pierre de Maere version	6
Sweden (Sverigetopplistan)	54
UK Singles (Official Charts)	40
US Bubbling Under Hot 100 (Billboard)	1

2026 weekly chart performance
Chart (2026)	Peak position
Suriname (Nationale Top 40)	21

=== Monthly charts ===
Monthly chart performance
Chart (2024–2025)	Peak position
Lithuania Airplay (TopHit)	96
Romania Airplay (TopHit)	28
Romania Airplay (TopHit) Pierre de Maere version	69

=== Year-end charts ===
Year-end chart performance
Chart (2025)	Position
Argentina Anglo Airplay (Monitor Latino)	27
Belgium (Ultratop 50 Flanders)	17
Belgium (Ultratop 50 Wallonia)	56
Bolivia Airplay (Monitor Latino)	84
Canada AC (Billboard)	78
Romania Airplay (TopHit)	73

== Certifications ==
Certifications and sales
Region	Certification	Certified units/sales
Canada (Music Canada)	Gold	40,000^{‡}
France (SNEP)	Platinum	200,000^{‡}
United Kingdom (BPI)	Silver	200,000^{‡}
^{‡} Sales+streaming figures based on certification alone.
