= Illusion (Dua Lipa song) =

2024 single by Dua Lipa

Single by Dua Lipa

from the album Radical Optimism
- Released: 11 April 2024
- Recorded: 2023
- Genre: Club; psychedelic-dance
- Length: 3:08
- Label: Warner
- Songwriters: Dua Lipa; Kevin Parker; Danny L Harle; Caroline Ailin; Tobias Jesso Jr.
- Producers: Kevin Parker; Danny L Harle

Dua Lipa singles chronology
"Training Season" (2024)	"Illusion" (2024)	"Handlebars" (2025)

Audio sample
- "Illusion": file; help

Music video
- "Illusion" on YouTube

"Illusion" is a song by English singer Dua Lipa. It was released through Warner Records on 11 April 2024, as the third single from her third studio album, Radical Optimism (2024). A club and psychedelic-dance song containing 2000's dance-pop influences, it was written by Lipa along with Caroline Ailin, Tobias Jesso Jr., and its producers Danny L Harle and Kevin Parker. "Illusion" topped the US Dance/Electronic Songs chart and reached the top ten in the United Kingdom, Bulgaria, Croatia, Flanders, and the Commonwealth of Independent States.

== Background and release ==
In 2023, Dua Lipa announced that her third studio album would be releasing in 2024. She released the first single from the album, "Houdini", on 9 November 2023. She went on to release the second single, "Training Season", on 15 February 2024. On 13 March 2024, the singer announced the album, Radical Optimism, via an Instagram livestream; she confirmed its title, cover artwork and release date. The tracklist of the album was also revealed on the same day, with "Illusion" serving as the seventh track.

Lipa announced the release of "Illusion" as a single on 4 April 2024, via her social media accounts, along with its cover artwork and a 30-second snippet of the song. It was released on 11 April 2024, through Warner Records.

== Critical reception ==
Julia Koscelnik of V praised the song, stating that it "stands out as perhaps one of Lipa's best songs, showcasing the artist at her strongest". El Hunt of Evening Standard gave the song 3 out of 5 stars; she criticised the opening verse due to its "odd phrasing" but praised the chorus.

=== Year-end lists ===
Publication	List	Rank	Ref.
Billboard	The 100 Best Songs of 2024: Staff selection	57	

== Commercial performance ==
"Illusion" debuted at number 9 on the UK Singles Chart on 19 April 2024, becoming the third consecutive top-ten single from Radical Optimism. It entered the US Billboard Hot 100 at number 43 on the chart issued for 27 April 2024, and charted for 18 weeks before departing. Elsewhere, especially in Europe and Latin America, the song reached the top ten in Belgium, Bulgaria, Croatia, Honduras, Japan, Turkey and Russia, top twenty in Portugal, Panama, Paraguay, Lebanon, Ireland, Greece and El Salvador, top thirty in Australia, Canada, Norway, Sweden and Switzerland, top forty in Denmark, France, The Netherlands, New Zealand and Spain and top fifty in Slovakia, Czech Republic and Nigeria.

== Music video ==
The accompanying music video for "Illusion" was released alongside the song. It was directed by Tanu Muino and filmed at the Piscina Municipal de Montjuïc in Barcelona. Vogue Adria compared the music video to that for "Slow" (2003) by Kylie Minogue. Both videos feature the competition pool diving structure and surroundings of Piscina Municipal de Montjuïc against the backdrop of Barcelona.

== Track listing ==
- Digital download / streaming single
1. "Illusion" – 3:08
2. "Illusion" (extended) – 4:23
3. "Illusion" (instrumental) – 3:07
4. "Illusion" (a cappella) – 3:08
- Digital download / streaming single
1. "Illusion" (London sessions) – 3:12
- Digital download / streaming single
1. "Illusion" (Regard remix) – 3:20
- Digital download / streaming single
1. "Illusion" (The Blaze remix) – 4:10
2. "Illusion" (The Blaze extended remix) – 6:33
- Cassette / CD single
1. "Illusion" – 3:08
- 7-inch single
1. "Illusion" – 3:08
2. "Illusion" (instrumental) – 3:07
- Digital download / streaming single
1. "Illusion" (Logic1000 remix) – 3:19
2. "Illusion" (Logic1000 remix) [extended] – 5:01
- Digital download / streaming single
1. "Illusion" (Creepy Nuts remix) – 2:52
- Digital download / streaming single
1. "Illusion" (Honey Dijon remix) – 5:04
2. "Illusion" (Honey Dijon remix) [extended] – 6:56

== Charts ==
=== Weekly charts ===
Weekly chart performance for "Illusion"
Chart (2024)	Peak position
Argentina Hot 100 (Billboard)	81
Australia (ARIA)	21
Austria (Ö3 Austria Top 40)	61
Belarus Airplay (TopHit)	13
Belgium (Ultratop 50 Flanders)	10
Belgium (Ultratop 50 Wallonia)	15
Brazil Hot 100 (Billboard)	100
Bulgaria Airplay (PROPHON)	4
Canada Hot 100 (Billboard)	28
Canada AC (Billboard)	24
Canada CHR/Top 40 (Billboard)	11
Canada Hot AC (Billboard)	10
Chile Airplay (Monitor Latino)	14
CIS Airplay (TopHit)	10
Colombia (Monitor Latino)	14
Croatia International Airplay (Top lista)	4
Czech Republic Airplay (ČNS IFPI)	2
Czech Republic Singles Digital (ČNS IFPI)	45
Denmark (Tracklisten)	33
Estonia Airplay (TopHit)	13
El Salvador Airplay (Monitor Latino)	12
France (SNEP)	32
Germany (GfK)	76
Global 200 (Billboard)	15
Greece (IFPI)	12
Honduras (Monitor Latino)	10
Hungary (Editors' Choice Top 40)	16
Ireland (IRMA)	14
Italy (FIMI)	55
Japan Hot Overseas (Billboard Japan)	8
Kazakhstan Airplay (TopHit)	13
Lebanon (Lebanese Top 20)	14
Lithuania (AGATA)	26
Luxembourg (Billboard)	11
Moldova Airplay (TopHit)	98
Netherlands (Dutch Top 40)	17
Netherlands (Single Top 100)	38
New Zealand (Recorded Music NZ)	32
Nigeria (TurnTable Top 100)	48
Norway (VG-lista)	27
Panama (Monitor Latino)	12
Paraguay Airplay (Monitor Latino)	4
Poland (Polish Airplay Top 100)	4
Poland (Polish Streaming Top 100)	69
Portugal (AFP)	16
Romania Airplay (TopHit)	125
Russia Airplay (TopHit)	5
Slovakia Airplay (ČNS IFPI)	13
Slovakia Singles Digital (ČNS IFPI)	44
South Korea BGM (Circle)	73
South Korea Download (Circle)	112
Spain (Promusicae)	39
Sweden (Sverigetopplistan)	24
Switzerland (Schweizer Hitparade)	25
Turkey International Airplay (Radiomonitor Türkiye)	8
Ukraine Airplay (TopHit)	68
UK Singles (Official Charts)	9
US Billboard Hot 100	43
US Adult Contemporary (Billboard)	22
US Adult Pop Airplay (Billboard)	6
US Hot Dance/Electronic Songs (Billboard)	1
US Pop Airplay (Billboard)	7
Venezuela Airplay (Record Report)	25

=== Monthly charts ===
Monthly chart performance for "Illusion"
Chart (2024)	Peak position
Belarus Airplay (TopHit)	15
CIS Airplay (TopHit)	11
Czech Republic (Rádio – Top 100)	9
Estonia Airplay (TopHit)	16
Kazakhstan Airplay (TopHit)	20
Lithuania Airplay (TopHit)	13
Paraguay Airplay (SGP)	13
Russia Airplay (TopHit)	11
Slovakia (Rádio Top 100)	19
Ukraine Airplay (TopHit)	79

=== Year-end charts ===
2024 year-end chart performance for "Illusion"
Chart (2024)	Position
Belarus Airplay (TopHit)	37
Belgium (Ultratop 50 Flanders)	24
Belgium (Ultratop 50 Wallonia)	80
Canada (Canadian Hot 100)	95
CIS Airplay (TopHit)	28
Estonia Airplay (TopHit)	33
Iceland (Tónlistinn)	96
Lithuania Airplay (TopHit)	32
Netherlands (Dutch Top 40)	63
Russia Airplay (TopHit)	29
US Adult Top 40 (Billboard)	23
US Hot Dance/Electronic Songs (Billboard)	5
US Pop Airplay (Billboard)	28
US Radio Songs (Billboard)	58

2025 year-end chart performance for "Illusion"
Chart (2025)	Position
Argentina Anglo Airplay (Monitor Latino)	79
Belarus Airplay (TopHit)	153
Belgium (Ultratop 50 Flanders)	165
Chile Airplay (Monitor Latino)	98
Lithuania Airplay (TopHit)	97

== Certifications ==
Certifications for "Illusion"
Region	Certification	Certified units/sales
Australia (ARIA)	Platinum	70,000^{‡}
Belgium (BRMA)	Gold	20,000^{‡}
Brazil (Pro-Música Brasil)	3× Platinum	120,000^{‡}
Canada (Music Canada)	Platinum	80,000^{‡}
France (SNEP)	Platinum	200,000^{‡}
New Zealand (RMNZ)	Gold	15,000^{‡}
Poland (ZPAV)	Platinum	125,000^{‡}
Spain (Promusicae)	Gold	30,000^{‡}
United Kingdom (BPI)	Gold	400,000^{‡}
United States (RIAA)	Platinum	1,000,000^{‡}
^{‡} Sales+streaming figures based on certification alone.

== Release history ==
Release dates and format(s) for "Illusion"
Region	Date	Format(s)	Version	Label	Ref.
Various	11 April 2024	Digital download; streaming	Original; extended; instrumental; acapella	Warner	
United States	11 April 2024	Contemporary hit radio	Original	Warner	
Italy	12 April 2024	Radio airplay	Original	Warner	
Various	17 May 2024	Digital download; streaming	London sessions	Warner	
Various	7 June 2024	Digital download; streaming	Regard remix (Amazon Music exclusive) (Note: The Regard remix was released on all streaming and digital platforms on 27 September 2024.)	Warner	
Various	21 June 2024	Digital download; streaming	The Blaze remix	Warner	
Various	21 June 2024	Digital download; streaming	The Blaze extended remix	Warner	
Various	28 June 2024	7-inch single; cassette; CD	Original; instrumental (Note: Of the physical editions, only the 7-inch single includes the instrumental version.)	Warner	
Various	19 July 2024	Digital download; streaming	Logic1000 remix	Warner	
Various	19 July 2024	Digital download; streaming	Logic1000 remix extended	Warner	
Various	26 July 2024	Digital download; streaming	Creepy Nuts remix	Warner	
Various	2 August 2024	Digital download; streaming	Honey Dijon remix	Warner	
Various	2 August 2024	Digital download; streaming	Honey Dijon remix extended	Warner	

== See also ==
- List of Billboard number-one dance songs of 2024
