= Hot Dance/Electronic Songs =

Weekly music chart ranking dance and electronic songs

Hot Dance/Electronic Songs (formerly Dance/Electronic Songs) is a record chart that has been published weekly by Billboard since January 2013. It is their first chart to be published that ranks the most popular dance and electronic songs according to audience impressions, digital downloads, and streaming and it was introduced following an increase in the genre's popularity in the United States. The chart originally included reported club play.

The first number-one song on the chart, for the issue dated January 26, 2013, was "Scream & Shout" by will.i.am and Britney Spears. The chart's current number one as of the issue dated November 14, 2026, is "Dracula" remix by Tame Impala and Jennie.

== Background and eligibility criteria ==
As a result of the increase in the popularity of dance and electronic music, Billboard introduced the Dance/Electronic Songs chart in January 2013 to rank the most popular dance and electronic songs in the U.S. according to airplay audience impressions, digital downloads, streaming and reported club play and publishes it on a weekly basis. They are tracked by Nielsen SoundScan, Nielsen BDS, BDS from streaming services including Spotify and Xbox Music, and from a nationwide select panel of 140 DJs; outside of club play data, it uses the same methodology as the all-genre Billboard Hot 100. It became the first multi-metric dance chart since Billboard began tracking dance music in 1976, when the Dance Club Songs was created solely by club play data. Songs will be eligible to chart on the Dance/Electronic Songs chart based on their "core sound and tempo", however dance remixes of songs which were originally pop, R&B, rap or a different genre are not eligible for inclusion, regardless of whether it appears on either the Dance Club Songs or Dance/Mix Show Airplay charts. Descending songs are removed from the chart after 78 weeks if their ranking drops below number three.

In February 2013, Billboard announced that U.S. YouTube views would be incorporated into the chart's ranking. In January 2014, the chart's name was modified from "Dance/Electronic Songs" to "Hot Dance/Electronic Songs".

On December 10, 2024, Billboard announced that they would be revamping the chart in order to "better recognize the varied sounds" of the electronic music genre. As of the chart dated January 18, 2025, songs eligible to debut on the chart are those primarily recorded by DJs or producers, with an emphasis on electronic-based production. Billboard concurrently launched a sister chart, the Hot Dance/Pop Songs chart, which aims to feature tracks with more of a focus on vocals, melody, and hooks by artists not rooted in the dance genre. Songs co-billed to both a DJ/producer and a singer who extends beyond the dance genre may be eligible for both Hot Dance/Electronic Songs and Hot Dance/Pop Songs. At the same time as the revamping of the chart, the chart was reduced from 50 to 25 positions. Artists such as Charli XCX, bbno$ and Kesha, all of which had multiple songs on the Hot Dance/Electronic Songs on the issue dated January 11, 2025, were completely removed off the chart the next week and debuted on the Hot Dance/Pop Songs chart.

== Song achievements ==
=== Most weeks at number one ===
Weeks	Song	Artist	Year(s)	Source
69	"Happier"	Marshmello and Bastille	2018–20	
62	"Miles on It"	Marshmello and Kane Brown	2024–25	
55	"I'm Good (Blue)"	David Guetta and Bebe Rexha	2022–23	
44	"Dracula"	Tame Impala	2025–2026	
36	"Cold Heart (Pnau Remix)"	Elton John, Dua Lipa and Pnau	2021–22	
33	"The Middle"	Zedd, Maren Morris and Grey	2018	
27	"Closer"	The Chainsmokers featuring Halsey	2016–17	
26	"Wake Me Up"	Avicii	2013–14	
25	"Something Just Like This"	The Chainsmokers and Coldplay	2017	
24	"No Broke Boys"	Disco Lines and Tinashe	2025–26	

== Artist achievements ==
=== Artists with most number-one songs ===
Artists with at least two number-ones
Position	Artist name	Tally of number-ones	Ref.
1	The Chainsmokers	6	
2	Calvin Harris	4	
2	Zedd	4	
2	Marshmello	4	
3	Lady Gaga	3	
3	Ariana Grande	3	
3	Dua Lipa	3	
4	Avicii	2	
4	DJ Snake	2	
4	Major Lazer	2	
4	Elton John	2	
4	Britney Spears	2	
4	Justin Bieber	2	
4	MØ	2	
4	Pharrell Williams	2	
4	Selena Gomez	2	
4	David Guetta	2	
4	Bebe Rexha	2	
4	Charli XCX	2	

=== Artists with most weeks at number-one on the chart ===
Position	Artist name	Weeks	Ref.
1	Marshmello	143	
2	The Chainsmokers	82	
3	Bastille	69	
4	David Guetta	66	
5	Bebe Rexha	66	
6	Kane Brown	62	
7	Zedd	55	
8	Dua Lipa	55	
9	Tame Impala	44	
10	Elton John	37	

=== Artists with most top-tens on the chart ===
Position	Artist name	Entries	Ref.
1	David Guetta	30	
2	Kygo	27	
3	Calvin Harris	26	
4	The Chainsmokers	26	
5	Marshmello	22	
6	Charli XCX	15	
7	Zedd	13	
8	Avicii	12	
9	DJ Snake	11	
10	Tiësto	11	

=== Artists with most entries on the chart ===
Position	Artist name	Entries	Ref.
1	David Guetta	100	
2	Marshmello	80	
3	Skrillex	71	
4	Kygo	70	
5	The Chainsmokers	70	
6	Illenium	69	
7	Martin Garrix	61	
8	Tiësto	57	
9	Calvin Harris	57	
10	Diplo	53	

== Milestones ==
- Rihanna holds the record for the most songs (6) simultaneously in the top 10, with "We Found Love", "Only Girl (In the World)", "Don't Stop the Music", "Where Have You Been", "S&M" and "Disturbia" during the week of February 25, 2023.
- DJ Snake holds the milestone as the first artist to have a song positioned at No. 1 on the Year End chart two years straight with "Turn Down for What" featuring Lil Jon in 2014 and "Lean On" with Major Lazer featuring MØ in 2015. The Chainsmokers later replicated this with "Don't Let Me Down" featuring Daya and "Something Just Like This" with Coldplay topping the Year End chart in 2016 and 2017 respectively.
- Bebe Rexha holds the record for the longest-charting female artist on the ranking.
- "Latch" by Disclosure featuring Sam Smith holds the record for longest climb to number one, reaching the top in its 47th week on the chart.
- "Happier" by Marshmello and Bastille holds the record for most weeks spent on the chart at 92 weeks. It also is the first song to top the chart for a complete year (2019).
- "Stupid Love" by Lady Gaga became the first song to debut at number one on the chart during the week of March 14, 2020.
- Lady Gaga's album Chromatica became the first album to have 5 songs in the top 10 for the week of June 13, 2020.
- "Pepas" by Farruko became the first Spanish-language song to reach number one on the chart for the week of August 21, 2021.
- Skrillex became the first artist to have twenty songs on the chart in one chart week.
- Dua Lipa became the first female artist to simultaneously rule the top 3 on the chart for the week of April 27, 2024 with "Illusion," "Houdini," and "Training Season." She also became the first artist to rule the top 3 for multiple weeks. She is also the first female artist to replace themselves at number one and the first to do so multiple times and in consecutive weeks.
- In 2024 Marshmello became the first artist to spend a total of 100 weeks at the top spot.
- In 2026 David Guetta became the first artist to have 100 entries on the Hot Dance/Electronic songs chart.

== See also ==
- List of artists who reached number one on the Hot Dance/Electronic Songs
