= Houdini (Dua Lipa song) =

Single by Dua Lipa

from the album Radical Optimism
- Written: November 2022 – January 2023 (Note: For Rolling Stone, Lipa said that she began working on "Houdini" after she heard a snippet of a track that Kevin Parker was making in November 2022. They polished and finalised the song in January 2023.)
- Released: 9 November 2023
- Genre: Nu-disco; post-disco; psychedelic pop
- Length: 3:06
- Label: Warner
- Songwriters: Dua Lipa; Kevin Parker; Danny L Harle; Caroline Ailin; Tobias Jesso Jr.
- Producers: Kevin Parker; Danny L Harle

Dua Lipa singles chronology
"Dance the Night" (2023)	"Houdini" (2023)	"Training Season" (2024)

Audio sample
- "Houdini": file; help

Music video
- "Houdini" on YouTube

"Houdini" is a song by English singer Dua Lipa. It was released on 9 November 2023 through Warner Records, as the lead single from Lipa's third studio album, Radical Optimism (2024). The song was produced by Danny L Harle and Kevin Parker. Lipa co-wrote the song with Harle, Parker, Caroline Ailin and Tobias Jesso Jr.

"Houdini" was met with critical acclaim by music critics, who praised the sonic evolution from her previous album Future Nostalgia (2020). Commercially, the song peaked at number one in the Flanders and Wallonia regions of Belgium. It reached number two on the UK Singles Chart and the top 10 in various countries, including Canada, Australia, Ireland, Germany, Switzerland and France. In the United States, the song peaked at number 11 on the Billboard Hot 100 and topped the Dance/Electronic Songs chart for 17 weeks. "Houdini" also peaked at number three on the Billboard Global 200. It became both a critical and commercial success.

The song and music video won multiple awards, including Top Dance/Electronic Song at the 2024 Billboard Music Awards, Best Choreography at the 2024 MTV Video Music Awards, and Most Performed Australian Work and Most Performed Pop Work at the APRA Music Awards of 2025.

== Background and release ==
In 2023, Lipa announced that her upcoming third studio album would be released sometime in 2024. She shared that she had embraced 1970s-era psychedelia by working with Tame Impala's Kevin Parker, also hinting that the album would see a shift from the disco-influenced sound of Future Nostalgia. "Houdini" began as a demo produced by Parker sometime in or before November 2022. After hearing a snippet of the track, Lipa began writing the lyrics with Caroline Ailin before finalising it with Parker in January 2023. Ailin, Lipa, Parker, Danny L Harle, and Tobias Jesso Jr. all share writing credits on the song.

In May 2023, Lipa released "Dance the Night" as the lead single from the soundtrack for Greta Gerwig's film, Barbie in which she also made her acting debut. The song peaked at number one in the UK and reached the top 10 in the US, Australia, Germany, France, Canada, and various other countries. After having deleted all of her Instagram posts in October 2023, Lipa posted a picture of herself with red hair captioned "miss me?". On 27 October, she shared a close-up picture of a key between her teeth, accompanied by the phrase "catch me or I go". In anticipation of the song, Lipa replaced the cover art of her previous albums with kaleidoscopic versions on streaming services.

Lipa posted a teaser of the song on her social media on 31 October 2023, hinting at the song title in the post. A rearranged combination of numbers would spell out the title "Houdini", named after escape artist Harry Houdini. Fans of Lipa also drew parallels to English singer Kate Bush's 1982 song of the same name, who also references Houdini by presenting a key in her mouth on the cover of her album The Dreaming (1982). The following day, she announced that the song would be released on 9 November 2023 and made it available for pre-order and pre-save via her website and various streaming services.

== Live performances ==
Dua Lipa released a live recording of the song titled London Sessions for digital download and streaming on 12 January 2024. A music video of the live performance was released on YouTube the same day.

She first performed the song on live television at the 66th Annual Grammy Awards on 4 February 2024, along with "Dance the Night" and her then-upcoming single, "Training Season".

It was then included as the last song in the set list for the Radical Optimism Tour.

== Critical reception ==
"Houdini" was met with widespread critical acclaim from music critics. Helen Brown from The Independent gave the song five out of five stars, mentioning that although "there's some daftness in the lyrics, (...) pop is no place for pedantry —especially not when it comes to a singer whose lockdown hit, 'Levitating', saw her laughing in the face of gravity". Rhian Daly from NME gave the song four out of five stars, writing that "while she might be switching up her sonic palette, there's one thing you can rely on Dua to be consistent with —giving us confidence-filled bops that help us unlock the best versions of ourselves, even if just for three minutes".

Betsy Reed from The Guardian also gave the song four out of five stars, stating that "it's ferociously catchy without being bludgeoning, and does a more convincing job of combining her appreciation for vintage sonics with diamond-tooled pop songwriting than Future Nostalgia did. For Lipa, being a pop star clearly is still the main event, and 'Houdini' suggests no threat to her dominance". Variety's Jem Aswad declared the song a "banger" and "both a progression from and a continuation of Future Nostalgia", describing it as "more melodically nuanced" than her prior album's singles. Similarly, Kaelen Bell of Exclaim! shared that the song retained Dua Lipa's disco-pop sensibilities yet was "sweatier and grimier than the neon-lit enormity of 'Levitating' and 'Don't Start Now.'"

Writing for Clash, Robin Murray said that the song is "Dua Lipa doing what she does best —a gleaming, sun-drenched pop star who yearns to dominate huge spaces." Writing for Pitchfork, Shaad D'Souza mentioned that the song "doesn't reinvent the wheel: Lipa taunts a man into proving he deserves her attention, squarely in the brazen, invulnerable Future Nostalgia mode. But production from Kevin Parker and Danny L Harle provides some of the drive and loony spark that was missing from Lipa's club tracks thus far".

=== Year-end lists ===
Publication	List	Rank	Ref.
NME	The 50 Best Songs of 2023	31	
Rolling Stone	The 100 Best Songs of 2023	36	
USA Today	Best Songs of 2023	—N/a	

== Commercial performance ==
"Houdini" was a global success and became Lipa's fourteenth top ten single on the UK Singles Chart, receiving a platinum certification from the British Phonographic Industry.

Internationally, the song peaked at number one in the Flanders and Wallonia regions of Belgium. It become Lipa's sixth number one in Flanders and fourth in Wallonia. The song also topped the singles charts in Bulgaria, Croatia, Czech Republic, Estonia, Greece, Paraguay, Russia and San Marino. Additionally, it reached the top ten in Canada, Australia, Ireland, Hungary, Bolivia and Japan.

In Switzerland, the song debuted at number three, becoming Lipa's seventh top ten, and remained on the chart for 31 weeks. The song was later certified platinum for 30,000 units sold. In Germany, the song debuted at number 17, her highest debut since "Scared to Be Lonely" with Martin Garrix, before reaching the top ten, at number 9, becoming her eighth top-ten in the country, and charted for 40 weeks. The song was later certified gold for 300,000 units sold.

In France, the song debuted at number 7, becoming Lipa's fifth top ten in the country, and charted for 66 weeks, becoming Lipa's fourth longest-running song in the country. The song was later certified diamond in the country for selling 333,000 units, becoming her eleventh diamond single there.

In United States, the song charted in the top twenty on the Billboard Hot 100 debuting and peaking at number 11 and topped the US Hot Dance/Electronic Songs for 17 weeks, becoming Lipa's second longest-running song on the chart after Cold Heart (Pnau Remix), which stayed 36 weeks.

== Music video ==
The music video for "Houdini" was directed by Manu Cossu and released alongside the song. It is set in a dance studio, where a redheaded Lipa performs a choreography with a group of redheaded male dancers. According to Vogue, the video appears to be a reference to the video for "Hung Up" (2005) by Madonna. The music video won Best Choreography at the 2024 MTV Video Music Awards.

== Track listing ==
- Cassette / CD / digital download / streaming
1. "Houdini" – 3:05
- Digital download – extended edit
1. "Houdini" (extended edit) – 5:53
- Streaming – extended edit
1. "Houdini" (extended edit) – 5:53
2. "Houdini" – 3:05
- Digital download – Adam Port mix
1. "Houdini" (Adam Port mix) – 3:22
- Streaming – Adam Port mix
1. "Houdini" (Adam Port mix) – 3:22
2. "Houdini" – 3:05
3. "Houdini" (extended edit) – 5:53
- 7-inch single
1. "Houdini"
2. "Houdini" (instrumental)
- Digital download – Adam Port mix [extended]
1. "Houdini" (Adam Port mix) [extended] – 4:10
- Digital download – London sessions
1. "Houdini" (London sessions) – 3:02
- Streaming – London sessions
1. "Houdini" (London sessions) – 3:02
2. "Houdini" – 3:05
3. "Houdini" (Adam Port mix) – 3:22
4. "Houdini" (extended edit) – 5:53
- Digital download – Danny L Harle 'slowride' mix
1. "Houdini" (Danny L Harle slowride mix) – 3:05
- Streaming – Danny L Harle 'slowride' mix
1. "Houdini" (Danny L Harle 'slowride' mix) – 3:05
2. "Houdini" (London sessions) – 3:02
3. "Houdini" – 3:05
4. "Houdini" (Adam Port mix) – 3:22
5. "Houdini" (extended edit) – 5:53

== Credits and personnel ==
These credits are adapted from YouTube.

- Dua Lipa – vocals, songwriting, lyrics, melodies
- Kevin Parker – backing vocals, songwriting, production, arrangement, engineering, programming, bass guitar, drums, guitar, keyboards, percussion, sound effects
- Danny L Harle – backing vocals, songwriting, production, arrangement, synthesiser, drum programming
- Caroline Ailin – backing vocals, songwriting, vocal production, lyrics, melodies
- Tobias Jesso Jr. – backing vocals, songwriting, melodies
- Cameron Gower Pool – vocal production, engineering
- Josh Gudwin – mixing
- Chris Gehringer – mastering

== Charts ==
=== Weekly charts ===
Weekly chart performance
Chart (2023–2025)	Peak position
Argentina Hot 100 (Billboard)	59
Australia (ARIA)	7
Austria (Ö3 Austria Top 40)	14
Belarus Airplay (TopHit)	1
Belgium (Ultratop 50 Flanders)	1
Belgium (Ultratop 50 Wallonia)	1
Bolivia Airplay (Monitor Latino)	10
Brazil Hot 100 (Billboard)	54
Bulgaria Airplay (PROPHON)	1
Canada Hot 100 (Billboard)	5
Canada AC (Billboard)	1
Canada CHR/Top 40 (Billboard)	2
Canada Hot AC (Billboard)	2
Chile Airplay (Monitor Latino)	2
CIS Airplay (TopHit)	1
Colombia Anglo (Monitor Latino)	1
Croatia (Billboard)	23
Croatia International Airplay (Top lista)	1
Czech Republic Airplay (ČNS IFPI)	1
Czech Republic Singles Digital (ČNS IFPI)	32
Denmark (Tracklisten)	17
Ecuador Airplay (Monitor Latino)	9
Estonia Airplay (TopHit)	1
Finland (Suomen virallinen lista)	31
France (SNEP)	7
Germany (GfK)	9
Global 200 (Billboard)	3
Greece International (IFPI)	1
Hungary (Dance Top 40)	4
Hungary (Rádiós Top 40)	4
Hungary (Single Top 40)	9
Iceland (Tónlistinn)	18
Ireland (IRMA)	6
Italy (FIMI)	17
Japan Hot Overseas (Billboard Japan)	2
Kazakhstan Airplay (TopHit)	2
Latvia Airplay (LaIPA)	1
Latvia Streaming (LaIPA)	12
Lebanon (Lebanese Top 20)	3
Lithuania (AGATA)	5
Luxembourg (Billboard)	3
Middle East and North Africa (IFPI)	12
Moldova Airplay (TopHit)	20
Netherlands (Dutch Top 40)	2
Netherlands (Single Top 100)	8
New Zealand (Recorded Music NZ)	13
Nicaragua Airplay (Monitor Latino)	11
Nigeria (TurnTable Top 100)	30
Norway (VG-lista)	11
Panama (Produce)	3
Paraguay Airplay (Monitor Latino)	1
Poland (Polish Airplay Top 100)	1
Poland (Polish Streaming Top 100)	13
Portugal (AFP)	13
Romania Airplay (Media Forest)	2
Romania TV Airplay (Media Forest)	3
Russia Airplay (TopHit)	1
Serbia Airplay (Radiomonitor)	3
Singapore (RIAS)	24
Slovakia Airplay (ČNS IFPI)	1
Slovakia Singles Digital (ČNS IFPI)	9
South Africa Airplay (TOSAC)	2
South Korea Download (Circle)	125
Spain (Promusicae)	24
Sweden (Sverigetopplistan)	13
Switzerland (Schweizer Hitparade)	3
Turkey International Airplay (Radiomonitor Türkiye)	1
Ukraine Airplay (TopHit)	13
United Arab Emirates (IFPI)	11
UK Singles (Official Charts)	2
Uruguay Airplay (Monitor Latino)	13
US Billboard Hot 100	11
US Adult Contemporary (Billboard)	8
US Adult Pop Airplay (Billboard)	5
US Hot Dance/Electronic Songs (Billboard)	1
US Pop Airplay (Billboard)	6
US Rhythmic Airplay (Billboard)	34
Venezuela (Record Report)	35

=== Monthly charts ===
Chart (2023–2024)	Peak position
Belarus Airplay (TopHit)	3
CIS Airplay (TopHit)	1
Czech Republic (Rádio – Top 100)	1
Czech Republic (Singles Digitál – Top 100)	34
Estonia Airplay (TopHit)	1
Kazakhstan Airplay (TopHit)	2
Latvia Airplay (TopHit)	25
Lithuania Airplay (TopHit)	1
Moldova Airplay (TopHit)	23
Paraguay Airplay (SGP)	10
Romania Airplay (TopHit)	15
Russia Airplay (TopHit)	3
Slovakia (Rádio – Top 100)	1
Slovakia (Singles Digitál – Top 100)	13
Ukraine Airplay (TopHit)	16

=== Year-end charts ===
2023 year-end chart performance
Chart (2023)	Position
CIS Airplay (TopHit)	131
Estonia Airplay (TopHit)	98
Lithuania Airplay (TopHit)	129
Netherlands (Dutch Top 40)	69
Russia Airplay (TopHit)	197

2024 year-end chart performance
Chart (2024)	Position
Australia (ARIA)	53
Austria (Ö3 Austria Top 40)	73
Belarus Airplay (TopHit)	15
Belgium (Ultratop 50 Flanders)	19
Belgium (Ultratop 50 Wallonia)	11
Bulgaria Airplay (PROPHON)	6
Canada (Canadian Hot 100)	18
CIS Airplay (TopHit)	6
Denmark (Tracklisten)	70
Estonia Airplay (TopHit)	22
France (SNEP)	30
Germany (GfK)	35
Global 200 (Billboard)	37
Hungary (Dance Top 40)	9
Hungary (Rádiós Top 40)	8
Iceland (Tónlistinn)	62
Kazakhstan Airplay (TopHit)	16
Lithuania Airplay (TopHit)	7
Netherlands (Dutch Top 40)	25
Netherlands (Single Top 100)	46
Poland (Polish Airplay Top 100)	9
Poland (Polish Streaming Top 100)	59
Russia Airplay (TopHit)	38
Switzerland (Schweizer Hitparade)	59
UK Singles (OCC)	41
US Billboard Hot 100	43
US Adult Contemporary (Billboard)	13
US Adult Top 40 (Billboard)	14
US Hot Dance/Electronic Songs (Billboard)	1
US Pop Airplay (Billboard)	18

2025 year-end chart performance
Chart (2025)	Position
Argentina Anglo Airplay (Monitor Latino)	35
Belarus Airplay (TopHit)	101
Belgium (Ultratop 50 Flanders)	144
Chile Airplay (Monitor Latino)	75
CIS Airplay (TopHit)	110
Hungary (Dance Top 40)	30
Hungary (Rádiós Top 40)	34
Lithuania Airplay (TopHit)	69
Poland (Polish Airplay Top 100)	61
US Adult Contemporary (Billboard)	25

== Certifications ==
Certifications and sales
Region	Certification	Certified units/sales
Australia (ARIA)	2× Platinum	140,000^{‡}
Austria (IFPI Austria)	Gold	15,000^{‡}
Belgium (BRMA)	Platinum	40,000^{‡}
Brazil (Pro-Música Brasil)	Diamond	160,000^{‡}
Canada (Music Canada)	4× Platinum	320,000^{‡}
Denmark (IFPI Danmark)	Platinum	90,000^{‡}
France (SNEP)	Diamond	333,333^{‡}
Germany (BVMI)	Gold	300,000^{‡}
Italy (FIMI)	Platinum	100,000^{‡}
New Zealand (RMNZ)	2× Platinum	60,000^{‡}
Poland (ZPAV)	3× Platinum	150,000^{‡}
Portugal (AFP)	2× Platinum	20,000^{‡}
Spain (Promusicae)	Platinum	60,000^{‡}
Switzerland (IFPI Switzerland)	Platinum	30,000^{‡}
United Kingdom (BPI)	Platinum	600,000^{‡}
United States (RIAA)	2× Platinum	2,000,000^{‡}
^{‡} Sales+streaming figures based on certification alone.

== Release history ==
Region	Date	Format(s)	Version	Label	Ref.
Various	9 November 2023	Digital download; streaming	Original	Warner	
France	10 November 2023	Radio airplay	Original	Warner	
Italy	10 November 2023	Radio airplay	Original	Warner	
United Kingdom	13 November 2023	Cassette; CD	Original	Warner	
United States	13 November 2023	Hot adult contemporary radio	Original	Warner	
United States	14 November 2023	Contemporary hit radio	Original	Warner	
Various	1 December 2023	Digital download; streaming	Extended edit	Warner	
Various	22 December 2023	Digital download; streaming	Adam Port mix	Warner	
Europe	29 December 2023	7-inch single; cassette; CD	Original; instrumental (Note: The instrumental version of "Houdini" was released on the 7-inch single only.)	Warner	
United Kingdom	29 December 2023	7-inch single; cassette; CD	Original; instrumental	Warner	
Various	8 January 2024	Digital download; streaming	Adam Port mix extended	Warner	
Various	12 January 2024	Digital download; streaming	London sessions	Warner	
Various	19 January 2024	Digital download; streaming	Danny L Harle 'slowride' mix	Warner	
United States	2 February 2024	7-inch single; cassette; CD	Original; instrumental	Warner	

== See also ==
- List of Billboard number-one dance songs of 2024
