= Radical Optimism Tour =

2024–2025 concert tour by Dua Lipa

- Tour by Dua Lipa
- Example promotional poster
- Location: Asia; Europe; North America; Oceania; South America
- Associated album: Radical Optimism
- Start date: 5 November 2024
- End date: 5 December 2025
- No. of shows: 81
- Supporting acts: Kita Alexander; Dove Cameron; Cil; Bu Cuarón; Merk & Kremont; Princesa Alba; Alessi Rose; Yami Safdie
- Producer: Live Nation
- Attendance: 1.865 million
- Box office: $214.3 million

Dua Lipa concert chronology
- Future Nostalgia Tour (2022); Radical Optimism Tour (2024–2025)

The Radical Optimism Tour was the third concert tour by English singer Dua Lipa in support of her third studio album, Radical Optimism (2024). The tour commenced in Singapore on 5 November 2024 and concluded in Mexico City, Mexico, on 5 December 2025, consisting of 81 shows. It featured headlining performances at various festivals, including ZFIC and I-Days Milano, as well as Lipa's own music festival, Sunny Hill, which takes place in Pristina, Kosovo.

An updated version of the tour was produced months after the shows held in Asia during late 2024, being divided into four sections and an encore with the four classical elements as the central key of the concert production. The set list primarily consisted of songs from Radical Optimism, with some others from her 2017 eponymous debut studio album and Future Nostalgia (2020), while the tour's wardrobe included custom outfits by the Attico, Balenciaga, Chanel, Jean Paul Gaultier, and Valentino.

The tour received highly positive reviews from critics, who praised Lipa's performance skills, vocal delivery, and charisma during interaction sections of the show with the audience. The Radical Optimism Tour also experienced commercial success, earning US$141.1 million within its first 59 concerts and thus becoming the highest-grossing tour of the singer to date, according to sales reports provided by Billboard. Lipa's shows in December 2025 at Estadio GNP Seguros in Mexico City were recorded for a concert film titled Live from Mexico, published on 21 May 2026 on her YouTube channel.

== Background ==
On 19 March 2024, Lipa announced four promotional standalone shows and several summer festival appearances across Europe, with ticketing going on sale on 21 March, in addition to US performances at the iHeartRadio and Austin City Limits music festivals in September and October, respectively. On 28 May 2024, she announced the tour, with dates for concerts in Asia scheduled for that same year's last two months; tickets went on sale on 11 June.

On 1 July 2024, Lipa announced her first-ever headlining show at Wembley Stadium, London. Ticketing became available on 12 July, and an additional show in the same venue was announced right after the first one was sold out. On 12 September, she announced concert dates for the tour in Oceania, Europe, and North America. Artist pre-sale and general sale were announced at the same time. Six days later, additional dates in Australia, New Zealand, France, Belgium, the UK, and the US were announced, due to high demand. On 8 November 2024, she announced her concert in Jakarta for the following day was cancelled, citing safety concerns pertaining to the show's staging. Moreover, Lipa was announced as the headliner for the 2024 edition of the Zomato Feeding India Concert, as well as for the 2025 lineups of I-Days Milano and the Kosovo-based Sunny Hill, her own organised music festival jointly with her father, Dukagjin Lipa.

In March 2025, Kita Alexander was announced as the supporting act for shows in Australia and New Zealand. On 1 April 2025, eight stadium concerts in the Latin America region were announced. After selling out her shows in Santiago, Buenos Aires and Mexico City, new shows were announced in those cities, respectively. That same month, Alessi Rose was announced as a supporting act for several European concerts; Dove Cameron also served as a supporting act alongside Rose on select dates. Merk & Kremont served as co-supporting acts during the 7 June concert in Milan, Italy, alongside Rose. Cil served as the supporting act for the North American concerts. The supporting acts for select South American concerts were revealed in November: Yami Safdie in Buenos Aires and Princesa Alba in Santiago. Bu Cuarón, daughter of the Mexican filmmaker Alfonso Cuarón, performed as the supporting act for the final concert of the tour in Mexico City.

== Production ==
=== Staging ===
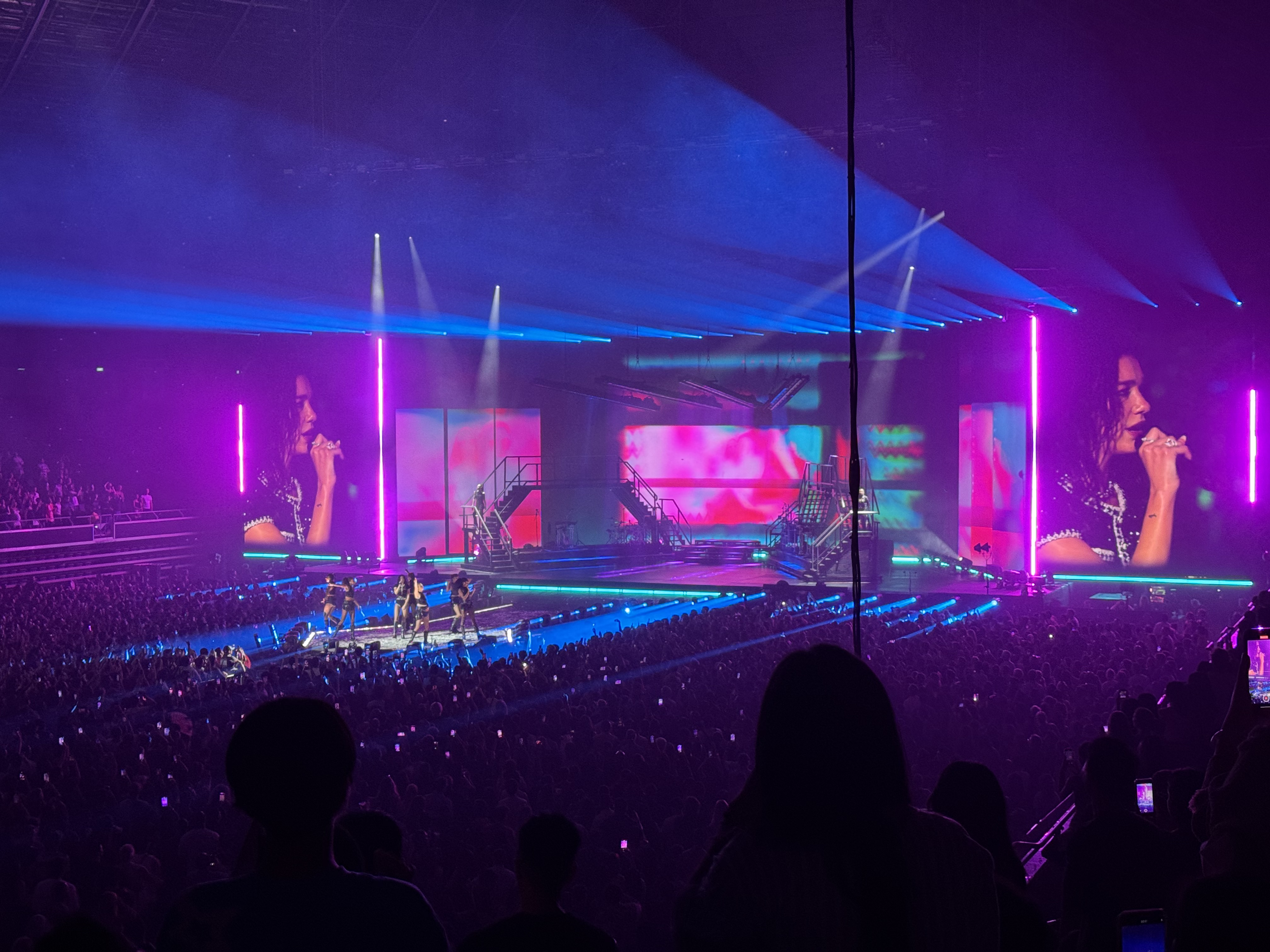
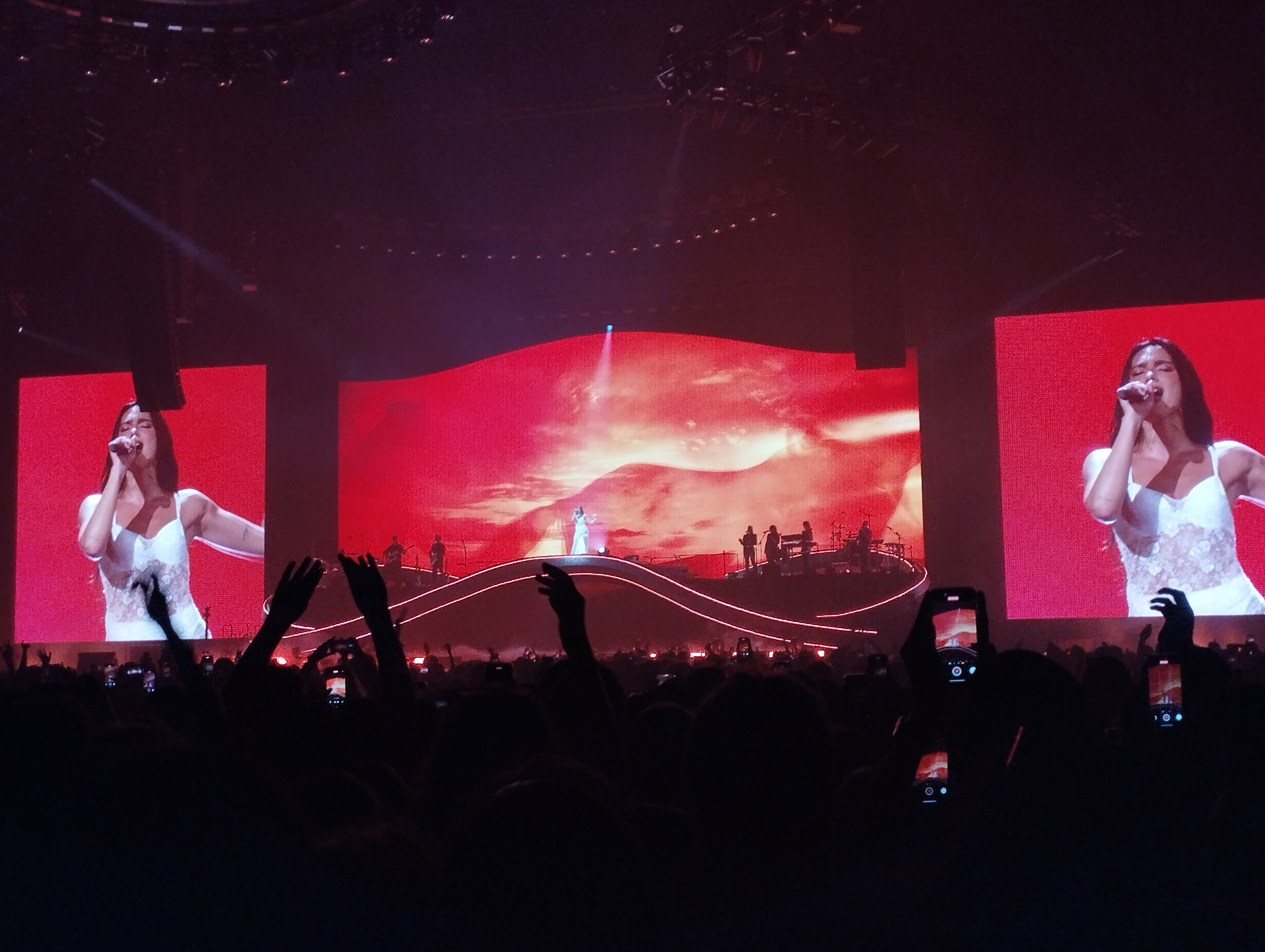
The main stage production initially consisted of two staircase structures as in the 2024 Asian leg (left), while being revamped for the 2025 shows with an infinity symbol-shaped platform (right).

The Asia leg of the tour featured an extended main stage with two staircase structures and a backdrop including a scenic video facade, risers for her band, and an integrated lift, which allowed for dynamic entrances and transitions. The stage design for the 2025 dates was developed by American company Tait Towers, resembling the infinity symbol, with the main stage having a curved shape and platforms that evoke ocean waves. At the back of the stage there was an integrated widescreen curved at the top edge that projected visuals such as water, light, and different landscapes throughout the show. Secondary circular stages were located closer to the audience for parts of the concert that allowed greater "intimacy and interactivity", as the C-stage additionally consisted of two scissor lifts that raised Lipa to about 14.5 ft (4.4 m), and during indoor arena shows, a "floating platform" was positioned in the center of automated rings.

Meanwhile, Charm La'Donna served as choreographer, the tour's production design was handled by Matt Pitman of Pixelmappers, and video graphics based on the four elements mixed with natural and "surreal" landscapes were created by Luke Halls Studio. Cinema cameras such as the Panasonic PLV100, Sony FR7 mounted on tracks ("Waterbird tracks") and Autopod systems for dynamic camera movements were used. The Disguise GX3 Media Servers and Atmos Shogun Studio 2 were employed to control LED lighting, effects, and synchronisation. For audio engineering, a Neve 5045 system was applied on every vocal channel to tame any potential feedback problems, and Shelford Channel microphones inserted with the Red Silk feature enhanced the harmonic content generated by the highs and high-mids. Pyrotechnics, confetti cannons, smoke, and other special effects were also used.

=== Fashion and styling ===
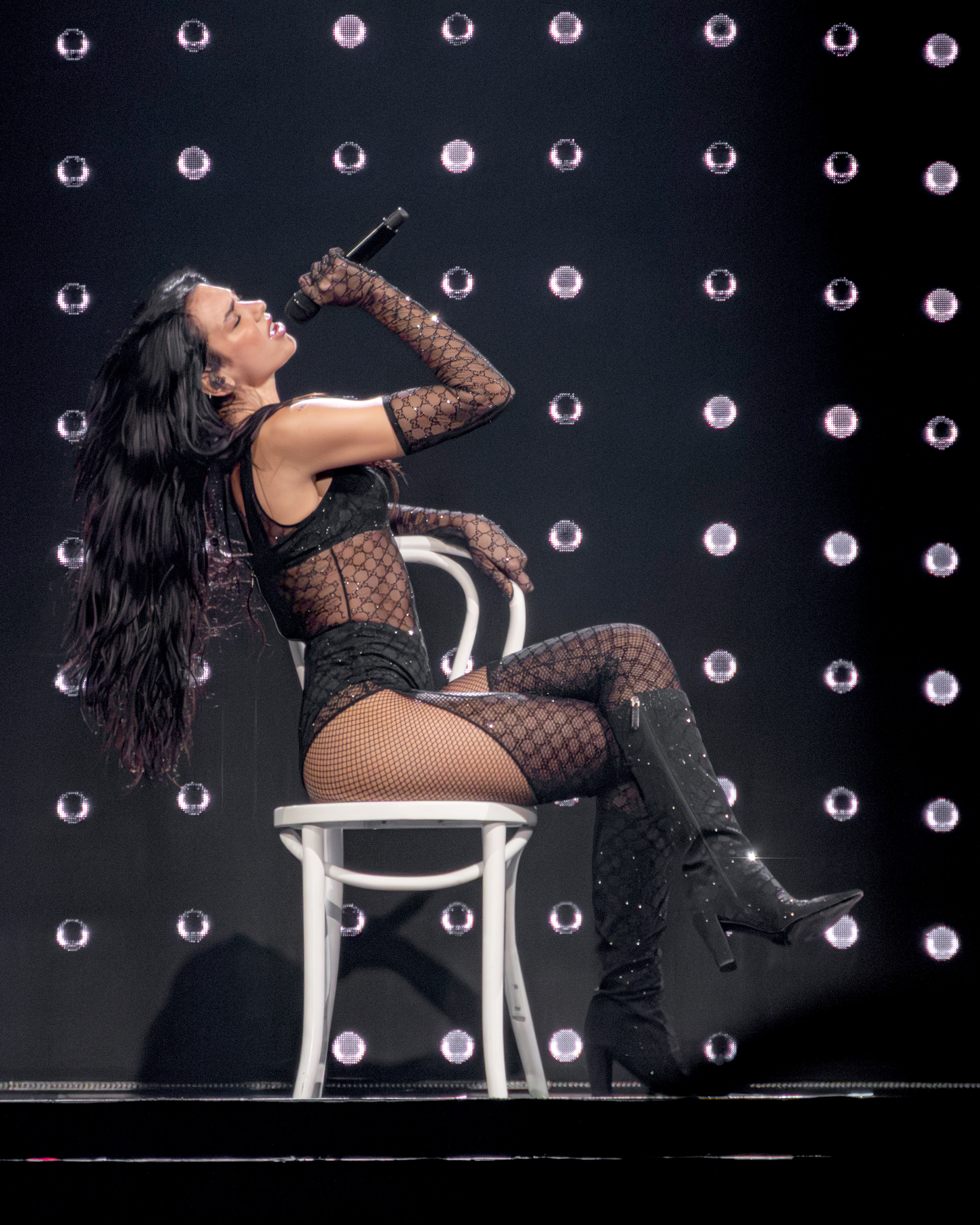
Lipa wearing a Gucci bikini underneath sheer and lace fabric on select dates

From the Oceania leg onwards, Lipa presented a wardrobe of five outfits styled by Lorenzo Posocco, which represented each act of the concert. During an interview with Teen Vogue, Posocco expressed his desire for Lipa to feel "extremely sexy and strong at the same time" and explained that he came up with the fashion by focusing on the set list of the show: "A live show is usually divided into different moments, and that's what gives you the number of looks." He further described the creative wardrobe process as his favourite: "I'm not a fan of costumes—I want to see fashion houses living on stage." While coming up with the footwear, Posocco had to consider ankle support for the singer to accomplish the choreography routine, with Lipa admitting that it helped her to feel confident onstage up to a level in which "[she] can do anything in a heel."

For the first act, Lipa wore a Jean Paul Gaultier satin corset featuring a sheer fabric halter neckline, with visible seams and boning, both adorned with Swarovski crystals, paired with matching fishnet stockings and mid-calf boots custom-made by Paris Texas. The second outfit comprised a customised, long-sleeved lace jumpsuit by Valentino, paired with a faux fur coat and complemented by matching boots from Christian Louboutin. The third look was a tailored bustier mini dress by the Attico with exposed boning at the back and a layer of textured floral lace at the front, cascading over fringe with sparkling crystals, completed with custom-made boots by Paris Texas. Lipa also wore a sheer lingerie dress by Balenciaga, a personalised rendition of a design from the fashion house's spring/summer 2025 collection, featuring the lace main piece and a matching giant faux fur coat. The fifth and final outfit was a Chanel bodysuit adorned with gold chains, paying homage to a dress presented during the spring/summer 1992–1993 haute couture show.

Additional clothing featured a Schiaparelli bodysuit designed by Daniel Roseberry, which was adorned with trompe-l'œil beads and complemented by a matching necklace crafted from pearls and crystals; a Gucci ensemble featuring a black bikini layered beneath sheer lace fabric, accompanied by gloves and a delicate fuzzy scarf; and a Courrèges short bodysuit made of leather, paired with gloves and boots adorned with rhinestone embellishments. Correspondingly, all aspects of beauty styling were in harmony with the fashion rhythm of the wardrobe. The hairstyle, styled by Peter Lux, was blown out, voluminous, and sexy, as requested by Lipa, who stated: "The sweatier I get, the better it works." Meanwhile, Katie Jane Hughes' disco-inspired makeup consistently highlighted a glossy shine on the lips as a key feature.

== Concert synopsis ==
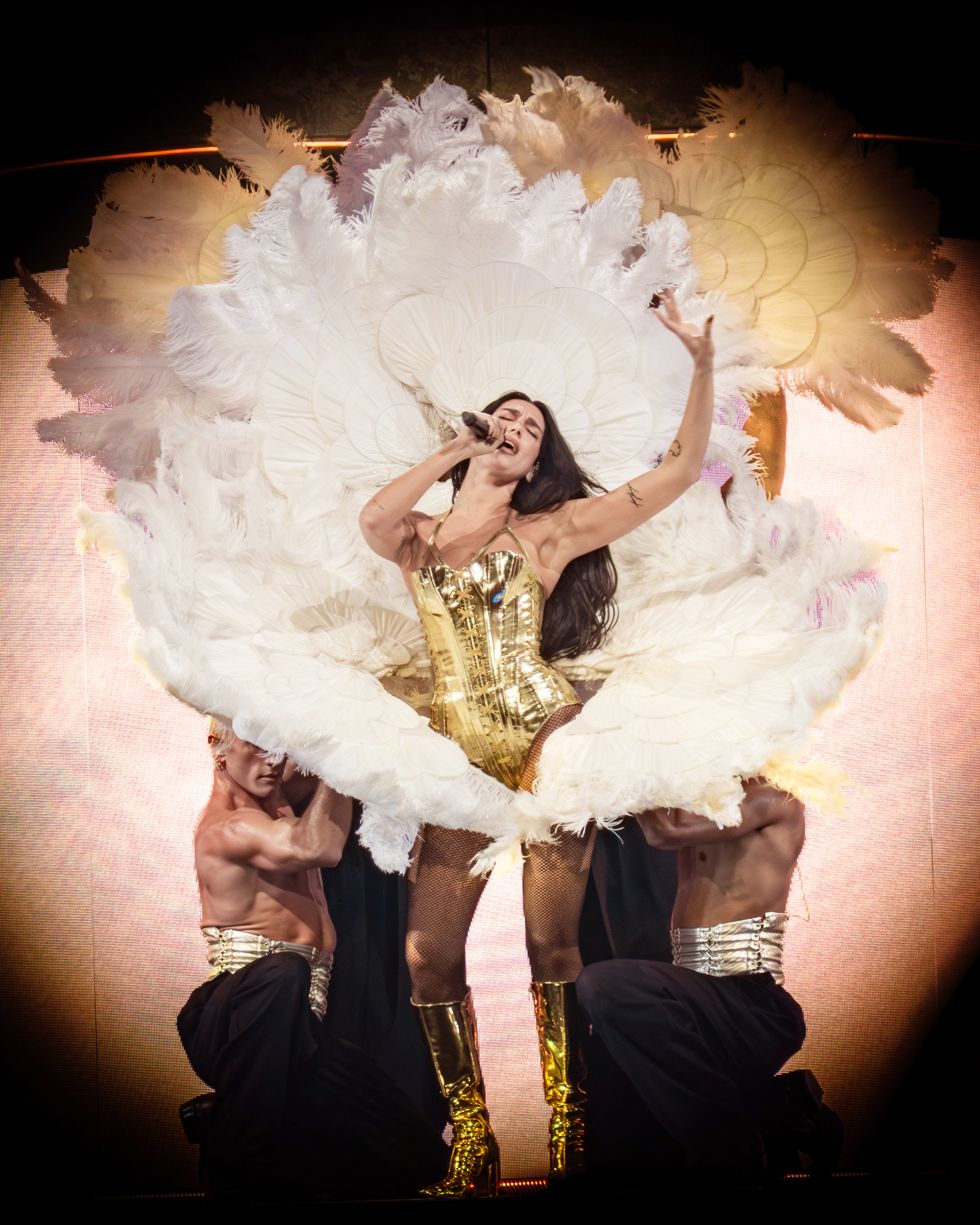
Lipa performing "End of an Era" in the middle of bowing feathered fans

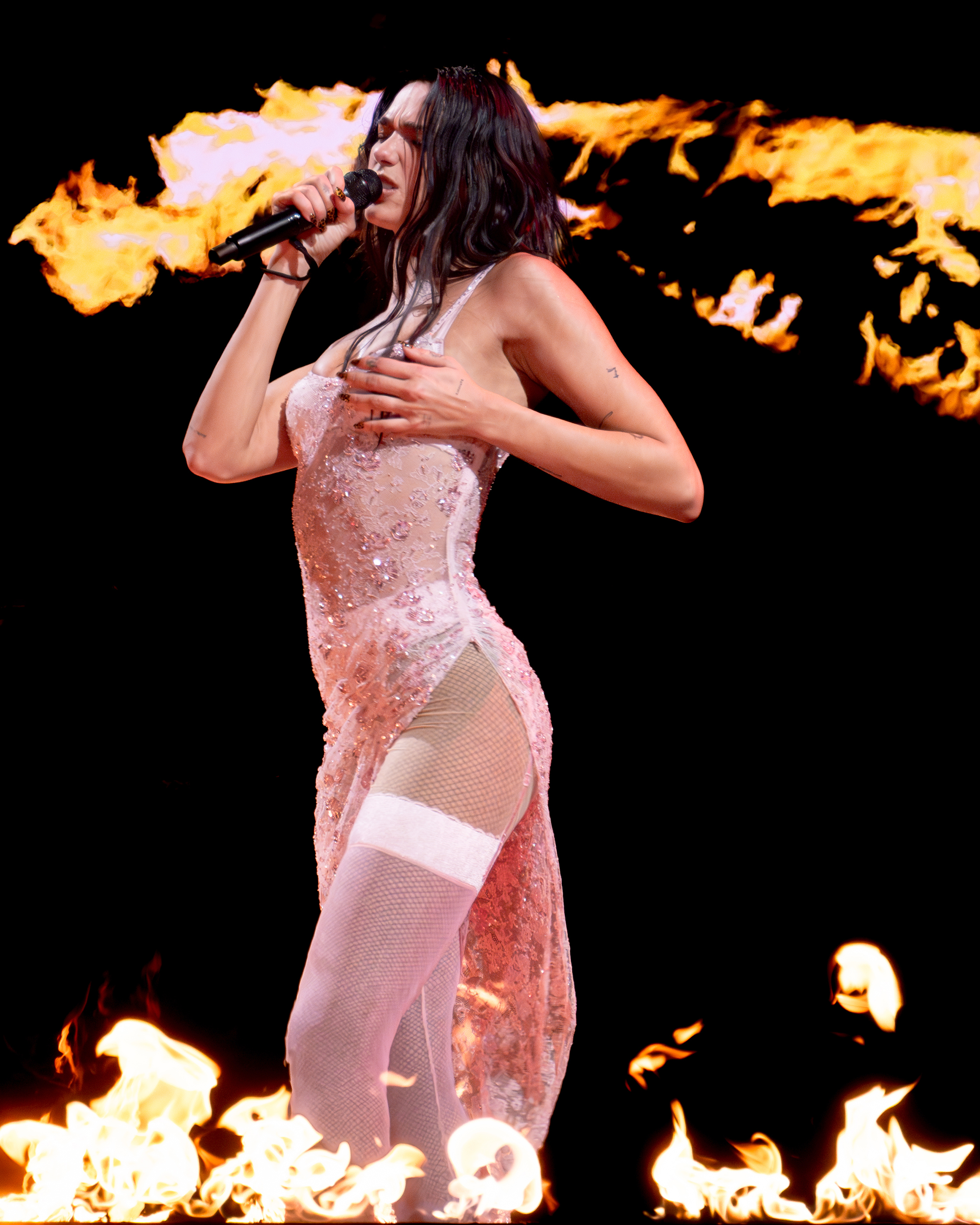
A ring of fire is lit up during a segment of the fourth act

The show for the 2025 dates lasts approximately two hours and is divided into four acts and an encore, with the displaying of an aquatic/"sea wave" atmosphere before the concert starts, playing a sound and visual introduction that depicts water, breaking waves, and a deep blue that creates the sensation of a "rolling tide". Lipa emerges in the centre amidst white smoke and performs "Training Season", kicking off the recital. She then performs "End of an Era" surrounded by her backup dancers manning burlesque-style feathers and a backdrop of pastel clouds. Next, "Break My Heart" is performed set against deep red lighting, as dancers lift Lipa into the air, followed by the closer of the first act of the show, the 2018 hit with Calvin Harris, "One Kiss".

The second act begins with Lipa in a new outfit performing a chair routine for "Whatcha Doing" and a "cosmic" version of "Levitating". After this, she walks through the crowd to greet fans and take selfies with them as she makes her way to the B-stage for "more" intimate songs. There, Lipa performs "These Walls", preceding a cover of a song by a local artist based on the city she is touring in and, on select dates, accompanied by a surprise guest. A "Mexican-indebted" visual performance of "Maria" closes the second act on the extended section of the stage in the middle of the venue. The opening of act three is handled by the performance of "Physical", where dancers use glowing LED batons in a "high energy" routine after a "Jazzercise-like" warm-up interlude during an offstage costume change. Lipa additionally commands the audience through the speakers to "shake those hips" and "swing around" like a workout instructor. "Electricity" follows as a house-inspired rave and hyped-up version, and a "churned out banger" rendition of "Hallucinate" is sung next after. Lipa closes the section with a "killer version"-described performance of "Illusion".

The element of fire is dubbed as the centrepiece of the fourth act. "Falling Forever" is performed as Lipa stands atop the C-stage, and two backup singers are brought out in the middle of the song. For "Happy for You", Lipa is located amid a "striking" tableau of clouds, which gives the illusion of a beautifully blossomed ambience. Following this, "Love Again" is performed with Lipa singing in a ring of fire while hoisted in the air on a platform and cloaked in a faux fur coat. To close the act, she performs "Anything for Love" still surrounded by the leaping flames and "Be the One" with a portion of the song a cappella, remarking on the track as her "personal favourite". She also goes back into the crowd, standing amongst the barricaded fans and directly interacting with them for a second occasion at the show. After a last interlude and outfit change, the encore begins with "New Rules", followed by the Barbie (2023) soundtrack single "Dance the Night" during a "glittering" performance. "Don't Start Now" precedes the closing number of the night, "Houdini", with Lipa disappearing behind a puff of smoke as the lights shut off.

== Critical reception ==
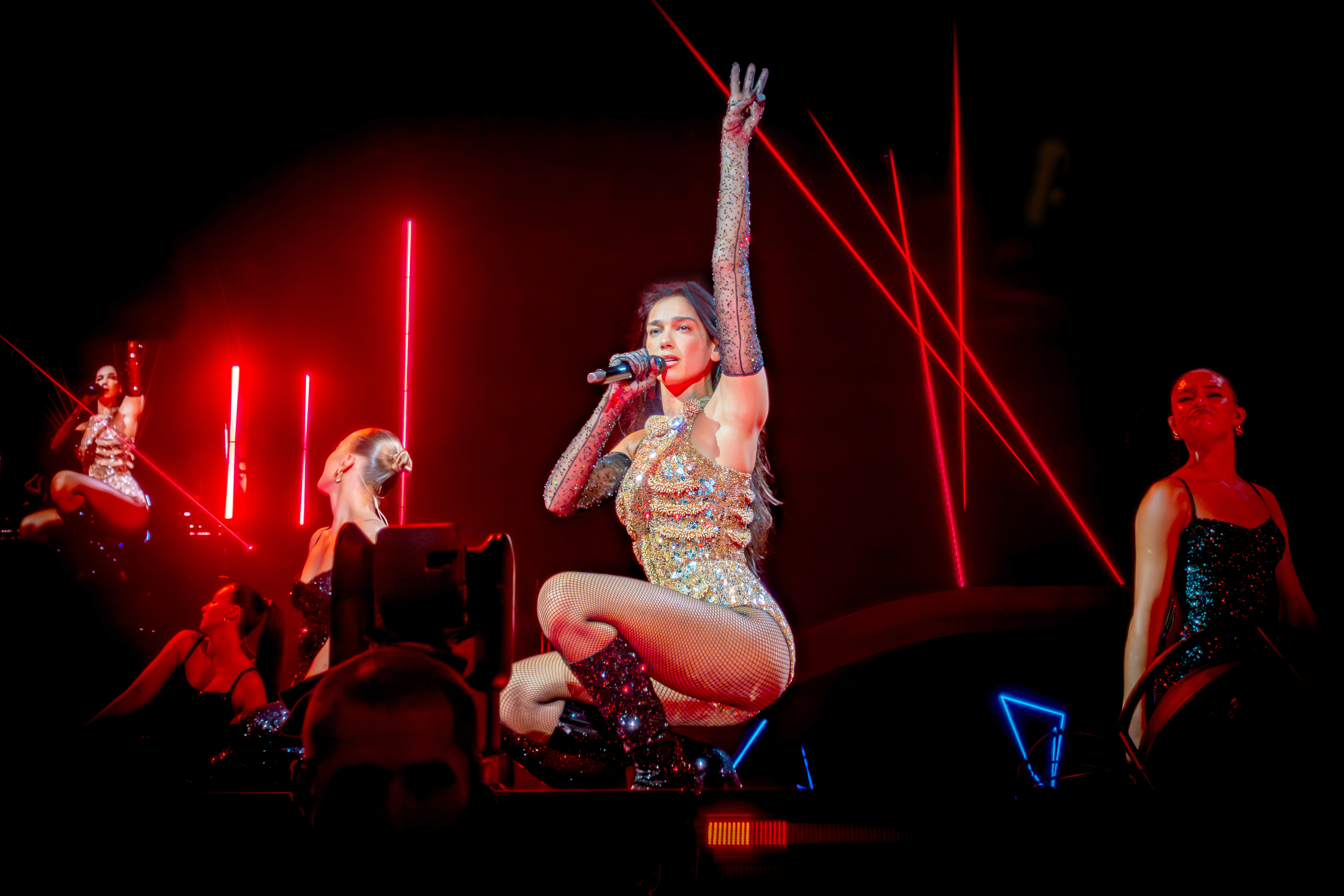
Lipa's performance skills were unanimously praised by critics

The Radical Optimism Tour received positive reviews from critics, who particularly praised the stage presence that Lipa brought to her audience. Following the opening night on 5 November 2024 in Singapore, Yamini Chinnuswamy of The Straits Times commended Lipa's performance skills, saying that "she never missed her beat, and her signature deep vocals never wavered". Billboard Philippines' Gabriel Saulog summed up the show as "bold, (surprisingly) emotional, and undeniably unforgettable", while emphasising Lipa's "powerhouse" vocal performance. Nikita Mahato from Mandatory claimed that Lipa offered a "rocking and sultry" performance and labelled the concert as an "enthralling experience". Korea JoongAng Daily's Woo Ji-won lauded Lipa for "dominating the stage with her breathtaking vocals complemented by the top-notch sounds of her live band" and regarded the first Seoul show as a "promised party" that faded away the tension of the then-occurring 2024 South Korean martial law crisis.

Ava Whitworth of Stuff highlighted the revamped production for the 2025 shows, dubbing it "insane" and "energy soaring" at the same time, and applauding the segments of Lipa interacting with the audience. In a five-star review, Ashley Davey of the British edition of Rolling Stone praised Lipa's stage presence, stating that "slick choreography and sustained vocals" worked together to cement her as "a star in her own league", while The London Standard's Vicky Jessop declared that the concert stood out as a "victory lap for the megalithic pop star". In the Chicago Sun-Times, Selena Fragassi remarked on the "high-calibre" production alongside Lipa's "power of her feminine mystique continuing to captivate for the next two hours." Similarly, Nicholas Hautman of Us Weekly reported that the concert "[brought] the glitz and glamour" of Manhattan's legendary discotheque Studio 54, while commending Lipa's stage performance as "a crowd captivator". The Harvard Crimson's Hannah M. Wilkoff acclaimed Lipa for standing apart "as a singer, a performer, and a master of crowd dynamics".

Writing for Deadline Hollywood, Anthony D'Alessandro complimented the show, calling it a "homage to 70s disco and 80s sonic auras", although concluding that he felt the overall encore was "too rushed". Joanne dePierre from The Stanford Daily exalted Lipa's live skills by asserting that the singer "reminded everyone exactly why she's one of pop's defining stars", albeit referring to the pauses of short breaks for outfit changes and staging resets as too "stretched". In a more lukewarm review, Stephen Dalton of The Times considered that Lipa, despite delivering a "high-energy performance", remained "in generic dance-pop mode for most of the evening." Likewise, Exclaim!'s Abhiraj Lamba wrote that Lipa "proved beyond doubt that she knows how to make a crowd dance to her beat", adding that "sometimes even being a fantastic performer is not enough to carry a show."

== Commercial performance ==
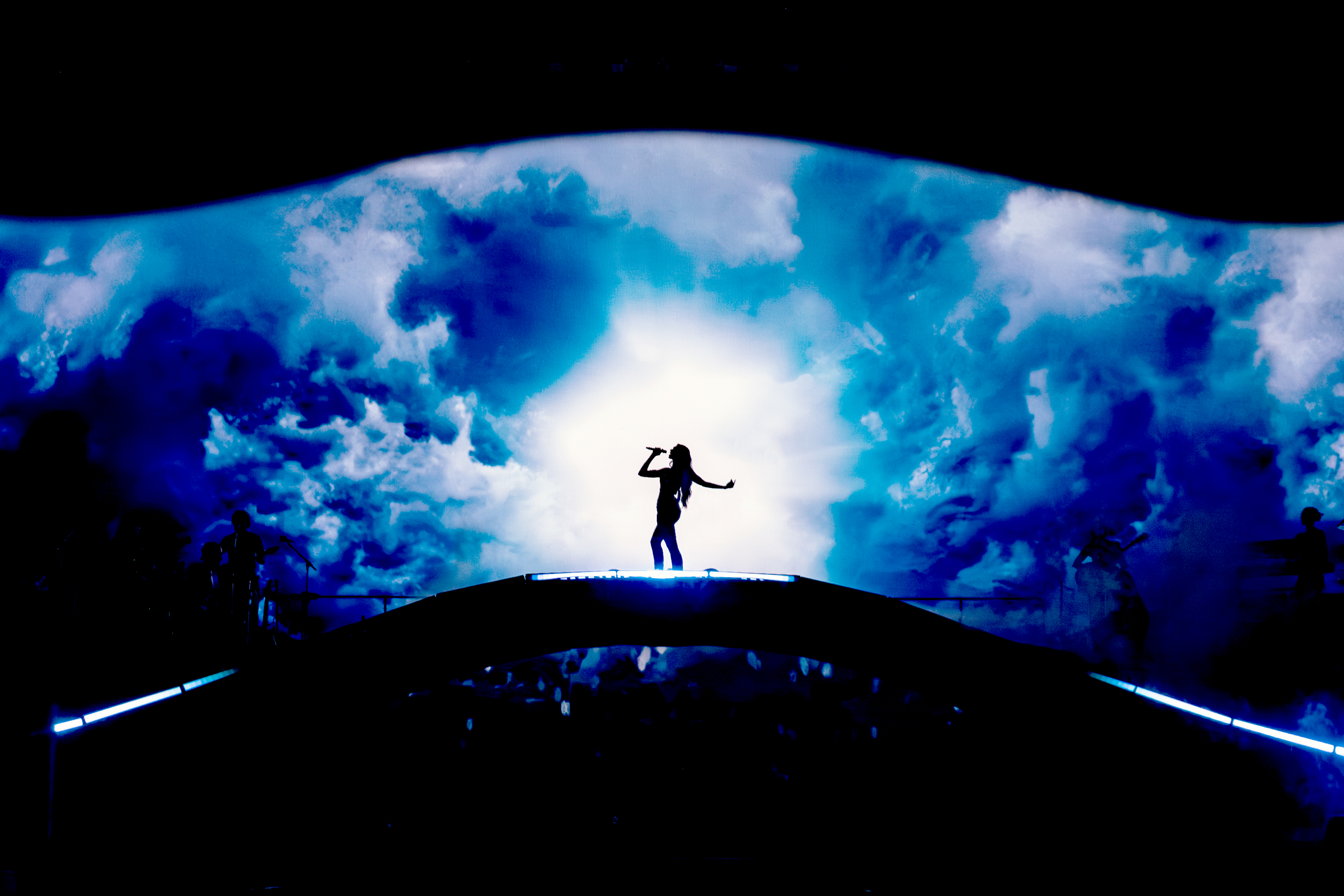
Lipa performing "Training Season" at the Kia Forum; high demand for the tour made her extend to four shows in the venue.

According to figures reported by Billboard Boxscore, the Radical Optimism Tour grossed $112.3 million and sold 960,000 tickets over its first 44 shows after wrapping the European leg on 27 June 2025 at Dublin's Aviva Stadium, resulting in Lipa's highest-grossing tour to date. The eleven prior shows held in Asia from November to December 2024 grossed $21 million and sold 166,000 tickets, while the Oceania leg, carried out between 17 March and 4 April 2025, grossed $17.2 million from 139,000 tickets over ten shows. The 23 European shows grossed $74.1 million and sold 656,000 tickets, including 86,000 purchased tickets which eventually grossed $9 million during a double-date residency at Paris La Défense Arena and two nights at Wembley Stadium that sold 151,000 tickets, ultimately grossing $19.1 million. The tour ranked as the third highest-grossing of pop music and the eighteenth overall of 2025 by earning $141.1 million and having sold 1.2 million in ticket sales across 59 shows.

In Pollstar, Lipa appeared on the Artist Power Index (APX) chart after her two-night kick-off engagement on 5 and 6 November 2024 at Singapore Indoor Stadium, based on ticket sales, streaming, airplay and social performance. The publication furthermore reported that the three shows held during late March 2025 at Sydney's Qudos Bank Arena sold 48,000 tickets and surpassed the grossing figure of $5 million. Following the North American leg, Lipa re-entered at number six on the APX ranking after scoring the fifth-best Live rank among all the performers on the 50-position chart, while additionally tallying the highest Live score among the six women in the top 10 during the week of 20 October 2025. In a Top 20 Global Concert Tours list, she ranked number ten with an average box office gross of $1.9 million, based on an estimated attendance of 12,988 per city and an approximated general ticket price of $144.

== Accolades ==
Melissa Ruggieri of USA Today ranked Lipa's Radical Optimism Tour dates in Chicago as the tenth best concert series of 2025. Variety selected the 8 October 2025 concert in Inglewood as one of the year's most memorable, whereas Lauren McCarthy of Nylon highlighted the encore of the show as the best from all tours held during 2025.

Accolades
Year	Organization	Category	Result	Ref.
2026	The Arthur Awards	The Top Tour Award	Nominated	
2026	iHeartRadio Music Awards	Favorite Tour Style	Nominated	
2026	iHeartRadio Music Awards	Favorite Tour Tradition	Nominated	

== Broadcasts ==
On 14 May 2026, Lipa announced on social media the release of a live album and concert film titled Live from Mexico, which premiered on her YouTube channel on 21 May. The broadcasts were recorded across the three shows held at Estadio GNP Seguros in Mexico City, with the concert film being under the direction of Paul Dugdale. In the film's trailer, Lipa addresses the crowd in an emotional moment: "This tour has been the most beautiful and fulfilling experience of my career so far", and stating that "[the fans] have built something bigger than a show. You've built a family and I feel that every single night." While announcing the news through her social media accounts, she also shared a link to the release of the album track "End of an Era (Live from Mexico)". The live album was released to music streaming services on 22 May, followed by physical formats on 5 June.

The day of the online debut, a premiere screening for select fans in Mexico City was also held. The event included karaoke activities, selfie photo boots, and an immersive dancefloor, in addition to a special message sent by Lipa. A YouTube after-party was available to the platform's premium users. The album entered at number 21 on the UK Albums Chart, and peaked at number 14 on its second week.

== Set list ==
=== 2024 ===
This set list is from the 5 November 2024 concert in Singapore.

1. "Training Season"
2. "One Kiss"
3. "Illusion"
4. "End of an Era"
5. "Break My Heart"
6. "Whatcha Doing"
7. "Levitating"
8. "These Walls"
9. "Be the One"
10. "Love Again"
11. "Pretty Please"
12. "Hallucinate"
13. "New Rules"
14. "Electricity"
15. "Cold Heart"
16. "Anything for Love"
17. "Happy for You"

Encore

18. "Physical"
19. "Dance the Night"
20. "Don't Start Now"
21. "Houdini"

=== 2025 ===
This set list is from the 17 March 2025 concert in Melbourne. It does not represent all concerts for the tour.

Act I

1. "Training Season"
2. "End of an Era"
3. "Break My Heart"
4. "One Kiss"

Act II

5. "Whatcha Doing"
6. "Levitating"
7. "These Walls"
8. Cover song
9. "Maria"

Act III

10. "Physical"
11. "Electricity"
12. "Hallucinate"
13. "Illusion"

Act IV

14. "Falling Forever"
15. "Happy for You"
16. "Love Again"
17. "Anything for Love"
18. "Be the One"

Encore

19. "New Rules"
20. "Dance the Night"
21. "Don't Start Now"
22. "Houdini"

=== Alterations and notes ===
- During the 4 June 2025 concert in Amsterdam, in lieu of a cover song, "Scared to Be Lonely" was performed.
- During the 12 June 2025 concert in Antwerp, "These Walls" was performed with Pierre de Maere.
- During the 13 June 2025 concert in Antwerp, in lieu of a cover song, "Fever" was performed with Angèle.
- During the 20 June 2025 concert in London, "Hotter than Hell" was performed after "These Walls".
- During the 21 June 2025 concert in London, "IDGAF" was performed.
- During the 1 October 2025 concert in Dallas, "Physical" was performed with the Dallas Cowboys Cheerleaders.

=== Cover songs ===
Beginning in March 2025, Lipa performed a cover of a song by a local artist based on the city she was performing in.

- 17 March 2025 – Melbourne: "Highway to Hell" by AC/DC
- 19 March 2025 – Melbourne: "Torn" by Natalie Imbruglia
- 20 March 2025 – Melbourne: "Can't Get You Out of My Head" by Kylie Minogue
- 22 March 2025 – Melbourne: "Rush" by Troye Sivan (with Sivan)
- 23 March 2025 – Melbourne: "Riptide" by Vance Joy (with Vance Joy)
- 26 March 2025 – Sydney: "Never Tear Us Apart" by INXS
- 28 March 2025 – Sydney: "The Less I Know the Better" by Tame Impala (with Kevin Parker)
- 29 March 2025 – Sydney: "Big Jet Plane" by Angus & Julia Stone (with Angus Stone)
- 2 April 2025 – Auckland: "Royals" by Lorde
- 4 April 2025 – Auckland: "Don't Dream It's Over" by Crowded House (with Neil Finn)
- 11 May 2025 – Madrid: "Héroe" by Enrique Iglesias
- 12 May 2025 – Madrid: "Me Gustas Tú" by Manu Chao
- 15 May 2025 – Décines-Charpieu (Note: Labelled as Lyon in promotional material.): "Dernière danse" by Indila
- 16 May 2025 – Décines-Charpieu: "Get Lucky" by Daft Punk
- 19 May 2025 – Hamburg: "99 Luftballons" by Nena
- 20 May 2025 – Hamburg: "Wind of Change" by Scorpions
- 23 May 2025 – Nanterre (Note: Labelled as Paris in promotional material.): "Moi... Lolita" by Alizée
- 24 May 2025 – Nanterre: "Be My Baby" by Vanessa Paradis
- 27 May 2025 – Prague: "Na ostří nože" by Ewa Farna
- 28 May 2025 – Prague: "Na ostří nože" by Farna (with Farna)
- 31 May 2025 – Munich: "Forever Young" by Alphaville
- 1 June 2025 – Munich: "Stolen Dance" by Milky Chance
- 3 June 2025 – Amsterdam: "Bloed, zweet en tranen" by André Hazes
- 7 June 2025 – Milan: "A far l'amore comincia tu" by Raffaella Carrà
- 11 June 2025 – Antwerp: "Sensualité" by Axelle Red
- 12 June 2025 – Antwerp: "Un jour je marierai un ange" by de Maere (with de Maere)
- 20 June 2025 – London: "Virtual Insanity" by Jamiroquai (with Jay Kay)
- 21 June 2025 – London: "360" by Charli XCX (with Charli XCX)
- 24 June 2025 – Liverpool: "Valerie" by the Zutons (with Dave McCabe)
- 25 June 2025 – Liverpool: "Hey Jude" by the Beatles
- 27 June 2025 – Dublin: "Nothing Compares 2 U" by Sinéad O'Connor
- 1 August 2025 – Pristina: "Era" by Gjurmët (with Dukagjin Lipa)
- 1 September 2025 – Toronto: "I'm Like a Bird" by Nelly Furtado
- 2 September 2025 – Toronto: "Name of God" by Mustafa the Poet (with Mustafa the Poet)
- 5 September 2025 – Chicago: "Ain't Nobody" by Rufus and Chaka Khan (with Khan)
- 6 September 2025 – Chicago: "September" by Earth, Wind & Fire
- 9 September 2025 – Boston: "I Don't Want to Miss a Thing" by Aerosmith
- 10 September 2025 – Boston: "Bad Girls" by Donna Summer
- 13 September 2025 – Atlanta: "Hey Ya!" by Outkast
- 14 September 2025 – Atlanta: "No Scrubs" by TLC
- 17 September 2025 – New York City: "No One" by Alicia Keys
- 18 September 2025 – New York City: "One Way or Another" by Blondie
- 20 September 2025 – New York City: "Le Freak" by Chic (with Nile Rodgers)
- 21 September 2025 – New York City: "It Ain't Over 'til It's Over" by Lenny Kravitz (with Kravitz)
- 26 September 2025 – Miami: "Conga" by Miami Sound Machine
- 27 September 2025 – Miami: "One Last Time" by Ariana Grande
- 30 September 2025 – Dallas: "Since U Been Gone" by Kelly Clarkson
- 1 October 2025 – Dallas: "Beyond" by Leon Bridges (with Bridges)
- 4 October 2025 – Inglewood (Note: Labelled as Los Angeles in promotion material.): "The Chain" by Fleetwood Mac
- 5 October 2025 – Inglewood: "California Dreamin'" by the Mamas & the Papas
- 7 October 2025 – Inglewood: "All Night Long (All Night)" by Lionel Richie (with Richie)
- 8 October 2025 – Inglewood: "Don't Speak" by No Doubt (with Gwen Stefani)
- 11 October 2025 – San Francisco: "Piece of My Heart" by Big Brother and the Holding Company
- 12 October 2025 – San Francisco: "Wake Me Up When September Ends" by Green Day (with Billie Joe Armstrong)
- 15 October 2025 – Seattle: "The Story" by Brandi Carlile (with Carlile)
- 16 October 2025 – Seattle: "I Will Follow You into the Dark" by Death Cab for Cutie (with Ben Gibbard)
- 7 November 2025 – Buenos Aires: "De Música Ligera" by Soda Stereo
- 8 November 2025 – Buenos Aires: "Tu Misterioso Alguien" by Miranda!
- 11 November 2025 – Santiago: "Tu falta de querer" by Mon Laferte
- 12 November 2025 – Santiago: "El Duelo" by La Ley
- 15 November 2025 – São Paulo: "Magalenha" by Carlinhos Brown (with Brown) and "Margarida Perfumada" by Timbalada (with Brown and Caetano Veloso)
- 22 November 2025 – Rio de Janeiro: "Mas que nada" by Jorge Ben
- 25 November 2025 – Lima: "Cariñito" by Los Hijos del Sol (with Mauricio Mesones)
- 28 November 2025 – Bogotá: "Antología" by Shakira
- 1 December 2025 – Mexico City: "Bésame Mucho" by Consuelo Velázquez
- 2 December 2025 – Mexico City: "Oye Mi Amor" by Maná (with Fher Olvera)
- 5 December 2025 – Mexico City: "Amor Prohibido" by Selena

== Tour dates ==
List of 2024 concerts
Date (2024)	City	Country	Venue	Supporting acts	Attendance	Revenue
5 November	Singapore		Singapore Indoor Stadium	—N/a	18,849 / 18,849	$3,058,093
6 November	Singapore		Singapore Indoor Stadium	—N/a	18,849 / 18,849	$3,058,093
13 November	Bocaue (Note: Labelled as Manila in promotional material.)	Philippines	Philippine Arena	—N/a	24,986 / 24,986	$2,434,968
16 November	Saitama (Note: Labelled as Tokyo in promotional material.)	Japan	Saitama Super Arena	—N/a	38,310 / 38,310	$4,967,068
17 November	Saitama	Japan	Saitama Super Arena	—N/a	38,310 / 38,310	$4,967,068
20 November	Taoyuan (Note: Labelled as Taipei in promotional material.)	Taiwan	Rakuten Taoyuan Baseball Stadium	—N/a	20,834 / 20,834	$3,097,124
23 November	Kuala Lumpur	Malaysia	Axiata Arena	—N/a	19,173 / 19,173	$2,797,362
24 November	Kuala Lumpur	Malaysia	Axiata Arena	—N/a	19,173 / 19,173	$2,797,362
27 November	Pak Kret (Note: Labelled as Bangkok in promotional material.)	Thailand	Impact Arena	—N/a	13,592 / 13,592	$1,546,086
30 November (Note: This concert was a part of Zomato Feeding India Concert.)	Mumbai	India	MMRDA Grounds	—N/a	—N/a	
4 December	Seoul	South Korea	Gocheok Sky Dome	—N/a	30,209 / 30,209	$3,103,169
5 December	Seoul	South Korea	Gocheok Sky Dome	—N/a	30,209 / 30,209	$3,103,169

List of 2025 concerts
Date (2025)	City	Country	Venue	Supporting acts	Attendance	Revenue
17 March	Melbourne	Australia	Rod Laver Arena	Kita Alexander	66,388 / 66,388	$7,419,856
19 March	Melbourne	Australia	Rod Laver Arena	Kita Alexander	66,388 / 66,388	$7,419,856
20 March	Melbourne	Australia	Rod Laver Arena	Kita Alexander	66,388 / 66,388	$7,419,856
22 March	Melbourne	Australia	Rod Laver Arena	Kita Alexander	66,388 / 66,388	$7,419,856
23 March	Melbourne	Australia	Rod Laver Arena	Kita Alexander	66,388 / 66,388	$7,419,856
26 March	Sydney	Australia	Qudos Bank Arena	Kita Alexander	48,495 / 48,495	$7,493,635
28 March	Sydney	Australia	Qudos Bank Arena	Kita Alexander	48,495 / 48,495	$7,493,635
29 March	Sydney	Australia	Qudos Bank Arena	Kita Alexander	48,495 / 48,495	$7,493,635
2 April	Auckland	New Zealand	Spark Arena	Kita Alexander	24,281 / 24,281	$2,329,427
4 April	Auckland	New Zealand	Spark Arena	Kita Alexander	24,281 / 24,281	$2,329,427
11 May	Madrid	Spain	Movistar Arena	Alessi Rose	205,000 (Note: For all 11 shows in May 2025. The two shows in Paris drew a crowd of 86,000.)	$21,800,000 (Note: For all 11 shows in May 2025. The two shows in Paris got the revenue of $9,000,000.)
12 May	Madrid	Spain	Movistar Arena	Alessi Rose	205,000	$21,800,000
15 May	Décines-Charpieu	France	LDLC Arena	Alessi Rose	205,000	$21,800,000
16 May	Décines-Charpieu	France	LDLC Arena	Alessi Rose	205,000	$21,800,000
19 May	Hamburg	Germany	Barclays Arena	Alessi Rose	205,000	$21,800,000
20 May	Hamburg	Germany	Barclays Arena	Alessi Rose	205,000	$21,800,000
23 May	Nanterre	France	Paris La Défense Arena	Alessi Rose	205,000	$21,800,000
24 May	Nanterre	France	Paris La Défense Arena	Alessi Rose	205,000	$21,800,000
27 May	Prague	Czech Republic	O_{2} Arena	Alessi Rose	205,000	$21,800,000
28 May	Prague	Czech Republic	O_{2} Arena	Alessi Rose	205,000	$21,800,000
31 May	Munich	Germany	Olympiahalle	Alessi Rose	205,000	$21,800,000
1 June	Munich	Germany	Olympiahalle	Alessi Rose	451,000 (Note: For all 12 shows in June 2025. The two shows in London drew a crowd of 151,000.)	$52,300,000 (Note: For all 12 shows in June 2025. The two shows in London got the revenue of $19,100,000.)
3 June	Amsterdam	Netherlands	Ziggo Dome	Alessi Rose	451,000	$52,300,000
4 June	Amsterdam	Netherlands	Ziggo Dome	Alessi Rose	451,000	$52,300,000
7 June (Note: This concert was a part of I-Days Milano.)	Milan	Italy	Ippodromo Snai La Maura	Merk & Kremont; Alessi Rose	451,000	$52,300,000
11 June	Antwerp	Belgium	Sportpaleis	Alessi Rose	451,000	$52,300,000
12 June	Antwerp	Belgium	Sportpaleis	Alessi Rose	451,000	$52,300,000
13 June	Antwerp	Belgium	Sportpaleis	Alessi Rose	451,000	$52,300,000
20 June	London	England	Wembley Stadium	Dove Cameron; Alessi Rose	451,000	$52,300,000
21 June	London	England	Wembley Stadium	Dove Cameron; Alessi Rose	451,000	$52,300,000
24 June	Liverpool	England	Anfield	Dove Cameron; Alessi Rose	451,000	$52,300,000
25 June	Liverpool	England	Anfield	Dove Cameron; Alessi Rose	451,000	$52,300,000
27 June	Dublin	Ireland	Aviva Stadium	Dove Cameron; Alessi Rose	451,000	$52,300,000
1 August (Note: This concert was a part of Sunny Hill Festival.)	Pristina	Kosovo	Sunny Hill Festival Park	—N/a		
1 September	Toronto	Canada	Scotiabank Arena	Cil	194,000 (Note: For all 15 shows in September 2025. The four shows in New York City drew a crowd of 55,100.)	$28,700,000 (Note: For all 15 shows in September 2025. The four shows in New York City got the revenue of $8,500,000.)
2 September	Toronto	Canada	Scotiabank Arena	Cil	194,000	$28,700,000
5 September	Chicago	United States	United Center	Cil	194,000	$28,700,000
6 September	Chicago	United States	United Center	Cil	194,000	$28,700,000
9 September	Boston	United States	TD Garden	Cil	194,000	$28,700,000
10 September	Boston	United States	TD Garden	Cil	194,000	$28,700,000
13 September	Atlanta	United States	State Farm Arena	Cil	194,000	$28,700,000
14 September	Atlanta	United States	State Farm Arena	Cil	194,000	$28,700,000
17 September	New York City	United States	Madison Square Garden	Cil	194,000	$28,700,000
18 September	New York City	United States	Madison Square Garden	Cil	194,000	$28,700,000
20 September	New York City	United States	Madison Square Garden	Cil	194,000	$28,700,000
21 September	New York City	United States	Madison Square Garden	Cil	194,000	$28,700,000
26 September	Miami	United States	Kaseya Center	Cil	194,000	$28,700,000
27 September	Miami	United States	Kaseya Center	Cil	194,000	$28,700,000
30 September	Dallas	United States	American Airlines Center	Cil	194,000	$28,700,000
1 October	Dallas	United States	American Airlines Center	Cil	118,000 (Note: For all 9 shows in October 2025. The four shows in Los Angeles drew a crowd of 51,900.)	$17,500,000 (Note: For all 9 shows in October 2025. The four shows in Los Angeles got the revenue of $7,600,000.)
4 October	Inglewood	United States	Kia Forum	Cil	118,000	$17,500,000
5 October	Inglewood	United States	Kia Forum	Cil	118,000	$17,500,000
7 October	Inglewood	United States	Kia Forum	Cil	118,000	$17,500,000
8 October	Inglewood	United States	Kia Forum	Cil	118,000	$17,500,000
11 October	San Francisco	United States	Chase Center	Cil	118,000	$17,500,000
12 October	San Francisco	United States	Chase Center	Cil	118,000	$17,500,000
15 October	Seattle	United States	Climate Pledge Arena	Cil	118,000	$17,500,000
16 October	Seattle	United States	Climate Pledge Arena	Cil	118,000	$17,500,000
7 November	Buenos Aires	Argentina	Estadio Mâs Monumental	Yami Safdie	118,000	$10,500,000
8 November	Buenos Aires	Argentina	Estadio Mâs Monumental	Yami Safdie	118,000	$10,500,000
11 November	Santiago	Chile	Estadio Nacional Julio Martínez Prádanos	Princesa Alba	109,000	$9,900,000
12 November	Santiago	Chile	Estadio Nacional Julio Martínez Prádanos	Princesa Alba	109,000	$9,900,000
15 November	São Paulo	Brazil	MorumBIS	—N/a	173,000	$16,700,000
22 November	Rio de Janeiro	Brazil	Farmasi Arena (Note: The 22 November 2025 concert was originally scheduled to take place at Estádio Olímpico Nilton Santos, but was relocated to the outdoor area of Farmasi Arena due to the scheduling conflict with a match of the venue's local team, Botafogo FR.)	—N/a	173,000	$16,700,000
25 November	Lima	Peru	Estadio Universidad San Marcos	—N/a	173,000	$16,700,000
28 November	Bogotá	Colombia	Estadio El Campín	—N/a	173,000	$16,700,000
1 December	Mexico City	Mexico	Estadio GNP Seguros	—N/a	192,000	$18,700,000
2 December	Mexico City	Mexico	Estadio GNP Seguros	—N/a	192,000	$18,700,000
5 December	Mexico City	Mexico	Estadio GNP Seguros	Bu Cuarón	192,000	$18,700,000
Total					1,865,000	$214,300,000

=== Cancelled show ===
List of cancelled concert
Date (2024)	City	Country	Venue	Reason	Ref.
9 November	Jakarta	Indonesia	Indonesia Arena	Stage safety concerns	

== Personnel ==
Credits adapted from Notch, Deadline Hollywood, and Variety.

=== Band ===
- Dua Lipa – vocals
- Matthew Carroll – bandleader, bass
- Sophie Galpin – guitar, backing vocals
- Alex Lanyon – guitar, backing vocals
- Ciara O'Connor – backing vocals
- Naomi Scarlett – backing vocals
- Adam Wade – drums
- Georgie Ward – keyboards

=== Show and tour staff ===
- Peter Abott – tour director
- David Black – tour creative director
- Charm La'Donna – choreographer
- Matt Pitman – production and lighting designer
- William Bowerman – musical director
- Jason Ardizzone-West – production and set designer
- Lorenzo Posocco – stylist
- Katie Jane Hughes – makeup artist
- Peter Lux – hair stylist
- Robin Senoner – video director and programmer
- Charlotte Wilde – video content producer
- Charli Davis – video content designer
- Paddy Lieshman – editor
- Rob Hales – animator
- Barbora Gillute – animator
- James Hartford – animator
- Ian Macintosh – animator
- Chris Homer – animator
- Kooch Chung – animator
- Mark Todd – animator
- Andy Coates – modeller
- Justin Diamond – modeller
- Aaron Veness – lighting director
- Olly Martin – lighting programmer and associate LD
- Oliver Hynds – design assistant
- Sammi Lee Jayne – dance captain and assistant choreographer
- Sharon June – associate choreographer
- Ross Marshall – Notch designer
- Tom Snell – associate designer
- Isaac Fisher – assistant producer
- Elizabeth Miranda – photographer
- Jordan Munns – photographer
- Mitch Lowe – photographer
- Ashlea Caygill – photographer
- Dugi Lipa – manager
- Sofia Gold – manager
