= Rosado (surname) =

The surname Rosado may refer to:

- Ángel Aníbal Rosado (1942–2008), Peruvian composer
- Arnaldo Darío Rosado (1953–1978), activist for the independence of Puerto Rico
- Carlos Rosado (born 1975), retired Mexican American football player
- Carmen García Rosado (1926–2016), educator, author and activist for the rights of women veterans
- David Rosado (born 1942), New York politician
- Diogo Rosado (born 1990), Portuguese football player
- Gabriel Rosado (born 1986), Puerto Rican-American boxer
- José Rosado (born 1974), former Major League Baseball player
- Juan Manuel Rosado (born 1974), retired Spanish football player
- Julio Rosado del Valle (1922–2008), internationally known abstract expressionist
- Luis Rosado (born 1955), retired Puerto-Rican Major League Baseball player
- Yordi Rosado (born 1971), Mexican television host and author

== See also ==
- Rosado (disambiguation)
