= Paris, Texas (disambiguation) =

Paris, Texas is a city in the northeast portion of the U.S. state of Texas.

Paris, Texas or Paris Texas may also refer to:

- Paris, Texas (film), a 1984 film directed by Wim Wenders
  - Paris, Texas, a soundtrack by Ry Cooder
- Paris, Texas (band), a punk rock band from the U.S. state of Wisconsin
- Paris Texas (hip hop group), an alternative hip hop duo from Compton, California
- "Paris, Texas", a song by Lana Del Rey from the album Did You Know That There's a Tunnel Under Ocean Blvd
- Paris Texas (brand), Italian shoe brand

== See also ==
- Parris, Texas
- Paris (disambiguation)
