= Rosado =

Rosado is the Spanish word for the color pink.

Rosado may also refer to:

- Rosado (wine), a type of wine in Spanish-speaking countries
- Rosado (surname), people with the surname
- Governador Dix-Sept Rosado, a municipality in the state of Rio Grande do Norte in the Northeast region of Brazil
