= Nadia Lee Cohen =

British artist, photographer, and filmmaker (born 1992)

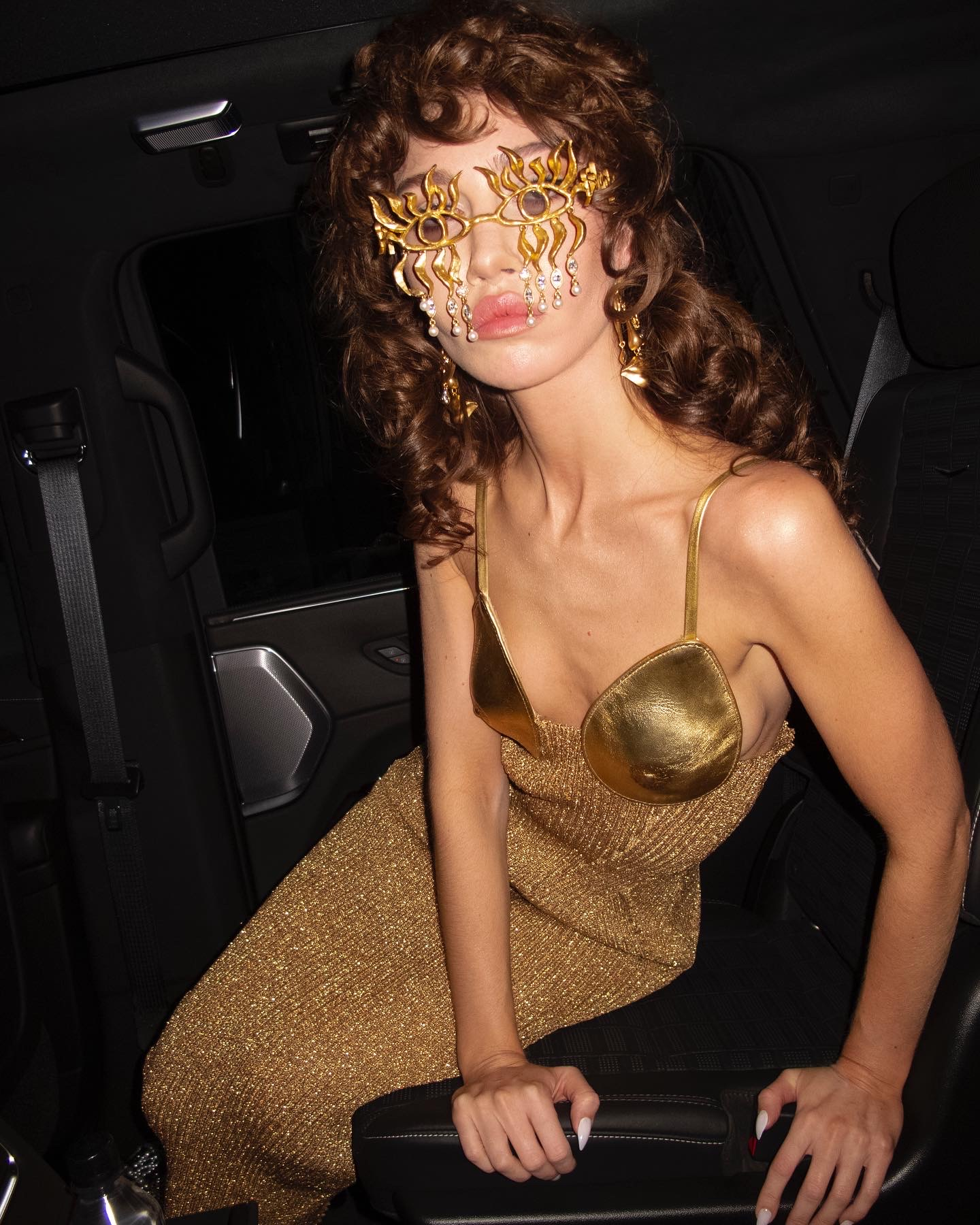
- Born: 15 November 1992 (age 34); Essex, England
- Education: London College of Fashion
- Occupations: Art photographer; filmmaker; model
- Website: www.nadialeecohen.com

Nadia Lee Cohen (born 15 November 1992) is a British artist, photographer, filmmaker, and model.

== Early life ==
Cohen was born in Essex in 1992, to an Israeli father of Moroccan Jewish descent, and a British mother of Ukrainian descent. She was raised on an isolated farm in the English countryside.

== Career ==
=== Early work ===
Lee Cohen's parents helped her build sets in their garage for her earliest film and photographic projects while she attended the London College of Fashion, where she graduated with BA (Hons) in fashion styling and photography and MA in fashion photography. She relocated to Los Angeles in search of the Hollywood scenery that inspired her, only to find the real Hollywood Boulevard was one of trashy stores and broken dreams. This became her new source of inspiration for her project, Women, that would be published six years later. Her photographs and films are character-driven visions of saturated and surreal dreamscapes that capture the manifest pleasures and visceral terrors of the urban environment.

=== Photography and literary work ===
In 2020, Lee Cohen published her first book, Women, with IDEA; a major monograph six years in the making; the book featured 100 previously unseen portraits.

As a film director, Lee Cohen has worked with Tyler, the Creator, Kali Uchis, A$AP Rocky and Katy Perry, among others. Commercially, she has worked in fashion with campaigns for Balenciaga, Mac, Maison Margiela, Adidas, Schiaparelli, Gucci, Miu Miu, and Valentino. As a photographer, Nadia has shot iconic women including Rihanna, Billie Jean King, Pamela Anderson, Kim Kardashian, and Sophia Loren.

Lee Cohen's second book, Hello My Name Is, was published by IDEA in December 2021. It saw Lee Cohen physically manifest herself into 33 characters (both female and male) imagined from 33 found name badges. Alongside each portrait is a still-life of found objects associated with each persona.

In 2021, Lee Cohen hosted the opening of The Academy Museum of Motion Pictures in Los Angeles, a night in collaboration with Vanity Fair, where she wore Daniel Roseberry’s iconic gold Schiaparelli design.

In May 2022, Lee Cohen opened her first solo art exhibition in the United States at Jeffrey Deitch gallery in Los Angeles. The gallery presented a thematic showcase of Cohen's photographic works from her monographs (Women and HELLO, My Name Is), in addition to an immersive installation featuring video works and life-like sculptures.

In 2024, Italian shoe brand Paris Texas partnered with Cohen on the design of two shoes.

=== Modeling and acting ===
In 2019, Lee Cohen was cast as Danny Trejo’s girlfriend in the movie Black Licorice. In 2021, she was selected by Couture House of Schiaparelli to be the face of their new campaign, with Vogue magazine dubbing Nadia ‘The Schiaparelli muse we’re all obsessed with’.

Lee Cohen was previously featured as a model for Maison Margiela, appeared in Calvin Klein's campaign, and walked for Rihanna's Savage X Fenty Show. In 2021, she was the cover of C41 magazine, Rollacoaster Magazine and Numéro.

== Personal life ==
Since 2026, Cohen has been in a relationship with Mark Eydelshteyn, whom she met during a Balenciaga shoot in 2025.

== Filmography ==
=== 2018 ===
- Kali Uchis feat. Tyler, the Creator & Bootsy Collins – After the Storm
- GCDS feat. Pamela Anderson – Sgualdrina
- Katy Perry – Cozy Little Christmas

=== 2019 ===
- Adult Swim – Future Beach
- Mac DeMarco & The Garden – Thy Mission
- A$AP Rocky – Babushka Boi
- Maison Margiela – My Mutiny
- Playboy – Once a playmate, always a playmate

=== 2025 ===
- Aphex Twin – Korg Funk 5
