= Cil (singer) =

American singer and songwriter

- Born: Cecilia Webber; 2002 (age 23–24); Fort Collins, Colorado, U.S.
- Genre: R&B
- Occupations: Singer; songwriter
- Label: Warner Records
- Website: cilofficial.com

Cecilia Webber (born 2002), known professionally as Cil, is an American singer and songwriter based in Los Angeles. She has opened for Stevie Nicks and Dua Lipa. She has recorded two EPs: Tears Dry On Their Own (2023) and don't hold me accountable (2025). She is from Fort Collins, Colorado.
