= Cariñito =

Song by Los Hijos del Sol
- Written: 1979
- Genre: Peruvian cumbia
- Length: 4:06
- Label: Sony Music Latin
- Songwriter: Ángel Aníbal

Cariñito is a Peruvian cumbia song written by Limeño Ángel Aníbal Rosado in 1979 and first interpreted by the Peruvian group Los Hijos del Sol. Readapted by numerous international groups and in different musical styles, the song is one of the best-known songs in the realm of Peruvian cumbia and cumbia in general.

== History ==
In 1976, Ángel Aníbal Rosado founded Los Hijos del Sol. In 1979, he composed Cariñito to be adapted by the group led by vocalist Edson Bordaes and accompanied by guitarist José Luis Carvallo. The song became an immediate success and multiple versions and adaptations began to rise internationally.

In 2007, Oliver Conan and Barbes Records, an American music company, presented The Roots of Chicha, a compilation of signature pieces of music derived from the origins of Peruvian tropical music, three of which were by Los Hijos de Sol, one being Cariñito. The compilation received massive popularity, leading to widespread recognition of the song as well as Peruvian cumbia.

In the 2019 Panamerican Games in Lima, the song was played in the inaugural parade of countries during the entry of the Peruvian delegation, played to symbolize progress in Peru and its diverse cultural identity. The song received positive reception from Peruvians, such so that the President of Peru was seen singing and dancing from the Presidential Pulpit in the Estadio Nacional de Lima.

== Other versions ==
- In Colombia, Rodolfo Aicardi of Los Hispanos recorded another version of "Cariñito" in 1979. Aicardi included guitars and saxophones to accompany the song.
- In the midst of the 1980s in Chile, the group Pachuco y la Cubanacan included their own version of "Cariñito".
- In the beginning of 2000, Chilean band Chico Trujillo played their version of "Cariñito, en Berlín y en Chile". This version consolidated its popularity amongst the young populations of Chile.
- In 2007, the Ecuadorian group Kien Mató a Rosero adapted the version using electric guitars in their shows and in 2009 recorded their readapting to the album A lo Rosero.
- The Peruvian music group Bareto used electric guitar to readapt the Rosado's original version and recorded their version to their album Sodoma y Gamarra (2009).
- Los Angeles band La Chamba worked with the original guitarist on the 1979 track, José Luis Carballo, to record their cover of "Cariñito".
- Mexican singer Lila Downs covered the song on her album Al Chile (2019).
- In 2010, the Colombian band Cáctopus made a version of the song, with arrangements for a rock band.
- In 2023, Irish singer/songwriter Kevin Herm Connolly released an English version.
