= Ángel Aníbal Rosado =

Peruvian composer and musician

Ángel Aníbal Rosado Garcîa (May 4, 1942 – September 10, 2008) was a Peruvian composer and musician.

Rosado was born in the Peruvian highlands but moved to Lima as a child. He started out as a composer of huaynos and criollo music. He first took on writing cumbias as a challenge and formed Los Hijos del Sol in 1977. Rosado's first hit was "Si Me Quieres", followed by "Cariñito" in 1978.

Rosada's guitarist, Jse Carvallo, went on to form the group Chacalon y la Nueva Crema, (Taken from the Roots of Chicha liner notes). Rosado's songs have been recorded by Lucila Campos and Eva Ayllón.
