= Paris Texas (brand) =

Shoe brand based in Milan

Paris Texas is a shoe brand based in Milan. It was founded by Annamaria Brivio in 2015.

In 2023, Brazilian conglomerate Arezzo & Co paid $25 million for a 65 percent share in the company. In 2023, Paris Texas partnered with Net-a-porter on a show collection. In 2024, it partnered with Nadia Lee Cohen on the design of two shoes.
