= Blue Valley Songbird =

- DVD cover
- Genre: Musical drama
- Based on: "Blue Valley Songbird" by Dolly Parton
- Written by: Ken Carter; Annette Haywood-Carter
- Directed by: Richard A. Colla
- Starring: Dolly Parton; John Terry; Billy Dean
- Music by: Velton Ray Bunch
- Country of origin: United States
- Original language: English

Production
- Executive producers: Dolly Parton; Freyda Rothstein
- Cinematography: Robert Draper
- Editor: Martin Nicholson
- Running time: 92 minutes
- Production companies: Hearst Entertainment; Dolly Parton Southern Lights Productions

Original release
- Network: Lifetime
- Release: November 1, 1999

Blue Valley Songbird is a 1999 American musical drama television film directed by Richard A. Colla, written by Ken Carter and Annette Haywood-Carter, and starring Dolly Parton, John Terry, and Billy Dean. is based on the song from Parton's 1998 album Hungry Again. It was filmed in Nashville, Tennessee and originally premiered on Lifetime on November 1, 1999.

== Plot ==
Country singer Leanna Taylor struggles to escape from her controlling manager/boyfriend Hank, as well as her troubled past. After turning to her guitarist Bobby, Leanna finally faces her past, including her estranged mother and the death of her father.

Through flashbacks, Leanna's father is shown to be an abusive and controlling man who would not allow Leanna to sing for anyone but himself, and once, viciously attacked a boy Leanna was playing with while, in the present, during this particular flashback, Hank attacks one of Leanna's musicians in a jealous rage. Leanna finds herself reliving painful memories of her controlling father, awakened by Hank's domineering behavior. In another flashback, Leanna's father threatens her after she hits him with a tire iron while he is physically abusing Leanna's mother. Leanna's mother eventually sent her off to Nashville where, free of her father, she joined a church choir.

In the end, Leanna is able to escape from Hank and reconcile with her mother before entering the studio to cut her first record. The film ends with Leanna singing "Blue Valley Songbird" in concert with Hank watching from the back of the room before leaving.

== Cast ==
- Dolly Parton as Leanna Taylor
  - Teagan Eley as young Leanna
- John Terry as Hank Hatcher
- Billy Dean as Bobby Grissom
- Beth Grant as Ruby
- Kimberley Kates as Thelma Russell
- Peggy Walton-Walker as Ora Taylor
- Ed Bruce as Howard Franklin
- Bob Morrison as Leanna's Father

== Songs ==
There was no official soundtrack released, but some songs are available on other Dolly releases as noted below.

"Blue Valley Songbird" - Written and Performed by Dolly Parton
(available on the Hungry Again album)

"I Hope You're Never Happy" - Written by Dolly Parton
Performed by Dolly Parton featuring Billy Dean
(available on the Real Love album)

"Wildflowers" - Written and Performed by Dolly Parton
(available on the Trio album with Linda Ronstadt & Emmylou Harris)

"We Might Be In Love" - Written by Dolly Parton
Performed by Dolly Parton and Billy Dean

"My Blue Tears" - Written and Performed by Dolly Parton
(available on the Coat of Many Colors, Heartsongs and Little Sparrow albums)

"Runaway Feeling" - Written by Dolly Parton
Performed by Dolly Parton featuring Billy Dean
(available on the Eagle When She Flies album - Dolly only)

"Amazing Grace" - Written by John Newton
Performed by Dolly Parton
(available on the Precious Memories album)

"Angel Band" - (Traditional)
Performed by Dolly Parton

== Announced remake ==
In July 2021, Deadline reported that this film, alongside The Babysitter's Seduction, Sex, Lies & Obsession, Sex & Mrs. X, Santa Who?, A Different Kind of Christmas and over 100 other films in the Hearst Entertainment library was up for consideration to be remade by the library's IP holder, Lionsgate, alongside independent production and distribution company MarVista Entertainment. Both companies, who will jointly distribute these films, didn't elaborate on certain details, but claimed that the films will be made to target "digitally native audiences" and have set their sights on releasing them to a streaming service.
