= Precious Memories (Dolly Parton album) =

Studio album by Dolly Parton
- Released: April 17, 1999
- Recorded: 1998
- Studio: Studio 19; Studio 20
- Genre: Gospel
- Length: 35:33
- Label: Blue Eye
- Producer: Richie Owens

Dolly Parton chronology
Trio II (1999)	Precious Memories (1999)	The Grass Is Blue (1999)

Precious Memories is the thirty-sixth solo studio album by Dolly Parton. It was released on April 17, 1999, by Blue Eye Records. The album is sold exclusively at Dollywood and was released at the opening of the park's fourteenth season (1999–2000) with all proceeds going to the Dollywood Foundation.

== Background ==
Parton performed many songs from the album on a TNN special, Dolly Parton's Precious Memories, that aired on April 1, 1999, as a part of TNN's 20th Century Hitmakers Week. The special also included performances by Alison Krauss and Union Station and the Cox Family. Parton's siblings Randy Parton and Rachel Dennison also appeared on the show.

Parton spoke in an interview about how close her roots in religion, family and music are, saying:

Gospel was an important part of life in the Smoky Mountains where I grew up...and religion was a part of everyday life. There's something unique about family harmony singing, "blood harmonies," we call 'em, and not surprisingly, many of our greatest groups are families who started out singing in church together. There was even a group called the Parton Family Traveling Band.

— Dolly Parton, Country Weekly - March 23, 1999

== Track listing ==
No.	Title	Writer(s)	Length
1.	"Precious Memories"	J. B. F. Wright	3:15
2.	"Power in the Blood"	Lewis E. Jones	2:11
3.	"In the Sweet Bye-and-Bye"	S. Fillmore Bennett; Joseph P. Webster	3:37
4.	"Church in the Wildwood"	William S. Pitts	2:39
5.	"Keep on the Firing Line"	Bessie F. Hatcher	2:54
6.	"Amazing Grace"	John Newton	3:48
7.	"Old Time Religion"	Traditional	1:36
8.	"Softly and Tenderly"	Will L. Thompson	3:14
9.	"Farther Along"	Traditional	3:43
10.	"What a Friend We Have in Jesus"	Joseph M. Scriven; Charles C. Converse	3:47
11.	"In the Garden"	C. Austin Miles	2:54
12.	"When the Roll Is Called Up Yonder"	James Milton Black	2:03
Total length:			35:33

== Personnel ==
Adapted from the album liner notes.

- Mark Brooks - bass
- Danny Brown - engineer
- Sam Bush - mandolin, fiddle
- Gary Davis - acoustic guitar, banjo, electric guitar
- Rachel Dennison - backing vocals
- Bob Grundner - drums
- Steven Hill - backing vocals
- The Kinfolks (Louis Owens, Bill Owens, John Henry Owens, Dorothy Jo Owens) - backing vocals
- The Kingdom Heirs (Steve French, Arthur Rice, David Sutton, Eric Bennett) - backing vocals
- Johnny Lauffer - piano, strings, organ
- Gary Mackey - fiddle, mandolin
- Liana Manis - backing vocals
- Dave Matthews - recording, mixing
- Richie Owens - producer
- Jim Pace - additional recording overdubs
- Dolly Parton - lead vocals, song arrangements
- Randy Parton - backing vocals
- Wade Perry - cover design
- Darrell Puett - engineer
- Al Perkins - steel guitar, dobro guitar, kona lap guitar
