= The Grass Is Blue =

Studio album by Dolly Parton
- Released: October 26, 1999
- Recorded: August 1999
- Studios: The Sound Kitchen (Nashville); The Doghouse (Nashville)
- Genre: Bluegrass
- Length: 44:59
- Labels: Sugar Hill; Blue Eye
- Producer: Steve Buckingham

Dolly Parton chronology
Precious Memories (1999)	The Grass Is Blue (1999)	Little Sparrow (2001)

Singles from The Grass Is Blue
- 1. "A Few Old Memories" Released: October 25, 1999; 2. "Silver Dagger" Released: February 2000

The Grass Is Blue is the thirty-seventh solo studio album by American singer-songwriter Dolly Parton. It was released on October 26, 1999, by Sugar Hill and Blue Eye Records. The album won a Grammy for Best Bluegrass Album and "Travelin' Prayer" was nominated for Best Female Country Vocal Performance.

== Background ==
Parton found herself without a record label for the second time in a year when Decca Records closed its Nashville office in early 1999, just months after the release of Hungry Again. Throughout the 1990s, she had been losing ground with country radio, though her album sales had remained strong for much of that time. The idea for the project was brought to Parton's attention one night in July 1999 when she was having dinner with Steve Buckingham. He mentioned to her that bluegrass fans, when asked which artist they would most like to make a bluegrass album, overwhelmingly cited her. Parton told Billboard, "We were both shocked, but then I thought, since I manage myself now and have my own label and can do what I want, why not do it?" By the end of August 1999, Parton had recorded the album in Nashville with Buckingham producing and top musicians such as Jerry Douglas, Sam Bush, Stuart Duncan, Alison Krauss, and Rhonda Vincent accompanying. Speaking about the song selection, Parton said, "I've always loved bluegrass, having grown up in and around mountain music and bluegrass, so I chose some songs I've been singing all my life." Parton said of the recording process, "It went really fast because these are the world's best bluegrass pickers and singers, who've been doing these songs forever!"

== Content ==
The album includes a mixture of Parton originals and folk and bluegrass standards, as well as a Billy Joel cover. "Silver Dagger", a late nineteenth century ballad, had been popularized by Joan Baez during the early 1960s. Parton had originally written "Steady as the Rain" for her younger sister Stella Parton, who had a top 40 country hit with the song in 1979. "Will He Be Waiting for Me" is an updated version of a song which Parton originally recorded for her 1972 album, Touch Your Woman. The album also includes a cover of the Blackfoot song "Train, Train".

== Release and promotion ==
The album was announced by Sugar Hill Records on August 24, 1999. In the press release, Parton was quoted saying,

"It's perfectly natural for me to do a bluegrass album as I have loved that style of music all my life. So much of my own music, the songs I write and sing, have so many of the same colors. For years I have looked forward to doing a bluegrass album. Although I have done some bluegrass songs scattered around in shows and in certain albums, this is one of the most exciting things I have done in years and one of the most exciting things ever."

Parton made several television appearances to promote the album. The day of the album's release she made an appearance on Live with Regis & Kelly. She appeared on the Tonight Show with Jay Leno on November 2 and performed "Train, Train". Television appearances continued in February 2000 to promote the album's second single, "Silver Dagger". Parton performed the single February 28 on the Late Show with David Letterman and February 29 on Live with Regis & Kelly.

== Critical reception ==
Professional ratings
Review scores
Source	Rating
AllMusic	4.5/5 stars
Austin Chronicle	3 stars
Robert Christgau	(2-star Honorable Mention)
The Encyclopedia of Popular Music	4/5 stars

Upon its release, the album received much praise among music critics. James Hunter of Rolling Stone gave a positive review of the album, saying, "On recent recordings like Trio II, with Emmylou Harris and Linda Ronstadt, Parton has gone home, but not with the curled-tongue abandon she brings to The Grass Is Blue, where she re-tackles bluegrass, country and traditional songs with brio...it leaves the earth often...Without that almost punk-style independence, you can't have new legends, country or otherwise." Writing for AllMusic, Philip Van Vleck gave to album 4.5 out of 5 stars and said that Parton has "always followed her own muse; this time it has led her to a singular interpretation of bluegrass that is one of the important bluegrass releases of 1999." Jerry Renshaw reviewed the album for the Austin Chronicle and gave the album 3 stars, saying that "Parton's familiar vibrato soars over the mountain-music instruments like it was born to do just that."

In addition to rejuvenating Parton's career, the album, along with the O Brother, Where Art Thou? soundtrack and the work of Alison Krauss, is credited with making bluegrass a hugely popular musical genre during the early 2000s.

== Commercial performance ==
The album peaked at No. 24 on the US Billboard Top Country Albums chart and No. 198 on the US Billboard 200 chart. The album peaked at No. 8 on the UK OCC Country Albums chart. As of December 2003, the album has sold 195,000 copies in the United States.

The first single, "A Few Old Memories", was sent to country radio stations in October 1999 and did not chart. "Silver Dagger" was sent to folk stations as the album's second single in February 2000 and did not chart.

== Accolades ==
At the 43rd Annual Grammy Awards, the album won Best Bluegrass Album and "Travelin' Prayer" was nominated for Best Female Country Vocal Performance. The album won Album of the Year at the 2000 International Bluegrass Music Awards.

== Track listing ==
No.	Title	Writer(s)	Length
1.	"Travelin' Prayer"	Billy Joel	4:16
2.	"Cash on the Barrelhead"	Charlie Louvin; Ira Louvin	3:08
3.	"A Few Old Memories"	Hazel Dickens	4:02
4.	"I'm Gonna Sleep with One Eye Open"	Lester Flatt	3:05
5.	"Steady as the Rain"	Dolly Parton	3:05
6.	"I Still Miss Someone"	Johnny Cash; Roy Cash, Jr.	3:38
7.	"Endless Stream of Tears"	Parton	2:40
8.	"Silver Dagger"	Traditional	4:55
9.	"Train, Train"	Shorty Medlocke	2:50
10.	"I Wonder Where You Are Tonight"	Johnny Bond	3:14
11.	"Will He Be Waiting for Me"	Parton	3:26
12.	"The Grass Is Blue"	Parton	3:45
13.	"I Am Ready"	Rachel Dennison	2:45
Total length:			44:59

== Personnel ==
Adapted from the album liner notes.

- Barry Bales – bass, harmony vocals
- Steve Buckingham – producer, rhythm guitar
- Sam Bush – mandolin, harmony vocals
- Tim Campbell – recording studio photos
- Jennie Carey – production assistant
- Dennis Carney – cover photography
- Jerry Douglas – dobro, harmony vocals
- Rob Draper – recording studio photo
- Stuart Duncan – fiddle, harmony vocals
- Sandy Jenkins – assistant engineer
- Alison Krauss – harmony vocals
- Keith Little – harmony vocals
- Patty Loveless – harmony vocals
- Claire Lynch – harmony vocals
- Sue Meyer – album design
- Jim Mills – banjo
- Marshall Morgan – additional engineering
- Louis Nunley – harmony vocals
- Alan O'Bryant – harmony vocals
- Gary Paczosa – recording, mixing
- Dolly Parton – lead vocals, harmony vocals
- Cheryl Riddle – hair
- Doug Sax – mastering
- Toby Seay – additional engineering, digital editing
- Bryan Sutton – guitar
- Chuck Turner – digital editing
- Dan Tyminski – harmony vocals
- Darrin Vincent – harmony vocals
- Rhonda Vincent – harmony vocals

== Charts ==
Chart (1999-2001)	Peak position
UK Independent Albums (Official Charts)	38
UK Album Downloads (Official Charts)	37
UK Country Albums (Official Charts)	7
US Billboard 200	198
US Top Country Albums (Billboard)	24

== Release history ==
Region	Date	Format	Label	Ref.
US & Canada	October 26, 1999	CD; cassette	Sugar Hill; Blue Eye	
Europe	March 1, 2000	CD; cassette	Sugar Hill; Blue Eye	
Various	January 3, 2006	Digital download	Sugar Hill; Blue Eye	
US & Canada	April 18, 2015	LP	Sugar Hill; Blue Eye	
