= Dolly Parton: Here I Am =

2019 British biographical documentary film

- Promotional poster
- Directed by: Francis Whately
- Country of origin: United Kingdom
- Original language: English

Production
- Producer: Francis Whately
- Cinematography: Simon Dinsell; Justin Evans; Richard Numeroff; Kev Robertson
- Editor: Anna Price
- Running time: 90 minutes
- Production company: Man Alive Productions

Original release
- Release: December 26, 2019

Dolly Parton: Here I Am is a 2019 British biographical documentary film, directed by Francis Whately. The film offers a look into the life and musical career of Dolly Parton, which is told through interviews with friends, companions, and the artist herself.
