= The Book Lady =

- Directed by: Natasha Ryan
- Produced by: Brad Horvath
- Starring: Dolly Parton, Miley Cyrus, Keith Urban, Sarah Harmer, Justin Rutledge, Natalie MacMaster, Robert Munsch
- Release date: 2008
- Country: Canada
- Language: English

The Book Lady is a documentary about country music legend and pop-culture icon Dolly Parton’s campaign for children’s literacy.

Dolly Parton, Miley Cyrus, Keith Urban, Canadian singer–songwriters Sarah Harmer and Justin Rutledge, fiddler Natalie MacMaster and children's author Robert Munsch are featured in the documentary, which chronicles the launch of Parton’s “Imagination Library” in Canada.

The Book Lady was directed by Natasha Ryan, produced by Brad Horvath and executive-produced by filmmaker Thom Fitzgerald and Doug Pettigrew. It will air on CBC Television, Bravo! and BookTelevision in Canada.

It had its international premiere at the 28th Atlantic Film Festival in Halifax, Nova Scotia, on September 20, 2008.
