= Dolly Parton =

American singer-songwriter (1946–2026)

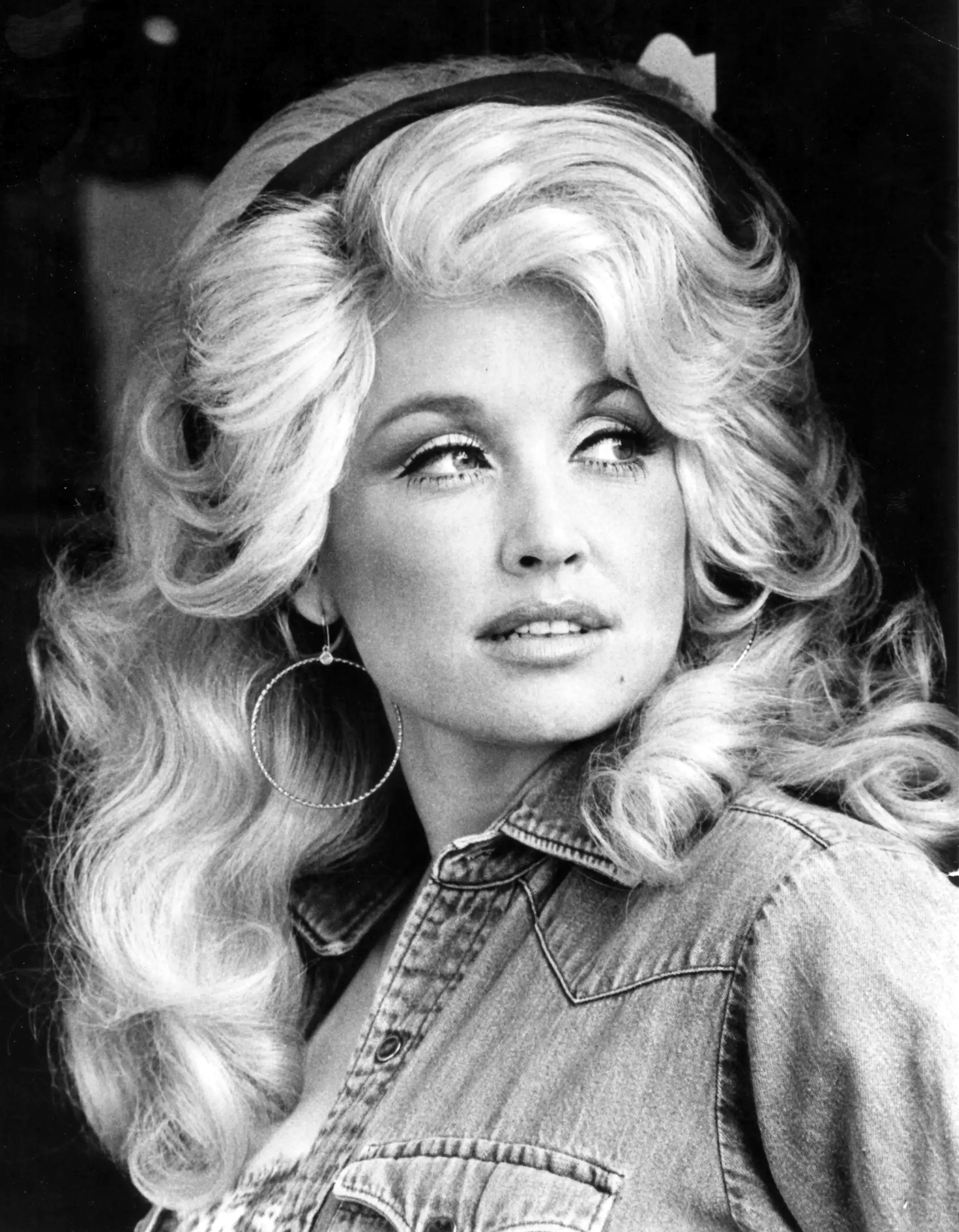
- Parton in 1977
- Born: Dolly Rebecca Parton; January 19, 1946; Pittman Center, Tennessee, US
- Died: August 25, 2026 (aged 80); Nashville, Tennessee, US
- Occupations: Singer-songwriter; actress; philanthropist; businesswoman
- Years active: 1956–2026
- Works: Filmography
- Spouse: Carl Dean (m. 1966; died 2025)
- Relatives: Bill Owens (uncle); Randy Parton (brother); Stella Parton (sister); Rachel Parton George (sister); Heidi Parton (niece)
- Awards: Full list
- Musical career
- Origin: Nashville, Tennessee
- Genres: Country; pop; bluegrass; gospel
- Instruments: Vocals; guitar
- Works: Albums; singles; songs recorded; Wagoner and Parton discography
- Labels: Goldband; Mercury; Monument; RCA Victor; Columbia; Warner Bros.; Rising Tide; Decca; Sugar Hill; Dolly; Butterfly
- Website: dollyparton.com

Dolly Rebecca Parton Dean (née Parton; January 19, 1946 – August 25, 2026) was an American singer-songwriter, actress, philanthropist, and businesswoman. Dubbed the "Queen of Country", Parton was one of the most successful performers in the history of country music. She was also known for her cultural influence, particularly through Dollywood and the Dollywood Foundation. With more than a hundred million records sold, Parton was among the best-selling music artists in history.

Born and raised in East Tennessee, Parton wrote her first song at age six, performed regularly on television by age ten, made her first recording a year later, and became a professional songwriter at sixteen. After writing songs for others, she released her debut album, Hello, I'm Dolly in 1967, starting her nearly sixty-year career. Parton released 49 studio albums and wrote more than 3,000 songs, including "I Will Always Love You" – a two-time US country chart-topper and an international success for Whitney Houston that became the best-selling single by a woman – "Jolene", "Coat of Many Colors", and "9 to 5". The lattermost, as well as the Kenny Rogers duet "Islands in the Stream", reached No. 1 on the Billboard Hot 100. Her final solo studio album, Rockstar (2023), became her highest-charting album on the Billboard 200, reaching No. 3.

Parton starred in the comedy films 9 to 5 (1980), The Best Little Whorehouse in Texas (1982), Rhinestone (1984), Steel Magnolias (1989), Straight Talk (1992), and Joyful Noise (2012). She produced and starred in a series of Netflix features including Christmas on the Square (2021), which earned her a Primetime Emmy Award. She also played Aunt Dolly in Hannah Montana (2006–2010), hosted Saturday Night Live (1989), and guest-starred on Reba (2005) and Grace and Frankie (2022). She wrote the music and lyrics for Broadway's 9 to 5 (2009), which earned her a Tony Award nomination. Her life will be depicted in Dolly: A True Original Musical (2026).

Parton's music received 52 gold, platinum, and multi-platinum certifications from the Recording Industry Association of America (RIAA). Her accolades include eleven Grammy Awards and three Emmy Awards. She logged 25 No. 1 Billboard country singles (tied with Reba McEntire for the most by a woman), 44 career Top 10 country albums (a record for any artist), and 110 career-charted singles over forty years. Parton was honored with a star on the Hollywood Walk of Fame (1984), the National Medal of Arts (2004), the Kennedy Center Honor (2006), the Grammy Lifetime Achievement Award (2011), and the Jean Hersholt Humanitarian Award (2025).

== Early life ==
Dolly Rebecca Parton was born on January 19, 1946, in a one-room cabin on the banks of the Little Pigeon River in Pittman Center, Tennessee. She was the fourth of twelve children born to Avie Lee Carolina (née Owens) and Robert Lee Parton. Her three elder siblings are Willadeene, David Wilburn, and Coy Denver; her younger siblings are Robert Lee "Bobby" Jr., Stella Mae, Cassie Nan, Randle Huston "Randy", Larry Garrold (who died shortly after birth in 1955), twins Frieda Estelle and Floyd Estel, and Rachel Ann. Parton's middle name came from her maternal great-great-grandmother, Rebecca Whitted (née Dunn).

Parton's father, who went by his middle name "Lee", worked in the mountains of East Tennessee, first as a sharecropper and later tending his own small tobacco farm and acreage. He also worked construction jobs to supplement the farm's small income. Despite his illiteracy, Parton often said her father was one of the smartest people she had ever known with regard to business and making a profit.

Parton's mother, Avie Lee, was a resilient individual. She was often pregnant while simultaneously breastfeeding her youngest infant. Lacking prenatal vitamins, proper nutrition, and a chance to recuperate, her body was weak. She often maintained the household solely through the help of Parton's older sister, Willadeene. While pregnant in 1955, Avie Lee contracted spinal meningitis and wasn't expected to live. In the aftermath of the illness, she went into premature labor and delivered a son. The infant, Larry, died after twenty-four hours.

Parton credited her musical abilities to Avie Lee's influence. Despite frequent physical weakness, she entertained Parton and her other children with Great Smoky Mountain folklore and old world ballads. The ballads had been brought to the early United States, particularly southern Appalachia, by immigrants from the British Isles. Having descended from parents with Welsh ancestry, Avie Lee grew up singing the ballads. Avie Lee's father, Jake Robert Owens, was a Pentecostal preacher who pastored the Church of God, and Parton and her siblings attended church there. Music played an important role in Parton's early life. Her earliest public performances were in the church, beginning at age six. At seven, she started playing a homemade guitar. When she was eight, her uncle bought her first guitar.

When Parton was still young, her family moved to a two‑room cabin and farm on nearby Locust Ridge. Most of her cherished childhood memories happened there. A replica of the Locust Ridge cabin is displayed at her namesake theme park. The Partons' small subsistence farm on Locust Ridge was in a predominantly Pentecostal area located north of the Greenbrier Valley of the Great Smoky Mountains. The farm acreage and surrounding woodland inspired her to write "My Tennessee Mountain Home" in the 1970s. Years after the farm was sold, Parton bought it back in the late 1980s. Her brother Bobby helped with the restoration of the building as well as new construction.

Parton said her family was "dirt poor". Her father paid missionary Robert F. Thomas with a sack of cornmeal for delivering her. Later in life, Parton wrote a song about Thomas. She also outlined her family's poverty in her early songs "Coat of Many Colors" and "In the Good Old Days (When Times Were Bad)". The Parton family was well-fed despite their poverty, and her 2024 cookbook, Good Lookin' Cookin' (co-written with her sister Rachel), recalls numerous family meals. The day after graduating from Sevier County High School in Sevierville, Tennessee, in 1964, Parton moved to Nashville, Tennessee.

== Music career ==
=== 1956–1966: Early work and songwriting ===
Parton began performing as a child, singing on local radio and television programs in the East Tennessee area. By age ten she had appeared on The Cas Walker Show on both WIVK Radio and WBIR‑TV in Knoxville, Tennessee. At thirteen, she recorded the single "Puppy Love" for the Louisiana label Goldband Records and appeared at the Grand Ole Opry, where she first met Johnny Cash. He introduced her as "a little girl here from up in East Tennessee" and encouraged her to follow her own instincts regarding her career.

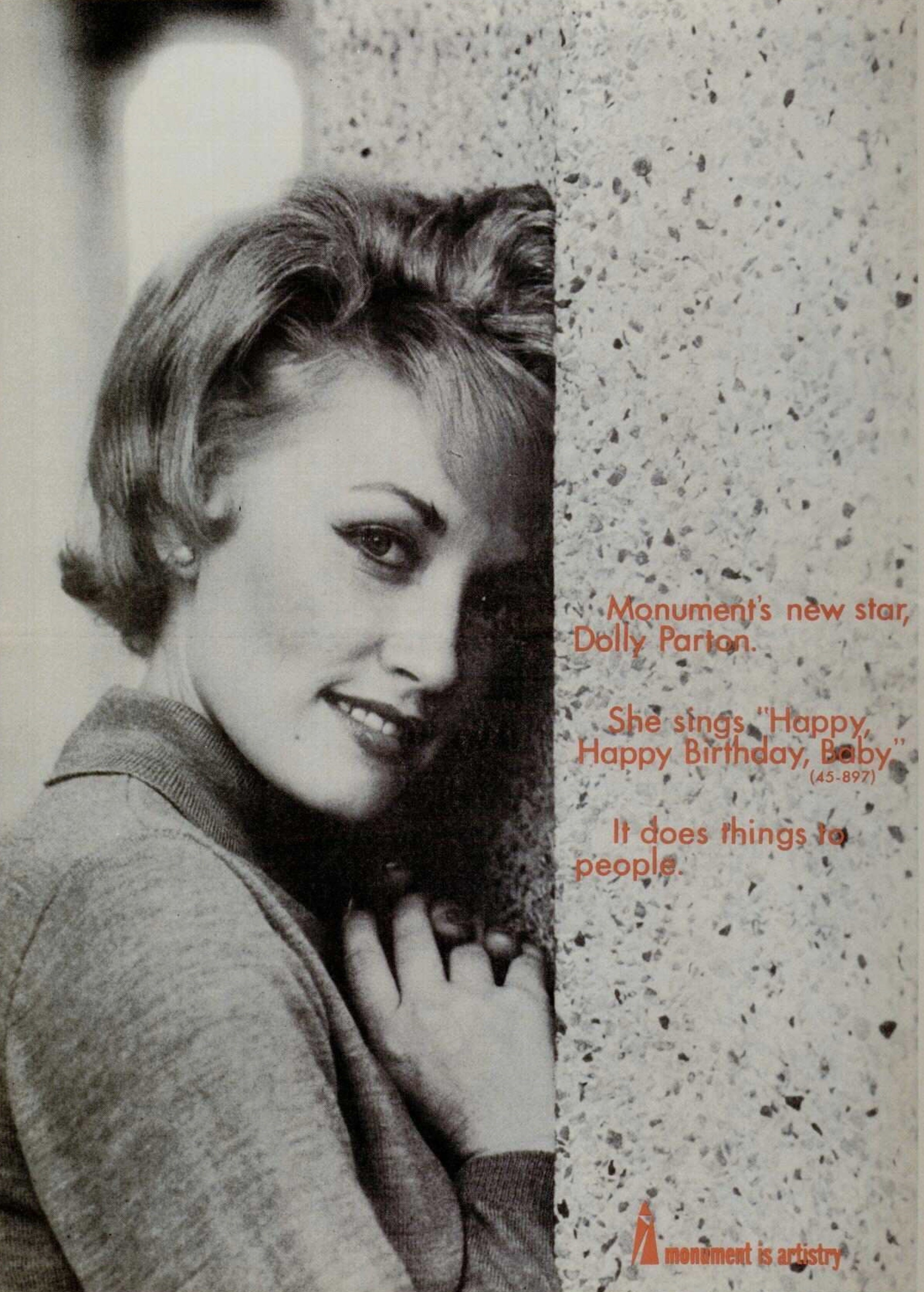
Billboard ad, 1965

Parton's initial success came as a songwriter. She signed with Combine Publishing shortly after her arrival in Nashville. Working with her frequent songwriting partner, her uncle Bill Owens, she wrote several charting singles, including two Top 10 hits for Bill Phillips: "Put It Off Until Tomorrow" and "The Company You Keep" (1966). She also wrote Skeeter Davis's No. 11 hit "Fuel to the Flame" (1967). Her songs were recorded by many other artists during this period, including Kitty Wells and Hank Williams Jr.

At 19, she signed with Monument Records in 1965, where she was initially pitched as a bubblegum pop singer. She released several singles, but only "Happy, Happy Birthday Baby" charted, and it failed to reach the Billboard Hot 100. Although she wanted to record country material, Monument resisted, thinking her unusually high soprano voice was not suited to the genre.

After Bill Phillips' recording of her composition "Put It Off Until Tomorrow" reached No. 6 on the country chart in 1966, the label relented and allowed her to record country. Her first country single, "Dumb Blonde", written by Curly Putman, reached No. 24 on the country chart in 1967. It was followed by "Something Fishy", which reached No. 17. Both singles appeared on her first full-length album, Hello, I'm Dolly.

=== 1967–1975: Country music success ===
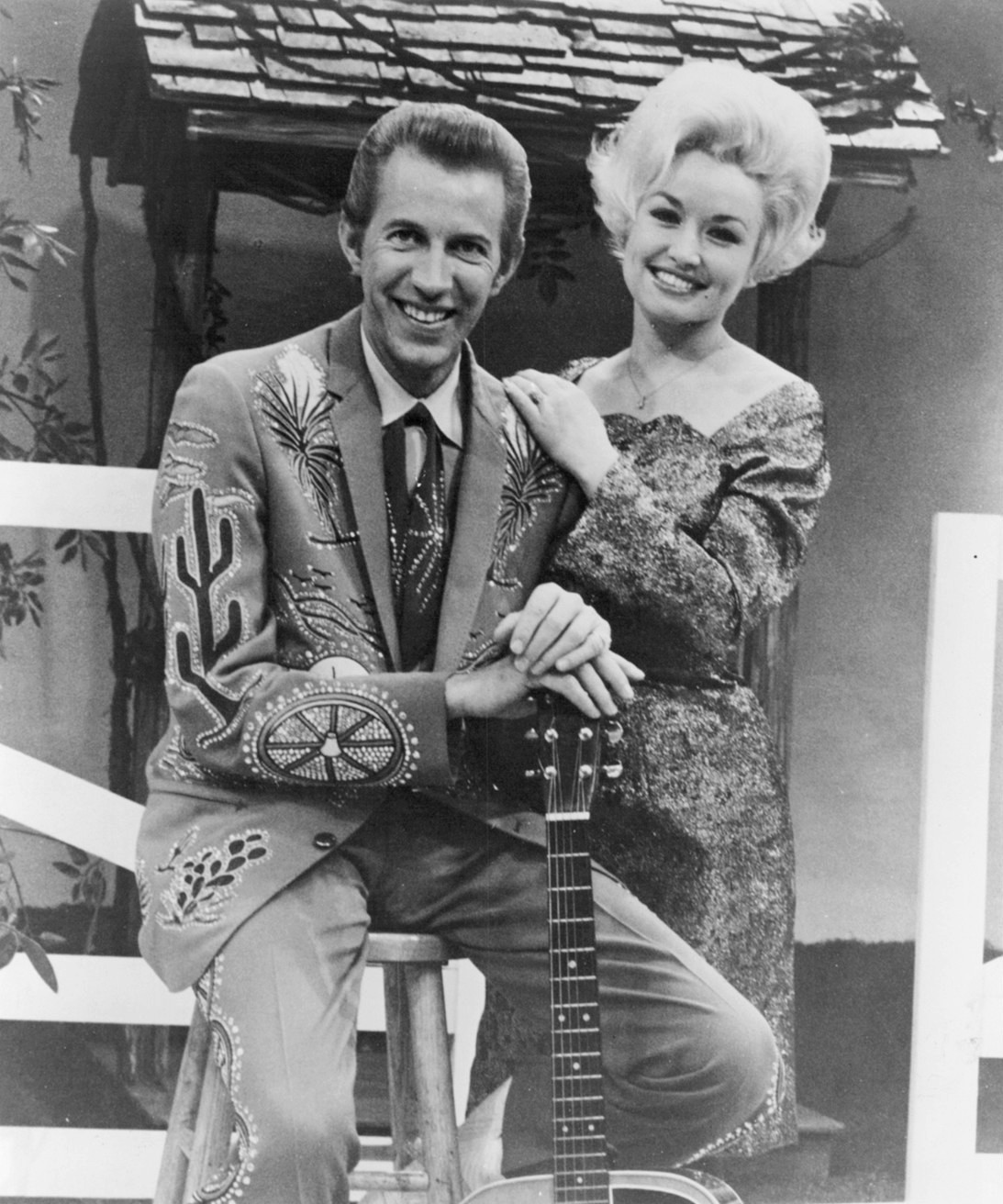
Porter Wagoner and Parton in 1969

In 1967, musician and country music entertainer Porter Wagoner invited Parton to join The Porter Wagoner Show, offering her a regular spot on his weekly syndicated television program and in his road show. As documented in her 1994 autobiography, much of Wagoner's audience was initially unhappy that Parton had replaced previous performer Norma Jean who had left the show, sometimes chanting loudly for Norma Jean from the audience. With Wagoner's assistance, Parton was eventually accepted. Wagoner convinced his label, RCA Victor, to sign her. RCA decided to protect its investment by releasing her first single as a duet with Wagoner. That song, a remake of Tom Paxton's "The Last Thing on My Mind", released in late 1967, reached the country Top 10 in January 1968, launching a six-year run of uninterrupted Top 10 singles for the pair.

Parton's first solo single for RCA Victor, "Just Because I'm a Woman", was released in the summer of 1968 and reached No. 17. For the next two years, none of her solo efforts – even "In the Good Old Days (When Times Were Bad)", which later became a standard – were as successful as her duets with Wagoner. The duo was named Vocal Group of the Year in 1968 by the Country Music Association, but Parton's solo records continued to be ignored. Wagoner had a significant financial stake in her future; from 1969 he was her co-producer and owned nearly half of Owe-Par, the publishing company Parton had founded with Bill Owens. Parton joined the Nashville Association of Musicians, a labor union representing professional musicians, in 1968 and remained a dues-paying member until her death in 2026.

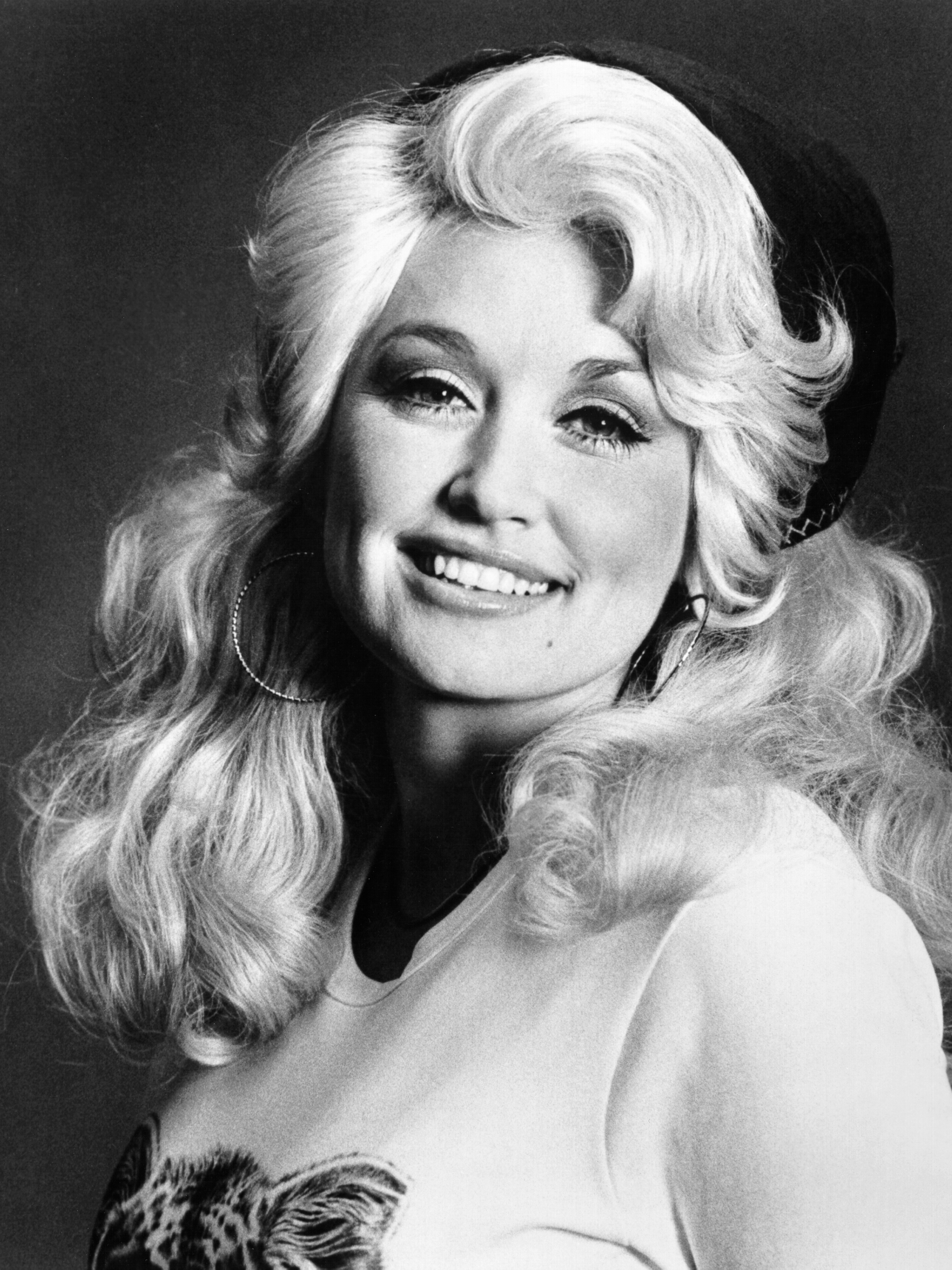
Parton in a 1977 RCA Records press photo

By 1970, both Parton and Wagoner had grown frustrated by her lack of solo chart success. Wagoner persuaded Parton to record Jimmie Rodgers' "Mule Skinner Blues". The record reached No. 3, followed by her first No. 1 single, "Joshua" in February 1971. For the next two years she had numerous solo hits in addition to her duets, including her signature "Coat of Many Colors". Further Top 20 singles included "The Right Combination" and "Burning the Midnight Oil" (both duets with Wagoner, 1971); "Lost Forever in Your Kiss" (with Wagoner), "Touch Your Woman" (1972); "My Tennessee Mountain Home", and "Travelin' Man" (1973).

While her solo singles and the Wagoner duets were successful, her biggest success from this period was "Jolene". Released in late 1973, the song topped the country chart in February 1974 and reached the lower regions of the Hot 100. It also eventually charted in the UK, reaching No. 7 in 1976, Parton's first UK success. Parton, who had always envisioned a solo career, decided to leave Wagoner's show and stopped appearing in mid-1974. The pair performed their last duet concert in April 1974 although they remained affiliated, with Wagoner helping to produce her records through 1975. Their final release as a duo was 1975's Say Forever You'll Be Mine.

In 1974, Parton's song, "I Will Always Love You", written about her professional break from Wagoner, went to No. 1 on the country chart. Around the same time, Elvis Presley indicated that he wanted to record the song. Parton was interested until Presley's manager, Colonel Tom Parker, told her that it was standard procedure for the songwriter to sign over half the publishing rights to any song recorded by Presley. Parton refused. That decision was later credited with earning her many millions of dollars in royalties from the song. That year, Parton had three solo singles reach No. 1 on the country chart, "Jolene", "I Will Always Love You", and "Love Is Like a Butterfly", and the duet with Wagoner, "Please Don't Stop Loving Me". She again topped the country chart in 1975 with "The Bargain Store".

=== 1976–1986: A broader audience ===
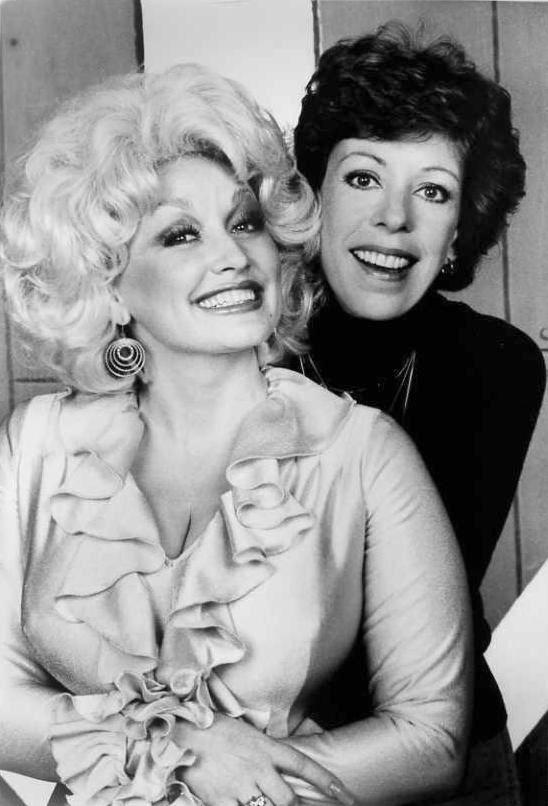
Parton with Carol Burnett in 1979

Between 1974 and 1980, Parton had a series of country hits with eight singles reaching No. 1. Her influence on pop culture was reflected in the many performers who covered her songs, including mainstream and crossover artists such as Olivia Newton-John, Emmylou Harris, and Linda Ronstadt.

Parton began a high-profile crossover campaign, aiming her music in a more mainstream direction and increasing her visibility outside country music. In 1976, she began working closely with Sandy Gallin, who became her personal manager for the next 25 years. With her 1976 album All I Can Do, which she co-produced with Wagoner, Parton took a more active role in production and began aiming her music at a pop audience. Her first self-produced effort, New Harvest...First Gathering (1977), highlighted her pop sensibilities in both song choice and production; the album included covers of the pop and R&B classics "My Girl" and "Higher and Higher". Though well received and topping the US country albums chart, neither the album nor its single "Light of a Clear Blue Morning" made much impact on the pop charts.

After New Harvest's unsuccessful crossover performance, Parton turned to pop producer Gary Klein for her next album. The result, 1977's Here You Come Again, became her first million-seller, topping the country album chart and reaching No. 20 on the pop chart. The Barry Mann-Cynthia Weil-penned title track topped the country singles chart and became Parton's first Top 10 single on the pop chart (No. 3). A second single, the double A‑sided "Two Doors Down"/"It's All Wrong, But It's All Right", topped the country chart and crossed into the pop Top 20. For the remainder of the 1970s and into the early 1980s, many of her singles climbed both charts simultaneously. Her albums during this period were developed specifically for pop-crossover.

In 1978, Parton won a Grammy Award for Best Female Country Vocal Performance for her album Here You Come Again. She continued to have success with "Heartbreaker" (1978), "Baby I'm Burnin'" (1979), and "You're the Only One" (1979), all of which charted in the pop Top 40 and topped the country chart. "Sweet Summer Lovin'" (1979) became her first single in two years not to top the country chart, though it reached the Top 10. Her visibility increased with numerous television appearances. Parton submitted to a highly publicized candid interview on a Barbara Walters Special in 1977, timed to coincide with Here You Come Again's release, against her friends' advice. Walters was dismissive, saying "You don't have to look like this," and asking "Do you ever feel that you're a joke?" Parton indicated that she was deliberately in control of her image and replied, smiling, "The joke's on the public. I know exactly what I'm doing and I can change it at any time ... I'm sure of myself. I'm sure of my talent."

In 1978 she appeared on Cher's ABC television special and her own joint CBS special with Carol Burnett, Dolly & Carol in Nashville. Parton served as one of three co-hosts, along with Roy Clark and Glen Campbell, on the CBS special Fifty Years of Country Music. In 1979, she hosted the NBC special The Seventies: An Explosion of Country Music at Ford's Theatre in Washington, DC, a performance attended by President Jimmy Carter. Her commercial success grew in 1980, with three consecutive No. 1 country hits: "Starting Over Again", "Old Flames Can't Hold a Candle to You", and "9 to 5", which topped both the country and the pop charts in early 1981. She had another Top 10 single that year with "Making Plans" from her 1980 album with Wagoner, released as part of a lawsuit settlement between the pair.

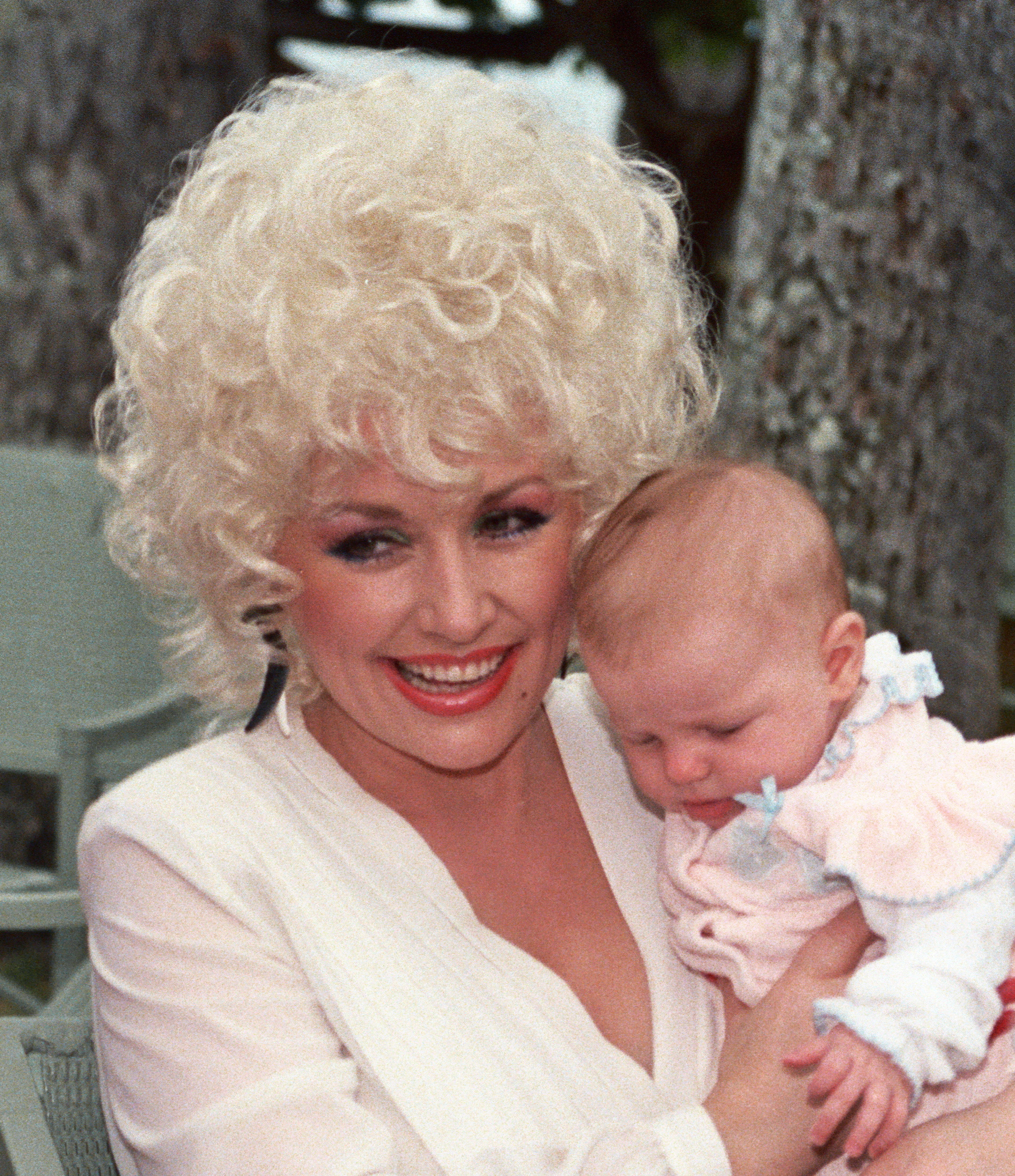
Parton holding a baby in Honolulu, Hawaii, 1983

The theme song from the 1980 feature film 9 to 5 (1980), in which she starred with Jane Fonda and Lily Tomlin, reached No. 1 on country, pop, and adult-contemporary charts in February 1981, giving her a triple No. 1 hit. Parton became one of the few female country singers to have a No. 1 single on the country and pop charts simultaneously. The song received a nomination for an Academy Award for Best Original Song. Her singles continued to appear consistently in the country's Top 10.

Between 1981 and 1985, she had twelve Top 10 hits, half of them reaching No. 1. She continued to make inroads on the pop charts. A re-recorded version of "I Will Always Love You", from the feature film The Best Little Whorehouse in Texas (1982), reached the lower end of the Top 50 that year, and her duet with Kenny Rogers, "Islands in the Stream", written by the Bee Gees and produced by Barry Gibb, spent two weeks at No. 1 in 1983.

In the mid-1980s, her record sales were still relatively strong. "Save the Last Dance for Me", "Tennessee Homesick Blues", "God Won't Get You" (1984), "Real Love" (another duet with Kenny Rogers), "Don't Call It Love" (1985), and "Think About Love" (1986) all reached the country Top 10. "Tennessee Homesick Blues", "Think About Love", and "Real Love" reached No. 1 and became modest crossover hits. Despite this success, RCA Records did not renew her contract in 1986, and she signed with Columbia Records in 1987.

=== 1987–2005: Country and bluegrass period ===
With Emmylou Harris and Linda Ronstadt, Parton released Trio (1987) to critical acclaim. The album revitalized her music career, spending five weeks at No. 1 on Billboard's Country Albums chart and reaching the Top 10 on the Billboard 200. It sold several million copies and produced four Top 10 country hits, including Phil Spector's "To Know Him Is to Love Him", which went to No. 1. Trio won the Grammy Award for Best Country Performance by a Duo or Group with Vocal and was nominated for Album of the Year. A further attempt at pop success with Rainbow (1987), which included the single "The River Unbroken", was not a success and its poor commercial performance led Parton to refocus on country material. White Limozeen (1989) produced two No. 1 hits, "Why'd You Come in Here Lookin' Like That" and "Yellow Roses". Although her career appeared revived, it proved brief before contemporary country music in the early 1990s moved most veteran artists off the charts.

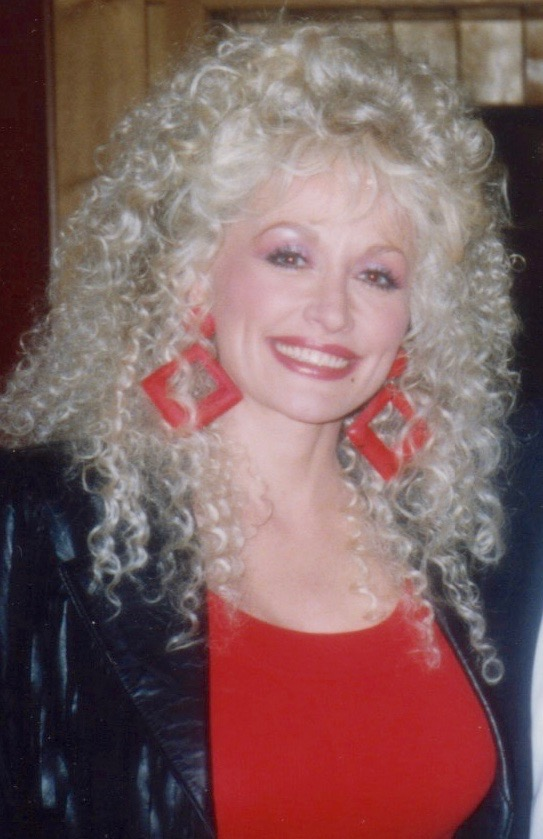
Parton at a Nashville recording session c. 1989

A duet with Ricky Van Shelton, "Rockin' Years" (1991) reached No. 1. Parton's greatest commercial fortune of the decade came when Whitney Houston recorded her popular rendition of "I Will Always Love You" for the soundtrack of The Bodyguard (1992). Both the single and the album were massively successful. Parton's own soundtrack album from the 1992 film Straight Talk was less successful. Her 1993 album, Slow Dancing with the Moon, earned positive reviews from critics and achieved strong chart success, reaching No. 4 on the Billboard Top Country Albums chart and No. 16 on the Billboard 200. It was later certified platinum.

In 1993, she recorded "The Day I Fall in Love" as a duet with James Ingram for the feature film Beethoven's 2nd. Songwriters Ingram, Carole Bayer Sager, and Clif Magness were nominated for an Academy Award for Best Original Song, and Parton and Ingram performed it at the telecast. Like her previous collaborative album with Harris and Ronstadt, Parton released Honky Tonk Angels in the fall of 1993 with Loretta Lynn and Tammy Wynette. The album was certified gold by the Recording Industry Association of America and helped to revive both Wynette and Lynn's careers. Also in 1994, Parton contributed "You Gotta Be My Baby" to the AIDS benefit album Red Hot + Country produced by the Red Hot Organization. A live acoustic album, Heartsongs: Live from Home, featuring stripped-down versions of her hits and traditional songs, was released later that year.

Parton's recorded music during the mid-to-late 1990s remained steady and eclectic. Her 1995 re-recording of "I Will Always Love You", performed as a duet with Vince Gill from her album Something Special, won the Country Music Association's Vocal Event of the Year Award. In 1996, she released Treasures, an album of covers of 1960s and 1970s hits, featuring material by Mac Davis, Pete Seeger, Kris Kristofferson, Cat Stevens, and Neil Young. Her recording of Stevens' "Peace Train" was later remixed and released as a dance single, reaching Billboard's dance singles chart.

Her 1998 country-rock album Hungry Again consisted entirely of her own compositions. Although neither of its singles, "(Why Don't More Women Sing) Honky Tonk Songs" and "Salt in My Tears", charted, videos for both songs received significant airplay on CMT. A second collaboration with Harris and Ronstadt, Trio II, was released in early 1999. Its cover of Neil Young's "After the Gold Rush" won a Grammy Award for Best Country Collaboration with Vocals. Parton was inducted into the Country Music Hall of Fame in 1999.

Parton recorded a series of bluegrass-inspired albums beginning with The Grass Is Blue (1999), which won the Grammy Award for Best Bluegrass Album, and Little Sparrow (2001), whose cover of Collective Soul's "Shine" won the Grammy Award for Best Female Country Vocal Performance. The third, Halos & Horns (2002), included a bluegrass version Led Zeppelin's "Stairway to Heaven". In 2005, she released Those Were The Days, consisting of her interpretations of folk-rock hits from the late 1960s and early 1970s, including "Imagine", "Where Do the Children Play?", "Crimson and Clover", and "Where Have All the Flowers Gone?"

=== 2005–2020: Touring and holiday album ===
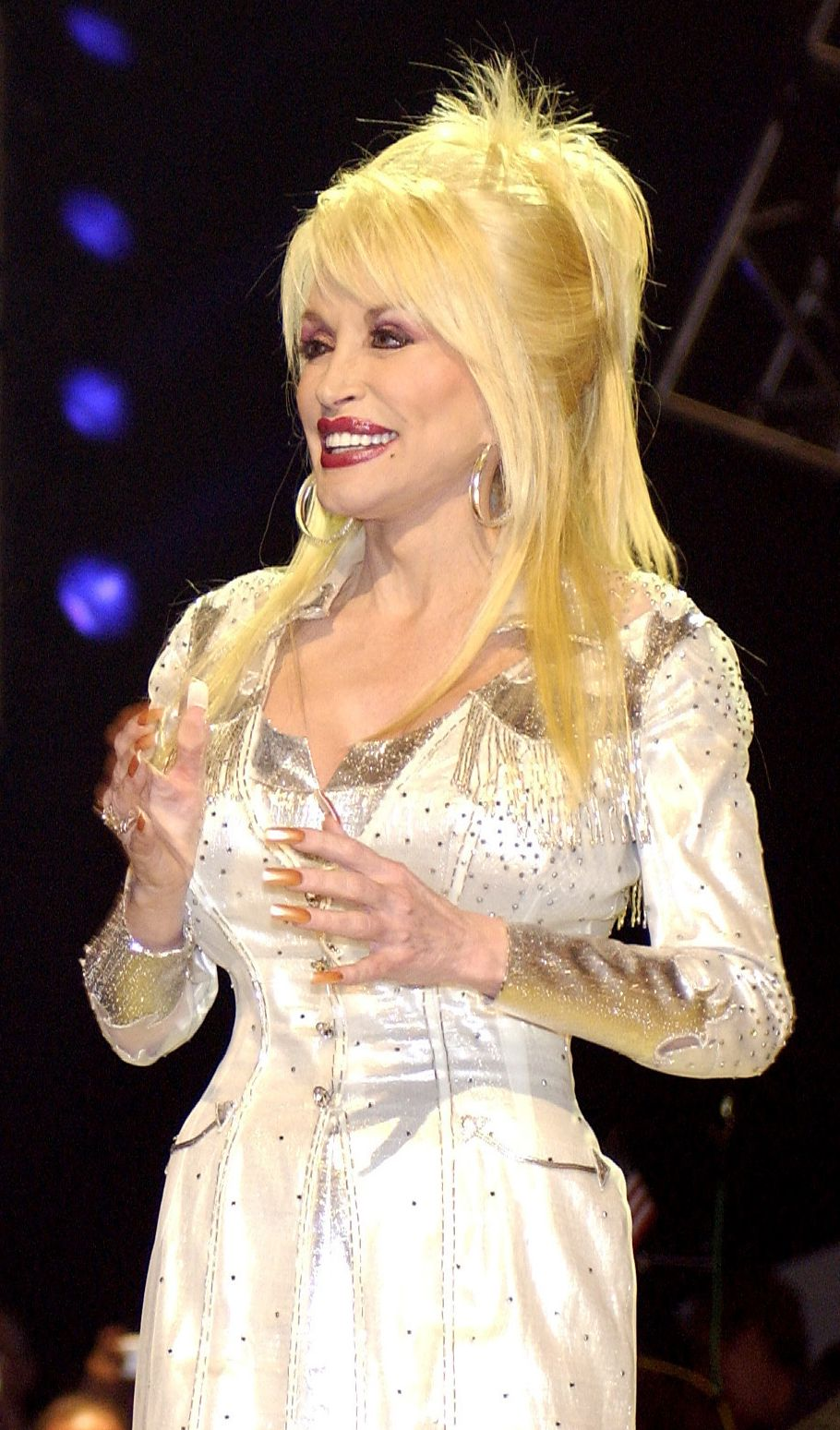
Parton at the Grand Ole Opry in 2005

Parton earned her second Academy Award nomination for Best Original Song for "Travelin' Thru", which she wrote for the feature film Transamerica (2005). The song and film centered on a transgender woman and Parton received death threats. She returned to No. 1 on the country chart later in 2005 by lending her harmonies to Brad Paisley's ballad, "When I Get Where I'm Going". In September 2007, she released her first single on her own label, Dolly Records, "Better Get to Livin'", which peaked at No. 48 on Billboard's Hot Country Songs chart.

"Better Get to Livin'" was followed by the studio album Backwoods Barbie, released on February 26, 2008, which reached No. 2 on the country chart. Its debut at No. 17 on the all-genre Billboard 200 albums chart was the highest in her career. The album produced four additional singles, including the title track, written as part of her score for 9 to 5: The Musical. After the death of Michael Jackson, whom Parton knew personally, she released a video expressing her feelings about him and his death.

On October 27, 2009, Parton released a four-CD box set, Dolly, featuring 99 songs spanning most of her career. She released her second live DVD and album, Live From London, in October 2009, filmed during her sold-out 2008 concerts at London's The O2 Arena. On August 10, 2010, Parton's longtime friend Billy Ray Cyrus released the album Brother Clyde. Parton was featured on the track "The Right Time", which she co-wrote with Cyrus and Morris Joseph Tancredi. On January 6, 2011, Parton announced her new album Better Day. In February 2011, she announced the Better Day World Tour, beginning July 17, 2011, with shows in northern Europe and the US. The album's lead-off single, "Together You and I", was released on May 23, 2011, and Better Day followed on June 28, 2011.

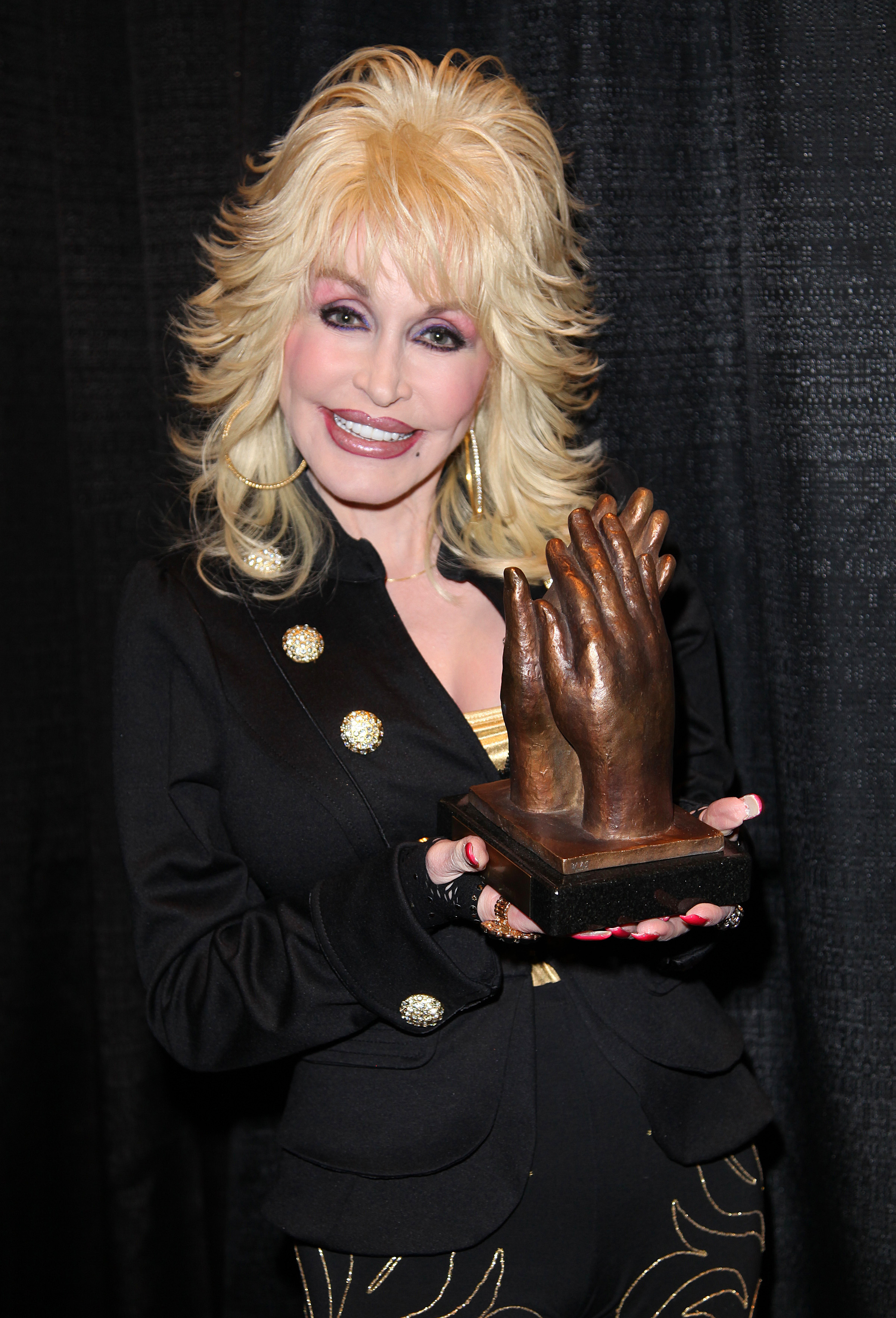
Parton receiving the Liseberg Applause Award 2010

In 2011, Parton voiced Dolly Gnome in the animated film Gnomeo & Juliet. On February 11, 2012, after the sudden death of Whitney Houston, Parton stated, "Mine is only one of the millions of hearts broken over the death of Whitney Houston. I will always be grateful and in awe of the wonderful performance she did on my song and I can truly say from the bottom of my heart, 'Whitney, I will always love you. You will be missed.'"

In 2013, Parton joined Lulu Roman for a re-recording of "I Will Always Love You" for Roman's album, At Last. In 2013, Parton and Kenny Rogers reunited for the title song of his album You Can't Make Old Friends. For their performance, they were nominated at the 2014 Grammy Awards for Grammy Award for Best Country Duo/Group Performance. In 2014, Parton embarked on the Blue Smoke World Tour in support of her 42nd studio album, Blue Smoke. The album was first released in Australia and New Zealand on January 31 to coincide with tour dates there in February and reached No. 1 on album charts in both countries.

It was released in the United States on May 13 and debuted at No. 6 on the Billboard 200 chart, making it her first Top 10 album and her highest-charting solo album ever; it also reached No. 2 on the US country chart. The album was released in Europe on June 9 and reached No. 2 on the UK album chart. On June 29, 2014, Parton performed for the first time at the UK Glastonbury Festival, singing songs such as "Jolene", "9 to 5" and "Coat of Many Colors" to a crowd of more than 180,000. On March 6, 2016, Parton announced that she would be embarking on a tour in support of her new album, Pure & Simple. The tour was one of Parton's biggest tours within the United States in more than 25 years. 64 dates were planned in the United States and Canada, visiting the most requested markets missed on previous tours.

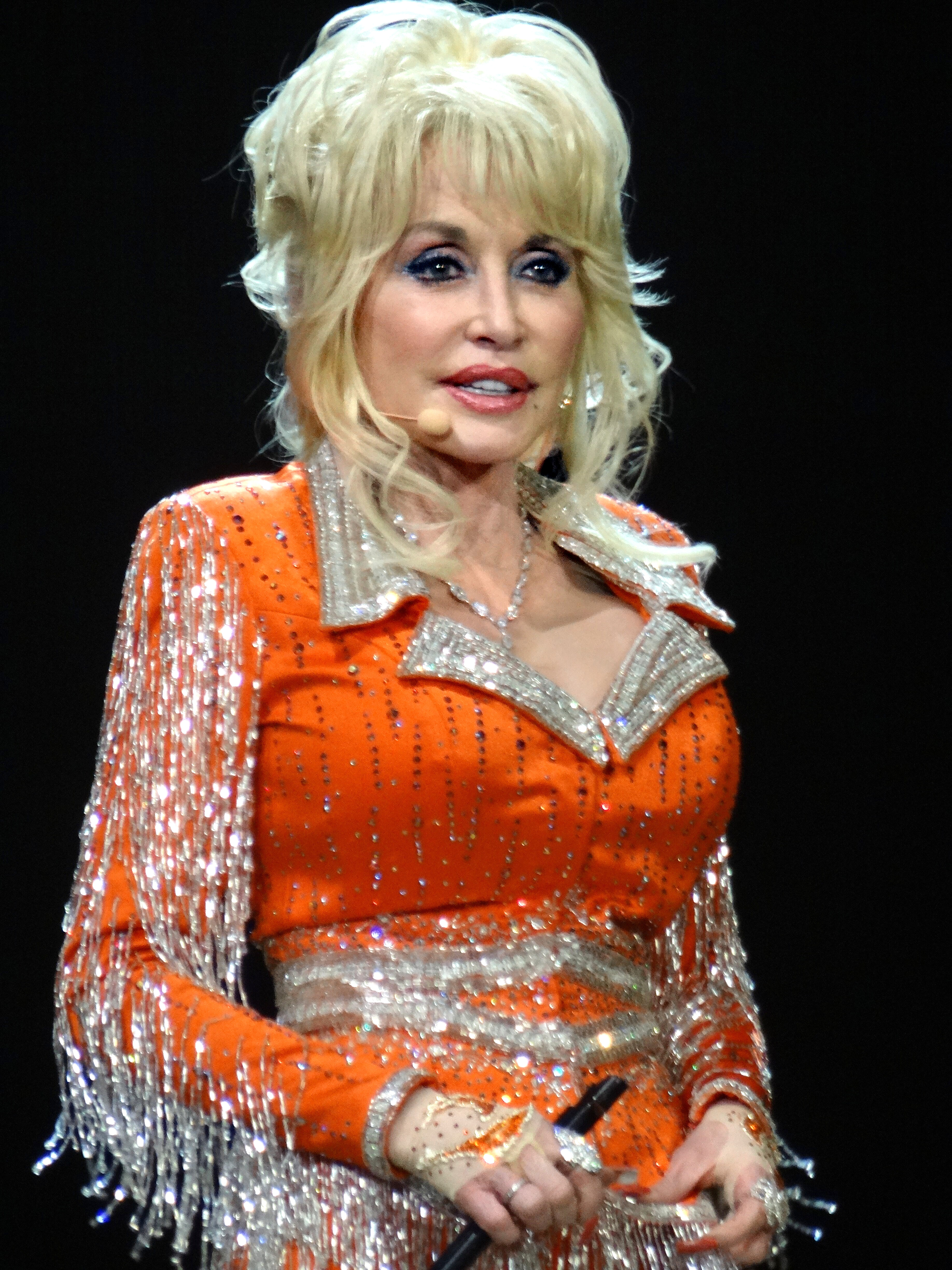
Parton at the Blue Smoke World Tour in Knoxville, 2014

In the fall of 2016, she released "Jolene" as a single with the a cappella group Pentatonix and performed on The Voice with Pentatonix and Miley Cyrus in November 2016. Also in 2016, Parton was one of thirty artists to perform on "Forever Country": a mashup of "Take Me Home, Country Roads", "On the Road Again" and her own "I Will Always Love You". The song celebrates fifty years of the CMA Awards. At the ceremony itself, Parton was honored with the Willie Nelson Lifetime Achievement Award, which was presented by Lily Tomlin and preceded by a tribute featuring Jennifer Nettles, Pentatonix, Reba McEntire, Kacey Musgraves, Carrie Underwood and Martina McBride.

In 2017, Parton appeared on Rainbow, the third studio album by Kesha performing a duet of "Old Flames Can't Hold a Candle to You". The track had been co-written by Kesha's mother Pebe Sebert. It was previously a hit for Parton and was included on her 1980 album Dolly, Dolly, Dolly. She also co-wrote and provided featuring vocals for "Rainbowland" on Younger Now, the sixth album by her goddaughter Miley Cyrus.

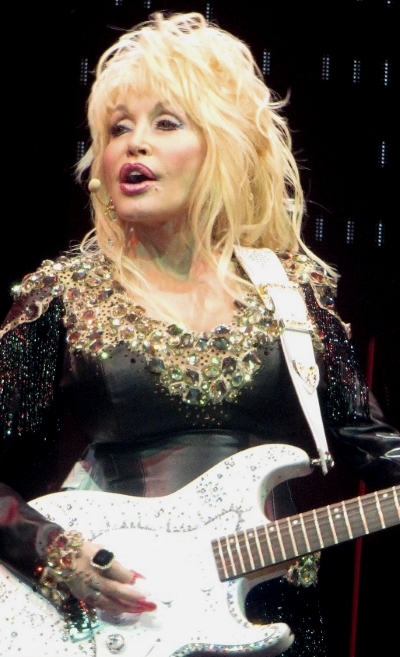
Parton performing at the Lanxess Arena in Cologne, 2014

In July 2019, Parton made an unannounced appearance at the Newport Folk Festival in Rhode Island and performed several songs accompanied by the Highwomen and Linda Perry. In 2019, Parton collaborated with Christian alternative rock duet For King and Country and released a version of their hit "God Only Knows". She followed this by recording a duet with Christian music artist Zach Williams in "There Was Jesus". In 2020, Parton received worldwide attention after posting four pictures, in which she showed how she would present herself on social media platforms LinkedIn, Facebook, Instagram and Twitter. The original post on Instagram went viral after celebrities posted their own versions of the so-called Dolly Parton challenge on social media.

On April 10, 2020, Parton re-released 93 songs from six of her classic albums: Little Sparrow, Halos & Horns, For God and Country, Better Day, Those Were The Days and Live and Well. On May 27, 2020, Parton released "When Life Is Good Again" to lift the spirits of those affected by the COVID-19 pandemic. She also released a music video for the song, which premiered on Time 100 talks on May 28, 2020.

In October 2020, Parton was featured on the single "Pink" alongside Monica, Jordin Sparks, Sara Evans and Rita Wilson. The single was released in aid of Breast Cancer Research. Parton released A Holly Dolly Christmas in October 2020. On December 6, CBS aired a Christmas special, A Holly Dolly Christmas, where Parton performed songs from her album.

=== 2021–2026: Rockstar and Las Vegas residency ===
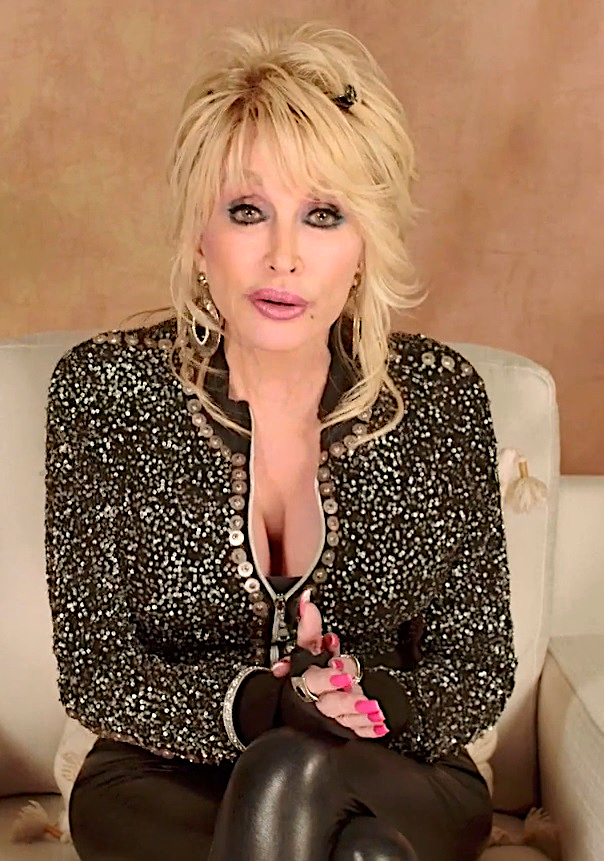
Parton in 2022

In 2021, a duet version of "Does He Love You" with singer Reba McEntire was released. In early 2022, Parton was nominated for induction into the Rock and Roll Hall of Fame. Parton initially declined the nomination, believing that the Rock and Roll Hall of Fame was "for the people in rock music", but after learning that this was not the case, Parton said she would accept her induction if she were chosen for the honor. In May, her induction was announced and on November 5, 2022, she was inducted into the Rock and Roll Hall of Fame. In October 2022, Parton stated in an interview that she would no longer tour, but would continue to play live shows occasionally. On December 31, 2022, Parton co-hosted NBC's New Year's special Miley's New Year's Eve Party.

On January 17, 2023, Parton announced that she would release her first rock album, titled Rockstar, later that year, during an interview on The View. The lead single "World on Fire" was released on May 11, 2023, and it peaked at No. 1 a week later. The album was released on November 17, 2023, and featured collaborations with Paul McCartney, Ringo Starr, Sting, Elton John, Stevie Nicks, Sheryl Crow, Steve Perry, Miley Cyrus and Lizzo, among others. The album received generally positive reviews from critics and debuted at No. 3 on the Billboard 200, becoming Parton's highest-charting solo studio album as well as topping the Country and Rock Albums charts.

On January 20, 2023, the soundtrack single "Gonna Be You" from the movie 80 for Brady was released. The song was written by Diane Warren and performed by Dolly Parton, Belinda Carlisle, Cyndi Lauper, Debbie Harry and Gloria Estefan. The official music video showed Parton, Carlisle, Lauper and Estefan performing while wearing football jerseys similar to the ones worn by the women in the film, interspersed with clips from the film.

On March 29, 2024, Parton was featured on Beyoncé's eighth studio album Cowboy Carter, being involved in the introduction to the reinterpretation of "Jolene" by her colleague, in which Parton associated the character of "Jolene" with "Becky" from the track "Sorry" on Beyoncé's album Lemonade, and as a featured artist on the track "Tyrant". Parton offered to collaborate on the recording of what became her last known duet with Belles on the new music track "Son of Jolene".

Parton performing "Peace Like a River" with Dionne Warwick (2023)

On February 14, 2025, Parton featured on Sabrina Carpenter's "Please Please Please" on the deluxe edition of her album Short n' Sweet and its accompanying music video. On March 7, 2025, Parton released the single "If You Hadn't Been There", as a tribute to her husband, who had died a week before. In the United Kingdom, the single peaked at No. 21 on the sales and downloads chart components. In 2025, Dolly Parton recorded a new version of the 1985 single "Home Sweet Home" with Mötley Crüe, marking the song's 40th anniversary. The track was released on the band's compilation From The Beginning, with a portion of proceeds benefiting Covenant House, a charity supporting homeless youth. The collaboration returned a favor Parton had extended two years earlier, when she invited Mötley Crüe's Nikki Sixx and John 5 to contribute to her 2023 rock album Rockstar. Parton planned to begin a six-date Las Vegas residency, Dolly: Live in Las Vegas, at Caesars Palace in December 2025, but she postponed and then canceled it.

On January 16, 2026, in anticipation of her 80th birthday, Parton released a rendition of "Light of a Clear Blue Morning" featuring several celebrity guests: Queen Latifah, Lainey Wilson, Miley Cyrus, Reba McEntire, and David Foster. On March 13, 2026, Parton made her first major appearance since the health scare to give the keynote address at Dollywood during the 41st anniversary celebration.

Parton made her last public appearance in June 2026, appearing at the grand opening of a truck stop off Interstate 65 in Cornersville, Tennessee that was being named in her honor. On August 14, just eleven days before her death, she was set to attend the grand opening of a new ride at Dollywood. Instead, she appeared in a recorded video from her home in Nashville to explain that because of health issues she could not appear in person.

A new song titled "Jolene - Welsh Version" was released on October 9, 2026, with parts being sung in Welsh by Dolly in recognition of her ancestry.

== Acting career ==
=== Breakthrough ===
In addition to her performing appearances on The Porter Wagoner Show in the 1960s and into the 1970s, her two self-titled television variety shows in the Dolly! and Dolly and on American Idol in 2008 and other guest appearances, Parton also had television roles. In 1979, she received an Emmy award nomination as "Outstanding Supporting Actress in a Variety Program" for her guest appearance in a Cher special. During the mid-1970s Parton wanted to expand her audience base. Her first attempt, the television variety show Dolly! (1976–1977), had high ratings but lasted only one season. Parton requested to be released from her contract because of the stress it was causing on her vocal cords. She later debuted a second television variety show, also titled Dolly (1987–1988). The series was canceled after only one season because of low ratings.

In her first feature film, Parton portrayed a secretary in a leading role with Jane Fonda and Lily Tomlin in the comedy film 9 to 5 (1980). The movie highlighted discrimination against women in the workplace and created awareness of the National Association of Working Women (9–5). She received nominations for a Golden Globe Award for Best Actress – Musical or Comedy and a Golden Globe Award for New Star of the Year – Actress. Parton wrote and recorded the film's title song. It received nominations for an Academy Award for Best Song and a Golden Globe Award for Best Original Song.

Released as a single, the song won both the Grammy Award for Best Female Country Vocal Performance and the Grammy Award for Best Country Song. It also reached No. 1 on the Hot 100 chart and it was No. 78 on the "AFI's 100 Years...100 Songs" list released by the American Film Institute in 2004. 9 to 5 became a major box office success, grossing over $3.9 million its opening weekend and over $103 million worldwide. Parton was named Top Female Box Office Star by the Motion Picture Herald in both 1981 and 1982 due to the film's success.

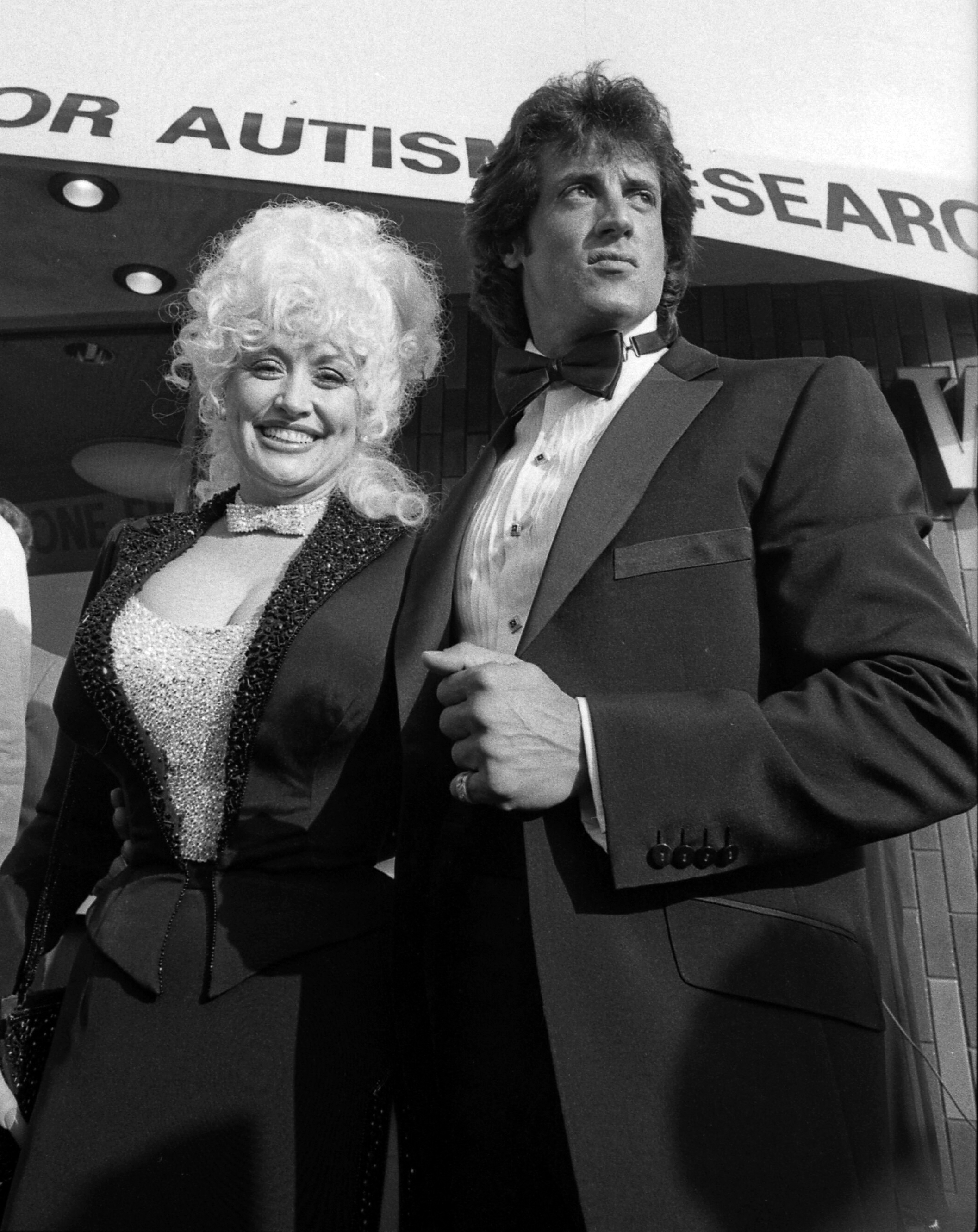
Parton with Sylvester Stallone promoting Rhinestone in 1984

In late 1981, Parton began work on her second film, the musical film The Best Little Whorehouse in Texas (1982). The film earned her a second nomination for a Golden Globe Award for Best Actress – Motion Picture Musical or Comedy. It was greeted with positive critical reviews and became a commercial success, earning over $69 million worldwide. After a two-year hiatus from films, Parton was teamed with Sylvester Stallone for Rhinestone (1984), a comedy film about a country music star's efforts to mold an unknown into a music sensation. The film was a critical and financial failure, making just over $21 million on a $28 million budget.

=== Continued roles ===
In 1989, Parton returned to film acting in Steel Magnolias, based on the play of the same name by Robert Harling. The film was popular with critics and audiences, grossing over $95 million in the US. Parton starred in the television movies A Smoky Mountain Christmas (1986), Wild Texas Wind (1991), Unlikely Angel (1996), portraying an angel sent back to earth after a deadly car crash and Blue Valley Songbird (1999), where her character lives through her music. She starred with James Woods in Straight Talk (1992), which received mixed reviews and grossed a mild $21 million at the box office.

Parton's 1987 variety show, Dolly, lasted only one season. She made a cameo appearance as herself in The Beverly Hillbillies (1993), an adaptation of the TV sitcom The Beverly Hillbillies (1962–1971). Parton also did voice work for animated television series, playing the character Katrina Eloise "Murph" Murphy (Ms. Frizzle's first cousin) in a 1994 episode of The Magic School Bus ("The Family Holiday Special").

She guest-starred in several sitcoms, including a 1990 episode of Designing Women ("The First Day of the Last Decade of the Entire Twentieth Century") as herself, the guardian movie star of Charlene's baby. She made a guest appearance on Reba ("Reba's Rules of Real Estate") portraying a real-estate agency owner and on The Simpsons ("Sunday, Cruddy Sunday" in 1999).

She appeared as herself in 2000 on the Halloween episode of Bette Midler's short-lived sitcom Bette and on episode 14 of Babes, produced by Sandollar Productions, Parton and Sandy Gallin's joint production company. She made cameo appearances on the Disney Channel as "Aunt Dolly", visiting Hannah and her family in fellow Tennessean and real-life Miley Cyrus's series Hannah Montana ("Good Golly, Miss Dolly" in 2006, "I Will Always Loathe You" in 2007 and "Kiss It All Goodbye" in 2010). Parton was Cyrus's godmother.

Parton appeared as an overprotective mother in the comedy Frank McKlusky, C.I.. (2002) She made a cameo appearance in the comedy film Miss Congeniality 2: Armed and Fabulous (2005), starring Sandra Bullock. She was featured in The Book Lady (2008), a documentary about her campaign for children's literacy. Parton expected to reprise her television role as Hannah's godmother in the musical comedy film Hannah Montana: The Movie (2009), but the character was omitted from the screenplay.

=== Final works ===
Parton had a voice role in the comedy family film Gnomeo & Juliet (2011), an animated film with garden gnomes about William Shakespeare's Romeo and Juliet. She co-starred with Queen Latifah in the musical film Joyful Noise (2012), playing a choir director's widow who joins forces with Latifah's character, a mother of two teens, to save a small Georgia town's gospel choir. Dolly Parton's Coat of Many Colors, a made-for-TV film based on "Coat of Many Colors" and featuring narration by Parton, aired on NBC in December 2015, with child actress Alyvia Alyn Lind portraying the young Parton. Parton also had a cameo in the sequel, which aired in November 2016.

In June 2018, Parton announced an eight-part Netflix series featuring her music career. She was its executive producer and co-star. The series, called Dolly Parton's Heartstrings, aired in November 2019. Parton was the subject of the NPR podcast Dolly Parton's America, hosted by Jad Abumrad and produced and reported by Shima Oliaee. In December 2019, the biographical documentary Here I Am was added to the catalog of the Netflix streaming service. The documentary, a co-production of Netflix and the BBC, takes its name from Parton's 1971 song.

In November 2020, Parton produced and starred in the Netflix musical film Dolly Parton's Christmas on the Square, which won her a Primetime Emmy Award for Outstanding Television Movie. In November 2021, Parton was confirmed to be appearing in the final season of Grace and Frankie in a guest-starring role, reuniting with her 9 to 5 co-stars Lily Tomlin and Jane Fonda. In July 2022, Parton appeared as a simulation of herself on the sci-fi show The Orville ("Midnight Blue"). In December 2022, Parton appeared in an NBC special titled Dolly Parton's Mountain Magic Christmas. On Thanksgiving 2023, Parton performed songs during halftime at the Washington Commanders and Dallas Cowboys NFL football game.

== Other ventures ==
In 1998, Nashville Business ranked her the wealthiest country music star. As of 2017, her net worth was estimated at $500 million.

=== Writing ===
Parton was a prolific songwriter, writing country music songs with strong elements of folk music and her upbringing in humble mountain surroundings, as well as reflecting her family's Christian background. Her songs "Coat of Many Colors", "I Will Always Love You" and "Jolene", among others, became classics. On November 4, 2003, Parton was honored as a BMI Icon at the 2003 BMI Country Awards. Parton earned more than 35 BMI Pop and Country Awards. In 2001, she was inducted into the Songwriters Hall of Fame. In a 2009 interview on CNN's Larry King Live, she said she had written "at least three thousand" songs, writing something – be it a song or an idea – every day since she was seven.

Parton's songwriting was featured prominently in several films. In addition to the title song for 9 to 5, she also recorded a second version of "I Will Always Love You" for The Best Little Whorehouse in Texas (1982). The second version was a No. 1 country hit and also reached No. 53 on the pop charts. "I Will Always Love You" has been covered by many country artists, including Linda Ronstadt on Prisoner In Disguise (1975), Kenny Rogers on Vote for Love (1996) and LeAnn Rimes on Unchained Melody: The Early Years (1997). Whitney Houston's version, which was performed on The Bodyguard soundtrack, became a best-selling hit both written and performed by a female vocalist, with worldwide sales of more than twelve million copies. The song has been translated into Italian and performed by the Welsh opera singer Katherine Jenkins.

As a songwriter, Parton was twice nominated for an Academy Award for Best Original Song for "9 to 5" and "Travelin' Thru" (2005) from the film Transamerica. "Travelin' Thru" won Best Original Song at the 2005 Phoenix Film Critics Society Awards. It was also nominated for both the 2005 Golden Globe Award for Best Original Song and the 2005 Broadcast Film Critics Association Award (also known as the Critics' Choice Awards) for Best Song. A cover of "Love Is Like A Butterfly" by Clare Torry was used as the theme music for the British TV show Butterflies. Parton collaborated with her youngest sister Rachel on the cookbook Good Lookin' Cookin', which featured Parton family recipes and was released in 2024.

=== Stage musicals ===
==== 9 to 5: The Musical ====
Parton wrote the score (and Patricia Resnick the book) for 9 to 5: The Musical, a musical-theater adaptation of Parton's feature film 9 to 5 (1980). The musical ran at the Ahmanson Theatre, Los Angeles, in late 2008. It opened on Broadway at the Marquis Theatre in New York on April 30, 2009, to mixed reviews. The title track of her 2008 album Backwoods Barbie was written for the musical's character Doralee. Although her score (as well as the musical debut of actress Allison Janney) was praised, the show struggled, closing on September 6, 2009, after 24 previews and 148 performances.

Parton received nominations for the Drama Desk Award for Outstanding Music and Drama Desk Award for Outstanding Lyrics and a nomination for Tony Award for Best Original Score. Developing the musical was not a quick process. According to the public-radio program Studio 360 (October 29, 2005), in October 2005 Parton was in the midst of composing songs for a Broadway musical theater adaptation of the film. In late June 2007, 9 to 5: The Musical was read for industry presentations. The readings starred Megan Hilty, Allison Janney, Stephanie J. Block, Bebe Neuwirth and Marc Kudisch. Ambassador Theatre Group announced a 2012 UK tour for Dolly Parton's 9 to 5: The Musical, commencing at Manchester Opera House, on October 12, 2012.

==== Dolly: A True Original Musical ====
In June 2024, Parton announced an autobiographical musical about her life and career initially titled Hello, I'm Dolly (named after her debut album and also a play on Hello, Dolly!), with a goal of opening on Broadway in 2026 with direction by Bartlett Sher. The musical, with a co-written book by Parton and Maria S. Schlatter, features original songs as well as her more well-known hits. Parton also revealed that she had been working on the musical for the past decade. The title was promoted as Dolly: An Original Musical on December 6, coinciding with a nationwide casting call for actresses to play Parton through different stages of her life, using the hashtag #SearchForDolly on social media video posts. The show opened as Dolly: A True Original Musical at the Belmont University Fisher Center for the Performing Arts in Nashville in July 2025.

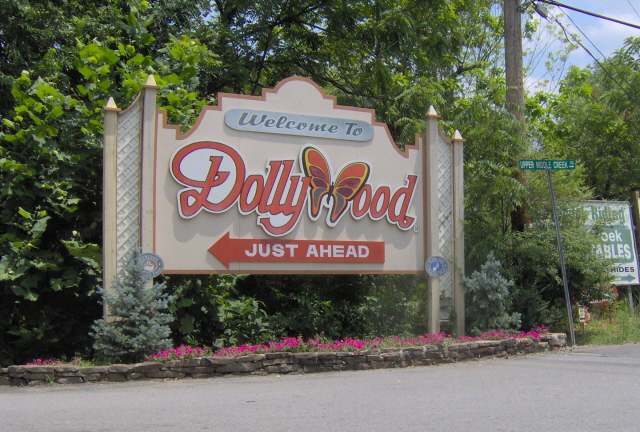
The entrance to Dollywood in Pigeon Forge

Parton invested much of her earnings into business ventures in her native East Tennessee, including Pigeon Forge. She was a co-owner of The Dollywood Company, which operates the theme park (a former Silver Dollar City), a dinner theater, Dolly Parton's Stampede, the waterpark Dollywood's Splash Country and the Dream More Resort and Spa, all in Pigeon Forge. With 3.1 million visitors in 2024, Dollywood is among the twenty most popular theme parks in the United States, and the fifth most popular theme park that operates seasonally.

The Dolly Parton's Stampede business has venues in Branson, Missouri and Myrtle Beach, South Carolina. In 2011, the Myrtle Beach Stampede location was redesigned under the name Pirates Voyage, and the show later expanded to Tennessee and Florida locations. A former location in Orlando, Florida, closed in January 2008 after the land and building were sold to a developer.

On January 19, 2012, coinciding with Dolly Parton's 66th birthday, Gaylord Opryland and Dollywood announced a 50/50 joint venture to develop a 114-acre family entertainment zone in Nashville, featuring a $50 million combination water and snow park as its first phase. In September 2012, Parton officially withdrew her support for the Nashville park because of the restructuring of Gaylord Entertainment Company after its merger with Marriott International. In June 2015, the Dollywood Company purchased the Lumberjack Feud Dinner Show in Pigeon Forge. The show, which opened in June 2011, was owned and operated by Rob Scheer until the close of the 2015 season. The new, renovated show by the Dollywood Company opened in 2016.

=== Business ventures ===
Beginning in 2022, Parton partnered with Duncan Hines, a brand of Conagra Brands, to launch a line of Southern-inspired cake mixes and frostings; a limited-edition collection sold out online upon its release, with the products subsequently distributed to retailers nationwide. The line expanded in 2023 to include brownie, cornbread and biscuit mixes, and in January 2024 Parton entered an exclusive licensing agreement with Conagra to develop products across additional food categories, including frozen, refrigerated, grocery and snack foods. Parton also expanded into kitchen and housewares through licensing agreements with Lifetime Brands and Lodge, including cookware, bakeware, tabletop goods and kitchen tools; an approximately 50-item collection developed for Dollar General debuted nationwide in 2024.

In October 2025, Parton announced she would open her SongTeller Hotel in downtown Nashville in partnership with the firm Herschend. With the hotel, Parton would also be opening her new Dolly's Life of Many Colors Museum, which claimed to be "the largest exhibit celebrating her life anywhere to date". Advance tickets for the museum's opening in June 2026 went on sale on October 29, 2025. On May 26, 2026, it was announced that Dolly's Tennessean Travel Stop would open on June 24, 2026. The travel stop "will include a general store, a full-service sit-down cafe and restaurant offering DLY BBQ, as well as Dolly's Cup of Ambition Coffee". It is located at exit 22 off I‑65 in Cornersville, Tennessee, about an hour south of Nashville.

=== Production work ===
Parton was a co-owner of Sandollar Productions, launched in 1986 with Sandy Gallin, her former manager. A film and television production company, its first production was A Smoky Mountain Christmas (1986) starring Parton. It produced the documentary Common Threads: Stories from the Quilt (1989), which won an Academy Award for Best Documentary Feature; the television series Babes (1990–1991), Buffy the Vampire Slayer (1997–2003), and Angel (1999–2004); and the feature films Father of the Bride (1991), Father of the Bride: Part II (1995) Straight Talk (1992) (in which Parton starred) and Sabrina (1995), among other shows. In a 2009 interview, singer Connie Francis said that Parton had been contacting her for years in an attempt to film her life story. Francis turned down Parton's offers, as she was already in negotiations with singer Gloria Estefan to produce the film, a collaboration that had ended. After the retirement of Sandy Gallin, Parton briefly operated Dolly Parton's Southern Light Productions. In 2015, she announced that her new production company, Dixie-Pixie Productions, would produce the movies-of-week in development with NBC Television and Magnolia Hill Productions. They also produced Dolly Parton's Heartstrings (2019) for Netflix.

== Artistry ==
=== Influences ===
Parton, though influenced by big-name stars, often credited much of her inspiration to her family and community. In her 2020 book, Songteller: My Life in Lyrics, Parton wrote: "So it was just natural for my mom to always be singing. [She] had that old-timey voice and she used to sing all these songs that were brought over from the Old World. They were English, Irish, Welsh, folk songs where people tell stories." Parton calls her mother's voice "haunting". "Lord you would feel it," she wrote.

Her biggest influence was her aunt: "People often ask me who my influences were, they think I'm going to say some big names and there were a few 'stars' I was impressed with. But my hero was my Aunt Dorothy Jo, Mama's baby sister. She was not only an evangelist, she played banjo, she played guitar and she wrote some great songs." Fellow singers also had an impact on Parton; she described George Jones as her "all-time favorite singer", as well as mentioning her love for other artists such as Kitty Wells, Roy Acuff and Rose Maddox.

=== Musicianship ===
Though unable to read sheet music, Parton was raised in a family that enjoyed making music, including at church. She learned how to write songs and play many instruments, including the dulcimer, autoharp, banjo, guitar, electric guitar, fiddle, piano, recorder and saxophone. Reflecting on her abilities Parton said, "I play some of everything. I ain't that good at none of it, but I try to sell it. I really try to lay into it." Parton also used her acrylic fingernails as an instrument, most evident in "9 to 5", where she derived the beat from clacking her nails together while backstage on the set of the film 9 to 5.

== Philanthropy and advocacy ==
=== Education and literacy ===
In 1988, Parton founded the non-profit Dollywood Foundation, originally to improve educational outcomes among children in her home county of Sevier County, Tennessee. Among the foundation's early efforts was the Buddy Program, in which seventh- and eighth-grade students paired with a friend and pledged to support each other in remaining in school and graduating from high school. Students who graduated received $500. The dropout rate among participating classes fell from 35% to 6%, and the program encouraged the community to develop additional initiatives to sustain the improvement.

Parton's literacy program, Dolly Parton's Imagination Library, is also a part of the Dollywood Foundation, and it was founded in 1995 in honor of her father, who never learned to read or write. It mails one book per month to each enrolled child from the time of their birth until they enter kindergarten. More than 1,600 local communities provide the Imagination Library to almost 850,000 children each month across the US, Canada, the UK, Australia and Ireland. In 2006, Parton published a cookbook, Dolly's Dixie Fixin's: Love, Laughter and Lots of Good Food, with all proceeds going toward the Imagination Library. On the 30th anniversary of the program, Roxanne Owens provided a summary of the impact of the initiative for Children and Libraries, the journal of the Association for Library Service to Children.

In February 2018, she donated her 100 millionth free book, a copy of Parton's children's picture book Coat of Many Colors, to the Library of Congress in Washington, D.C. and was honored by the Library on account of the charity's "sending out its 100 millionth book".

Starting on February 24, 2022, employees of Dollywood who decided to go to college would have their tuition fees, books, and other associated fees, paid for by the theme park. In October 2022, it was revealed that Parton had been paying for the band uniforms for several Tennessee high schools for numerous years.

In February 2025, Indiana governor Mike Braun declined to continue a state 50% match for Parton's Imagination Library. Dollywood Foundation President Jeff Conyers said, "We are hopeful that Governor Braun and the Indiana Legislature will continue this vital investment by restoring the state's funding match for local Imagination Library programs." Braun would soon afterwards task his wife Maureen with finding ways to keep the Imagination Library's Indiana chapter alive.

For her work in literacy, Parton received awards including the Association of American Publishers Honors Award (2000), Good Housekeeping Seal of Approval (2001), and Parents as Teachers National Center – Child and Family Advocacy Award (2003). The Chartered Institute of Library and Information Professionals awarded Parton an Honorary Fellowship in 2024.

=== Healthcare and medical research ===
The Dollywood Foundation, funded from Parton's profits, has brought jobs and tax revenues to a previously depressed region. Parton also worked to raise money for other causes, including the American Red Cross and HIV/AIDS-related charities.

In December 2006, Parton pledged $500,000 toward a proposed $90 million hospital and cancer center to be constructed in Sevierville in the name of Robert F. Thomas, the physician who delivered her. She announced a benefit concert to raise additional funds for the project. The concert played to about 8,000 people.

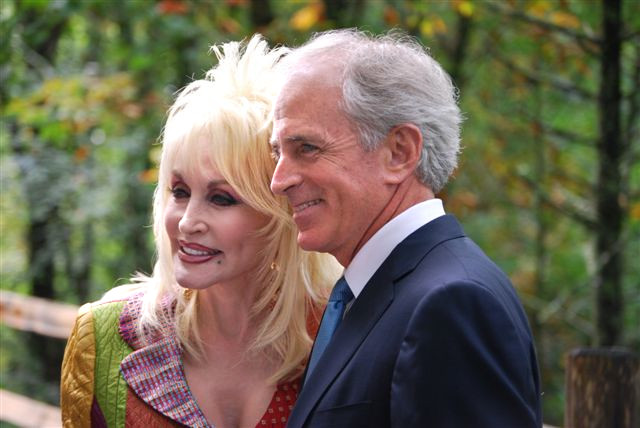
Parton with US Senator Bob Corker at the rededication ceremony for the Great Smoky Mountains National Park in September 2009

Parton was a generous donor to Vanderbilt University Medical Center (VUMC). Among her gifts was a contribution to the Monroe Carell Jr. Children's Hospital at Vanderbilt Pediatric Cancer Program in honor of a friend, Naji Abumrad and her niece, Hannah Dennison, who was successfully treated for leukemia as a child at the Children's Hospital.

Parton also made "generational and transformational" donations of undisclosed amounts to the East Tennessee Children's Hospital, according to the hospital's president and chief executive officer. The hospital was later renamed the Dolly Parton Children's Hospital.

==== Moderna COVID-19 vaccine ====
In response to the COVID-19 pandemic, Parton donated $1 million towards research at Vanderbilt University Medical Center and encouraged those who can afford it to make similar donations. She said, "I'm a very proud girl today to know I had anything at all to do with something that's going to help us through this crazy pandemic." Her donation funded the critical early stages of development of the Moderna vaccine.

In March 2021, Parton was vaccinated against COVID-19 at Vanderbilt University. She strongly encouraged everybody to get vaccinated when eligible, and labeled her social media accounts of the occasion "Dolly gets a dose of her own medicine." Parton celebrated her own vaccination by posting a video clip of herself belting out a few lines of revised lyrics set to the tune of "Jolene", starting with the word vaccine.

=== Disaster relief and community aid ===
In response to the 2016 Great Smoky Mountains wildfires, Parton was one of the country music artists who participated in a telethon to raise money for victims of the fires. This was held in Nashville on December 9. Parton hosted her own telethon for the victims on December 13 and reportedly raised around $9 million. Her fund, the "My People Fund", provided $1,000 a month for six months to more than 900 families affected by the wildfires, culminating with $5,000 to each home in the final month due to increased fundraising, totaling $10,000 per family.

In 2018, the FBI honored Parton for her wildfire aid, awarding her the 2018 Director's Community Leadership Award in a ceremony at FBI Headquarters. The honor was bestowed by Director Christopher Wray and was accepted on Parton's behalf by David Dotson, the CEO of the Dollywood Foundation.

The impact of the fund's financial relief for the 2016 wildfire victims was studied by University of Tennessee College of Social Work professor Stacia West, who examined the impact of cash transfers on poverty alleviation. West surveyed 100 recipients of the emergency relief funds in April 2017 on topics including housing, financial impact, physical and emotional health and sources of support, with a follow-up survey conducted in December 2017. West found that the "My People Fund", in tandem with traditional disaster response, gave families the ability to make decisions that were most beneficial to them and concluded that unconditional cash support may be more beneficial for disaster relief than conditional financial support. The report mentioned the impact of the monthly financial disbursements from the "My People Fund" on residents' emergency savings: "Following the monthly disbursements of unconditional cash assistance, participants were able to return to baseline financial stability reported prior to the wildfire and improve their ability to set aside savings for hypothetical future emergencies."

In the aftermath of 2024's Hurricane Helene, Parton announced a donation of $2 million to relief efforts, $1 million personally and another $1 million through her various businesses and the Dollywood Foundation.

=== Animal welfare and conservation ===
In 2003, her efforts to preserve the bald eagle through the American Eagle Foundation's sanctuary at Dollywood earned her the Partnership Award from the US Fish and Wildlife Service. In 2006, Parton and Emmylou Harris allowed use of their music in a PETA ad campaign that encouraged pet owners to keep their dogs indoors rather than chained outside.

=== LGBTQ+ advocacy ===
Though often politically neutral, Parton was known for her long history of openly supporting the gay community, and her example helped pave the way for Reba McEntire, Shania Twain, and younger country artists to do the same. Parton publicly came out in support of same-sex marriage in 2009. She also voiced her support for the trans community after a series of anti-trans measures came into law in Tennessee in 2023. The Tennessee Equality Project described her as "the outsider who made it big by being herself, and leading with love". They said the LGBTQ community "always felt that she had our back, and it mattered".

=== Recognition ===
In addition to the awards Parton received specifically for her efforts toward promoting literacy, Parton also received recognition for her general philanthropic work. On November 8, 2007, she received the Woodrow Wilson Award for Public Service from the Woodrow Wilson International Center for Scholars of the Smithsonian Institution at a ceremony in Nashville.

On May 8, 2009, Parton gave the commencement speech at the graduation ceremony for the University of Tennessee, Knoxville's College of Arts and Sciences. During the ceremony, she received an honorary Doctor of Humane Letters from the university. It was only the second honorary degree given by the university; Chancellor Jimmy Cheek said, "Because of her career not just as a musician and entertainer, but for her role as a cultural ambassador, philanthropist and lifelong advocate for education, it is fitting that she be honored with an honorary degree from the flagship educational institution of her home state." Following her death, Parton was the subject of an obituary in the prominent science journal Nature celebrating her contributions to fields such as public health and literacy, including a laudatory quotation from World Health Organization director Tedros Ghebreyesus.

== Public image and appearance ==
I patterned my look after the town tramp. Everybody said, "She's trash." And in my little girl mind I thought, "Well, that's what I'm gonna be when I grow up."

— Dolly Parton, 2022

Parton was known for her charisma, strong connections with fans, and characteristic wit. When asked by a teenager what advice she would give American teenagers, she replied, "Act like it's raining every day and wear your rubbers."

Although Parton had previously declined requests to pose nude, she appeared on the cover of the October 1978 issue of Playboy, wearing a classic bunny costume, complete with ears. The issue featured Lawrence Grobel's extensive and candid interview with Parton, representing one of her earliest high-profile interviews with the mainstream press.

The association of breasts with Parton's public image resulted in the naming of Dolly the sheep after her in 1996. This sheep was cloned from a cell taken from an adult ewe's mammary gland, with one of the scientists saying, "we couldn't think of a more impressive pair of glands". In Mobile, Alabama, the General W.K. Wilson Jr. Bridge is commonly called "the Dolly Parton Bridge" due to its arches resembling her bust. The thickened appearance of the turret frontal armor of the T-72A main battle tank led to the unofficial Army nickname "Dolly Parton" and later the T-72BIs got the "Super Dolly Parton" nickname.

Parton was known for having undergone considerable plastic surgery. On a 2003 episode of The Oprah Winfrey Show, Winfrey asked what kind of cosmetic surgery Parton had undergone. Parton replied that cosmetic surgery was imperative in keeping with her famous image. Parton repeatedly joked about her physical image and surgeries saying, "It takes a lot of money to look this cheap." When asked about future plastic surgeries she said, "If I see something sagging, bagging or dragging, I'll get it nipped, tucked or sucked."

Parton's feminine escapism from the harsh rural working conditions of her childhood was acknowledged in her words, "Womanhood was a difficult thing to get a grip on in those hills, unless you were a man." Parton joked in 2012 that she had entered a "Dolly Parton drag queen look-alike contest" and lost.

== Personal life ==
=== Faith ===
Parton grew up attending her grandfather's Pentecostal church. She remarked in the 2022 television special Dolly Parton's Mountain Magic Christmas that religion had been "crammed [...] down her throat" when she was a child and that she did not want to portray her faith in such a manner. Parton said in 2018 that she believed in God, that he "helps" and "guides" her, and that she "talk[s] to Him every day". She said that her faith is "very important", that she believes "Jesus loves [her]", and that she is "never ashamed of [her] religion". She said she is "not trying to cram it down anyone else's throat", but that she "just think[s] that everybody's got to have something to believe in". In an interview with the New Humanist magazine in 2024, she said that "whether you believe in God or not, whether you call it Mother Nature or Father Time or a higher wisdom. You need to believe in yourself and you need to believe there's a force that can push you and lead you on", and added "I'm not a religious fanatic. I wouldn't even say I'm religious, though I grew up with that background." Separately, Parton also referred to herself as a "person of faith", and "a very spiritual person". She also said that she regularly read the Bible.

In a 2020 interview with the Marie Claire magazine, Parton said: "... Every single day, before I do anything, I wake up and I thank God for the night and ask Him to bless the day and to bring all the right things ... all the wrong people out of my life, and bring all the right stuff in. And just to guide me, lead me. And I always pray that He'll let me uplift Mankind and glorify Him."

=== Marriage ===
Parton arrived in Nashville on a Saturday morning in 1964, the day after graduating from Sevier County High School. After starting her laundry inside the Wishy Washy Laundromat, she got a cold drink and stepped outside. Carl Thomas Dean (1942–2025), a Nashville native, pulled up along the sidewalk where she was standing. He mentioned she might get sunburned because of the style of shirt she was wearing. Following that interaction, they began a conversation. They were married in Ringgold, Georgia, on May 30, 1966. Although Parton did not use Dean's surname professionally, it was used in her personal life. Her passport read "Dolly Parton Dean" and she sometimes used Dean when signing contracts.

Dean ran an asphalt road and driveway-paving business in Nashville that he inherited from his father. He always shunned publicity and rarely accompanied his wife to public events. According to Parton, he saw her perform only once. She also said in interviews that even though it appeared they spent little time together, it was because nobody saw him publicly. Dean often visited Dollywood unrecognized. Parton commented on Dean's romantic side, saying that he did spontaneous things to surprise her and sometimes wrote poems for her. In 2011 she said they were "... really very proud of our marriage. It's the first for both of us. And the last." The couple renewed their vows in honor of their 50th wedding anniversary in May 2016.

Parton and Dean moved into their long-term home on 75 acres in Brentwood, Tennessee, in 1972. They kept ownership of their prior home in Antioch, Tennessee for several years. Parton's uncle, Dot Watson, and Dean built the home in 1970 and 1971. Her brothers Denver and Randy also worked on the structure. Several years later, they added a guest house to the property. Dean and Parton lived there together for more than 52 years until Dean's death in Nashville on March 3, 2025.

Although they never had children due to Parton's health issues, Parton and Dean helped raise some of her younger siblings in Nashville. Her nieces and nephews, and later grand‑nieces and grand‑nephews, referred to them as "Uncle Peepaw" and "Aunt Granny". The latter name was later used for one of Parton's Dollywood restaurants.

=== Health issues ===
Parton was diagnosed with endometriosis and had a partial hysterectomy in her late 30s, which affected her ability to have children and caused some weight gain. She also noted that, throughout her life, she had contended with kidney stones.

In May 2026, Parton said she was responding well to treatment after her immune and digestive systems, in her words, "got all out of whack". In an interview with People magazine in August shortly before her death, Parton said she had been having "hard times" with her health and had overlooked some issues while caring for her husband.

== Death ==
Parton was hospitalized at Vanderbilt-Ingram Cancer Center in Nashville, Tennessee, on August 21, 2026, and died after a "brief battle" with cancer on August 25, at age 80. Her death was announced the same day by her nephew, Bryan Seaver, who had served as her head of security for more than two decades. Parton had asked him several years prior to make the announcement of her death, which he described as "an honor that is mixed with absolute pride and great sadness".

A small, private funeral was held for Parton's immediate family, at her request, on August 28. She was entombed next to her husband in the mausoleum at Woodlawn Memorial Park in Nashville.

=== Tributes ===
The Academy of Country Music (ACM) said that Parton had "a legacy that reaches far beyond the stage". The Grand Ole Opry called her "a true country music icon". SiriusXM dedicated a tribute channel to her on CH 105. US president Donald Trump issued a statement describing her as "one of the greatest country singers" and ordered flags at half-staff for a week. Multiple state governors issued similar orders. Former presidents Joe Biden, Barack Obama, George W. Bush and Bill Clinton, as well as numerous politicians, also released tributes to Parton. Figures from the entertainment, film, and music industries paid tribute. Flowers were left at her Hollywood Walk of Fame star, her Music City Walk of Fame plaque in Nashville, her statue in downtown Sevierville, and at her home in Brentwood. Books of condolence were opened at the Country Music Hall of Fame and Museum.

On the evening following the announcement of Parton's death, both the Empire State Building in New York City and the Willis Tower in Chicago were illuminated in pink colors starting at 9:25 pm (EDT UTC–4), an allusion to "9 to 5". Before the staging of 9 to 5: The Musical in London on August 25, lead actress Karla Tracey honored Parton in a speech and dedicated that night's performance to her. Other cast members posted tributes on social media. The following day, the Band of the Coldstream Guards played "9 to 5" during the Changing the Guard ceremony at Buckingham Palace. A petition to posthumously rename Nashville International Airport in her honor surpassed 160,000 signatures after her death. On September 10, it was officially announced that the airport would be renamed.

Following and the day after the announcement of Parton's death, radio stations across the United States paused normal programming to honor her. In Knoxville, Tennessee, country music station 107.7 WIVK rebranded the day after her death as "Dolly 107.7" and dedicated its entire morning show to playing Parton's music. At 8:00 am CDT (9:00 eastern) nearly every major radio station in Tennessee observed a moment of silence and then played "I Will Always Love You". Listeners were encouraged to turn on their headlights and sing along. The Tennessee Association of Broadcasters said the effort was "meant to bring broadcasters and communities together to honor Parton's life, legacy and impact on the state". Across the United States, radio stations of all formats, ranging from classic hits to contemporary hit radio that had largely avoided playing Parton in her later decades, began playing selections from her discography, with "Jolene" and "9 to 5" gaining a particular bump in requests and spins and "Jolene" reaching No. 16 on the Billboard Hot 100 in the wake of Parton's death. Tennessee lawmaker Jessie Seal proposed making September 25 (9/25) "9 to 5 Day" to commemorate Parton. The Grand Ole Opry performance on the night of August 29 was dedicated to Parton. Performers included Carly Pearce, Kathy Mattea, and Dan Tyminski. Parton's death drew a level of attention and remembrance not seen for a musician in the United States since the death of Michael Jackson in 2009.

On September 14, it was announced that Bristol Motor Speedway would pay tribute to Parton throughout the 2026 Bass Pro Shops Night Race weekend. Parton's pink butterfly will be featured on the walls and speedway property, and decal stickers will be given to race teams to place on their cars. A tribute banner will also be displayed for fans to leave messages and signatures, and her music will be incorporated into the atmosphere during race weekend. The Tennessee Volunteers football team announced that they would honor Parton by wearing a sticker on their helmets during the 2026 season, and the team played her song "My Tennessee Mountain Home" at the start of the fourth quarter of their first game of the season.

=== Posthumous releases and productions ===
Prior to her death, Parton worked with a handpicked team for several years to develop a long-term roadmap for projects intended to continue her work for decades. The plans included previously unreleased music, books and consumer products, as well as a biographical film, documentary projects, scripted and animated television series, and several hospitality and entertainment ventures.

On August 31, 2026, Parton's estate announced Dollyfest, a celebration of her life and career to be held over consecutive weekends in Nashville and London in 2027. The festival had been conceived by Parton as a multi-artist event in Nashville to mark her 80th birthday in January 2026, at which she planned to host and perform, but was postponed after she stepped back from public appearances because of health concerns. Her final recording was released on the song "Torn", by Irish band U2, closing their album Carnaval de Luz (2026).

== Awards and honors ==
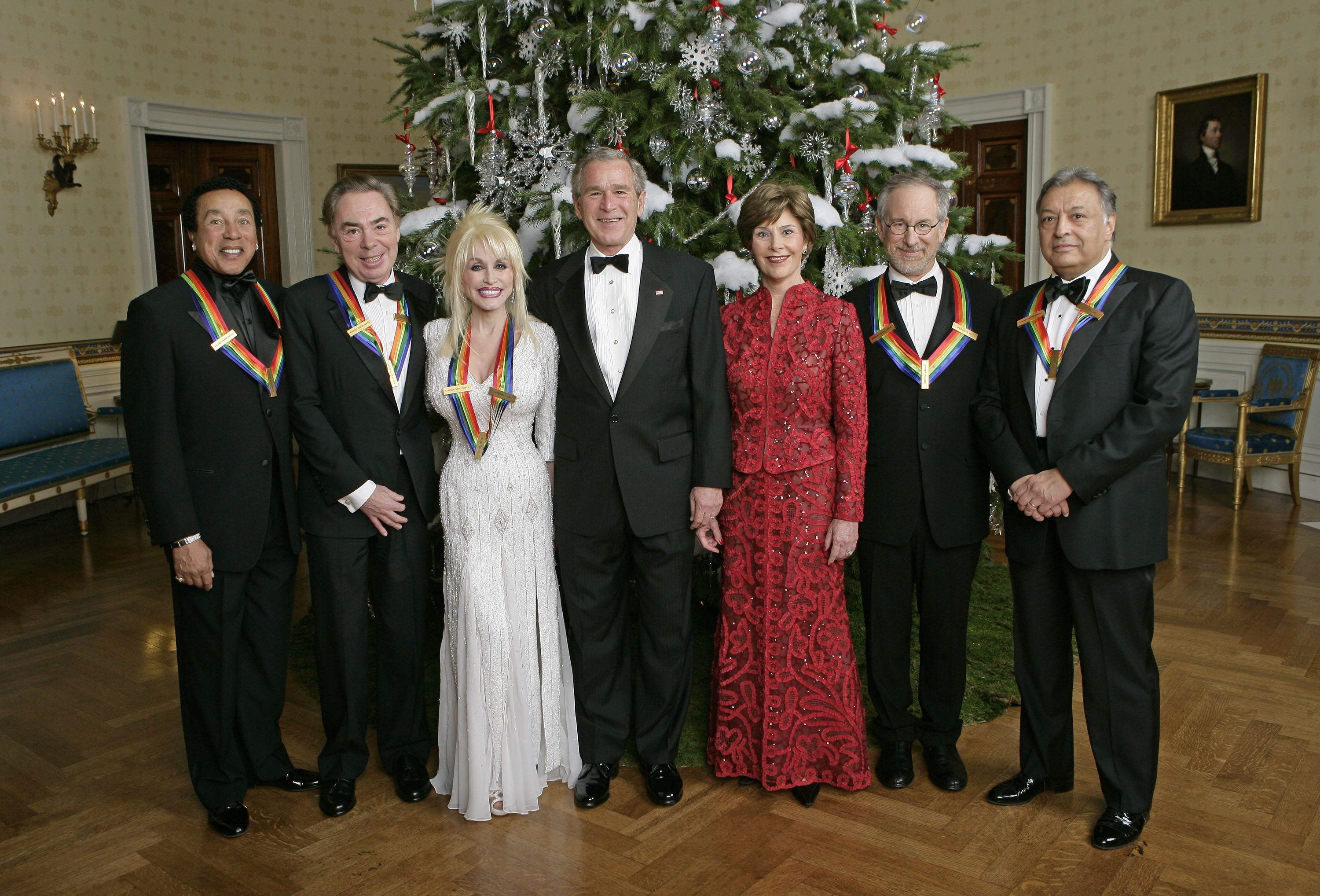
President George W. Bush and First Lady Laura Bush, with the John F. Kennedy Center for the Performing Arts honorees in the Blue Room of the White House during a 2006 reception. From left: singer-songwriter William "Smokey" Robinson; composer Andrew Lloyd Webber; Parton; film director Steven Spielberg; and conductor Zubin Mehta

Parton is one of the most-honored female country performers in history. The Record Industry Association of America certified 25 of her single or album releases as Gold, Platinum, or Multi-Platinum. She had 26 songs reach No. 1 on the Billboard country charts, a record for a female artist. She had 42 career Top 10 country albums, a record for any artist, and 110 career-charted singles over the past forty years. As of 2012, she had written more than 3,000 songs and sold more than a hundred million records, making her one of the best-selling female artists ever. As of 2021, she had appeared on the country music charts in each of seven decades, the most of any artist.

Parton earned 11 Grammy Awards (including her 2011 Lifetime Achievement Grammy) and received 55 Grammy nominations, the third-most nominations of any female artist.

At the American Music Awards, she won three awards out of eighteen nominations. At the Country Music Association, she won ten awards out of 42 nominations. At the Academy of Country Music, she won thirteen awards and 44 nominations. She was one of the few female artists to win the Country Music Association's highest honor, Entertainer of the Year (1978). She was also nominated for two Academy Awards and a Tony Award. She received an Emmy Award nomination for her appearance in a 1978 Cher television special.

In 1984, she was awarded a star on the Hollywood Walk of Fame for her music, located at 6712 Hollywood Boulevard in Hollywood, California, and in 1988, she received a star on the Nashville StarWalk for Grammy winners. A bronze statue of her was unveiled in 1987 in her hometown, the city of Sevierville, Tennessee, being designed by Jim Gray. She called the statue "the greatest honor", because it came from the people who knew her. Parton was inducted into the Grand Ole Opry in 1969 and in 1986 was named one of Ms. Magazine's Women of the Year. In 1986, she was inducted into the Nashville Songwriters Hall of Fame.

In 1999, Parton received country music's highest honor, an induction into the Country Music Hall of Fame. She received an honorary doctorate degree from Carson-Newman College in 1990. She was inducted into the National Academy of Popular Music/Songwriters Hall of Fame in 2001. In 2002, she ranked fourth among CMT's forty Greatest Women of Country Music.

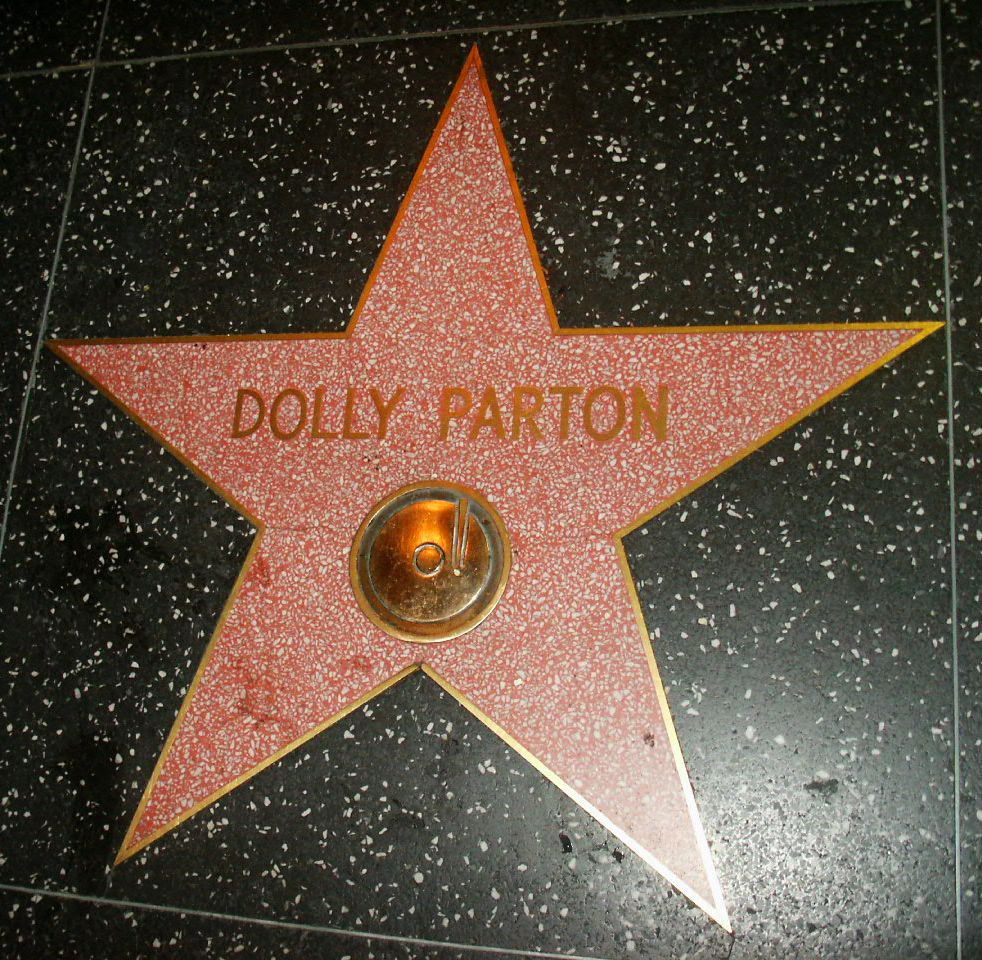
Parton's original star on the Hollywood Walk of Fame

Parton was honored in 2003 with a tribute album called Just Because I'm a Woman: Songs of Dolly Parton. The artists who recorded versions of Parton's songs included Melissa Etheridge ("I Will Always Love You"), Alison Krauss ("9 to 5"), Shania Twain ("Coat of Many Colors"), Meshell Ndegeocello ("Two Doors Down"), Norah Jones ("The Grass is Blue") and Sinéad O'Connor ("Dagger Through the Heart"). Parton herself contributed a re-recording of the title song, originally the title song for her first RCA album in 1968. Parton was awarded the Living Legend Medal by the US Library of Congress on April 14, 2004, for her contributions to the cultural heritage of the United States. She was also the focus of a Library of Congress collection exploring the influences of country music on her life and career. The collection contains images, articles, sheet music and more.

In 2005, she was honored with the National Medal of Arts, the highest honor given by the US government for excellence in the arts. The award is presented by the US president. On December 3, 2006, Parton received the Kennedy Center Honors from the John F. Kennedy Center for the Performing Arts for her lifetime of contributions to the arts. During the show, some of country music's biggest names came to show their admiration. Carrie Underwood performed "Islands in the Stream" with Rogers, Parton's original duet partner. Krauss performed "Jolene" and duetted "Coat of Many Colors" with Twain. McEntire and Reese Witherspoon also came to pay tribute. On November 16, 2010, Parton accepted the Liseberg Applause Award, the theme park industry's most prestigious honor, on behalf of Dollywood theme park during a ceremony held at IAAPA Attractions Expo 2010 in Orlando, Florida.

In 2015, a newly discovered species of lichen found growing in the southern Appalachians was named Japewiella dollypartoniana in honor of Parton's music and her efforts to bring national and global attention to that region. In 2018, Parton received a second star on the Hollywood Walk of Fame, inducted alongside Linda Ronstadt and Emmylou Harris in recognition of their work as a trio. Parton was also recognized in the Guinness World Records 2018 Edition for holding records for the Most Decades with a Top 20 hit on Billboard's Hot Country Songs Chart and Most Hits on Billboard's Hot Country Songs Chart by a Female Artist. In 2020, Parton received a Grammy award for her collaboration with For King & Country on their song, "God Only Knows". In 2021, she was included on the Time 100, Time's annual list of the hundred most influential people in the world. The New York Times called her among the three of America's Most Beloved Divas (alongside Patti LaBelle and Barbra Streisand).

During Donald Trump's first term, Parton turned down the Presidential Medal of Freedom twice due to her husband's illness and the ongoing pandemic. Parton turned down the Presidential Medal of Freedom a third time during the Biden presidency to avoid the appearance of politics. In response to a 2021 proposal by the Tennessee legislature to erect a statue of Parton, she asked the legislature to remove the bill from consideration: "Given all that's going on in the world, I don't think putting me on a pedestal is appropriate at this time."

In late 2022, Parton received a $100-million Courage and Civility Award from the founder of Amazon, Jeff Bezos. According to Bezos, the award was given to Parton because of her charity work focused on improving children's literacy around the world. Asteroid (10731) Dollyparton, the former 1998 BL3, was named in her honor in 2022. In 2023, Parton was awarded American Library Association Honorary Membership. She was a Kentucky Colonel, awarded to her by the governor of Kentucky in 2024.

=== Dolly Parton Day ===
Parton was honored with proclamations of "Dolly Parton Day" numerous times. In 1970, her hometown Sevierville, Tennessee, declared one day to be Dolly Parton Day. In 2011, the South Carolina General Assembly declared June 3, 2011, as Dolly Parton Day, in connection with the grand opening of Pirates Voyage in Myrtle Beach. In January 2026, Tennessee declared her 80th birthday to be Dolly Parton Day in the state.

In September 2026, following Parton's death the previous month, California governor Gavin Newsom signed Senate Bill 931, establishing September 25 as Dolly Parton Day. The date refers to her song "9 to 5", and the law requires the governor to proclaim the day annually. Sevier County, Tennessee, and the municipalities of Sevierville, Pigeon Forge, Gatlinburg and Pittman Center announced a joint proclamation designating September 25 as an annual Dolly Parton Day.

== Discography ==
Solo studio albums

- Hello, I'm Dolly (1967)
- Just Because I'm a Woman (1968)
- In the Good Old Days (When Times Were Bad) (1969)
- My Blue Ridge Mountain Boy (1969)
- The Fairest of Them All (1970)
- The Golden Streets of Glory (1971)
- Joshua (1971)
- Coat of Many Colors (1971)
- Touch Your Woman (1972)
- My Favorite Songwriter, Porter Wagoner (1972)
- My Tennessee Mountain Home (1973)
- Bubbling Over (1973)
- Jolene (1974)
- Love Is Like a Butterfly (1974)
- The Bargain Store (1975)
- Dolly: The Seeker & We Used To (1975)
- All I Can Do (1976)
- New Harvest...First Gathering (1977)
- Here You Come Again (1977)
- Heartbreaker (1978)
- Great Balls of Fire (1979)
- Dolly, Dolly, Dolly (1980)
- 9 to 5 and Odd Jobs (1980)
- Heartbreak Express (1982)
- Burlap & Satin (1983)
- The Great Pretender (1984)
- Real Love (1985)
- Rainbow (1987)
- White Limozeen (1989)
- Home for Christmas (1990)
- Eagle When She Flies (1991)
- Slow Dancing with the Moon (1993)
- Something Special (1995)
- Treasures (1996)
- Hungry Again (1998)
- Precious Memories (1999)
- The Grass Is Blue (1999)
- Little Sparrow (2001)
- Halos & Horns (2002)
- For God and Country (2003)
- Those Were the Days (2005)
- Backwoods Barbie (2008)
- Better Day (2011)
- Blue Smoke (2014)
- Pure & Simple (2016)
- I Believe in You (2017)
- A Holly Dolly Christmas (2020)
- Run, Rose, Run (2022)
- Rockstar (2023)

Collaborative studio albums

- Just Between You and Me (with Porter Wagoner) (1968)
- Just the Two of Us (with Porter Wagoner) (1968)
- Always, Always (with Porter Wagoner) (1969)
- Porter Wayne and Dolly Rebecca (with Porter Wagoner) (1970)
- Once More (with Porter Wagoner) (1970)
- Two of a Kind (with Porter Wagoner) (1971)
- The Right Combination • Burning the Midnight Oil (with Porter Wagoner) (1972)
- Together Always (with Porter Wagoner) (1972)
- We Found It (with Porter Wagoner) (1973)
- Love and Music (with Porter Wagoner) (1973)
- Porter 'n' Dolly (with Porter Wagoner) (1974)
- Say Forever You'll Be Mine (with Porter Wagoner) (1975)
- Porter & Dolly (with Porter Wagoner) (1980)
- Once Upon a Christmas (with Kenny Rogers) (1984)
- Trio (with Emmylou Harris and Linda Ronstadt) (1987)
- Honky Tonk Angels (with Loretta Lynn and Tammy Wynette) (1993)
- Trio II (with Emmylou Harris and Linda Ronstadt) (1999)
- Smoky Mountain DNA: Family, Faith and Fables (credited as Dolly Parton and Family) (2024)

== Filmography ==
Theatrical releases

- 9 to 5 (1980)
- The Best Little Whorehouse in Texas (1982)
- Rhinestone (1984)
- Steel Magnolias (1989)
- Straight Talk (1992)
- Frank McKlusky, C.I. (2002)
- Gnomeo & Juliet (2011)
- Joyful Noise (2012)

== Published works ==
- Parton, Dolly (1979). Just the Way I Am: Poetic Selections on "Reasons to Live, Reasons to Love and Reasons to Smile" from the Songs of Dolly Parton. Blue Mountain Press. ISBN 978-0883960431.
- Parton, Dolly (January 1, 1994). Dolly: My Life and Other Unfinished Business. HarperCollins. ISBN 978-0060177201.
- Parton, Dolly (January 1, 1994). Coat of Many Colors. illustrated by Judith Sutton. HarperCollins. ISBN 9780060234133.
- Parton, Dolly (January 1, 2006). Dolly's Dixie Fixin's: Love, Laughter and Lots of Good Food. Viking Studio. ISBN 9780670038145.
- Parton, Dolly (January 1, 2009). I Am a Rainbow. illustrated by Heather Sheffield. G.P. Putnam's Sons. ISBN 9780141330105.
- Parton, Dolly (November 27, 2012). Dream More: Celebrate the Dreamer in You. Putnam Pub Group. ISBN 9780399162480.
- Parton, Dolly; Boynton-Hughes, Brooke (October 18, 2016). Coat of Many Colors. Grosset & Dunlap/Penguin Random House. ISBN 9780451532374.
- Parton, Dolly; Oermann, Robert K. (November 17, 2020). Dolly Parton, Songteller: My Life in Lyrics. San Francisco: Chronicle Books. ISBN 978-1797205090.
- Parton, Dolly; Patterson, James (March 7, 2022). Run, Rose, Run. Little, Brown & Company. ISBN 978-0-7595-5434-4.
- Parton, Dolly (April 25, 2023). Dolly Parton's Billy The Kid Makes It Big. Penguin Workshop. ISBN 9780593661574.
- Parton, Dolly; Seaver, Rebecca; George-Warren, Holly (October 17, 2023). Behind the Seams: My Life in Rhinestones. Ten Speed Press. ISBN 9781984862129.
- Parton, Dolly; Parton-George, Rachel (September 17, 2024). Good Lookin' Cookin': A Year of Meals - A Lifetime of Family, Friends and Food. Ten Speed Press. ISBN 9781984863164.
- Parton, Dolly (October 1, 2024). Dolly Parton's Billy The Kid Comes Home for Christmas. Penguin Workshop. ISBN 9780593755006.
- Parton, Dolly; Roland, Tom (November 11, 2025). Star of the Show: My Life on Stage. Ten Speed Press. ISBN 978-1984863133.
- Parton, Dolly (December 2, 2025). Dolly Parton's Billy The Kid Dances His Heart Out. Penguin Workshop. ISBN 978-0593755020.
- Parton, Dolly; Boynton-Hughes, Brooke (May 26, 2026). Coat of Many Colors: 10th Anniversary Edition. Penguin Workshop. ISBN 9798217140640.

== See also ==
- Chasing rainbows
- List of American film actresses
- List of American television actresses
- List of composers of musicals
- List of country music performers
- List of music artists by net worth
- List of people from Tennessee
- List of philanthropists
- List of singer-songwriters

== Bibliography ==
- Parton, Dolly (1994). Dolly: My Life and Other Unfinished Business. HarperCollins. ISBN 978-0-06-017720-1.
- Whitburn, Joel (2005). Top Country Songs 1944–2005. Billboard/Record Research Inc. ISBN 978-0-89820-165-9.
- Parton, Willadeene (1996). Smoky Mountain Memories: Stories From The Hearts of Dolly Parton's Family. Rutledge Hill Press. ISBN 1-55853-404-0.
