= Hungry Again =

Studio album by Dolly Parton
- Released: August 25, 1998
- Recorded: February 1998
- Studios: Train Traxx (Nashville); House of Prayer (Locust Ridge)
- Genre: Country
- Length: 42:31
- Labels: Decca; Blue Eye
- Producers: Dolly Parton; Richie Owens

Dolly Parton chronology
| Treasures (1996) | Hungry Again (1998) | Trio II (1999) |

Singles from Hungry Again
- 1. "Honky Tonk Songs" Released: July 27, 1998; 2. "The Salt in My Tears" Released: November 9, 1998

Hungry Again is the thirty-fifth solo studio album by American singer-songwriter Dolly Parton. It was released on August 25, 1998, by Decca Records and Blue Eye Records. The album was produced by Parton and her cousin, Richie Owens. It is seen as a predecessor to Parton's critically acclaimed bluegrass trilogy, The Grass Is Blue, Little Sparrow, and Halos & Horns. It is the third album on which Parton was the exclusive songwriter after My Tennessee Mountain Home and Dolly.

== Background ==
When Rising Tide Records closed its Nashville branch in March 1998, Parton found herself without a label. It was announced in April 1998 that Parton had signed with Decca Records to release her new album, Hungry Again, due to be released in August.

Parton wrote the album over a three month period in 1997 at her lake cottage outside Nashville and at her Tennessee Mountain Home in Sevierville, which was immortalized in her 1973 hit song. Detailing the writing process for Billboard, Parton said, "I went back home and fasted, not so much in a religious way but as a means of humbling myself and getting into the spirit of things. I ended up with 37 of the best songs I'd written in years, if not the best ever." Parton said that the songs that made the album resulted in a "more acoustic-type album." She also said that if the album was successful she had enough songs leftover for two or three follow-up albums, which she jokingly said might be titled Still Hungry, Hungry Some More, or I'm Full Now.

The album was produced by Parton with her cousin, Richie Owens, and recorded in his basement studio with his band Shinola. "Shine On" was recorded at the House of Prayer where Parton's grandfather, Jake Owens, had been pastor for many years.

== Release and promotion ==
Parton appeared on The Rosie O'Donnell Show on April 2, 1998, where she performed "Paradise Road."

The album's first single, "Honky Tonk Songs", was shipped to country radio on July 7, with an adds date of July 27. The song's music video was put into Hot Shot rotation on CMT.

Shelia Shipley Biddy, Decca's senior vice-president, told Billboard in July that the label had a "massive national plan" set up to support the album. The plan included a heavy emphasis on national TV appearances and servicing the album to radio. They also considered releasing the album to retail locations in a lunch-box which would include an apple-shaped notepad, a carrot-shaped ink pen, and a Dolly Madison cupcake.

Parton made an appearance on The Tonight Show with Jay Leno on August 24 to promote the album, performing "Honky Tonk Songs".

The album was released on August 25, 1998.

On August 28, she made an appearance on Today where she performed "Honky Tonk Songs" and "9 to 5". Parton also stopped by Live with Regis and Kathie Lee on August 31 and performed the title track "Hungry Again". On September 30, Parton appeared on Prime Time Country where she performed "Honky Tonk Songs", "When Jesus Comes Calling for Me", "I Am Ready", and "The Salt in My Tears".

"The Salt in My Tears" was released as the second single on November 9. Following the second single's release, Parton made a second appearance on Live with Regis and Kathie Lee on November 24 and performed "The Salt in My Tears".

== Critical reception ==
Professional ratings
Review scores
| Source | Rating |
|---|---|
| AllMusic | 4.5/5 stars |
| Robert Christgau | (dud) |
| The Encyclopedia of Popular Music | 3/5 stars |

The album received mostly positive reviews from critics. Billboard gave a positive review of the album, saying that "Parton returns to her close-to-the-heart, personal writing and singing with this basement album." They went on to say "it's arguably some of the best stuff she has done in years," while also taking note that "country radio resoundingly rejected the first single." They felt that this was because "listeners no longer welcome such overt drinking songs told by a woman aiming to get drunk and dance." The review ended by saying that "after all these years, Parton remains a potent and special voice in country music."

Jana Pendragon at AllMusic gave the album four and a half stars out of five, calling the album "a timely, heartwarming project that displays all of the many aspects and facets of Parton's talent. She is endearing and respected, and she can still roll right over most anyone who gets in her way with a single note."

== Commercial performance ==
Hungry Again peaked at number 23 on the Billboard Top Country Albums chart and number 167 on the Billboard 200.

The album also peaked at number 3 on the UK Country Albums Chart and number 41 on the UK Albums Chart.

The first single, "Honky Tonk Songs", peaked at number 74 on the Billboard Hot Country Singles & Tracks chart and number 91 in Canada on the RPM Country Singles chart.

== Track listing ==
All tracks are written by Dolly Parton.

| No. | Title | Length |
|---|---|---|
| 1. | "Hungry Again" | 3:24 |
| 2. | "The Salt in My Tears" | 3:54 |
| 3. | "Honky Tonk Songs" | 4:32 |
| 4. | "Blue Valley Songbird" | 4:23 |
| 5. | "I Wanna Go Back There" | 3:06 |
| 6. | "When Jesus Comes Calling for Me" | 2:49 |
| 7. | "Time and Tears" | 2:56 |
| 8. | "I'll Never Say Goodbye" | 3:14 |
| 9. | "The Camel's Heart" | 3:15 |
| 10. | "I Still Lost You" | 3:36 |
| 11. | "Paradise Road" | 3:11 |
| 12. | "Shine On" | 4:11 |
| Total length: | | 42:31 |

== Personnel ==
Adapted from the album liner notes.

=== Music ===
- Lois Baker – background vocals
- Jim Boling – background vocals
- Paul Brewster – background vocals
- Mark A. Brooks – bass guitar, upright bass
- Gary Davis – banjo, acoustic guitar
- Rachel Dennison – background vocals
- Richard Dennison – background vocals
- Joy Gardner – background vocals
- Bob "Bubba" Grundner – drums, percussion
- Honky Tonk Women – background vocals
- House of Prayer Congregation – background vocals
- Teresa Hughes – background vocals
- Johnny Lauffer – organ, piano, strings
- Randy Leago – accordion
- Gary Mackey – fiddle, mandolin
- Louis Dean Nunley – background vocals
- Jennifer O'Brien – background vocals
- Bob Ocker – acoustic guitar, electric guitar
- Judy Ogle – background vocals
- Richie Owens – autoharp, bouzouki, dobro, acoustic guitar, electric guitar, harmonica, Kona guitar, mandolin, slide guitar, background vocals
- Ira Parker – background vocals
- Dolly Parton – lead vocals
- Al Perkins – pedal steel guitar
- Eric Rupert – bass guitar
- Darrin Vincent – background vocals
- Rhonda Vincent – background vocals
- Brian Waldschlager – background vocals

=== Art ===
- Art Direction – Virginia Team
- Design – Jerry Joyner
- Photography – Matt Barnes, Jim Herrington, J.R. Rabourn, and Jason Pirro
- Stylist – Susan Bessire
- Hairdresser – Cheryl Riddle
- Make-up – Paul Starr

== Charts ==
Album

| Chart (1998) | Peak Position |
|---|---|
| Scottish Albums (Official Charts) | 57 |
| UK Albums (Official Charts) | 41 |
| UK Country Albums (Official Charts) | 2 |
| US Billboard 200 | 167 |
| US Top Country Albums (Billboard) | 23 |

Singles

| Title | Year | Peak chart positions | |
| Title | Year | US Country | CAN Country |
|---|---|---|---|
| "Honky Tonk Songs" | 1998 | 74 | 91 |
