= Randy Parton =

American country music singer and actor (1953–2021)

Background information
- Born: Randle Huston Parton; December 15, 1953; Sevierville, Tennessee, U.S.
- Died: January 21, 2021 (aged 67) Sevierville, Tennessee, U.S.
- Genre: Country
- Occupations: Singer-songwriter; actor
- Instrument: Bass guitar
- Years active: 1977–2021
- Label: RCA

Randle Huston Parton (December 15, 1953 – January 21, 2021) was an American country music singer-songwriter, actor, and businessman.

== Early life ==
Randle Huston Parton was born in Sevierville, Tennessee, the eighth of twelve children born to Avie Lee Caroline (née Owens; 1923–2003) and Robert Lee Parton Sr. (1921–2000). He was a younger brother of singer-songwriters Dolly (1946–2026) and Stella Parton and an older brother of former actress Rachel Parton George. He had a daughter, Heidi Parton.

== Career ==
Parton was the first person to record the song "Roll On (Eighteen Wheeler)" in 1982. Two years later, in 1984, the band Alabama recorded it, and it became the group's 12th straight No. 1 single. Also in 1984, Parton sang a song for the Rhinestone soundtrack, and his sister Dolly starred in the film. He also played bass for his sister.

== Theatre manager ==
Parton is also known for the theater that once bore his name in Roanoke Rapids, North Carolina. In 2007, he signed a deal worth over $1.5 million yearly to manage and perform in a new theater bearing his name in the Carolina Crossroads entertainment and shopping complex.

The relationship between Parton and the city soured as the theater struggled to attract customers and questions arose concerning Parton's use of a nearly $3 million fund for personal travel and entertainment. Parton was also questioned by city leaders for unauthorized events held at the theater including a wedding reception for his daughter along with details about who would be marketing the theater. Throughout the controversy, Parton maintained that his actions were within the contract and that the theater would be successful given time. Parton's contract with the city was terminated on January 8, 2008, and the theater was renamed the Roanoke Rapids Theater. The city took over the theater and in July 2012 voted to allow electronic gambling to help pay expenses and possibly attract a buyer.

== Death ==
Randy Parton died of cancer on January 21, 2021, at age 67.

== Discography ==
=== Albums ===
Title	Details
There Was a Dream	Released: 1978; Label: Meteor; Format: LP
Shot Full of Love	Released: 1981; Label: Electric; Format: LP
America, From Where I Stand	Released: 1991; Label: Randy Parton; Format: Cassette

=== Singles ===
Title	Year	Peak chart positions	Album
Title	Year	US Country	Album
"Tennessee Born"	1975	—	Non-album single
"Losing Everything"	1975	—	Non-album single
"Down"	1977	—	Non-album single
"Hold Me Like You Never Had Me"	1981	30	Non-album single
"Shot Full of Love"	1981	30	Non-album single
"Don't Cry Baby"	1981	80	Non-album single
"Oh, No"	1982	76	Non-album single
"Roll on Eighteen Wheeler"	1982	—	Non-album single
"A Stranger in Her Bed"	1983	92	Non-album single

=== Other album appearances ===
Title	Year	Other artist(s)	Album
"Holdin' on to You"	1977	Dolly Parton	New Harvest...First Gathering
"Old Flames Can't Hold a Candle to You"	1980	Dolly Parton	Dolly, Dolly, Dolly
"Tennessee Homesick Blues"	1984	Dolly Parton	Rhinestone
"Too Much Water"	1984	—N/a	Rhinestone
"What a Heartache"	1984	Dolly Parton	Rhinestone
"You Are My Christmas"	2020	Dolly Parton, Heidi Parton	A Holly Dolly Christmas

Notes

1.Parton provided backing vocals on this track.
