= Rachel Parton George =

American actress and singer (born 1959)

- Born: Rachel Ann Parton; August 31, 1959 (age 67); Sevierville, Tennessee, U.S.
- Occupations: Actress; singer
- Years active: 1982–1999, 2024–present
- Height: 5 ft 4 in (163 cm)
- Spouses: Richard Dennison (1978–divorced); Eric George (current)
- Relatives: Bill Owens (uncle); Dolly Parton (sister); Stella Parton (sister); Randy Parton (brother); Heidi Parton (niece)

Rachel Ann Parton George (formerly Dennison, née Parton; born August 31, 1959) is an American singer and actress. She is the youngest sibling of entertainer Dolly Parton.

== Early life ==
Rachel Parton George was born Rachel Ann Parton on August 31, 1959, in Franklin, Tennessee. She is the youngest of twelve children born to Avie Lee Caroline (née Owens; 1923–2003) and Robert Lee Parton Sr. (1921–2000). In addition to famous sister Dolly, George's other performing siblings include singer/songwriter Stella Parton, and the late singer Randy Parton. Like all her older siblings, George was raised in the Church of God. As a child, George enjoyed wearing make-up and imitating her favorite stars. She quit school after the eighth grade and toured the country with her family, often doing her elder sisters' make-up and occasionally singing backup.

== Career ==
At age 15, George performed solo on stage for the first time. During her first performance, as she remembers, "right off I saw this new piano man (pianist Richard Dennison) and knew he was the fella for me." She and Dennison were married three years later. They divorced many years later and George remarried. Richard Dennison was still a member of Dolly Parton's band and still recorded with her up until her death.

In 1982, she landed her first and only acting role in the ABC television sitcom incarnation of 9 to 5. Though her sisters continued to use their maiden name Parton for their stage names, Rachel chose to be credited under her married surname Dennison. Before the show premiered, she stated in a People magazine interview: "I'm sure people will compare me to Dolly—it's only human nature." George's role, as bombshell secretary Doralee Rhodes, had been originated by her older sister in the hit 1980 theatrical film of the same name. 9 to 5 was shot before a live studio audience and co-starred Rita Moreno and Valerie Curtin. The series had an impressive beginning in the ratings, but after a retooling (including the addition of Leah Ayres to the cast), the series was canceled by ABC after 33 episodes in 1983. The sitcom proved popular in reruns, leading producers to revive it in first-run syndication in 1986. Sally Struthers joined the cast, and the sitcom's popularity revived, producing another 52 episodes before ending in 1988; Dennison remained a cast member from beginning to end.

During the network run of the series, George and her fellow cast members appeared on an episode of Battle of the Network Stars in 1983. George performed alongside her sister in a 1987 episode of her sister's variety series Dolly. George's last appearance on camera was during an episode of Bravo Profiles titled "Dolly Parton: Diamond in a Rhinestone World" in 1999. George has since retired from acting. Occasionally, she will sing with her siblings.

George and older sister Dolly co-wrote Good Lookin' Cookin, a cookbook based on recipes and meals that were a part of the Parton siblings' upbringing. The book was released in 2024. It ultimately reached No. 1 on the New York Times' Best Seller list (in the non-fiction "advice" category).
