= Dolly Parton albums discography =

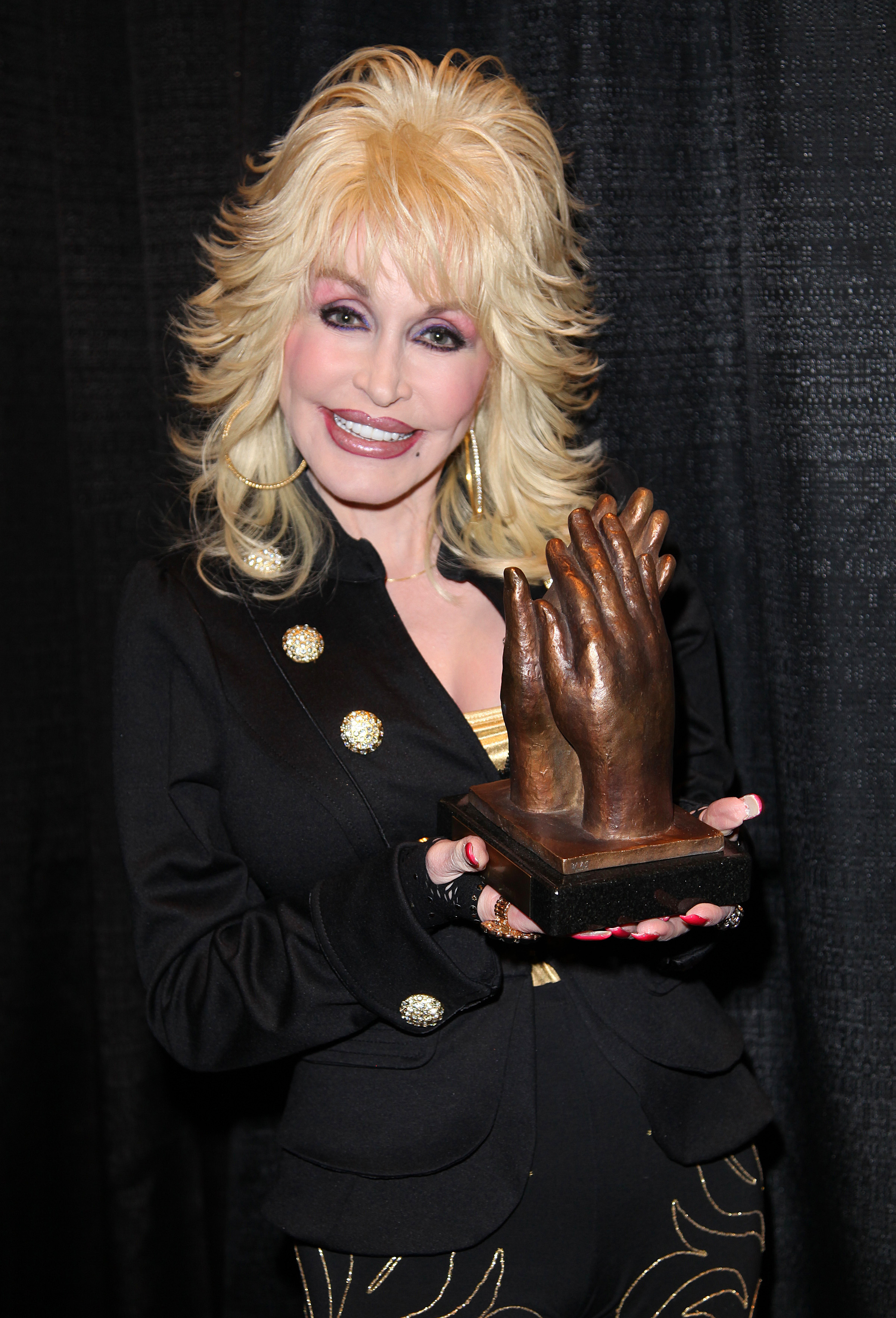
- Parton accepting the Liseberg Applause Award in 2010
- Studio albums: 49
- Soundtrack albums: 6
- Live albums: 9
- Compilation albums: 222
- Video albums: 8
- Collaborative albums: 5
- Cast albums: 3
- Promotional albums: 7
- Audiobooks: 10
- Notable compilation albums: 31
- Other album appearances: 190

The albums discography of American country singer-songwriter Dolly Parton includes 49 studio albums, four collaborative albums, nine live albums, six soundtrack albums, one extended play and approximately 222 compilation albums globally. Popularly referred as the "Queen of Country" by the media, she was also widely recognized as the most honored woman in country music history. She has charted 25 Number One songs (a record for a female country artist), 41 Top 10 country albums (a record for any artist) and has sold more than 100 million records worldwide, making her one of the best selling female country artists in history. As of January 2022, Parton's catalog has amassed more than 3 billion global streams.

Dolly Parton made her album debut in 1967 (she had previously achieved success as a songwriter for others), with her album Hello, I'm Dolly. With steady success during the remainder of the 1960s (both as a solo artist and with a series of duet albums with Porter Wagoner), her sales and chart peak came during the 1970s and continued into the 1980s; Parton's subsequent albums in the later part of the 1990s were lower in sales. At this time, country pop ruled the country albums and singles chart. However, in the new millennium, Parton achieved commercial success again. She released albums on independent labels after 2000, including albums on her own label, Dolly Records.

== Studio albums ==
=== 1960s ===
List of studio albums, with selected chart positions
Title	Details	Peak chart positions	
Title	Details	US	US Country
Hello, I'm Dolly	Released: September 18, 1967; Label: Monument; Format: LP	—	11
Just Because I'm a Woman	Released: April 15, 1968; Label: RCA Victor; Format: LP, 8-track, cassette	—	22
In the Good Old Days (When Times Were Bad)	Released: February 3, 1969; Label: RCA Victor; Format: LP, 8-track, cassette	—	15
My Blue Ridge Mountain Boy	Released: September 8, 1969; Label: RCA Victor; Format: LP, 8-track, cassette	194	6
"—" denotes a recording that did not chart or was not released in that territory.

=== 1970s ===
List of studio albums, with selected chart positions and certifications
Title	Details	Peak chart positions					Certifications (sales thresholds)
Title	Details	US	US Country	AUS	CAN	CAN Country	Certifications (sales thresholds)
The Fairest of Them All	Released: February 2, 1970; Label: RCA Victor; Format: LP, 8-track, cassette	—	13	—	—	—	
The Golden Streets of Glory	Released: February 15, 1971; Label: RCA Victor; Format: LP, 8-track, cassette	—	22	—	—	—	
Joshua	Released: April 12, 1971; Label: RCA Victor; Format: LP, 8-track, cassette	198	16	—	—	24	
Coat of Many Colors	Released: October 4, 1971; Label: RCA Victor; Format: LP, 8-track, cassette	—	7	—	—	—	ARIA: Gold
Touch Your Woman	Released: March 6, 1972; Label: RCA Victor; Format: LP, 8-track, cassette	—	19	—	—	—	
My Favorite Songwriter, Porter Wagoner	Released: October 2, 1972; Label: RCA Victor; Format: LP, 8-track, cassette	—	33	—	—	—	
My Tennessee Mountain Home	Released: April 2, 1973; Label: RCA Victor; Format: LP, 8-track, cassette	—	19	—	—	—	
Bubbling Over	Released: September 10, 1973; Label: RCA Victor; Format: LP, 8-track, cassette	—	14	—	—	—	
Jolene	Released: February 4, 1974; Label: RCA Victor; Format: LP, 8-track, cassette	—	6	—	—	—	RIAA: Gold; ARIA: 3× Platinum
Love Is Like a Butterfly	Released: September 16, 1974; Label: RCA Victor; Format: LP, 8-track, cassette	—	7	—	—	—	
The Bargain Store	Released: February 17, 1975; Label: RCA Victor; Format: LP, 8-track, cassette	—	9	—	—	—	
Dolly	Released: September 15, 1975; Label: RCA Victor; Format: LP, 8-track, cassette	—	14	—	—	—	
All I Can Do	Released: August 16, 1976; Label: RCA Victor; Format: LP, 8-track, cassette	—	3	—	—	—	
New Harvest...First Gathering	Released: February 14, 1977; Label: RCA Victor; Format: LP, 8-track, cassette	71	1	—	—	—	
Here You Come Again	Released: October 3, 1977; Label: RCA Victor; Format: LP, 8-track, cassette	20	1	83	12	—	RIAA: Platinum; ARIA: Gold; MC: Gold
Heartbreaker	Released: July 17, 1978; Label: RCA Victor; Format: LP, 8-track, cassette	27	1	67	20	1	RIAA: Gold; MC: Gold
Great Balls of Fire	Released: May 28, 1979; Label: RCA Victor; Format: LP, 8-track, cassette	40	4	48	28	1	RIAA: Gold
"—" denotes a recording that did not chart or was not released in that territory.

=== 1980s ===
List of studio albums, with selected chart positions and certifications
Title	Details	Peak chart positions						Certifications (sales thresholds)
Title	Details	US	US Cou.	AUS	CAN	CAN Cou.	SWE	Certifications (sales thresholds)
Dolly, Dolly, Dolly	Released: April 14, 1980; Label: RCA Victor; Format: LP, 8-track, cassette	71	7	—	—	1	—	
9 to 5 and Odd Jobs	Released: November 17, 1980; Label: RCA Victor; Format: LP, 8-track, cassette	11	1	33	15	3	15	RIAA: Gold; MC: Gold
Heartbreak Express	Released: March 29, 1982; Label: RCA Victor; Format: LP, 8-track, cassette	106	5	—	—	—	41	
Burlap & Satin	Released: May 2, 1983; Label: RCA Victor; Format: LP, 8-track, cassette	127	5	—	—	—	—	
The Great Pretender	Released: January 23, 1984; Label: RCA Victor; Format: LP, 8-track, cassette, CD	73	7	22	69	—	9	
Real Love	Released: January 21, 1985; Label: RCA Victor; Format: LP, 8-track, cassette, CD	—	9	—	—	—	30	
Rainbow	Released: November 23, 1987; Label: Columbia; Format: LP, cassette, CD	153	18	83	83	—	—	
White Limozeen	Released: May 30, 1989; Label: Columbia; Format: LP, cassette, CD	—	3	116	—	18	—	RIAA: Gold
"—" denotes a recording that did not chart or was not released in that territory.

=== 1990s ===
List of studio albums, with selected chart positions and certifications
Title	Details	Peak chart positions							Certifications (sales thresholds)
Title	Details	US	US Cou.	AUS	CAN	CAN Cou.	UK	UK Cou.	Certifications (sales thresholds)
Home for Christmas	Released: September 11, 1990; Label: Columbia; Format: LP, cassette, CD	—	74	—	—	—	—	—	RIAA: Gold
Eagle When She Flies	Released: March 7, 1991; Label: Columbia; Format: LP, cassette, CD	24	1	185	—	—	—	1	RIAA: Platinum; MC: Gold
Slow Dancing with the Moon	Released: February 23, 1993; Label: Columbia; Format: Cassette, CD	16	4	137	—	7	—	1	RIAA: Platinum; MC: Gold
Something Special	Released: August 22, 1995; Label: Columbia, Blue Eye; Format: Cassette, CD	54	10	—	—	7	—	6	
Treasures	Released: September 24, 1996; Label: Rising Tide, Blue Eye; Format: Cassette, CD	122	21	—	—	24	116	7	
Hungry Again	Released: August 25, 1998; Label: Decca, Blue Eye; Format: Cassette, CD	167	23	—	—	—	41	2	
Precious Memories	Released: April 17, 1999; Label: Blue Eye; Format: Cassette, CD	—	—	—	—	—	—	—	
The Grass Is Blue	Released: October 26, 1999; Label: Sugar Hill, Blue Eye; Format: Cassette, CD	198	24	—	—	—	—	8	
"—" denotes a recording that did not chart or was not released in that territory.

=== 2000s ===
List of studio albums, with selected chart positions and certifications
Title	Details	Peak chart positions									Certifications (sales thresholds)
Title	Details	US	US Blu.	US Cou.	US Ind.	AUS	IRE	SWE	UK	UK Cou.	Certifications (sales thresholds)
Little Sparrow	Released: January 23, 2001; Label: Sugar Hill, Blue Eye; Format: Cassette, CD	97	12	12	3	136	—	27	30	1	BPI: Silver
Halos & Horns	Released: July 9, 2002; Label: Sugar Hill, Blue Eye; Format: Cassette, CD	58	2	4	3	192	51	—	37	1	
For God and Country	Released: November 11, 2003; Label: Welk Music Group, Blue Eye; Format: CD	167	—	23	6	—	—	—	—	—	
Those Were the Days	Released: October 11, 2005; Label: Sugar Hill, Blue Eye; Format: CD, digital download	48	—	9	2	120	—	24	35	1	
Backwoods Barbie	Released: February 26, 2008; Label: Dolly; Format: CD, digital download	17	—	2	2	—	60	57	35	1	
"—" denotes a recording that did not chart or was not released in that territory.

=== 2010s–2020s ===
List of studio albums, with selected chart positions and certifications
Title	Details	Peak chart positions										Certifications (sales thresholds)
Title	Details	US	US Cou.	AUS	CAN	IRE	NZ	SCO	SWE	UK	UK Cou.	Certifications (sales thresholds)
Better Day	Released: June 28, 2011; Label: Dolly, Warner Music Nashville; Format: LP, CD, digital download	51	11	29	—	68	29	6	—	9	1	BPI: Silver
Blue Smoke	Released: January 31, 2014; Label: Dolly, Sony Masterworks; Format: LP, CD, digital download	6	2	7	—	21	1	2	43	2	4	BPI: Platinum
Pure & Simple	Released: August 19, 2016; Label: Dolly, RCA; Format: CD, digital download	11	1	9	20	33	39	2	—	2	1	BPI: Silver
I Believe in You	Released: September 29, 2017; Label: Dolly, RCA; Format: CD, digital download	173	20	80	—	—	—	90	—	—	—	
A Holly Dolly Christmas	Released: October 2, 2020; Label: Butterfly, 12Tone Music Group; Format: LP, 8-track, cassette, CD, digital download	16	1	37	14	13	13	11	41	16	—	RIAA: Gold; BPI: Silver
Run, Rose, Run	Released: March 4, 2022; Label: Butterfly; Format: LP, CD, digital download	34	4	—	—	—	—	4	—	23	1	
Rockstar	Released: November 17, 2023; Label: Butterfly, Big Machine; Format: LP, 8-track, cassette, CD, digital download, streaming	3	1	16	18	70	12	2	—	5	—	RIAA: Gold
"—" denotes a recording that did not chart or was not released in that territory.

== Collaborative albums ==
List of collaborative albums, with selected chart positions and certifications
Title	Details	Peak chart positions								Certifications (sales thresholds)
Title	Details	US	US Cou.	AUS	CAN	CAN Cou.	SWE	UK	UK Cou.	Certifications (sales thresholds)
Once Upon a Christmas (with Kenny Rogers)	Released: October 29, 1984; Label: RCA; Format: LP, cassette, CD	31	12	—	31	—	40	—	—	RIAA: 2× Platinum; MC: 5× Platinum
Trio (with Emmylou Harris and Linda Ronstadt)	Released: March 2, 1987; Label: Warner Bros.; Format: LP, 8-track, cassette, CD	6	1	4	4	—	29	60	1	RIAA: Platinum
Honky Tonk Angels (with Loretta Lynn and Tammy Wynette)	Released: November 2, 1993; Label: Columbia; Format: Cassette, CD	42	6	177	44	6	—	—	10	RIAA: Gold; MC: Gold
Trio II (with Emmylou Harris and Linda Ronstadt)	Released: February 9, 1999; Label: Asylum; Format: Cassette, CD	62	4	66	—	4	—	—	4	RIAA: Gold; MC: Gold
Smoky Mountain DNA: Family, Faith and Fables (credited as Dolly Parton and Family)	Released: November 15, 2024; Label: Owepar Entertainment; Format: LP, CD, digital download, streaming	—	—	—	—	—	—	—	1 (Note: Smoky Mountain DNA: Family, Faith and Fables peaked at #1 on the Country Compilations Chart)	
"—" denotes a recording that did not chart or was not released in that territory.

== Extended plays ==
Title	Details
Sha-Kon-O-Hey! Land of Blue Smoke	Released: February 11, 2009; Label: Dolly; Format: CD

== Live albums ==
List of live albums, with selected chart positions
Title	Details	Peak chart positions					
Title	Details	US	US Cou.	US Ind.	AUS	CAN Cou.	UK
A Real Live Dolly	Released: June 29, 1970; Label: RCA Victor; Format: LP, 8-track	154	32	—	—	—	—
In Concert (with Ronnie Milsap, Charley Pride, Chet Atkins, Gary Stewart and Jerry Reed)	Released: April 14, 1975; Label: RCA; Format: LP, 8-track, cassette	—	19	—	—	—	—
Heartsongs: Live from Home	Released: September 27, 1994; Label: Columbia, Blue Eye; Format: Cassette, CD	87	16	—	175	38	—
Live and Well	Released: September 14, 2004; Label: Sugar Hill, Blue Eye; Format: CD	161	22	12	—	—	169
Live at the Boarding House (Note: This album is a recording of a radio broadcast from April 23, 1977 of Parton performing at the Boarding House in San Francisco, California. The concert does not survive in its entirety, as all releases of this concert are missing the last four songs from the set list.)	Released: 2006; Label: SRI, Craze Productions; Format: CD	—	—	—	—	—	—
Love Always: Live (Note: This album features Parton's January 18, 2001 performance on Austin City Limits (which aired on March 24, 2001), with bonus tracks performed by various other country artists)	Released: 2008; Label: Country Stars; Format: CD	—	—	—	—	—	—
Live from London	Released: November 10, 2009; Label: Dolly; Format: CD + DVD, digital download	195	36	25	—	—	33
Live at the Bottom Line (Note: This album was recorded May 14, 1977, at the Bottom Line in New York City, during Parton's final night of a three-night engagement. It was broadcast as a part of the Live at the Bottom Line radio series.)	Released: July 24, 2015; Label: Hotspur; Format: CD	—	—	—	—	—	—
Live from Glastonbury 2014	Released: November 25, 2016; Label: Masterworks, Sony Music EU; Formats: LP	—	—	—	—	—	—
"—" denotes a recording that did not chart or was not released in that territory.

== Soundtrack albums ==
List of soundtrack albums, with selected chart positions and sales figures
Title	Details	Peak chart positions				Certifications (sales thresholds)
Title	Details	US	US Cou.	AUS	CAN	Certifications (sales thresholds)
9 to 5	Released: December 8, 1980; Label: 20th Century Fox; Format: LP, 8-track, cassette	77	—	—	—	ARIA: 3× Platinum
The Best Little Whorehouse in Texas	Released: July 12, 1982; Label: MCA; Format: LP, cassette, CD	63	5	—	—	
Rhinestone	Released: June 18, 1984; Label: RCA; Format: LP, cassette, 8-track, CD	135	32	—	—	
Straight Talk	Released: March 31, 1992; Label: Hollywood; Format: Cassette, CD	138	22	—	28	
Joyful Noise	Released: January 10, 2012; Label: WaterTower Music; Format: CD, digital download	12	—	—	—	
Dumplin'	Released: November 30, 2018; Label: Dolly, RCA Nashville; Format: CD, digital download	143	16	119	—	US: 23,200
"—" denotes a recording that did not chart or was not released in that territory.

== Cast albums ==
List of cast albums, with selected chart positions
Title	Details	Peak chart positions		
Title	Details	US	US Cast	US Ind.
9 to 5: The Musical (Note: Parton does not perform on this album, but she composed all of the music and lyrics) (Original Broadway Cast Recording)	Released: July 14, 2009; Label: Dolly; Format: CD, digital download	130	3	16
My People (The Original Cast Album)	Released: November 9, 2013; Label: The Dollywood Company; Format: CD	—	—	—
9 to 5: The Musical (Note: Parton appears on three tracks on this album, in addition to composing all of the music and lyrics) (West End Cast Recording)	Released: February 7, 2020; Label: ATG Productions; Format: CD, digital download, streaming	—	—	—
"—" denotes a recording that did not chart or was not released in that territory.

== Promotional albums ==
List of promotional albums
Title	Details
Grand Ole Opry: Program No. 482	Released: 1967; Label: WSM; Format: LP
A Personal Music Dialogue with Dolly Parton	Released: 1977; Label: RCA; Format: LP
Together (with Emmylou Harris)	Released: 1977; Label: Warner Bros.; Format: LP
Home for Christmas with Dolly Parton: The Radio Special	Released: December 1990; Label: Columbia; Format: CD
Honky Tonk Angels: Special Radio Hour (with Loretta Lynn and Tammy Wynette)	Released: November 1993; Label: Columbia; Format: CD
The Grass Is Blue: Interview Disc	Released: 1999; Label: Sugar Hill, Blue Eye; Format: CD
Halos & Horns: Radio Special	Released: 2002; Label: Sugar Hill, Blue Eye; Format: CD

== Video albums ==
List of video albums, with certifications
Title	Details	Certifications (sales thresholds)
Dolly in London	Released: 1983; Label: RCA, Columbia Pictures Home Video; Format: VHS, LaserDisc	
Real Love (with Kenny Rogers)	Released: 1985; Label: RCA, Columbia Pictures Home Video; Format: VHS, LaserDisc	
Behind the Scenes	Released: 2003; Label: Welk Music Group, Blue Eye; Format: DVD	
Live and Well	Released: September 14, 2004; Label: Sugar Hill, Blue Eye; Format: DVD	MC: Gold
Dolly Parton & Friends	Released: February 27, 2007; Label: MPI Home Video; Format: DVD	ARIA: 2× Platinum
Love Always: Live from Texas	Released: 2008; Label: Country Stars; Format: DVD	
Live from London	Released: November 10, 2009; Label: Dolly; Format: DVD	
An Evening with Dolly	Released: April 2, 2012; Label: Dolly, Cracker Barrel; Format: DVD + CD	RIAA: Gold

== Audiobooks ==
List of audiobooks
Title	Details
Dolly: My Life and Other Unfinished Business	Released: October 1994; Label: Harper Audio; Format: Cassette
Dream More: Celebrate the Dreamer in You	Released: November 27, 2012; Label: Penguin Audio; Format: CD, digital download
Songteller: My Life in Lyrics	Released: November 17, 2020; Label: Recorded Books; Format: CD, digital download
Run, Rose, Run	Released: March 7, 2022; Label: Little, Brown & Company; Format: CD, digital download
Dolly Parton's Billy the Kid Makes It Big	Released: April 25, 2023; Label: Listening Library; Format: digital download
Behind the Seams: My Life in Rhinestones	Released: October 17, 2023; Label: Random House Audio; Format: digital download
Good Lookin' Cookin': A Year of Meals – A Lifetime of Family, Friends, and Food	Released: September 17, 2024; Label: Random House Audio; Format: digital download
Dolly Parton's Billy the Kid Comes Home for Christmas	Released: October 1, 2024; Label: Listening Library; Format: digital download
Star of the Show: My Life on Stage	Released: November 11, 2025; Label: Random House Audio; Format: digital download
Dolly Parton's Billy the Kid Dances His Heart Out	Released: December 2, 2025; Label: Listening Library; Format: digital download

== Notable compilation albums ==
There have been over 200 compilation albums of Parton's material released over the years. The table below presents notable compilation albums. To be considered notable the album must contain some previously unreleased material, have appeared on a music chart, or have received a certification.

List of notable compilation albums, with selected chart positions and certifications
Title	Details	Peak chart positions						Certifications (sales thresholds)
Title	Details	US	US Cou.	AUS	CAN	SWE	UK	Certifications (sales thresholds)
Hits Made Famous by Country Queens (Note: Budget album containing six Parton tracks: "It Wasn't God Who Made Honky Tonk Angels", "Making Believe", "Letter to Heaven", "Release Me", "Two Little Orphans", and "Little Blossom") (with Faye Tucker)	Released: April 13, 1963; Label: Somerset; Format: LP	—	—	—	—	—	—	
As Long as I Love (Note: Compilation of unused material from Parton's time with Monument Records)	Released: June 8, 1970; Label: Monument; Format: LP	—	—	—	—	—	—	
The Best of Dolly Parton (Note: Contains two new recordings: "Mule Skinner Blues (Blue Yodel No. 8)" and "How Great Thou Art")	Released: November 9, 1970; Label: RCA Victor; Format: LP	—	12	—	—	—	—	RIAA: Gold
Best of Dolly Parton	Released: July 14, 1975; Label: RCA Victor; Format: LP, 8-track, cassette	—	5	—	—	—	—	
18 Greatest Hits	Released: 1977; Label: RCA; Format: LP	—	—	—	—	—	—	ARIA: Gold
Greatest Hits	Released: September 13, 1982; Label: RCA; Format: LP, 8-track, cassette	77	7	—	58	—	74	RIAA: Platinum; ARIA: Platinum: BPI: Gold
The Winning Hand (Note: Compilation album featuring reworked versions of songs that Parton recorded during her time with Monument Records) (with Willie Nelson, Kris Kristofferson and Brenda Lee)	Released: November 1, 1982; Label: Monument; Format: LP, cassette	109	4	—	—	—	—	
The Love Album	Released: 1983; Label: RCA; Format: LP, cassette	—	—	—	—	—	—	NVPI: Platinum
Think About Love (Note: Contains remixed/alternate versions of "Think About Love", "She Don't Love You (Like I Love You)", "We Had It All", "Do I Ever Cross Your Mind", and "I Can't Help Myself (Sugar Pie, Honey Bunch)")	Released: April 15, 1986; Label: RCA; Format: LP, cassette, CD	—	54	—	—	—	—	
Dolly Parton's 16 Biggest Hits	Released: 1986; Label: J & B; Format: LP, cassette	—	—	27	—	—	—	
Best of Dolly Parton, Vol. 3 (Note: Contains the first release of the song "Potential New Boyfriend" as the album that it came from, Burlap & Satin, was not available on CD at the time)	Released: September 22, 1987; Label: RCA Nashville; Format: LP, cassette, CD	—	—	—	—	—	—	
Everything's Beautiful (Note: Contains Parton's Monument era recording of "Everything's Beautiful (In Its Own Way)" and alternate versions of "I'm Not Worth the Tears", "Why, Why, Why", "The Giving and the Taking", and "I Don't Want You Around Me Anymore")	Released: 1988; Label: Success; Format: CD	—	—	—	—	—	—	
Kenny Rogers & Dolly Parton, Vol. 2	Released: 1989; Label: Success; Format: LP, CD	—	—	80	—	—	—	
The Greatest Hits	Released: 1994; Label: Telestar; Format: Cassette, CD	—	—	—	—	—	65	
I Will Always Love You: The Essential Dolly Parton One (Note: Contains two previously unreleased tracks: "To Daddy" and Parton's solo version of "Real Love")	Released: 1995; Label: RCA; Format: Cassette, CD	—	—	—	—	—	—	ARIA: Gold
I Will Always Love You and Other Greatest Hits	Released: April 1996; Label: Columbia; Format: Cassette, CD	—	47	—	—	—	—	
Super Hits	Released: 1996; Label: RCA; Format: Cassette, CD	—	—	—	—	—	—	RIAA: Gold
The Best of Dolly Parton	Released: 1997; Label: Camden; Format: CD	—	—	—	—	—	—	ARIA: Gold; BPI: Silver
A Life in Music: The Ultimate Collection	Released: October 27, 1997; Label: RCA; Format: CD	—	—	36	—	—	38	ARIA: Gold; BPI: Gold
Love Songs	Released: 1999; Label: Camden; Format: CD	—	—	—	—	—	—	BPI: Silver; ARIA: Gold
Legendary Dolly Parton	Released: 2000; Label: RCA, BMG; Format: 3×CD	—	—	—	—	—	—	ARIA: Platinum
Gold Greatest Hits	Released: 2001; Label: RCA; Format: CD	—	—	—	—	—	23	BPI: Silver
Here You Come Again	Released: 2001; Label: BMG Sweden; Format: CD	—	—	—	—	4	—	
Ultimate Dolly Parton	Released: June 3, 2003; Label: RCA Nashville; Format: CD	5	3	49	9	8	17	RIAA: Gold; ARIA: Platinum; BPI: Platinum
Ultimate Dolly Parton (two-disc version)	Released: June 3, 2003; Label: RCA Nashville; Format: CD	—	74	—	—	—	—	
The Only Dolly Parton Album You'll Ever Need	Released: June 7, 2004; Label: RCA; Format: CD	—	—	—	—	—	127	
The Essential Dolly Parton	Released: 2005; Label: RCA, Legacy; Format: CD	85	15	140	—	46	—	
Singer, Songwriter & Legendary Performer (Note: Contains six previously unreleased live tracks: "Baby, I'm Burnin'", "Two Doors Down", "The Grass Is Blue", "Jolene", "9 to 5", and "Hello God"; and five new studio recordings: "Coat of Many Colors", "These Old Bones", "Little Sparrow", God's Coloring Book", and "I Will Always Love You")	Released: February 25, 2007; Label: Dolly; Format: CD	—	—	—	—	—	—	
The Very Best of Dolly Parton	Released: March 25, 2007; Label: Sony BMG; Format: CD	—	—	21	—	1	8	ARIA: Platinum; BPI: 2× Platinum
Dolly (Note: Contains seven previously unreleased tracks: "Gonna Hurry (As Slow as I Can)", "Nobody But You", "I've Known You All My Life", "Everything's Beautiful (In Its Own Way)", "God's Coloring Book", "Eugene, Oregon", and "What Will Baby Be"))	Released: October 27, 2009; Label: Sony Legacy; Format: CD	—	59	—	—	—	—	
Wanted (Note: Contains seven previously unreleased track from Parton's time with Monument Records: "Send Me No Roses", "Wanted", "I Keep Intending to Tell You", "You Made a Woman of Me Too Soon", "Only Me and My Hairdresser Know", "Not from My World", and "You Never Took the Time")	Released: December 14, 2010; Label: Jukebox; Format: Digital download	—	—	—	—	—	—	
The Hits	Released: November 6, 2012; Label: Camden International; Format: CD	—	—	100	—	—	—	
The Real...Dolly Parton	Released: October 14, 2013; Label: Sony Music Entertainment; Format: CD	—	—	—	—	—	88	BPI: Gold
The Complete Trio Collection (Note: Compilation album featuring 20 alternate takes and unreleased tracks) (with Emmylou Harris and Linda Ronstadt)	Released: September 9, 2016; Label: Rhino; Format: CD, digital download, streaming	124	7	—	—	—	47	
My Dear Companion: Selections from the Trio Collection (with Emmylou Harris and Linda Ronstadt)	Released: September 9, 2016; Label: Rhino; Format: CD	—	—	3	—	—	—	
Diamonds & Rhinestones: The Greatest Hits Collection	Released: November 18, 2022; Label: Sony Legacy; Format: CD, LP, digital download, streaming	24	4	47	20	—	5	BPI: Gold
The Dollywood Collection: Celebrating 40 Years of Music & Memories	Released: May 2, 2025; Label: Butterfly Records; Format: Digital download, streaming	—	—	—	—	—	—	

== Other album appearances ==
Parton has contributed to over 100 other albums throughout her career. These contributions range from solo recordings and duets to providing backing and harmony vocals for other artists. This additional work spans Parton's entire career, beginning in 1966 when she provided uncredited harmony vocals on Bill Phillips' recording of her composition "Put It Off Until Tomorrow" through her most recent collaboration with Positive Vibrations in 2022, a reggae version of her 1978 hit "Two Doors Down".
