= The Essential Dolly Parton =

Greatest hits album by Dolly Parton
- Released: May 28, 2005
- Genres: Country; pop
- Length: 121:15
- Labels: RCA; Legacy

Dolly Parton chronology
Live and Well (2004)	The Essential Dolly Parton (2005)	Those Were the Days (2005)

The Essential Dolly Parton is a greatest hits album by the American country singer-songwriter Dolly Parton as her volume in Sony Legacy's Essential series.

== Critical reception ==
Professional ratings
Review scores
Source	Rating
AllMusic	5/5 stars
AllMusic (3.0 edition)	3.5/5 stars
The Encyclopedia of Popular Music	4/5 stars
PopMatters	7/10
Q	4/5 stars
Stylus Magazine	B+

In a review of the album for AllMusic, Stephen Thomas Erlewine wrote that it "is one of the handful that gets it right" doing "a tremendous job of picking the biggest and the best" of her songs, and concludes by saying "Dividing her material in this fashion makes each disc consistent within itself, and helps make this a more listenable set than such similar career-spanning collections as 1993's The RCA Years". In her review of the album for PopMatters, Maura McAndrew stated that it consists of "twin discs that span her legendary career" while noting that it "makes me feel as though I suddenly understand the cultural fascination with Dolly Parton. She's a queen of contradiction: she may have outlandish style, but she makes honest, pure, American music and has a true American story to tell." In a review for Record Collector magazine, Terry Staunton summarized it by saying that "This is a rounded, if not wholly satisfying package; a few more selections from her bluegrass recordings (2001's Little Sparrow, in particular) would have been welcome, but having said that, there are very few misfires among the 37 tracks that made the final cut."

== Track listing ==
All tracks are written by Dolly Parton, except where noted.

Disc one
No.	Title	Writer(s)	Album	Length
1.	"Dumb Blonde"	Curly Putman	Hello, I'm Dolly (1967)	2:29
2.	"Just Because I'm a Woman"		Just Because I'm a Woman (1968)	3:04
3.	"My Blue Ridge Mountain Boy"		My Blue Ridge Mountain Boy (1969)	3:29
4.	"Mule Skinner Blues (Blue Yodel No. 8)"	Jimmie Rodgers	The Best of Dolly Parton (1970)	3:09
5.	"Joshua"		Joshua (1971)	3:04
6.	"Coat of Many Colors"		Coat of Many Colors (1971)	3:04
7.	"Touch Your Woman"		Touch Your Woman (1972)	2:41
8.	"My Tennessee Mountain Home"		My Tennessee Mountain Home (1973)	3:07
9.	"Jolene"		Jolene (1974)	2:41
10.	"Please Don't Stop Loving Me" (duet with Porter Wagoner)	Dolly Parton; Porter Wagoner	Porter 'n' Dolly (1974)	2:47
11.	"I Will Always Love You"		Jolene	2:55
12.	"Love Is Like a Butterfly"		Love Is Like a Butterfly (1974)	2:21
13.	"The Bargain Store"		The Bargain Store (1975)	2:42
14.	"The Seeker"		Dolly (1975)	3:15
15.	"We Used To"		Dolly	3:12
16.	"All I Can Do"		All I Can Do (1976)	2:25
17.	"Light of a Clear Blue Morning"		New Harvest...First Gathering (1977)	4:56
18.	"It's All Wrong, But It's All Right"		Here You Come Again (1977)	3:17

Disc two
No.	Title	Writer(s)	Album	Length
1.	"Here You Come Again"	Barry Mann; Cynthia Weil	Here You Come Again	2:54
2.	"Two Doors Down"		Here You Come Again	3:06
3.	"Heartbreaker"	Carole Bayer Sager; David Wolfert	Heartbreaker (1978)	3:30
4.	"I Really Got the Feeling"	Billy Vera	Heartbreaker	3:08
5.	"You're the Only One"	Carole Bayer Sager; Bruce Robert	Great Balls of Fire (1979)	3:20
6.	"Starting Over Again"	Bruce Sudano; Donna Summer	Dolly, Dolly, Dolly (1980)	3:58
7.	"Old Flames Can't Hold a Candle to You"	Hugh Moffatt; Pebe Sebert	Dolly, Dolly, Dolly	3:25
8.	"9 to 5"		9 to 5 and Odd Jobs (1980)	3:00
9.	"But You Know I Love You"	Mike Settle	9 to 5 and Odd Jobs	3:18
10.	"Single Women"	Michael O'Donoghue	Heartbreak Express (1982)	3:44
11.	"Heartbreak Express"		Heartbreak Express	3:13
12.	"Islands in the Stream" (duet with Kenny Rogers)	Barry Gibb; Maurice Gibb; Robin Gibb	Eyes That See in the Dark (1983)	4:10
13.	"Save the Last Dance for Me"	Doc Pomus; Mort Shuman	The Great Pretender (1984)	3:50
14.	"Tennessee Homesick Blues"		Rhinestone (1984)	3:23
15.	"God Won't Get You"		Rhinestone	4:13
16.	"To Know Him Is to Love Him" (with Emmylou Harris and Linda Ronstadt)	Phil Spector	Trio (1987)	3:51
17.	"Why'd You Come in Here Lookin' Like That"	Bob Carlisle; Randy Thomas	White Limozeen (1989)	2:33
18.	"Rockin' Years" (featuring Ricky Van Shelton)	Floyd Parton	Eagle When She Flies (1991) and Backroads (1991)	3:26
19.	"Shine"	Ed Roland	Little Sparrow (2001)	5:10

Limited-edition 3.0 bonus disc
No.	Title	Writer(s)	Album	Length
1.	"Something Fishy"		Hello, I'm Dolly	2:07
2.	"In the Good Old Days (When Times Were Bad)"		In the Good Old Days (When Times Were Bad) (1969)	2:46
3.	"Just Someone I Used to Know" (duet with Porter Wagoner)	Jack Clement	Porter Wayne and Dolly Rebecca (1970)	2:24
4.	"My Blue Tears"		Coat of Many Colors	2:16
5.	"Early Morning Breeze"		Jolene	2:47
6.	"Baby I'm Burnin'"		Heartbreaker	2:37
7.	"Think About Love"	Richard Brannan; Tom Campbell	Real Love (1985)	3:27
8.	"Yellow Roses"		White Limozeen	3:55

== Charts ==
Chart performance for The Essential Dolly Parton
Chart (2008–2026)	Peak position
Australian Albums (ARIA)	140
Swedish Albums (Sverigetopplistan)	46
UK Album Downloads (Official Charts)	18
UK Country Compilation Albums (Official Charts)	2
US Billboard 200	85
US Top Country Albums (Billboard)	15

== Certifications ==
Certifications for The Essential Dolly Parton
Region	Certification	Certified units/sales
Sweden (GLF)	Gold	15,000^{‡}
^{‡} Sales+streaming figures based on certification alone.
