= The Right Combination / Burning the Midnight Oil =

Studio album by Porter Wagoner and Dolly Parton
- Released: January 3, 1972
- Recorded: December 9, 1970–September 30, 1971
- Studio: RCA Studio B (Nashville)
- Genre: Country
- Length: 24:10
- Label: RCA Victor
- Producer: Bob Ferguson

Porter Wagoner and Dolly Parton chronology
The Best of Porter Wagoner & Dolly Parton (1971)	The Right Combination / Burning the Midnight Oil (1972)	Together Always (1972)

Dolly Parton chronology
Coat of Many Colors (1971)	The Right Combination / Burning the Midnight Oil (1972)	Touch Your Woman (1972)

Singles from The Right Combination / Burning the Midnight Oil
- 1. "The Right Combination" Released: May 24, 1971; 2. "Burning the Midnight Oil" Released: October 18, 1971

The Right Combination / Burning the Midnight Oil is the seventh collaborative studio album by Porter Wagoner and Dolly Parton. It was released on January 3, 1972, by RCA Victor.

The album was made available as a digital download on January 4, 2019.

== Critical reception ==
Professional ratings
Review scores
Source	Rating
AllMusic	4.5/5 stars
The Encyclopedia of Popular Music	3/5 stars

The review published in the January 15, 1972 issue of Billboard said, "Porter and Dolly have here an LP that will be a big hit for them in the first few months of 1972. Each of the stars has written a few cuts and their performance of their own material is beautiful. Highlights include "The Right Combination", "More Than Words Can Tell", "The Fog Has Lifted", and "Her and the Car and the Mobile Home" (a comedy spotlight)."

Cashbox published a review in the January 15, 1972 issue that said, "Judging from their popularity it's undisputable that Porter Wagoner and Dolly Parton have the right combination to open the doors of success. Unlike most other C&W duets who spend most of the time harmonizing with occasional solos, Porter & Dolly are not only adept at their harmonies, they allow each other room for individual expression within the scope of each arrangement. Most unique is the extent to which they feel at ease with each other; the goodtime dialogue and banter in songs such as "I've Been This Way Too Long" is as much a part of the right combination as the music."

== Commercial performance ==
The album peaked at No. 6 on the US Billboard Hot Country LP's chart.

The album's first single, "The Right Combination", was released in May 1971 and peaked at No. 14 on the US Billboard Hot Country Singles chart and No. 106 on the US Billboard Bubbling Under the Hot 100 chart. It peaked at No. 26 in Canada on the RPM Country Singles chart. The second single, "Burning the Midnight Oil", was released in October 1971 and peaked at No. 11 on the US Billboard Hot Country Singles chart and No. 9 in Canada on the RPM Country Singles chart.

== Recording ==
Recording sessions for the album began on April 7 and 8, 1971, at RCA Studio B in Nashville, Tennessee. Two additional sessions followed on September 28 and 30. "Her and the Car and the Mobile Home" was recorded on December 9, 1970, during a session for 1971's Two of a Kind.

== Track listing ==
Side one
No.	Title	Writer(s)	Recording date	Length
1.	"More Than Words Can Tell"	Porter Wagoner	April 8, 1971	2:44
2.	"The Right Combination"	Wagoner	April 7, 1971	2:52
3.	"I've Been This Way Too Long"	Dolly Parton	September 30, 1971	2:40
4.	"In Each Love Some Pain Must Fall"	Parton	April 8, 1971	2:04
5.	"Her and the Car and the Mobile Home"	Dave Kirby; Don Stock	December 9, 1970	2:37

Side two
No.	Title	Writer(s)	Recording date	Length
1.	"Burning the Midnight Oil"	Wagoner	April 7, 1971	1:45
2.	"Somewhere Along the Way"	Parton	September 28, 1971	3:06
3.	"On and On"	Eddie Sovine	April 7, 1971	2:03
4.	"Through Thick and Thin"	Bill Owens	September 30, 1971	2:01
5.	"The Fog Has Lifted"	Wagoner	September 28, 1971	2:18

== Personnel ==
Adapted from the album liner notes.

- David Briggs – piano
- Jerry Carrigan – drums
- Pete Drake – steel guitar
- Bobby Dyson – bass
- Bob Ferguson – producer
- Jack Hurst – liner notes
- Dave Kirby – electric guitar
- Les Leverett – cover photo
- Mack Magaha – fiddle
- George McCormick – rhythm guitar
- Al Pachucki – recording engineer
- Dolly Parton – lead vocals
- Hargus Robbins – piano
- Billy Sanford – rhythm guitar
- Roy Shockley – recording technician
- Jerry Shook – electric guitar
- Buddy Spicher – fiddle
- Jerry Stembridge – rhythm guitar
- Charles Trent – electric banjo
- Porter Wagoner – lead vocals

== Charts ==
Album

Chart (1972)	Peak position
US Hot Country LP's (Billboard)	6

Singles

Title	Year	Peak position		
Title	Year	US Country	US Bubbling	CAN Country
"The Right Combination"	1971	14	106	26
"Burning the Midnight Oil"	1971	11	—	9

== Release history ==
Region	Date	Format	Label	Ref.
Various	January 3, 1972	LP; 8-track; cassette	RCA Victor	
Various	January 4, 2019	Digital download	RCA; Sony; Legacy	
