= The Best of Porter Wagoner & Dolly Parton =

Compilation album by Porter Wagoner and Dolly Parton
- Released: July 19, 1971
- Recorded: October 11, 1967–December 14, 1970
- Studio: RCA Studio B (Nashville)
- Genre: Country
- Length: 24:19
- Label: RCA Victor
- Producer: Bob Ferguson

Porter Wagoner and Dolly Parton chronology
Two of a Kind (1971)	The Best of Porter Wagoner & Dolly Parton (1971)	The Right Combination • Burning the Midnight Oil (1972)

Dolly Parton chronology
Joshua (1971)	The Best of Porter Wagoner & Dolly Parton (1971)	Coat of Many Colors (1971)

Singles from The Best of Porter Wagoner & Dolly Parton
- 1. "Better Move It on Home" Released: January 26, 1971

The Best of Porter Wagoner & Dolly Parton is a compilation album by Porter Wagoner and Dolly Parton. It was released on July 19, 1971, by RCA Victor. The album contains tracks from each of their collaboration albums released up to that point, with the exception of 1969's Always, Always. The album included one previously unreleased track, the Grammy-nominated single, "Better Move It on Home".

== Critical reception ==
Professional ratings
Review scores
Source	Rating
AllMusic	3.5/5 stars
Christgau's Record Guide	B
The Encyclopedia of Popular Music	4/5 stars

The review in the July 31, 1971 issue of Billboard said, "This collection of the best performances by Porter Wagoner and Dolly Parton is sure to prove a blockbuster programming and sales item. Their top treatments of "Daddy Was an Old Time Preacher Man", "The Pain of Loving You", "The Last Thing on My Mind", and "Just Someone I Used to Know" are standouts."

Cashbox published a review in the July 24, 1971 issue which said, "One whole lot of sales power in this album from a duo that consistently hits the charts together and apart. The most recent hit here included is "Better Move It on Home" while other titles will be equally familiar to their large following: "Just Someone I Used to Know", "The Pain of Loving You", and "Holding on to Nothin'" just to mention a few. A musical marriage made in country heaven."

Reviewing in Christgau's Record Guide: Rock Albums of the Seventies, Robert Christgau wrote: "There are real pleasures here, but they're chiefly vocal. The surprises are few, the jokes weak and infrequent, the sentimentality overripe ("Jeanie's Afraid of the Dark", yeucch), and the best song's by Paxton, nor Parton. In short, a lousy ad for couple-bonding, though whether Porter is repressing Dolly or Dolly holding out on Porter I wouldn't know."

== Commercial performance ==
The album peaked at No. 7 on the US Billboard Hot Country LP's chart.

The album's single, "Better Move It on Home", was released in January 1971 and peaked at No. 7 on the US Billboard Hot Country Singles chart and No. 8 in Canada on the RPM Country Singles chart.

== Accolades ==
The album's single, "Better Move It on Home", was nominated for Best Country Vocal Performance by a Duo or Group at the 14th Annual Grammy Awards.

== Track listing ==
Side one
No.	Title	Writer(s)	Recording date	Length
1.	"Just Someone I Used to Know"	Jack Clement	April 21, 1969	2:21
2.	"Daddy Was an Old Time Preacher Man"	Dolly Parton; Dorothy Jo Hope	April 21, 1970	2:57
3.	"Tomorrow Is Forever"	Parton	December 2, 1969	2:45
4.	"Jeannie's Afraid of the Dark"	Parton	May 21, 1969	2:44
5.	"The Last Thing on My Mind"	Tom Paxton	October 11, 1967	2:34

Side two
No.	Title	Writer(s)	Recording date	Length
1.	"The Pain of Loving You"	Parton; Porter Wagoner	December 14, 1970	2:05
2.	"Better Move It on Home"	Ray Griff	December 14, 1970	2:14
3.	"Holding On to Nothin'"	Jerry Chesnut	January 31, 1968	2:26
4.	"Run That by Me One More Time"	Parton	December 3, 1969	2:18
5.	"We'll Get Ahead Someday"	Mack Magaha	May 22, 1968	1:55

== Personnel ==
Adapted from the album liner notes.

- Bob Ferguson – producer
- Les Leverett – cover photo
- Jim Malloy – recording engineer
- Al Pachucki – recording engineer
- Chuck Seitz – recording engineer
- Roy Shockley – recording technician
- Paul W. Soelberg – liner notes

== Charts ==
Album

Chart (1971)	Peak position
US Hot Country LP's (Billboard)	7

Singles

Title	Year	Peak position	
Title	Year	US Country	CAN Country
"Better Move It on Home"	1971	7	8

== Release history ==
Region	Date	Format	Label	Ref.
Various	July 19, 1971	LP; 8-track	RCA Victor	
