= Coat of Many Colors =

Studio album by Dolly Parton
- Released: October 4, 1971
- Recorded: October 30, 1969 – April 27, 1971
- Studios: RCA Studio B (Nashville, Tennessee)
- Genre: Country
- Length: 27:26
- Label: RCA Victor
- Producer: Bob Ferguson

Dolly Parton chronology
| The Best of Porter Wagoner & Dolly Parton (1971) | Coat of Many Colors (1971) | The Right Combination • Burning the Midnight Oil (1972) |

Singles from Coat of Many Colors
- 1. "My Blue Tears" Released: June 14, 1971; 2. "Coat of Many Colors" Released: September 21, 1971

Coat of Many Colors is the eighth solo studio album by American singer-songwriter Dolly Parton, released on October 4, 1971, by RCA Victor. Produced by Bob Ferguson, the album comprises ten tracks, seven written by Parton and three by her frequent musical collaborator Porter Wagoner. Recorded at RCA Studio B in Nashville, Tennessee, between October 1969 and April 1971, it draws on traditional country music, with elements of folk, gospel and country rock. The album marked an important stage in Parton's development as a songwriter and recording artist, allowing her to establish a musical identity distinct from her work with Wagoner.

The album's title track, an autobiographical account of Parton's childhood poverty and the coat her mother made for her from discarded fabric scraps, became one of her signature songs. Its themes of family, faith, dignity and acceptance have contributed to its enduring appeal. Other songs explore subjects including romantic relationships, rural life and personal hardship, demonstrating the range of Parton's songwriting. Two singles were released from the album: "My Blue Tears", which reached number 17 on the US Billboard Hot Country Singles chart, and the title track, which peaked at number 4. The album reached number 7 on Billboard's Hot Country LP's chart and received a nomination for Album of the Year at the 1972 Country Music Association Awards.

Coat of Many Colors received favorable reviews on release, with contemporary critics praising Parton's songwriting and vocal performances. It has subsequently been recognized as one of her most accomplished albums. In 1981, Robert Christgau awarded it an A− in his Record Guide, while retrospective assessments by publications including Rolling Stone have highlighted its songwriting and influence. The magazine ranked it number 257 on its 2020 list of the 500 Greatest Albums of All Time and number one on its 2022 list of the 100 Greatest Country Albums of All Time. Other accolades include its inclusion in Time magazine’s 2006 list of the 100 Greatest Albums of All Time and National Public Radio’s 2017 ranking of the 150 greatest albums made by women.

== Background ==
Dolly Parton grew up in the hills of East Tennessee as one of twelve children in a musical family. Her grandfather, Reverend Jake Owens, was a preacher and songwriter whose influence extended into her early musical development; Parton later recalled that her singing career began in his church when she was six years old. Her mother also encouraged her interest in music, and Parton began writing songs during childhood. By the time she moved to Nashville in 1964, she had already developed ambitions to pursue a career in country music.

Parton initially recorded for Monument Records, releasing her debut album, Hello, I'm Dolly, in 1967. That year, she joined the syndicated television program The Porter Wagoner Show, becoming Wagoner's duet partner. Their musical partnership brought her wider recognition, and RCA Records subsequently signed her as both a solo recording artist and a duet partner with Wagoner. Although their collaborations established her as a prominent figure in country music, Parton continued to develop her own songwriting and recording career.

Her solo career gained momentum in 1970 when her recording of Jimmie Rodgers' "Mule Skinner Blues (Blue Yodel No. 8)" reached number 3 on the Billboard country singles chart. The following year, her self-written single "Joshua" became her first number one country hit. By September 1971, Cash Box described her as an established television and recording performer, noting the success of both singles and the chart progress of "My Blue Tears". At the same time, she remained a featured performer on Wagoner's television program and continued to record and perform with him.

== Recording and production ==
Recording sessions for Coat of Many Colors took place at RCA Studio B in Nashville, Tennessee, between October 1969 and April 1971. The album was produced by Bob Ferguson, a staff producer at RCA Victor associated with the Nashville sound, who oversaw most of the duet albums Parton made with Porter Wagoner. Al Pachucki served as recording engineer and Roy Shockley as recording technician.

The album incorporated recordings from several sessions rather than being recorded entirely at once. "She Never Met a Man (She Didn't Like)" and "A Better Place to Live" were recorded on October 30, 1969, during sessions for the album The Fairest of Them All (1970), and "Early Morning Breeze" on January 26, 1971, during the sessions for the album Joshua. The remaining tracks were recorded during sessions on April 16 and 27, 1971. The April 16 session produced "My Blue Tears" and "Traveling Man", while the April 27 session included the title track, "If I Lose My Mind", "The Mystery of the Mystery", "The Way I See You" and "Here I Am".

The recording featured a group of established Nashville session musicians. Parton provided the lead vocals, accompanied by guitarists George McCormick, Dave Kirby, Jerry Shook and Billy Sanford, pianists David Briggs and Hargus "Pig" Robbins, and bassist Bobby Dyson. The rhythm section also included drummer Jerry Carrigan, while Pete Drake played steel guitar. Fiddle parts were contributed by Mack Magaha, Johnny Gimble and Buddy Spicher, with Buck Trent providing electric banjo. The Nashville Edition supplied backing vocals.

Although Ferguson received the album's production credit, Porter Wagoner continued to exert considerable influence over Parton's recording sessions. In a 2026 interview with Rolling Stone, Parton recalled that Wagoner was closely involved in production, working with the engineers and musicians and helping to determine how the recordings should sound. He also helped her select material for the album.

== Style, writing and composition ==
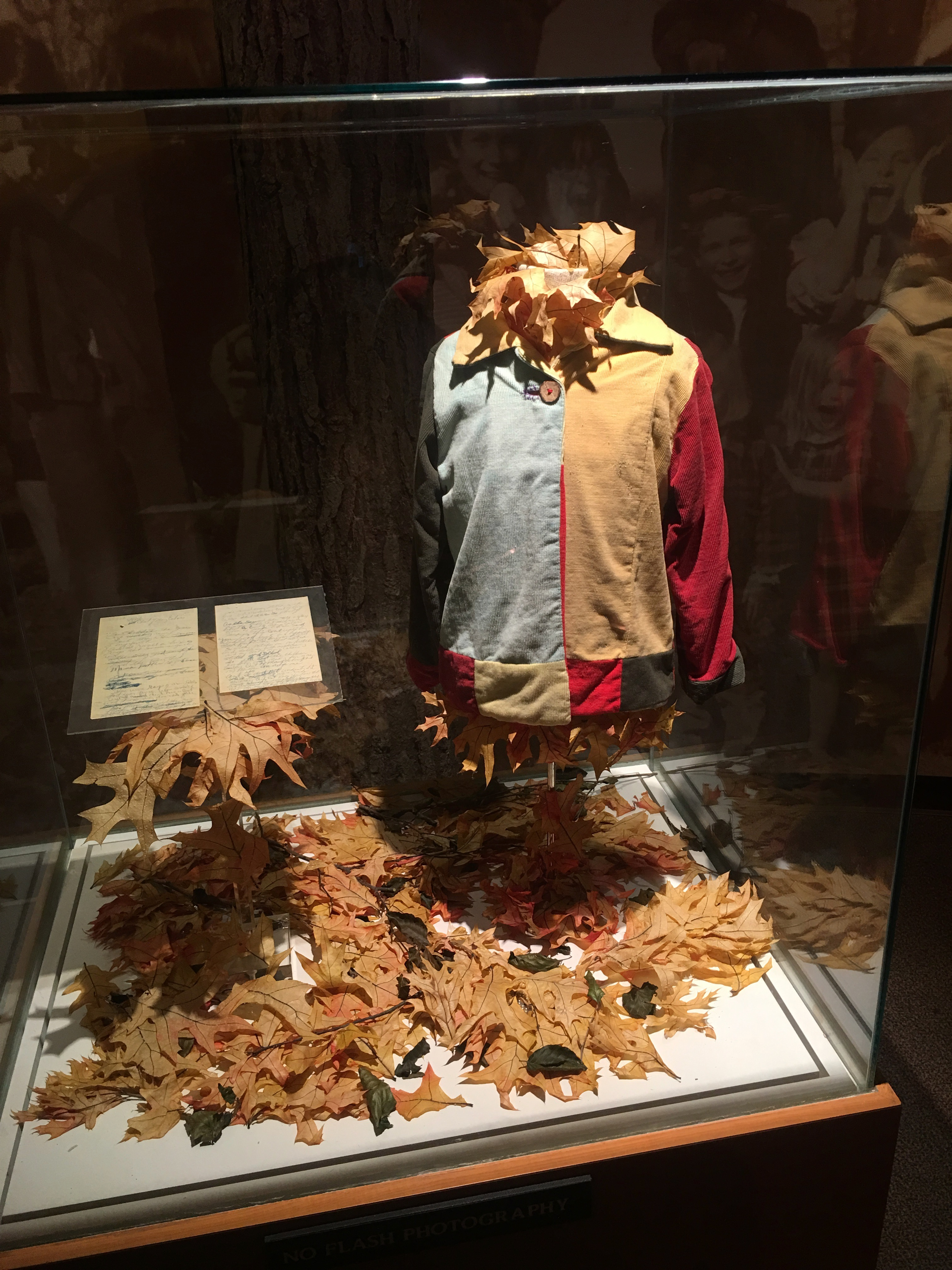
The "Coat of Many Colors" on display at the Chasing Rainbows museum at Dollywood.

Coat of Many Colors draws on several styles of country music, combining traditional country with elements of country rock, folk and gospel. In a retrospective assessment for Australian Rolling Stone, the album was described as encompassing hard edged country, pop gospel, country rock and folk, with songs exploring subjects including poverty, death, betrayal, romantic relationships and religion. The publication also regarded the album as an important step in establishing Parton as an individual artist rather than primarily as Porter Wagoner's television and recording partner.

Parton wrote seven of the album's ten songs, with the remaining three written by Wagoner. The material demonstrates her ability to approach different subjects and narrative perspectives, particularly through the use of autobiographical experiences and character driven storytelling. In a 2026 interview with Canadian Rolling Stone, Parton explained that she had wanted to develop as a songwriter while continuing to express herself musically. She regarded the album as an important opportunity to take greater control of her material, although Wagoner remained involved in the recording process and had requested that she include some of his compositions. Music journalist Chet Flippo subsequently described the album as the first significant flowering of Parton's development into an independent songwriter. In a 2020 interview with Pitchfork, Parton described the album as personal and loving, explaining that the title track's experiences of bullying and difference had resonated with listeners who had experienced similar treatment. She also recalled that the photograph used for the cover depicted her wearing the original coat made by her mother.

The title track is an autobiographical narrative based on Parton's childhood in rural Tennessee, recalling how her mother made her a coat from donated fabric scraps. The story incorporates the biblical account of Joseph and his coat of many colors, which Parton's mother used to help her daughter appreciate the garment. The song contrasts the child's pride in her mother's creation with the ridicule she experiences from her classmates, ultimately presenting familial love and personal dignity as more valuable than material possessions. Musicologist Nadine Hubbs, writing for the Library of Congress' National Recording Preservation Board, noted how the song combines its account of poverty with ideas of family, faith and cultural identity. She also highlighted its arrangement, which places Parton's lead vocal against a buoyant Nashville rhythm section, organ and layered backing harmonies. In a 2016 interview with the Library of Congress, Parton recalled that the song's lyrics came together while she was traveling on Wagoner's tour bus, where she used a dry cleaning tag from one of his outfits to write them down. She explained that writing the song helped her overcome the hurt associated with the childhood experience, turning it into a message of understanding and acceptance.

Parton's storytelling is particularly evident in the construction of the title track. Musicologist Lydia Hamessley observed that the song begins with the narrator looking back on her childhood before moving into the events surrounding the making of the coat. Its verses establish the narrative, while the chorus introduces the central distinction between material poverty and emotional wealth. The final chorus modifies the earlier wording to reinforce the song's message. Hamessley also noted that the restrained treatment of the bullying episode prevents the song from becoming overly sentimental, allowing the narrator's perspective and her mother's influence to remain central. Speaking to Rolling Stone in 2026, Parton identified the title track as the starting point for the album's development as a predominantly self written statement of her musical identity.

Other songs explore relationships and the experiences of people living in rural communities. "Traveling Man" tells the story of a young woman whose mother becomes involved with the traveling salesman whom her daughter had hoped to leave with. "She Never Met a Man (She Didn't Like)" similarly uses humor and characterization to examine romantic relationships. Parton's songwriting also draws on the landscape and traditions of her native Smoky Mountains. "Early Morning Breeze" evokes the natural surroundings of the region, while "My Blue Tears" uses bluegrass influenced musical elements and imagery from nature to express romantic disappointment. Music researcher James Barker, writing for The Conversation in 2021, discussed the contrasting approaches to songwriting across the album. He highlighted the comic treatment of sexuality in "Traveling Man", the pastoral imagery of "Early Morning Breeze" and "My Blue Tears", and the gospel influenced country arrangement of "Here I Am". Barker considered these songs examples of the development and refinement of Parton's songwriting.

== Release, promotion and commercial performance ==
The Dolly Parton official website documents the album's release as October 4, 1971 through RCA Victor. During September 1971 RCA announced a 67 album October release program, Coat of Many Colors was later advertised in Record World as part of this program, though no specific release date was mentioned. The first review of the album appeared in the October 9, 1971 edition of Cash Box.

During December 1971, RCA continued to promote the album through advertisements in the American music press. An advertisement in the December 4 issue of Billboard featured the album alongside Parton's contemporary industry rankings, including number 6 among female album vocalists on Billboard's album listing, number 3 in Record World and number 4 in Cash Box. The same ad ran in the following week's edition of Record World.

The album reached number 7 on Billboard's Hot Country LP's chart in the issue dated January 22, 1972, its thirteenth week on the listing. It also reached number 7 on Record World's Country Album Chart, and number 9 on Cash Box's Top Country Albums chart.

=== Singles ===
Two singles were released from the album:

- "My Blue Tears" was released in June 1971, to positive reviews in Billboard, Cash Box, and Record World. It peaked at number 17 on the Billboard Hot Country Singles chart, and number 4 on the Canadian RPM Country 50 Singles chart.
- "Coat of Many Colors" was released on September 21, 1971, and was praised in reviews for Cash Box, and Billboard. It peaked at number 4 on the Billboard Hot Country Singles chart, and number 15 on the Canadian RPM Country 50 Singles chart.

=== Re-recordings ===
Over the years, Parton would re-record a number of songs from the album:

- "Traveling Man" was re-recorded in April 1973 for Parton's Bubbling Over (1973) album.
- "Early Morning Breeze" was recorded again in December 1973 and included on the album Jolene (1974).
- "My Blue Tears" was re-recorded in 1978 with Emmylou Harris and Linda Ronstadt for a trio album project. The recording eventually surfaced on Ronstadt's album Get Closer (1982). Parton also cut the song for a third time, including it on her album Little Sparrow (2001).
- "Here I Am" was re-recorded as a duet with Sia for the 2018 soundtrack album Dumplin' (2018).

== Legacy ==
The title track has become one of Dolly Parton's best known songs and is regarded as one of her signature compositions. In 2011, the recording was inducted into the National Recording Registry by the Library of Congress, which described it as an autobiographical account of Parton's impoverished childhood in Tennessee, enriched by her family's love. The Library noted that the song helped establish her credibility as a songwriter and that Parton considered it her favorite of her compositions because of the attitude and philosophy it expressed. The recording was inducted into the Grammy Hall of Fame in 2019.

The song's story was subsequently adapted into other media. Dolly Parton's Coat of Many Colors, a television film dramatizing Parton's childhood, premiered on NBC on December 10, 2015. It attracted 13.03 million viewers in its initial broadcast and a total audience of 15.58 million after three days of delayed viewing, making it the most watched broadcast television film in more than six years. The production received the Academy of Country Music's Tex Ritter Film Award. A sequel, Dolly Parton's Christmas of Many Colors: Circle of Love, followed in November 2016. Parton also adapted the song into a children's picture book, published in October 2016. In an interview with the Library of Congress that year, she said teachers regularly told her they used the song to address bullying and help children understand self worth.

The song has also acquired significance among LGBTQ+ audiences. In a 2021 article for The Conversation music researcher James Barker argued that its progression from pride in the coat, through the shame caused by classmates' ridicule, to a renewed assertion of self worth resonates with the reclamation of shame in LGBTQ+ history and politics. He also drew attention to the visual similarities between the coat's different colors and the LGBTQ+ pride flag. Barker developed this interpretation further in a 2022 academic article, examining how the song's treatment of shame and personal identity allows LGBTQ+ listeners to find a sense of belonging within Parton's life story and country music more broadly.

Following Parton's death on August 25, 2026, the song experienced a substantial increase in streaming. According to data from music analytics company Luminate reported by the Associated Press, its US streams rose from 28,900 on the Monday before her death to 1.9 million on the Wednesday afterwards.

== Critical reception ==
Professional ratings
Review scores
| Source | Rating |
|---|---|
| AllMusic | 5/5 stars |
| Christgau's Record Guide | A− |
| The Encyclopedia of Popular Music | 4/5 stars |
| Music Box | 5/5 stars |
| Stylus Magazine | (A−) |
| Holler | 7.5/10 |

Coat of Many Colors received positive reviews upon its release. Cash Box, reviewing the album in October 1971, praised Parton's continuing improvement as a recording artist, highlighting the title track, "My Blue Tears" and "She Never Met a Man (She Didn't Like)", alongside three songs written by Porter Wagoner. The magazine predicted that the album would achieve considerable chart success. Billboard similarly praised the material, describing Parton as a leading country stylist and highlighting "My Blue Tears", "She Never Met a Man" and "The Way I See You". The magazine predicted that the album would become her biggest seller to date.

In his 1981 book Christgau's Record Guide: Rock Albums of the Seventies, Robert Christgau awarded the album an A−. He considered its first side exceptional, praising its opening two songs and comparing the unconventional subject matter of "If I Lose My Mind" and "The Mystery of the Mystery" with contemporary rock music. He was less enthusiastic about the second side, although he singled out "She Never Met a Man (She Didn't Like)" for particular praise.

Retrospective reviews have also been favorable. Stephen Thomas Erlewine of AllMusic awarded the album five stars, praising its consistent songwriting and performances, as well as the diversity of its material. He considered the album a demonstration of the full extent of Parton's talents, establishing her as a major artist in her own right rather than merely a duet partner. In a five star review for The Music Box in 2007, John Metzger described the album as a dark yet ultimately optimistic portrait, praising the maturity of Parton's songwriting and the emotional quality of her performances. He concluded that it remained the artistic pinnacle of her career.

Reviewing for Holler in 2021, Marcus K. Dowling considered the album an important milestone in Parton's development as a songwriter, arguing that it revealed the foundations of her subsequent career. He identified influences from country singers including Bobbie Gentry, Jeannie C. Riley, Loretta Lynn and Patsy Cline, while noting the contrasting musical styles across the record, which ranged from traditional country to gospel, country rock and folk. However, Dowling felt that the album lacked a consistent thematic direction and that some of its songs were less successful than others. He nevertheless regarded it as an essential recording in the development of Parton's artistic identity, awarding it 7.5 out of 10.

Rolling Stone included the album in its list of the 50 country albums every rock fan should own, originally published in 2014 and republished in 2020. The magazine highlighted the contrasting narratives of "Coat of Many Colors" and "Traveling Man", praising the album's ability to balance personal storytelling with more unconventional subject matter. In 2020, the magazine ranked the album number 257 on its list of the 500 Greatest Albums of All Time, describing it as Parton's starkest and most affecting album.

=== Accolades ===
The album was nominated for Album of the Year at the 1972 Country Music Association Awards. In 2003, Rolling Stone ranked it number 299 on its list of the 500 Greatest Albums of All Time, placing it at number 301 in the 2012 update, before moving it to number 257 in the 2020 revision. In 2006, Time included the album on its list of the 100 Greatest Albums of All Time. In 2017, National Public Radio ranked it number 11 on its list of the 150 greatest albums made by women.

In 2022, Rolling Stone ranked the album number one on its list of the 100 Greatest Country Albums of All Time. In 2025, MOJO ranked it number three on its list of Parton's ten greatest albums.

== Track listing ==
All tracks written by Dolly Parton, except where noted. Details adapted from original and reissued liner notes.

Side one
| No. | Title | Writer(s) | Recording date | Length |
|---|---|---|---|---|
| 1. | "Coat of Many Colors" | | April 27, 1971 | 3:05 |
| 2. | "Traveling Man" | | April 16, 1971 | 2:40 |
| 3. | "My Blue Tears" | | April 16, 1971 | 2:16 |
| 4. | "If I Lose My Mind" | Porter Wagoner | April 27, 1971 | 2:29 |
| 5. | "The Mystery of the Mystery" | Wagoner | April 27, 1971 | 2:28 |
| Total length: | | | | 12:58 |

Side two
| No. | Title | Writer(s) | Recording date | Length |
|---|---|---|---|---|
| 1. | "She Never Met a Man (She Didn't Like)" | | October 30, 1969 | 2:41 |
| 2. | "Early Morning Breeze" | | January 26, 1971 | 2:54 |
| 3. | "The Way I See You" | Wagoner | April 27, 1971 | 2:46 |
| 4. | "Here I Am" | | April 27, 1971 | 3:19 |
| 5. | "A Better Place to Live" | | October 30, 1969 | 2:39 |
| Total length: | | | | 14:19 |

2007 CD reissue bonus tracks
| No. | Title | Writer(s) | Recording date | Length |
|---|---|---|---|---|
| 11. | "My Heart Started Breaking" | | January 25, 1971 | 3:02 |
| 12. | "Just as Good as Gone" | | April 27, 1971 | 2:28 |
| 13. | "The Tender Touch of Love" | Wagoner | April 16, 1971 | 2:26 |
| 14. | "My Blue Tears" (Acoustic Demo) | | January 25, 1971 | 2:24 |
| Total length: | | | | 10:21 |

== Personnel ==
Adapted from the album liner notes.

- David Briggs – piano
- Jerry Carrigan – drums
- Pete Drake – steel
- Bobby Dyson – bass
- Bob Ferguson – producer
- Johnny Gimble – fiddle
- Dave Kirby – guitar
- Les Leverett – photograph of cover painting
- Mack Magaha – fiddle
- George McCormick – guitar
- The Nashville Edition – background vocals
- Al Pachucki – recording engineer
- Dolly Parton – lead vocals, liner notes
- Hargus Robbins – piano
- Billy Sanford – guitar
- Roy Shockley – recording technician
- Jerry Shook – guitar
- Buddy Spicher – fiddle
- Buck Trent – electric banjo

== Charts ==
Weekly album charts

| Chart (1972) | Peak position |
|---|---|
| US Hot Country LP's (Billboard) | 7 |
| US Country Album Chart (Record World) | 7 |
| US Top Country Albums (Cash Box) | 9 |

Year end album chart

| Chart (1972) | Peak position |
|---|---|
| US Hot Country LP's (Billboard) | 32 |

== Certifications ==
| Region | Certification | Certified units/sales |
|---|---|---|
| Australia (ARIA) | Gold | 35,000^{‡} |
^{‡} Sales+streaming figures based on certification alone.

== Release history ==
- October 4, 1971 - Original US RCA Victor release, on LP (LSP-4603), cassette (PK-1826), and 8 track cartridge.
- 1999 - CD reissue by Buddha Records (74465996422).
- 2007 - CD reissue by RCA Nashville (82876812422), included 4 bonus tracks.
- 2010 - Triple CD featuring Coat of Many Colors, My Tennessee mountain Home, Jolene by Sony Music (A774693).
- 2016 - Vinyl reissue by Music on Vinyl (MOVLP1443), original 10 songs only.
- 2021 - 50th anniversary LP released by VMP Country (CW006), original 10 songs only.
