= The Best of Dolly Parton =

Compilation album by Dolly Parton
- Released: November 9, 1970
- Recorded: December 18, 1967–May 12, 1970
- Studio: RCA Studio B (Nashville)
- Genre: Country
- Length: 30:52
- Label: RCA Victor
- Producer: Bob Ferguson

Dolly Parton chronology
| Once More (1970) | The Best of Dolly Parton (1970) | Two of a Kind (1971) |

Singles from The Best of Dolly Parton
- 1. "Mule Skinner Blues (Blue Yodel No. 8)" Released: June 22, 1970

The Best of Dolly Parton is a compilation album by American singer-songwriter Dolly Parton. It was released on November 9, 1970, by RCA Victor. The album was produced by Bob Ferguson. It includes some of Parton's early hits, a few non-single album tracks, and two previously unreleased tracks ("Mule Skinner Blues (Blue Yodel No. 8)" and "How Great Thou Art"). The album peaked at number 12 on the Billboard Top Country Albums chart. The single, "Mule Skinner Blues (Blue Yodel No. 8)" peaked at number three on the Billboard Hot Country Songs chart and earned Parton a nomination for Best Female Country Vocal Performance at the 13th Annual Grammy Awards. The album was certified Gold by the RIAA on June 12, 1978, for sales of 500,000 copies.

== Recording ==
Two previously unreleased songs were included on the album. "Mule Skinner Blues (Blue Yodel No. 8)" was the only song recorded at the May 4, 1970 session at RCA Studio B in Nashville. "How Great Thou Art" was recorded on May 12, 1970, during the second of three sessions for what would be Parton's 1971 album The Golden Streets of Glory.

== Release and promotion ==
The album was released November 9, 1970, on LP.

=== Singles ===
The album's single, "Mule Skinner Blues (Blue Yodel No. 8)", was released in June 1970 and peaked at number three on the US Billboard Hot Country Songs chart and number 4 in Canada on the RPM Country Singles chart.

== Critical reception ==
Professional ratings
Review scores
| Source | Rating |
|---|---|
| AllMusic | 4.5/5 stars |
| Christgau's Record Guide | A |

The review published in the November 21, 1970 issue of Billboard said, "This LP teams with big hits, including "Mule Skinner Blues", "In the Good Old Days (When Times Were Bad)", and "Just Because I'm a Woman". Every tune is packed with that special emotion only Dolly Parton can render in a song. "Down from Dover" is a real tearjerker."

Cashbox published a review in the November 14, 1970 issue which said, "It becomes difficult to choose the selections for a best hits album for Dolly, because almost everything she's recorded has been a hit! Nevertheless, this new album is just a small sampling of the enormous talent she has. "Mule Skinner Blues", "Down from Dover", "Gypsy, Joe and Me", "In the Ghetto", "Just Because I'm a Woman", "How Great Thou Art," and "Just the Way I Am" are included."

AllMusic gave the album 4.5 out of 5 stars.

== Commercial performance ==
The album peaked at number 12 on the US Billboard Top Country Albums chart.

== Accolades ==
Parton earned her first solo Grammy nomination for "Mule Skinner Blues (Blue Yodel No. 8)". It was nominated for Best Female Country Vocal Performance at the 13th Annual Grammy Awards.

Awards and nominations received for The Best of Dolly Parton
| Award | Year | Category | Nominee/work | Result |
|---|---|---|---|---|
| Grammy Awards | 1971 | Best Female Country Vocal Performance | "Mule Skinner Blues (Blue Yodel No. 8)" | Nominated |

== Track listing ==
All songs written by Dolly Parton, except where noted.

Side one
| No. | Title | Writer(s) | Recording date | Length |
|---|---|---|---|---|
| 1. | "Mule Skinner Blues (Blue Yodel No. 8)" | Jimmie Rodgers; George Vaughan | May 4, 1970 | 3:10 |
| 2. | "Down from Dover" (from The Fairest of Them All) | | September 4, 1969 | 3:42 |
| 3. | "My Blue Ridge Mountain Boy" (from My Blue Ridge Mountain Boy) | | May 20, 1969 | 3:27 |
| 4. | "In the Good Old Days (When Times Were Bad)" (from In the Good Old Days (When Times Were Bad)) | | September 9, 1968 | 2:46 |
| 5. | "Gypsy, Joe and Me" (from My Blue Ridge Mountain Boy) | | May 21, 1969 | 3:07 |

Side two
| No. | Title | Writer(s) | Recording date | Length |
|---|---|---|---|---|
| 1. | "In the Ghetto" (from My Blue Ridge Mountain Boy) | Mac Davis | June 2, 1969 | 2:46 |
| 2. | "Just Because I'm a Woman" (from Just Because I'm a Woman) | | December 18, 1967 | 3:01 |
| 3. | "Daddy Come and Get Me" (from The Fairest of Them All) | Parton; Dorothy Jo Hope | October 31, 1969 | 2:59 |
| 4. | "How Great Thou Art" | Stuart K. Hine | May 12, 1970 | 3:27 |
| 5. | "Just the Way I Am" (from The Fairest of Them All) | | October 31, 1969 | 2:27 |

== Personnel ==
Adapted from the album liner notes and RCA recording session records.

- Joseph Babcock – background vocals
- David Briggs – piano
- Jerry Carrigan – drums
- Anita Carter – background vocals
- Fred Carter Jr. – guitar
- Pete Drake – steel
- Dolores Edgin – background vocals
- Bob Ferguson – producer
- Lloyd Green – steel
- Junior Huskey – bass
- James Isbell – drums
- Les Leverett – cover photo
- Mack Magaha – fiddle
- George McCormick – rhythm guitar
- Wayne Moss – guitar
- Al Pachucki – recording engineer
- June Page – background vocals
- Dolly Parton – lead vocals
- Hargus Robbins – piano
- Roy Shockley – recording technician
- Bob Simpson – remastering
- Jerry Stembridge – guitar
- Buck Trent – electric banjo
- Bill Vandevort – recording technician
- Porter Wagoner – liner notes

== Charts ==
Chart performance for The Best of Dolly Parton
| Chart (1970) | Peak position |
|---|---|
| US Top Country Albums (Billboard) | 12 |
| US Cashbox Country Albums | 8 |

== Certifications ==
| Region | Certification | Certified units/sales |
|---|---|---|
| Australia (ARIA) | Gold | 35,000^{‡} |
| United States (RIAA) | Gold | 500,000^{^} |
^{^} Shipments figures based on certification alone.^{‡} Sales+streaming figures based on certification alone.
