= Two of a Kind (Porter Wagoner and Dolly Parton album) =

Studio album by Porter Wagoner and Dolly Parton
- Released: February 8, 1971
- Recorded: May 6–December 14, 1970
- Studio: RCA Studio B (Nashville)
- Genre: Country
- Length: 25:50
- Label: RCA Victor
- Producer: Bob Ferguson

Porter Wagoner and Dolly Parton chronology
Once More (1970)	Two of a Kind (1971)	The Best of Porter Wagoner & Dolly Parton (1971)

Dolly Parton chronology
The Best of Dolly Parton (1970)	Two of a Kind (1971)	The Golden Streets of Glory (1971)

Two of a Kind is the sixth collaborative studio album by Porter Wagoner and Dolly Parton. It was released on February 8, 1971, by RCA Victor. The album was produced by Bob Ferguson. It peaked at number 13 on the Billboard Top Country Albums chart and number 142 on the Billboard 200 chart. No singles were released from the album, but "Oh, the Pain of Loving You" was included as the B-side of the 1971 single "The Right Combination". It was released just one week before Parton's follow up solo album The Golden Streets of Glory.

== Content ==
"Curse of the Wild Weed Flower" is of note for being an anti-marijuana song, one of the few country songs of the period to discuss drugs. While no singles were released from the album, "Oh, the Pain of Loving You" was included as the B-side of the 1971 single "The Right Combination", with "Oh" being dropped from the song's title. Parton would later re-recorded the song under this abbreviated title with Linda Ronstadt and Emmylou Harris as part of their 1987 album Trio. The song's title was further abbreviated to "Pain of Lovin' You" when it was recorded by The Grascals (featuring Parton) in 2011 for their album Country Classics with a Bluegrass Spin. The album's liner notes were written by Don Howser, longtime announcer on The Porter Wagoner Show.

== Critical reception ==
Professional ratings
Review scores
Source	Rating
AllMusic	4/5 stars
The Encyclopedia of Popular Music	3/5 stars

The review published in the February 20, 1971 issue of Billboard said, "The highly successful country duo comes up with another LP destined for top programming and sales, and should soon be riding at the top of the charts. They turned in first-rate performances of "Two of a Kind", The Fighting Kind", "Oh, the Pain of Loving You" and "Curse of the Wild Weed Flower", among others."

Cashbox published a review in the issue dated February 13, which said, "Having already won just about every award possible for a vocal duo, Porter Wagoner and Dolly Parton, certainly "Two of a Kind", are back on the right track again with their first LP release of the new year. Porter and Dolly are capable of delivering soft, moody ballads, or up-tempo rockers with the utmost of sincerity and smoothness. Among the more outstanding tracks are "Oh, the Pain of Loving You", "Is It Real", "Today, Tomorrow and Forever", and the title track, "Two of a Kind", but the entire album is a classic and will be one of their biggest ever."

== Commercial performance ==
The album peaked at number 13 on the Billboard Top Country Albums chart and number 142 on the Billboard 200.

== Reissues ==
The album was reissued on CD in 2008 with 1969's Always, Always. It was released as a digital download on November 2, 2010. The album was included in the 2014 box set Just Between You and Me: The Complete Recordings, 1967–1976.

== Recording ==
Recording sessions for the album began at RCA Studio B in Nashville, Tennessee, on December 2, 1970. Three additional sessions followed on December 8, 9 and 14. "There'll Be Love" was recorded on May 6 during a session for 1970's Once More.

== Track listing ==
Side one
No.	Title	Writer(s)	Recording date	Length
1.	"Oh, the Pain of Loving You"	Dolly Parton; Porter Wagoner	December 14, 1970	2:05
2.	"Possum Holler"	Dallas Frazier	December 2, 1970	2:14
3.	"Is It Real?"	Parton	December 9, 1970	2:51
4.	"The Flame"	Parton	December 9, 1970	2:54
5.	"The Fighting Kind"	Parton	December 2, 1970	2:30

Side two
No.	Title	Writer(s)	Recording date	Length
1.	"Two of a Kind"	Parton; Wagoner	December 14, 1970	2:35
2.	"All I Need Is You"	Betty Jean Robinson	December 8, 1970	3:06
3.	"Curse of the Wild Weed Flower"	Parton; Louis Owens	December 8, 1970	2:20
4.	"Today, Tomorrow and Forever"	Bill Owens	December 8, 1970	2:40
5.	"There'll Be Love"	Parton; Wagoner	May 6, 1970	2:35

== Personnel ==
Adapted from the album liner notes and RCA recording session records.

- Joseph Babcock – background vocals
- Glenn Baxter – trumpet
- Jerry Carrigan – drums
- Pete Drake – steel
- Bobby Dyson – bass
- Dolores Edgin – background vocals
- Bob Ferguson – producer
- Johnny Gimble – fiddle
- Don Howser – liner notes
- Dave Kirby – guitar
- Les Leverett – cover photo
- Mack Magaha – fiddle, mandolin
- George McCormick – rhythm guitar
- Al Pachucki – recording engineer
- June Evelyn Page – background vocals
- Dolly Parton – lead vocals
- Hargus Robbins – piano
- Dale Sellers – guitar
- Donald Sheffield – trumpet
- Roy Shockley – recording technician
- Jerry Smith – piano
- Buddy Spicher – fiddle
- Buck Trent – banjo
- Porter Wagoner – lead vocals

== Charts ==
Chart performance for Two of a Kind
Chart (1971)	Peak position
US Billboard 200	142
US Top Country Albums (Billboard)	13

== Release history ==
Release dates and formats for Two of a Kind
Region	Date	Format	Title	Label	Ref.
Various	February 8, 1971	LP; 8-track	Two of a Kind	RCA Victor	
United States	February 12, 2008	CD	Always, Always / Two of a Kind	American Beat	
Various	November 2, 2010	Digital download	Two of a Kind	Sony; Legacy	
