= Just the Two of Us (Porter Wagoner and Dolly Parton album) =

Studio album by Porter Wagoner and Dolly Parton
- Released: September 9, 1968
- Recorded: January 31–May 22, 1968
- Studio: RCA Studio B (Nashville)
- Genre: Country
- Length: 28:39
- Label: RCA Victor
- Producer: Bob Ferguson

Porter Wagoner and Dolly Parton chronology
Just Between You And Me (1968)	Just the Two of Us (1968)	Always, Always (1969)

Dolly Parton chronology
Just Because I'm a Woman (1968)	Just the Two of Us (1968)	In the Good Old Days (When Times Were Bad) (1969)

Singles from Just the Two of Us
- 1. "Holding on to Nothin'" Released: March 11, 1968; 2. "We'll Get Ahead Someday" Released: July 1, 1968; 3. "Jeannie's Afraid of the Dark" Released: September 16, 1968

Just the Two of Us is the second collaborative studio album by Porter Wagoner and Dolly Parton. It was released on September 9, 1968, by RCA Victor. The album was produced by Bob Ferguson. It peaked at number five on the Billboard Top Country Albums chart and number 184 on the Billboard 200 chart. The album spawned three singles. "Holding on to Nothin'" and "We'll Get Ahead Someday" were top ten hits on the Billboard Hot Country Songs chart, peaking at numbers seven and five, respectively. The third single, "Jeannie's Afraid of the Dark", peaked at number 51.

== Recording ==
Recording sessions for the album took place at RCA Studio B in Nashville, Tennessee, beginning on January 31, 1968. Three additional sessions followed on May 20, 21 and 22.

== Release and promotion ==
The album was released September 9, 1968, on LP.

=== Singles ===
The album's first single, "Holding on to Nothin'", was released in March 1968 and debuted at number 60 on the Billboard Hot Country Songs chart dated April 13. It peaked at number seven on the chart dated June 1, its seventh week on the chart. It charted for 16 weeks. It also peaked at number 17 in Canada on the RPM Country Singles chart. "We'll Get Ahead Someday" was released as the second single in July and debuted at number 68 on the Billboard Hot Country Songs chart dated July 27. It peaked at number five on the chart dated September 28, its tenth week on the chart. The single charted for 13 weeks. The third single, "Jeannie's Afraid of the Dark", was released in September and debuted at number 66 on the Billboard Hot Country Songs chart dated October 5. It peaked at number 51 on the chart dated November 2. It charted for six weeks.

== Critical reception ==
Professional ratings
Review scores
Source	Rating
AllMusic	2.5/5 stars
The Encyclopedia of Popular Music	4/5 stars

Billboard published a review of the album in the September 21, 1968 issue, which said, "Wagoner and Parton have proved a hot sales combination for the singles charts, and their second LP built around their singles hits, "Holding on to Nothin'", "The Dark End of the Street", and "We'll Get Ahead Someday", is sure to prove a hot piece of album product."

Cashbox published a review of the album also, saying, "After scoring excellent success with their initial duet LP, as well as with several singles, Porter Wagoner and Dolly Parton launch their second album on the heels of their latest single, "Holding on to Nothin'". Kicking off the set with that track, the twosome also make a winning combination with such additional tracks as "The Dark End of the Street" and "I Washed My Face in the Morning Dew", among others."

AllMusic gave the album 2.5 out of 5 stars.

== Commercial performance ==
The album debuted at number 41 on the Billboard Top Country Albums chart dated October 5, 1968. It peaked at number five on the chart dated April 5, 1969, its 27th week on the chart. The album charted for a total of 49 weeks.

== Reissues ==
The album was included in the 2014 box set Just Between You and Me: The Complete Recordings, 1967–1976, marking the first time it had been reissued since its original release. The album was released as a digital download on August 17, 2018.

== Track listing ==
Side one
No.	Title	Writer(s)	Recording date	Length
1.	"Closer by the Hour"	Al Gore	May 20, 1968	2:15
2.	"I Washed My Face in the Morning Dew"	Tom T. Hall	May 21, 1968	2:45
3.	"Jeannie's Afraid of the Dark"	Dolly Parton	May 21, 1968	2:44
4.	"Holding on to Nothin'"	Jerry Chesnut	January 31, 1968	2:26
5.	"Slip Away Today"	Curly Putman	January 31, 1968	2:37
6.	"The Dark End of the Street"	Dan Penn; Chips Moman	May 22, 1968	2:15

Side two
No.	Title	Writer(s)	Recording date	Length
1.	"Just the Two of Us"	Chesnut	May 20, 1968	2:36
2.	"Afraid to Love Again"	Chesnut; Theresa Beaty	May 20, 1968	1:53
3.	"We'll Get Ahead Someday"	Mack Magaha	May 22, 1968	1:55
4.	"Somewhere Between"	Merle Haggard	May 22, 1968	2:13
5.	"The Party"	Parton	May 21, 1968	2:54
6.	"I Can"	Parton	May 21, 1968	2:06

== Personnel ==
Adapted from the album liner notes and RCA recording session records.

- Jerry Carrigan – drums
- Anita Carter – backing vocals
- Pete Drake – steel
- Dolores Edgin – backing vocals
- Bob Ferguson – producer, liner notes
- Roy M. Huskey, Jr. – bass
- Mack Magaha – fiddle
- George McCormick – rhythm guitar
- Wayne Moss – electric guitar
- Al Pachucki – recording engineer
- Dolly Parton – lead vocals
- Hargus Robbins – piano
- Jerry Stembridge – electric guitar
- Buck Trent – banjo
- Porter Wagoner – lead vocals

== Charts ==
Chart performance for Just the Two of Us
Chart (1968–1969)	Peak position
US Billboard 200	184
US Top Country Albums (Billboard)	5

== Release history ==
Release dates and formats for Just the Two of Us
Region	Date	Format	Label	Ref.
Various	September 9, 1968	LP	RCA Victor	
Various	August 17, 2018	Digital download	Sony; Legacy	
