= Always, Always =

1969 Porter Wagoner and Dolly Parton album

Studio album by Porter Wagoner and Dolly Parton
- Released: June 30, 1969
- Recorded: December 3, 1968–April 23, 1969
- Studio: RCA Studio B (Nashville)
- Genre: Country
- Length: 28:27
- Label: RCA Victor
- Producer: Bob Ferguson

Porter Wagoner and Dolly Parton chronology
Just the Two of Us (1968)	Always, Always (1969)	Porter Wayne and Dolly Rebecca (1970)

Dolly Parton chronology
In the Good Old Days (When Times Were Bad) (1969)	Always, Always (1969)	My Blue Ridge Mountain Boy (1969)

Singles from Always, Always
- 1. "Yours Love" Released: February 3, 1969; 2. "Always, Always" Released: May 19, 1969

Always, Always is the third collaborative studio album by Porter Wagoner and Dolly Parton. It was released on June 30, 1969, by RCA Victor. The album was produced by Bob Ferguson. It peaked at number five on the Billboard Top Country Albums chart and number 162 on the Billboard 200 chart. "Yours Love" and the album's title track were released as singles, peaking at numbers nine and 16, respectively.

== Recording ==
Recording sessions for the album took place at RCA Studio B in Nashville, Tennessee, on December 3 and 20, 1968. Three additional sessions followed on April 21, 22 and 23, 1969.

== Release and promotion ==
The album was released June 30, 1969, on LP and 8-track.

=== Singles ===
The album's first single, "Yours Love", was released in February 1969 and debuted at number 39 on the Billboard Hot Country Songs chart. It peaked at number nine on the chart dated May 10, its tenth week on the chart. It charted for 14 weeks. The second single, "Always, Always", was released in May 1969 and debuted at number 60 on the Billboard Hot Country Songs chart dated June 21. It peaked at number 16 on the chart dated July 26, its sixth week on the chart. The single spent 11 weeks on the chart.

== Critical reception ==
Professional ratings
Review scores
Source	Rating
AllMusic	3/5 stars
The Encyclopedia of Popular Music	3/5 stars

The review in the July 12, 1969 issue of Billboard said, "In the tradition of the country duet, you would have to see far to find another as polished and professional as Porter Wagoner and Dolly Parton—and few of those would be as successful. Here's their hit "Always, Always", and the impactful "Yours Love". Also recommended: "I Don't Believe You've Met My Baby"."

Cashbox published a review which said, "Titled after their latest single, this talented twosome offer a powerful package loaded with listening and sales appeal. Set contains twelve oldies and newies, including "Milwaukee, Here I Come", "Why Don't You haul Off & Love Me", "There Never Was a Time", "No Reason to Hurry Home", and "Anything's Better Than Nothing". Expect instant action on this one."

AllMusic rated the album 3 out of 5 stars.

== Commercial performance ==
The album debuted at number 35 on the Billboard Top Country Albums chart dated August 2, 1969. It peaked at number five on the chart dated September 19, its eighth week on the chart. It spent a total of 27 weeks on the chart. The album also peaked at number 162 on the Billboard Top LPs chart.

== Reissues ==
The album was reissued on CD with 1971's Two of a Kind in 2008. It was released as a digital download on November 2, 2010. The album was included in the 2014 box set Just Between You and Me: The Complete Recordings, 1967–1976.

== Track listing ==
Side one
No.	Title	Writer(s)	Recording date	Length
1.	"Milwaukee, Here I Come"	Lee Fikes	April 21, 1969	2:12
2.	"Yours Love"	Harlan Howard	December 20, 1968	2:23
3.	"I Don't Believe You've Met My Baby"	Autry Inman	April 22, 1969	2:11
4.	"Malena"	Dolly Parton	December 3, 1968	2:21
5.	"The House Where Love Lives"	Leona Reese	April 21, 1969	2:00
6.	"Why Don't You Haul Off & Love Me"	Wayne Raney; Lonnie Glosson	April 22, 1969	1:50

Side two
No.	Title	Writer(s)	Recording date	Length
1.	"Always, Always"	Joyce McCord	April 23, 1969	2:35
2.	"There Never Was a Time"	Myra Smith; Margaret Lewis	April 23, 1969	2:25
3.	"Good As Gold"	Paul Martin	December 20, 1968	2:20
4.	"My Hands Are Tied"	Parton	April 23, 1969	2:31
5.	"No Reason to Hurry Home"	Parton	April 21, 1969	2:24
6.	"Anything's Better Than Nothing"	Marie Wilson	April 23, 1969	2:11

== Personnel ==
Adapted from the album liner notes and RCA recording session records.

- Jean Alrshuler – harp
- Joseph Babcock – backing vocals
- Glenn Baxter – trumpet
- David Briggs – piano
- Jerry Carrigan – drums
- Anita Carter – backing vocals
- Bobby Dyson – bass
- Dolores Edgin – backing vocals
- Bob Ferguson – producer
- Lloyd Green – steel
- Roy M. Huskey, Jr. – bass
- Little Jack Little – liner notes
- Mack Magaha – fiddle, liner notes
- George McCormick – rhythm guitar, liner notes
- Bill McElhiney – trumpet
- Wayne Moss – guitar
- Al Pachucki – recording engineer
- June Evelyn Page – backing vocals
- Dolly Parton – lead vocals
- Hargus Robbins – piano
- Speck Rhodes – liner notes
- Roy M. Shockley – recording technician
- Jerry Stembridge – electric guitar
- Buck Trent – banjo, liner notes
- Porter Wagoner – lead vocals
- Don Warden – liner notes
- Hurshel Wiginton – backing vocals

== Charts ==
Chart performance for Always, Always
Chart (1969)	Peak position
US Billboard 200	162
US Top Country Albums (Billboard)	5

== Release history ==
Release dates and formats for Always, Always
Region	Date	Format	Title	Label	Ref.
Various	June 30, 1969	LP; 8-track	Always, Always	RCA Victor	
United States	February 12, 2008	CD	Always, Always / Two of a Kind	American Beat	
Various	November 2, 2010	Digital download	Always, Always	Sony; Legacy	
