= The Carroll County Accident (album) =

Studio album by Porter Wagoner
- Released: 1969
- Genre: Country
- Length: 27:37
- Label: RCA Victor

Porter Wagoner chronology
Just the Two of Us (1968)	The Carroll County Accident (1969)	Always, Always (1969)

The Carroll County Accident is a studio album by country music singer Porter Wagoner. It was released in 1969 by RCA Victor (catalog no. LSP-4116).

The album debuted on Billboard magazine's Top Country Albums chart on March 1, 1969, peaked at No. 4, and remained on the chart for a total of 28 weeks. The album included the No. 2 hit, "The Carroll County Accident".

AllMusic gave the album a rating of three stars.

== Track listing ==
Side A

1. "The World Needs a Washin'"
2. "Banks of the Ohio"
3. "Sing Me Back Home"
4. "Barefoot Nellie"
5. "Sorrow Overtakes the Wine"
6. "Black Jack's Bar"

Side B

1. "The Carroll County Accident"
2. "Rocky Top"
3. "Your Mother's Eyes"
4. "King of the Cannon County Hills"
5. "I Lived So Fast and Hard"
6. "Fallen Leaves"
