= The Carroll County Accident =

Single by Porter Wagoner

from the album The Carroll County Accident
- B-side: "Sorrow Overtakes the Wine"
- Released: October 1968
- Recorded: September 18, 1968
- Studio: RCA Victor Studio, Nashville, Tennessee
- Genre: Country
- Length: 2:48
- Label: RCA Victor
- Songwriter: Bob Ferguson
- Producer: Bob Ferguson

Porter Wagoner singles chronology
| "Jeannie's Afraid of the Dark" (1968) | "The Carroll County Accident" (1968) | "Yours Love" (1969) |

"The Carroll County Accident" is a 1968 country song written by Bob Ferguson, and recorded by Porter Wagoner that year. It was a hit for Wagoner and became one of his signature songs. "The Carroll County Accident" won CMA's Song of the Year in 1969. It has been covered by numerous musicians.

== Composition ==
The singer tells the story of a single-car accident that occurred near his hometown. The passenger, Walter Browning, an upstanding member of the community and seemingly happily married man, dies; while the driver, Mary Ellen Jones, a woman not his wife but also well respected, survives to testify that she was taking him to town on an errand of mercy.

The narrator singer describes examining the wreckage and discovering evidence of an extramarital affair between the two (Browning's wedding band hidden in a matchbox behind the dash). He disposes of the evidence and swears himself to silence for the sake of their reputations in the county; because, as he reveals in the last verse, Walter Browning was his father.

Because there are thirteen states in the United States which contain a Carroll County, the apparent specificity of the named location is offset by its ambiguity. According to an interview that Bob Ferguson gave to Steve Eng for his Porter Wagoner biography, A Satisfied Mind, Ferguson wrote the song while driving from Nashville, Tennessee to a concert for Choctaw Indians in Philadelphia, Mississippi. He recounted that he passed a sign for Carroll County, Tennessee, which inspired the song's title, and by the time he saw a sign for Carroll County, Mississippi, the song was a finished work.

== Covers ==
Wagoner's frequent musical collaborator Dolly Parton covered "The Carroll County Accident" in 1969, including it on her In the Good Old Days (When Times Were Bad) album.

== Chart performance ==
The song reached number 2 on Billboard's Hot Country Songs and number 92 on the Billboard Hot 100.

| Chart (1969) | Peak position |
|---|---|
| U.S. Billboard Hot Country Singles | 2 |
| U.S. Billboard Hot 100 | 92 |
| Canadian RPM Country Tracks | 1 |
| Canadian RPM Top Singles | 80 |
