= In the Good Old Days (When Times Were Bad) =

Studio album by Dolly Parton
- Released: February 3, 1969
- Recorded: September 9–October 9, 1968
- Studio: RCA Studio B (Nashville)
- Genre: Country
- Length: 29:00
- Label: RCA Victor
- Producer: Bob Ferguson

Dolly Parton chronology
Just the Two of Us (1968)	In the Good Old Days (When Times Were Bad) (1969)	Always, Always (1969)

Singles from In the Good Old Days (When Times Were Bad)
- 1. "In the Good Old Days (When Times Were Bad)" Released: October 14, 1968

In the Good Old Days (When Times Were Bad) is the third solo studio album by American singer-songwriter Dolly Parton. It was released on February 3, 1969, by RCA Victor. The album was produced by Bob Ferguson. It peaked at number 15 on the Billboard Top Country Albums chart. The album's title track was the only single released and it peaked at number 25 on the Billboard Hot Country Songs chart.

== Recording ==
Recording sessions for the album began at RCA Studio B in Nashville, Tennessee, on September 9 and 10, 1968. One additional session followed on October 9.

== Content ==
This was the first album where she wrote half the songs. In the title song, Parton looks back on her impoverished upbringing, concluding that while she values the lessons it taught her, she would not want to go back. The humorous "He's a Go Getter" plays on an unexpected pun, "When his wife gets off from work, he'll go get 'er." Parton also covers the Jeannie C. Riley hit "Harper Valley PTA", Tammy Wynette's "D-I-V-O-R-C-E", and Porter Wagoner's hit, "The Carroll County Accident".

Parton re-recorded the title song for her 1973 album My Tennessee Mountain Home.

Parton re-recorded "The Carroll County Accident" with Buck Trent for his 2018 album Spartanburg Blues.

== Release and promotion ==
The album was released February 3, 1969, on LP and 8-track.

=== Singles ===
The album's only single, "In the Good Old Days (When Times Were Bad)", was released in October 1968 and debuted at number 54 on the Billboard Hot Country Songs chart dated November 16. It peaked at number 25 on the chart dated December 21, its sixth week on the chart. It charted for a total of 11 weeks.

== Critical reception ==
Professional ratings
Review scores
Source	Rating
AllMusic	3.5/5 stars

The review published in the February 15, 1969 issue of Billboard said, "Without doubt this will be a big hit LP for Dolly Parton... just as it will be considered a great package of entertainment by her friends. The key to the LP is her empathy on "In the Good Old Days (When Times Were Bad)", but also she tugs the heartstrings on "D-I-V-O-R-C-E" and gets through to the emotion on "The Carrol County Accident"."

Cashbox published a review of the album, saying that, "Gaining in strength as one of the more popular country female artists, Dolly Parton follows up her chart single of "In the Good Old Days (When Times Were Bad)" with a strong LP that should solidify her position with the disk buyers. In addition to her own hit single, the LP features such monster titles as "D-I-V-O-R-C-E" and "Harper Valley PTA", among others."

AllMusic rated the album 3.5 out of 5 stars.

On a list of the top 50 Dolly Parton songs, Rolling Stone magazine listed the title track at number 28, citing that "this marked the first time on record that the songwriter addressed her hardscrabble Smoky Mountain childhood head-on."

== Commercial performance ==
The album debuted at number 35 on the Billboard Top Country Albums chart dated March 1, 1969. It peaked at number 15 on the chart dated March 29, its fifth week on the chart, where it remained for two weeks. It charted for a total of 11 weeks.

== Reissues ==
The album was reissued on cassette in Germany in 1987 and CD in Portugal in 1997. It was released as a digital download on July 26, 2019.

== Track listing ==
All tracks written by Dolly Parton, except where noted.

Side one
No.	Title	Writer(s)	Recording date	Length
1.	"Don't Let It Trouble Your Mind"		October 9, 1968	2:12
2.	"He's a Go-Getter"		October 9, 1968	2:03
3.	"In the Good Old Days (When Times Were Bad)"		September 9, 1968	2:45
4.	"It's My Time"	John D. Loudermilk	September 10, 1968	2:37
5.	"Harper Valley PTA"	Tom T. Hall	September 9, 1968	3:10
6.	"Little Bird"		September 10, 1968	1:44

Side two
No.	Title	Writer(s)	Recording date	Length
1.	"Mine"		October 9, 1968	2:03
2.	"The Carroll County Accident"	Bob Ferguson	October 9, 1968	2:56
3.	"Fresh Out of Forgiveness"	Bill Owens; Gene Gill	October 9, 1968	2:01
4.	"Mama, Say a Prayer"		October 9, 1968	2:45
5.	"Always the First Time"	Joyce McCord	September 9, 1968	2:01
6.	"D-I-V-O-R-C-E"	Bobby Braddock; Curly Putman	September 10, 1968	2:43

== Personnel ==
Adapted from the album liner notes and RCA recording session records.

- Joseph Babcock – background vocals
- Kenneth Buttrey – drums
- Jerry Carrigan – drums
- Dolores Edgin – background vocals
- Bob Ferguson – producer
- Lloyd Green – steel
- Junior Huskey – bass
- Mack Magaha – fiddle
- George McCormick – rhythm guitar
- Wayne Moss – guitar
- Al Pachucki – recording engineer
- June Page – background vocals
- Dolly Parton – lead vocals, liner notes
- Jerry Reed – guitar
- Hargus Robbins – piano
- Jerry Stembridge – guitar
- Buck Trent – electric banjo

== Charts ==
Chart performance for In the Good Old Days (When Times Were Bad)
Chart (1969)	Peak position
US Top Country Albums (Billboard)	15

== Release history ==
Release dates and formats for In the Good Old Days (When Times Were Bad)
Region	Date	Format	Label	Ref.
Various	February 3, 1969	LP; 8-track	RCA Victor	
Germany	1987	Cassette	RCA	
Portugal	1997	CD	Gold Collection	
Various	July 26, 2019	Digital download	Sony; Legacy	
