= Joshua (album) =

Studio album by Dolly Parton
- Released: April 12, 1971
- Recorded: October 31, 1969–February 11, 1971
- Studios: RCA Studio B, Nashville
- Genre: Country
- Length: 28:05
- Label: RCA Victor
- Producer: Bob Ferguson

Dolly Parton chronology
The Golden Streets of Glory (1971)	Joshua (1971)	The Best of Porter Wagoner & Dolly Parton (1971)

Singles from Joshua
- 1. "Joshua" Released: November 9, 1970

Joshua is the seventh solo studio album by American singer-songwriter Dolly Parton. It was released on April 12, 1971, by RCA Victor. The album was produced by Bob Ferguson. It peaked at number 16 on the Billboard Top Country Albums chart and number 198 on the Billboard 200 chart. The album's single, "Joshua", was nominated for a Grammy and was Parton's first song to reach number one on the Billboard Hot Country Songs chart. The two-month gap from The Golden Streets of Glory marks the shortest between two of Parton's albums.

== Release and promotion ==
The album was released April 12, 1971, on LP and 8-track.

=== Singles ===
The album's single, "Joshua", was released in November 1970 and peaked at number one on the Billboard Hot Country Songs chart and number 108 on the Billboard Bubbling Under Hot 100 chart. The single peaked at number two in Canada on the RPM Country Singles chart.

== Critical reception ==
Professional ratings
Review scores
Source	Rating
AllMusic	3.5/5 stars

The review published in the April 24, 1971 issue of Billboard said, "Dolly Parton took "Joshua" right to the top of the country singles chart, and she should now take him right to the top of the LP chart as well, with this exceptional album followup. Most of the tunes are originals, and there are many standouts, among them "You Can't Reach Me Anymore", "The Last One to Touch Me", and "Chicken Every Sunday"."

The April 10, 1971 issue of Cashbox featured a review that said, "Dolly Parton's 'Joshua' has to be one of the all-time best country records ever recorded. Now the title tune of her latest album, it enables those who missed it the first time around to hear it along with nine other fine selections. Always a best seller, this LP containing 'The Last One to Touch Me', 'Walls of My Mind', 'Chicken Every Sunday', 'Letter to Heaven', and 'J.J. Sneed', which are outstanding tracks, is sure to top the charts shortly."

AllMusic gave the album 3.5 out of 5 stars.

== Commercial performance ==
The album peaked at number 16 on the Billboard Top Country Albums chart and number 198 on the Billboard 200 chart. The album peaked at number 24 in Canada on the RPM Country Albums chart.

== Accolades ==
The album's single, "Joshua", was nominated for Best Country Vocal Performance, Female, at the 14th Annual Grammy Awards.

Awards and nominations received for Joshua
Award	Year	Category	Nominee/work	Result
Grammy Awards	1972	Best Country Vocal Performance, Female	"Joshua"	Nominated

== Recording ==
Recording sessions for the album began at RCA Studio B in Nashville, Tennessee, on April 20, 1970. Three additional sessions followed on October 21, 1970, January 26, and February 11, 1971. "Walls of My Mind", "You Can't Reach Me Anymore", and "The Fire's Still Burning" were recorded during the October 31, 1969 session for 1970's The Fairest of Them All.

== Reissues ==
The album was reissued on CD in 2001 with Parton's 1971 album Coat of Many Colors. It was released as a digital download on December 4, 2015.

== Track listing ==
All tracks written by Dolly Parton, except where noted.

Side one
No.	Title	Writer(s)	Recording date	Length
1.	"Joshua"		October 21, 1970	3:05
2.	"The Last One to Touch Me"		February 11, 1971	3:04
3.	"Walls of My Mind"		October 31, 1969	2:35
4.	"It Ain't Fair That It Ain't Right"	Bob Eggers; Janice Eggers	April 20, 1970	2:20
5.	"J.J. Sneed"	Parton; Dorothy Jo Hope	January 26, 1971	2:55

Side two
No.	Title	Writer(s)	Recording date	Length
1.	"You Can't Reach Me Anymore"	Parton; Hope	October 31, 1969	2:40
2.	"Daddy's Moonshine Still"		January 26, 1971	3:30
3.	"Chicken Every Sunday"	Charlie Craig; Betty Craig	October 21, 1970	2:38
4.	"The Fire's Still Burning"	Parton; Hope	October 31, 1969	2:51
5.	"Letter to Heaven"		January 26, 1971	2:27

== Personnel ==
Adapted from the album liner notes.

- Bobby Dyson – liner notes
- Bob Ferguson – producer
- Bill Meyers – cover art
- Al Pachucki – recording engineer
- Roy Shockley – recording technician

== Charts ==
Chart performance for Joshua
Chart (1971)	Peak position
Canada Country Albums (RPM)	24
US Billboard 200	198
US Top Country Albums (Billboard)	16

== Release history ==
Release dates and formats for Joshua
Region	Date	Format	Title	Label	Ref.
Various	April 12, 1971	LP; 8-track	Joshua	RCA Victor	
Europe	July 28, 2001	CD	Joshua & Coat of Many Colors	Camden Deluxe	
Various	December 4, 2015	Digital download	Joshua	Sony; Legacy	
