= The Golden Streets of Glory =

Studio album by Dolly Parton
- Released: February 15, 1971
- Recorded: May 11–13, 1970
- Studio: RCA Studio B (Nashville)
- Genre: Gospel; country
- Length: 24:49
- Label: RCA Victor
- Producer: Bob Ferguson

Dolly Parton chronology
Two of a Kind (1971)	The Golden Streets of Glory (1971)	Joshua (1971)

The Golden Streets of Glory is the sixth solo studio album by American singer-songwriter Dolly Parton. It was released on February 15, 1971, by RCA Victor. The album was produced by Bob Ferguson. It peaked at number 22 on the Billboard Top Country Albums chart. No singles were released from the album, but the title track was released as the B-side of the religious single "Comin' for to Carry Me Home" in May 1971. The album was nominated for Best Sacred Performance at the 14th Annual Grammy Awards. The album's liner notes were written by Parton's maternal grandfather, Rev. Jake Owens.

== Critical reception ==
Professional ratings
Review scores
Source	Rating
AllMusic	3/5 stars

The review published in the February 27, 1971 issue of Billboard said, "Sacred music is an essential part of the country field, and with this album Dolly Parton shows her knowledge of this material. Her vocals are full of sincerity and include such standards as "How Great Thou Art", "Wings of a Dove", and "I Believe"."

Cashbox published a review in the issue dated February 13, which said, "There has always been a tremendous similarity between country music and gospel music, and with this album, Dolly Parton closes the gap. Already one of the top female vocalists in her field, this new LP will practically immortalize her. It is honest, sincere, direct, and religious–all in one. "I Believe", "Yes, I See God", "Heaven's Just a Prayer Away", "Book of Life", "Lord, Hold My Hand", and "Wings of a Dove", are only a sampling of the selections that will make this new Dolly Parton album one of the all-time best sellers."

== Commercial performance ==
The album peaked at number 22 on the Billboard Top Country Albums chart.

== Accolades ==
The album was nominated for Best Sacred Performance at the 14th Annual Grammy Awards.

Awards and nominations received for The Golden Streets of Glory
Award	Year	Category	Nominee/work	Result
Grammy Awards	1972	Best Sacred Performance	The Golden Streets of Glory	Nominated

== Recording ==
Recording sessions for the album took place at RCA Studio B in Nashville, Tennessee, on May 11, 12 and 13, 1970.

== Reissues ==
The album was reissued on CD for the first time in 1993 as Golden Streets of Glory, with the track listing arranged in a different order, and again in 1997 under the title I Believe, using the 1993 track order. It was reissued again in 2010 as Letter to Heaven: Songs of Faith and Inspiration, with seven bonus tracks, including the 1971 single "Comin' for to Carry Me Home," which did not make the original album track listing, and an unreleased song from the original album sessions, "Would You Know Him (If You Saw Him)". The album was made available as a digital download on August 19, 2016.

== Track listing ==
Side one
No.	Title	Writer(s)	Recording date	Length
1.	"I Believe"	Ervin Drake; Jimmy Shirl; Irvin Graham; Al Stillman	May 13, 1970	2:17
2.	"Yes, I See God"	Dorothy Jo Hope	May 13, 1970	2:15
3.	"The Master's Hand"	Dolly Parton	May 12, 1970	2:41
4.	"Heaven's Just a Prayer Away"	Tommy Tomlinson	May 12, 1970	2:45
5.	"The Golden Streets of Glory"	Parton	May 11, 1970	2:54

Side two
No.	Title	Writer(s)	Recording date	Length
1.	"How Great Thou Art"	Stuart K. Hine	May 12, 1970	3:34
2.	"I'll Keep Climbing"	Dorothy Jo Hope	May 12, 1970	2:41
3.	"Book of Life"	Jake Robert Owens	May 13, 1970	1:44
4.	"Wings of a Dove"	Bob Ferguson	May 11, 1970	2:35
5.	"Lord, Hold My Hand"	Parton; Ginny Dean	May 13, 1970	2:03

Letter to Heaven: Songs of Faith & Inspiration bonus tracks (2010)
No.	Title	Writer(s)	Recording date	Length
11.	"Would You Know Him (If You Saw Him)"	Parton; Hope	May 11, 1970	2:53
12.	"Comin' for to Carry Me Home"	Traditional; Parton	January 25, 1971	3:02
13.	"Daddy Was an Old Time Preacher Man" (with Porter Wagoner)	Parton; Hope	April 21, 1970	3:03
14.	"God's Coloring Book"	Parton	April 16, 1971	2:17
15.	"Letter to Heaven"	Parton	January 26, 1971	2:26
16.	"Sacred Memories"	Parton	September 1, 1972	2:43
17.	"The Seeker"	Parton	December 9, 1974	3:14

1993 CD reissue, I Believe (1997)
No.	Title	Writer(s)	Recording date	Length
1.	"I Believe"	Ervin Drake; Jimmy Shirl; Irvin Graham; Al Stillman	May 13, 1970	2:17
2.	"Heaven's Just a Prayer Away"	Tommy Tomlinson	May 12, 1970	2:45
3.	"The Golden Streets of Glory"	Dolly Parton	May 11, 1970	2:54
4.	"Wings of a Dove"	Bob Ferguson	May 11, 1970	2:35
5.	"How Great Thou Art"	Stuart K. Hine	May 12, 1970	3:34
6.	"Yes, I See God"	Dorothy Jo Hope	May 13, 1970	2:15
7.	"The Master's Hand"	Parton	May 12, 1970	2:41
8.	"Lord, Hold My Hand"	Parton; Ginny Dean	May 13, 1970	2:03
9.	"I'll Keep Climbing"	Hope	May 12, 1970	2:41
10.	"Book of Life"	Jake Robert Owens	May 13, 1970	1:44

== Personnel ==
Adapted from the album liner notes.

- Bob Ferguson – producer
- Les Leverett – cover photo
- Rev. Jake Owens – liner notes
- Al Pachucki – recording engineer
- Dolly Parton – lead vocals
- Roy Shockley – recording technician

== Charts ==
Chart performance for The Golden Streets of Glory
Chart (1971)	Peak position
US Top Country Albums (Billboard)	22
US Cashbox Country Albums	8

== Release history ==
Release dates and formats for The Golden Streets of Glory
Region	Date	Format	Title	Label	Ref.
Various	February 15, 1971	LP; 8-track	The Golden Streets of Glory	RCA Victor	
United States	April 27, 1993	CD; cassette	Golden Streets of Glory	RCA; BMG Music	
United States	September 16, 1997	CD; cassette	I Believe	BMG Special Products	
United States	May 4, 2010	CD	Letter to Heaven: Songs of Faith and Inspiration	RCA Nashville; Legacy	
Various	August 19, 2016	Digital download	The Golden Streets of Glory	RCA Nashville	
