= Joshua (song) =

- Side A of the US single

Single by Dolly Parton

from the album Joshua
- B-side: "I'm Doing This for Your Sake"
- Released: November 9, 1970
- Recorded: October 1970
- Studio: RCA Studio B, Nashville
- Genre: Country
- Length: 3:05
- Label: RCA Victor
- Songwriter: Dolly Parton
- Producer: Bob Ferguson

Dolly Parton singles chronology
"Mule Skinner Blues" (1970)	"Joshua" (1970)	"Comin' for to Carry Me Home" (1971)

"Joshua" is a song written and recorded by American country music artist Dolly Parton. It was released on November 9, 1970, as the first single and title track from the album Joshua. The song was significant for being her first single to reach number 1 on the US country charts. The single reached number 1 on the Billboard country charts in February 1971. Parton received her first Grammy nomination in the Best Country Female Vocal category for the song, losing to Lynn Anderson.

== Background ==
The song drew on many Appalachian references from Parton's youth which she would revisit throughout her career.

== Content ==
The song is about an adventurous young girl who dares to visit the property of a rural recluse, who has a reputation for being mean and hostile. However, she finds that he is the opposite and ends up living in his shack with him.

== Chart performance ==
Weekly

Chart (1970–1971)	Peak position
US Hot Country Songs (Billboard)	1
US Bubbling Under Hot 100 (Billboard)	8
Canadian RPM Country Tracks	2

Year-End

Chart (1971)	Peak Position
US Hot Country Songs (Billboard)	25
