= Mule Skinner Blues =

1930 country song by Jimmie Rodgers

"Blue Yodel no. 8 Mule Skinner Blues"

Song by Jimmie Rodgers
- B-side: Jimmie’s Mean Mama Blues
- Published: February 13, 1931 by Southern Music Publishing Co., Inc., New York
- Released: February 6, 1931
- Recorded: July 11, 1930
- Studio: Hollywood Recording Studios, 7000 Santa Monica Blvd, Los Angeles, California
- Genre: Hillbilly (Country); Country blues
- Length: 2:50
- Label: RCA
- Songwriter: Jimmie Rodgers

Alternative cover
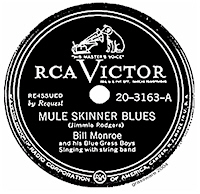
- Record label from Bill Monroe's version, 1946

Alternative cover
- Cover of the Fendermen's version, 1960

"Blue Yodel no. 8, Mule Skinner Blues" (a.k.a. "Muleskinner Blues" and "Muleskinner's Blues") is a classic country song written by Jimmie Rodgers. The song was first recorded by Rodgers in 1930 and has been recorded by many artists since then, acquiring the de facto title "Mule Skinner Blues" after Rodgers named it "Blue Yodel #8" (one of his Blue Yodels).

"George Vaughn", a pseudonym for songwriter George Vaughn Horton, is sometimes listed as co-author. Horton wrote the lyrics for "New Mule Skinner Blues", Bill Monroe's second recorded version of the song.

The song was discussed in the Ken Burns 2019 documentary miniseries Country Music and Jimmie Rodgers' rendition was on the soundtrack album for the series.

With no copyright renewal, the composition has been in the public domain since 1959.

== Structure ==
The song tells the tale of a down-on-his-luck mule skinner, approaching "the Captain", looking for work ("Good Morning, Captain." / "Good morning, Shine." / "Do you need another muleskinner on your new mud line?"). He boasts of his skills: "I can pop my 'nitials on a mule's behind" and hopes for "a dollar and a half a day". He directs the water boy to "bring some water round". The term "mule skinner", slang for muleteer, is a driver of mules, and has nothing to do with removing the animal's hide.

== Tom Dickson's "Labor Blues" ==
The first verse of the song is similar to Tom Dickson's 1928 recording "Labor Blues" in which the exchange is clearly between a white boss and an African-American worker who is quitting the job, not applying for it:

It’s "good mornin’ Captain", ‘e said "good mornin’ Shine",
Said "good mornin’ Captain", said "good mornin’ Shine".
"T’ain’t nuthin’ the matter, Captain, but I just ain’t gwine.

"I don’t mind workin’, Captain, from sun to sun,
I don’t mind workin’, Captain, from sun to sun.
But I want my money, Captain, when pay-day come."

"Captain" was a traditional term for the white boss; "Shine" is a derogatory expression for African American. After the narrator rebels and quits because he is not being paid, he turns his attention to his "Mississippi gal" and the remaining lyrics concern their romance. In this 12-bar blues recording, muleskinning is not mentioned, and the remaining Dickson lyrics differ from Rodgers', whose other Blue Yodels also used verses previously recorded by blues musicians, such as Blind Lemon Jefferson.

== Versions of "Muleskinner Blues" ==
1930s

- Rodgers' original version was a hit.
- Bill Monroe performed this song at his Grand Ole Opry debut on November 25, 1939. The performance can be found on the MCA compilation Music of Bill Monroe From 1936-1994 (1994).

1940s

- Monroe recorded this song as his first solo studio recording on October 7, 1940 for the RCA Victor, the song became a hit and one of Monroe's signature songs.
- Woody Guthrie recorded the song in 1944 for Asch Recordings, which can be found on Muleskinner Blues: The Asch Recordings, Vol. 2, and on Original Folk: Best of Woody Guthrie (Music Club Deluxe, 2008).

1950s

- Monroe re-recorded the song in 1950 as "New Mule Skinner Blues" in his first session for Decca, with new lyrics written by George Vaughn Horton (credited as "George Vaughn"). Monroe apparently never sang the song with Horton's lyrics in concert.
- Joe D. Gibson (Jody Gibson) recorded a souped-up version titled "Good Morning Captain" on tetra Records, which served as a model for the Fendermen.

1960s

- The Fendermen - "'Mule Skinner Blues" (Soma Records, 1960)
  This Madison, Wisconsin-based duo reached number five on the Billboard charts with their version, featuring abbreviated lyrics and strong Fender electric guitar instrumentation. This version is arguably the most widely circulated of recent versions of the song, due to its Billboard chart performance and its subsequent prolific appearances on novelty song collections. The song reached number two in Canada.
- Bob Dylan made this song part of his live performance at the Finjan Club, Montreal, Canada, in July 1962.
- Grandpa Jones - "Muleskinner Blues" was recorded at some point in the '60s.
- David Wiffen - David Wiffen at The Bunkhouse Coffeehouse, Vancouver BC (1965)
- The Wildwood Boys, a bluegrass band featuring Jerry Garcia, Robert Hunter, and David Nelson, played the song as part of their live repertoire in 1963.
- Jose Feliciano - "Mule Skinner Blues" (RCA Victor Records, 1964)
- A novelty version of the song, "Batskinner" by Robin and the Batmen (Sara 6612, 1966), was inspired by both the Fendermen version of "Mule Skinner Blues" and the popular Batman television series. ("Good morning, Commissioner!")
- The Country Gentlemen - Live from the Stage of the Roanoake Bluegrass Festival (1967)

1970s

"Mule Skinner Blues (Blue Yodel No. 8)"

Single by Dolly Parton

from the album The Best of Dolly Parton
- B-side: "More Than Their Share"
- Released: June 1970
- Recorded: May 4, 1970
- Studio: RCA Studio B, Nashville
- Genre: Country
- Length: 3:10
- Label: RCA Victor 47-9863
- Songwriters: Jimmie Rodgers; George Vaughan
- Producer: Bob Ferguson

Dolly Parton singles chronology
"Daddy Come and Get Me" (1969)	"Mule Skinner Blues (Blue Yodel No. 8)" (1970)	"Joshua" (1970)

- Ramblin' Jack Elliott - Johnny Cash Show (1971) Ramblin' Jack Elliott, Norman Blake, and Randy Scruggs on the Johnny Cash Show, January 6, 1971.
- Dolly Parton - The Best Of Dolly Parton (1970): This 1970 recording of the song reached number three on the U.S. country charts, and earned Parton a Grammy nomination. (Parton and Bill Monroe later performed the song together on the 1978 CBS television special Fifty Years of Country Music.)
- Jerry Reed - Georgia Sunshine (1971) Chet Atkins plays on the right channel and takes one guitar solo.
- Stompin' Tom Connors - Live at the Horseshoe (1971)
- Levi's used a variation of this song for its blue jeans commercial using stop-motion animation, around 1972. Lyrics included:
  "Good Morning, World! Good Morning to you! I'm Wearing my Levi's, Le-hee-hee-hee-vis!"

1980s

- Tony Rice - Cold On The Shoulder (1984)

1990s

- The Cramps - Stay Sick! (1990)
- Sweethearts of the Rodeo - Beautiful Lies (1996)

2000s

- Mutilators - Hot Rod Whore (2003)
- Scott H. Biram - The Dirty Old One Man Band (2005)
- Rhonda Vincent - Ragin' Live (Rounder, 2005)

2010s

- Marcus Singletary - Sings Country Music Standards (2013)
- Melinda Schneider and Beccy Cole covered the song on their album Great Women of Country (2014).
- Rhonda Vincent and the Rage - All the Rage (2016)
- Sore Points recorded and performed the song on The X-Files season 11, episode three (2018)

== Charting versions ==
Release date	Artist	Chart Positions			
Release date	Artist	U.S. C&W	U.S.	CAN C&W	U.K.
1960	The Fendermen	16	5	—	32
1970	Dolly Parton	3	—	4	—
1976	Jerry Palmer	—	—	3	—
