= Live and Well =

Live album by Dolly Parton
- Released: September 14, 2004
- Recorded: December 12–13, 2002
- Genre: Country
- Length: 102:38
- Label: Sugar Hill
- Producers: Dolly Parton, Gary Davis, The Blueniques

Dolly Parton chronology
| For God and Country (2003) | Live and Well (2004) | Those Were the Days (2005) |

Professional ratings
Review scores
| Source | Rating |
|---|---|
| AllMusic | 3.5/5 stars |
| Austin Chronicle | 3/5 stars |
| The Encyclopedia of Popular Music | 3/5 stars |
| PopMatters | 6/10 stars |
| Uncut | 2/5 stars |

Live and Well is a live album by Dolly Parton, released on September 14, 2004. It was recorded during her 2002 Halos & Horns Tour, her first in years; the performances on December 12 and 13, 2002 were used. A DVD of the concert was released simultaneously with the album.

== Critical reception ==
Will Harris of PopMatters writes, "Live and Well is a document of Parton's 2002 tour, released simultaneously on CD and DVD, and, unlike a lot of live albums, this is a proper souvenir of one of her concerts, complete with the chatter between numbers that's so often cut from live records. Obviously, this is good news for her fans, many of who probably weren't able to catch one of those performances (she did only 14 shows); for others, however, it has its ups and downs."

Uncut says, "the return-to-the-mountain bluegrass of recent years ("The Grass Is Blue", "Shine", "Little Sparrow", "I'm Gone") is brilliantly served by one of the most irresistible forces in the history of country."

David McPherson of Exclaim! writes in his review that, "Live and Well confirms that musically and physically Parton is just that; as this country crooner approaches 60, she is still as energetic and youthful as ever."

The Austin Chronicle's Christopher Gray writes, "Ebullient as ever, Parton's banter is as much fun as the music; cornier than an Iowa silo, she's full of zingers."

== Track listing ==
All tracks are written by Dolly Parton, unless otherwise noted.

Disc 1
| No. | Title | Writer(s) | Length |
|---|---|---|---|
| 1. | "Orange Blossom Special" | Ervin T. Rouse | 1:42 |
| 2. | "Train, Train" | Shorty Medlocke | 2:34 |
| 3. | "The Grass is Blue" | | 2:32 |
| 4. | "Mountain Angel" | | 8:23 |
| 5. | "Shine" | Ed Roland | 5:18 |
| 6. | "Little Sparrow" | | 4:43 |
| 7. | "Rocky Top" | Felice Bryant; Boudleaux Bryant | 2:55 |
| 8. | "My Tennessee Mountain Home" | | 3:26 |
| 9. | "Coat of Many Colors" | | 5:18 |
| 10. | "Smoky Mountain Memories" | | 5:36 |
| 11. | "Applejack" | | 4:33 |
| 12. | "Marry Me" | | 3:22 |
| Total length: | | | 50:22 |

Disc 2
| No. | Title | Writer(s) | Length |
|---|---|---|---|
| 1. | "Halos and Horns" | | 5:06 |
| 2. | "I'm Gone" | | 4:17 |
| 3. | "Dagger Through the Heart" | | 3:57 |
| 4. | "If" | David Gates | 4:08 |
| 5. | "After the Gold Rush" | Neil Young | 3:38 |
| 6. | "9 to 5" | | 3:22 |
| 7. | "Jolene" | | 3:50 |
| 8. | "A Cappella Medley: Islands in the Stream; Here You Come Again; Why'd You Come in Here Lookin' Like That; Two Doors Down" | Barry Gibb; Robin Gibb; Maurice Gibb; Barry Mann; Cynthia Weil; Bob Carlisle; Randy Thomas; Dolly Parton | 6:08 |
| 9. | "We Irish" | | 4:45 |
| 10. | "Stairway to Heaven" | Robert Plant and Jimmy Page | 7:38 |
| 11. | "I Will Always Love You" | | 5:18 |
| Total length: | | | 52:07 |

- The DVD track list is the same as the one for the CD with the exception that the first two songs on the DVD ("Orange Blossom Special" and "Train, Train") are listed as a single track.
- Track information verified from the album's liner notes.

== Charts ==
| Chart (2004) | Peak position |
|---|---|
| Australian Country Albums (ARIA) | 16 |
| US Billboard 200 | 161 |
| US Top Country Albums | 22 |
| US Independent Albums | 12 |
| UK Country Compilations (OCC) | 2 |
| UK Independent Albums (Official Charts) | 34 |

== Personnel ==
- Dolly Parton - vocals

The Blueniques

- Gary Davis - banjo, acoustic guitar
- Richard Dennison - acoustic guitar, keyboards, vocals
- Randy Kohrs - resonator guitar, vocals
- Jimmy Mattingly - fiddle
- Brent Truitt - mandolin
- Steve Turner - drums
- Jay Weaver - acoustic bass guitar
- Kent Wells - acoustic guitar, vocals
