= Buck Trent =

American country music instrumentalist (1938–2023)

- Born: Charles Wilburn Trent; February 17, 1938
- Origin: Spartanburg, South Carolina, U.S.
- Died: October 9, 2023 (aged 85)
- Genres: Bluegrass; country; country rock
- Occupation: Instrumentalist
- Instruments: Banjo; dobro; steel guitar; mandolin; electric bass; guitar
- Years active: 1948–2023
- Website: www.bucktrent.com

Charles Wilburn "Buck" Trent (February 17, 1938 – October 9, 2023) was an American country music instrumentalist. He played the five-string banjo, dobro, steel guitar, mandolin, electric bass, and guitar.

== Biography ==
Charles Wilburn Trent was born on February 17, 1938. Trent was performing on radio stations WORD and WSPA in Spartanburg by age 11. He traveled to California and Texas, finally arriving in Nashville in 1959, where he joined the Bill Carlisle Show and first appeared on the Grand Ole Opry. He was a member of Bill Monroe's Bluegrass Boys from 1960 to 1961 and Porter Wagoner's Wagon Masters from 1962 to 1973, and also appeared on the Roy Clark Show and Hee Haw from 1974 to 1982. He played on Dolly Parton's "I Will Always Love You" and "Jolene". In 2012, Buck was featured on two songs on Marty Stuart's album Nashville, Vol. 1: Tear the Woodpile Down.

Over his long history, Trent received many awards and nominations. Roy Clark and he were twice named the Country Music Association Instrumental Group of the Year (1975, 1976) and he was twice the number-one Instrumentalist of the Year for the Music City Awards. Included in his nominations are the 1976 number-one Instrumentalist of the Year for Record World, 1972 through 1981 number-one Instrumentalist for the Music City News Awards, and in 1979–1981 was Instrumental Group of the Year (with Wendy Holcomb in the bluegrass category) for the Music City News Awards.

In addition to The Porter Wagoner Show and Hee Haw, other television credits for Trent include The Marty Stuart Show, Country's Family Reunion on RFD-TV, Mike Douglas Show, The Tonight Show, Nashville on the Road, Tommy Hunter Show, Command Performance, Music City Tonight, Nashville Now, and Dinah!

Trent's performing career also included many touring shows, in particular he toured the Soviet Union with Roy Clark in 1976. This was the first country music act to do so. In the early 1980s while on tour with the Porter Wagoner Show, Trent came to Branson, Missouri, and performed at the Baldknobber's Jamboree Theatre. Several years later, he opened for Mickey Gilley at the Mickey Gilley Theatre in Branson, and then in 1990, he became the first national act to open a live music show in Branson, performed in the morning. Trent's morning show there was called Buck Trent Country Music Show and (as of November 2015) was performed at Baldknobbers Jamboree Theatre. In 2016, his show moved to the Jim Stafford Theater. In 2017, he moved to the Branson Famous Theatre with the Baldknobbers. Trent’s final album, Spartanburg Blues, was released in 2018. In 2023, Trent was inducted into the American Banjo Museum Hall of Fame under the Five-String Performance category.

Trent was also known for his signature phrase, "Uh-huh, oh yeah," a phrase that originated in a sketch he performed on Hee Haw. He uttered the phrase as part of his shows, accompanied by a thumbs-up gesture.

== Death ==
Trent died on October 9, 2023, at the age of 85.

== Discography ==
- The Sound of Bluegrass Banjo, 1962
- The Sound of Five String Banjo, 1962
- Gime Five, 1966
- 5-string General, 1967
- Sounds of Now and Beyond, 1972
- A Pair of Fives (Banjos That Is), 1974 (with Roy Clark)
- Bionic Banjo, 1976
- Oh Yeah! Banjos, Boisterous Ballads, And Buck, 1977
- Banjo Bandits, 1978 (with Roy Clark)
- Spartanburg Blues, 2018
- Christmas: Buck Trent Style, 2023
