= Mack Magaha =

Fiddler

Mack Magaha (August 1, 1929 – August 15, 2003) was an American bluegrass fiddler best known as a member of Porter Wagoner's band and a long-time backup player in the pioneering bluegrass band Reno and Smiley.

== Music career ==
In 1955, Magaha joined Reno and Smiley as a member of the Tennessee Cutups. Together with Don Reno, he wrote the popular song "I know You're Married But I Love You Still", which was recorded by Reno & Smiley. It was later covered by artists such as Bill Anderson, Rodney Crowell, Jan Howard, Patty Loveless, Jimmy Martin, Red Sovine, and Travis Tritt. In 1964, he joined Porter Wagoner's Wagonmasters. During the 1960s, he worked as an old-time fiddler on The Porter Wagoner Show and later worked with the aspiring female star on the show, Dolly Parton. Among the later songs Magaha wrote, "We'll Get Ahead Someday" provided a top-ten country single for Wagoner and Parton in 1968, one of their first duet hits.

He became a regular performer at the theme park Opryland USA in the 1970s. He died at age 74 at Nashville's Veterans Hospital.

Magaha was known as Nashville's Dancing Fiddle Man. Like Curly Ray Cline, Magaha had a fiery stage presence, doing his dancelike movements while he was fiddling.
