= RCA Studio B =

Music recording studio in Nashville, Tennessee

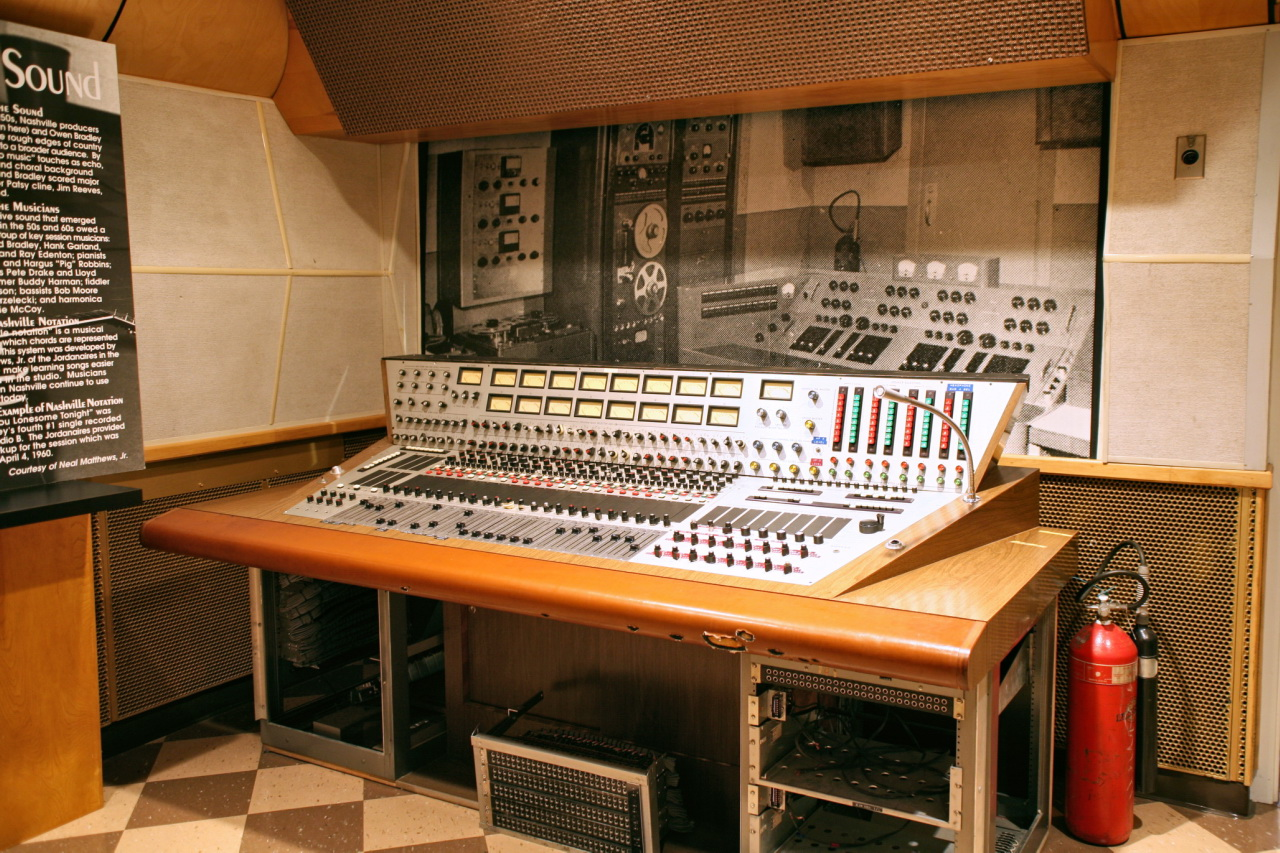
- Interactive map of the RCA Studio B area
- Alternative names: RCA Victor Studios; Little Victor; Home of a Thousand Hits

General information
- Location: 1611 Roy Acuff Place, Nashville, Tennessee
- Coordinates: 36.1500°N 86.7928°W

Website
- https://studiob.org

RCA Studio B is a music recording studio in Nashville, Tennessee, established in 1957 by Steve Sholes and Chet Atkins for RCA Victor. Originally known simply as the RCA Victor Studio, in 1965 the studio was designated as Studio B after RCA Victor built the newer, larger Studio A in an adjacent building.

Located centrally in what would become Nashville's Music Row, the RCA Victor Studios were an essential factor to the development of the musical production style and sound engineering technique known as the Nashville Sound. In the two decades the studio was in operation, RCA Studio B produced 60 percent of the Billboard magazine's Country chart hits.

The studio closed in 1977. Since 1992 the studio has been under the ownership of the Country Music Hall of Fame, which offers scheduled tours of the facilities.

== History ==
=== Early history ===
After years of using portable equipment to record projects in various recording facilities around Nashville, Steve Sholes and Chet Atkins established RCA Victor's first Nashville recording facility within the Methodist Television Radio & Film Commission building at 1525 McGavock Street in 1954. It was at this studio in January, 1956, that Sholes and Atkins produced the first RCA Victor recording session with Elvis Presley during which he recorded Heartbreak Hotel, the song that would become Presley's first gold record and the biggest-selling single of 1956. The building on McGavock Street that housed this recording studio was demolished in 2006 for a parking lot.

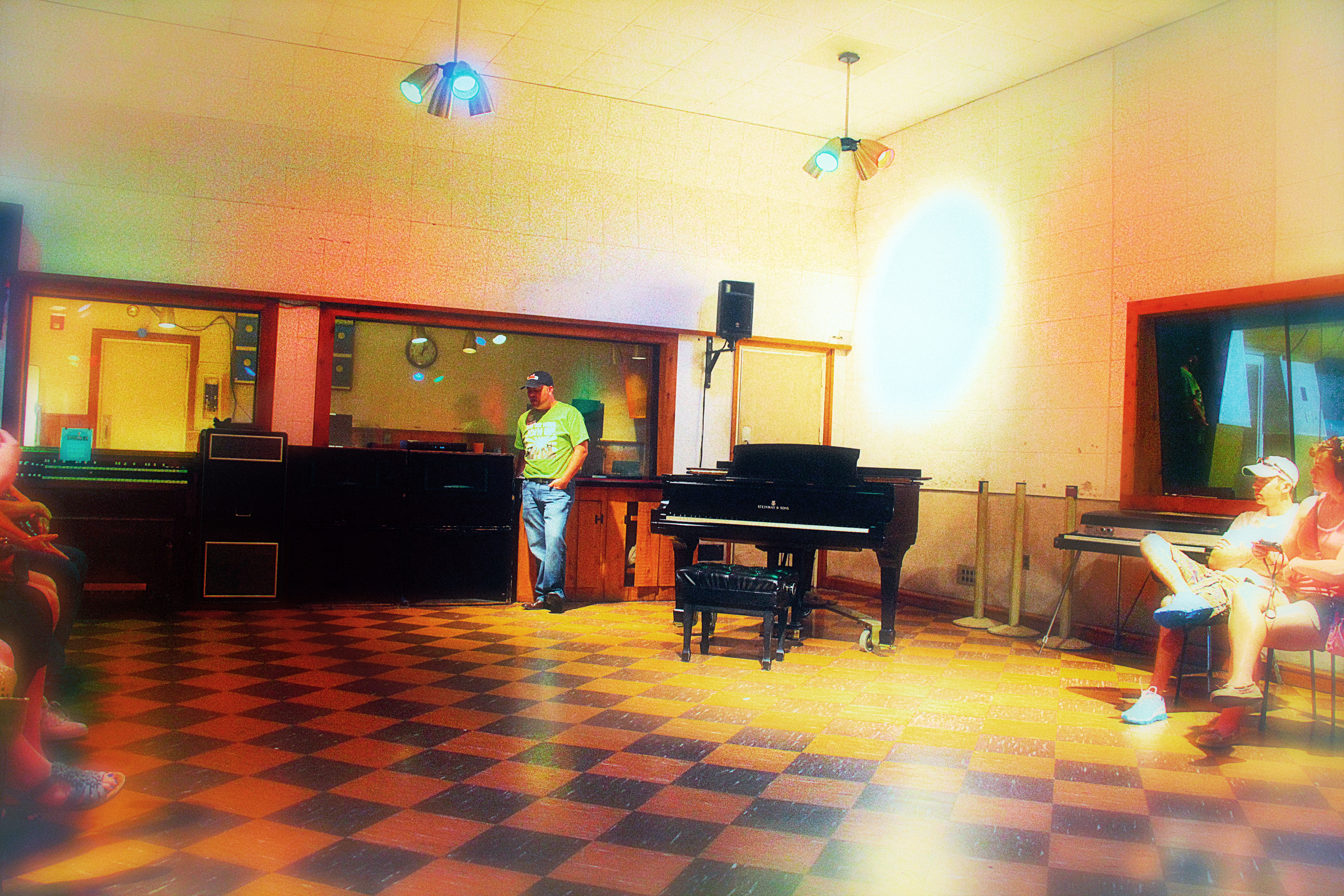
Main live recording room in RCA Studio B

=== Studio ===
With Atkins and Sholes establishing RCA Victor's Nashville operations, the company sought to build a recording studio. The company's chief engineer and recording manager Bill Milttenburg drew building plans on a dinner napkin and Dan Maddox, a local businessman, offered to construct the building as an investment. Four months later, in November 1957, the pastel cinderblock building located at 1611 Hawkins Street (later re-named Roy Acuff Place) was completed at a cost of $37,515, and Maddox leased it to RCA for the next twenty years.

Business offices resided in the single-story front of the building, with studio facilities in the rear. The studio measured 40.5 by 26.25 feet (12.34 by 8.00 m), with a 13 feet (4.0 m) high ceiling. A grand piano, acquired from NBC's Tonight Starring Steve Allen, sat in the corner. The small control room was only 12 feet (3.7 m) deep, and housed an RCA radio station tube console with 12 microphone inputs and four outputs, which fed an Ampex 2-track deck. An echo chamber occupied the second story.

In March, 1959, Bill Porter replaced Bob Ferris, RCA Studio B's first chief engineer, and by June had mixed a number one hit: "The Three Bells" by the Browns. Porter considered the studio's acoustics problematic, with resonant room modes creating an uneven frequency response. To lessen the problem, he took some $60 from the studio's petty cash and bought fiberglass acoustic ceiling panels which he cut into triangles and hung from the ceiling at varying heights; these were dubbed "Porter Pyramids". Porter also marked "X"es on the floor where he discovered, by careful experimentation, the resonant modes to be minimal. Porter positioned lead vocalists, background vocalists, and acoustic guitarists at microphones placed directly over his marks. After these improvements, Don Gibson recorded his album Girls, Guitars and Gibson in the studio. Porter later told an interviewer: "Everybody said, 'God, what a different sound!'"

Porter also preferred the luminous echo of the studio's EMT 140 plate reverb rather than its echo chamber, keeping the plates chilled in the air conditioned room to brighten their sound.

In 1960 and 1961, an addition was built to provide office space and rooms for tape mastering and a lacquer mastering lab.

Nashville painter and singer/songwriter Gil Veda—introduced to the Grand Ole Opry crowd as "The Spanish Hank Williams" in 1962—was the first Hispanic singer to record at RCA's Studio B.

In her 1994 memoir, My Life And Other Unfinished Business, Dolly Parton recounted how she was rushing to her first recording session at Studio B in October 1967 (shortly after having signed with RCA Victor) and, in her haste to make the session on time, drove her new Chevrolet through the side wall of the building. She noted that the spot where her car impacted the building and was repaired is still visible.

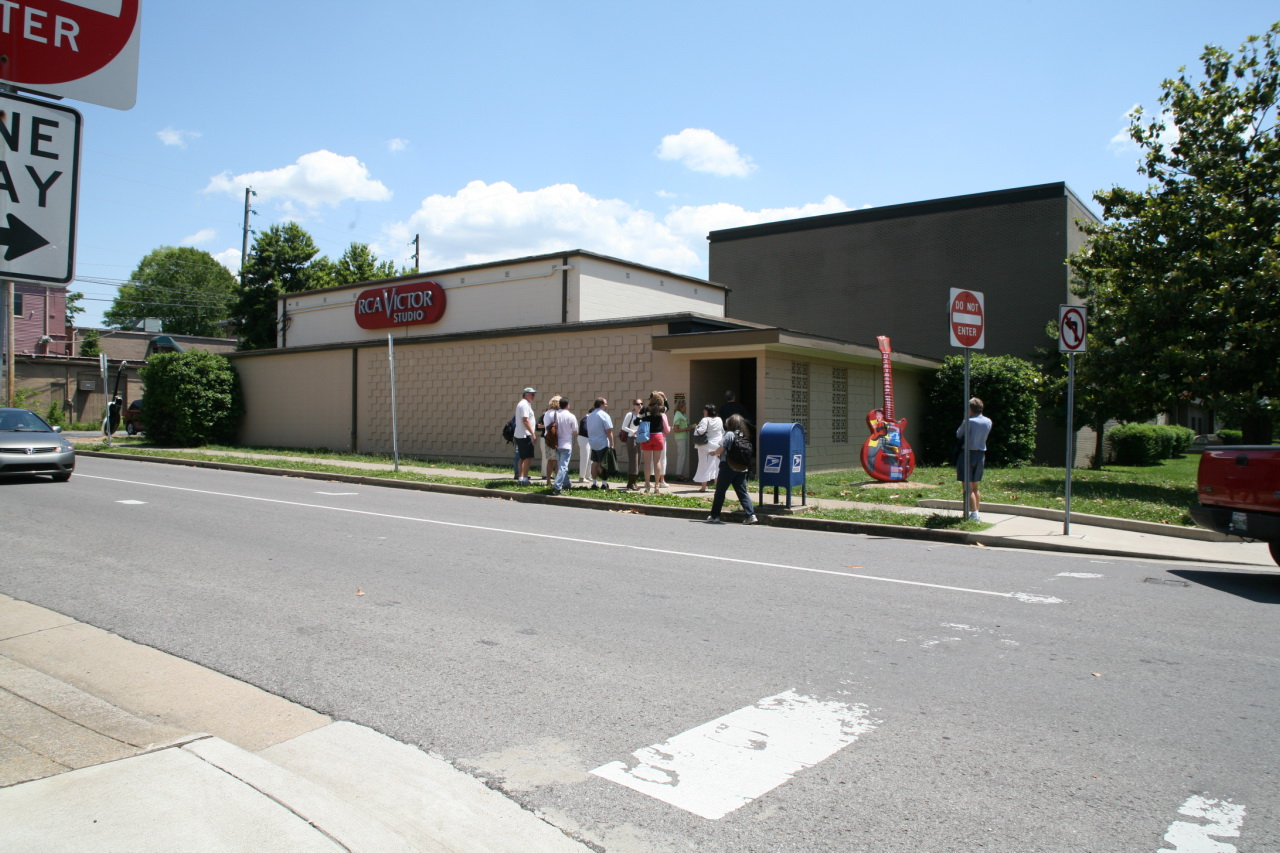
RCA Studio B exterior view

=== Historic landmark ===
In 1977, the studio was made available to the Country Music Hall of Fame for tours, and in 1992 it was donated to the Country Music Hall of Fame by the late Dan Maddox. Until 2001, it was operated as an attraction when the new home for the Hall of Fame was built in downtown Nashville. From 2001 to 2011 the studio was co-operated by the Country Music Hall of Fame and Belmont University's Mike Curb College of Entertainment and Music Business program, which utilized the studio to teach students basic techniques of analog recording.

In 2012, the National Park Service listed RCA Studio B on the National Register of Historic Places. The same year, operation shifted solely to the Country Music Hall of Fame and Museum, which offers daily scheduled tours of the studio. In 2002, the Mike Curb Family Foundation purchased the studio and leased it in perpetuity to the Country Music Hall of Fame and Museum for $1 per year, funding an exterior renovation and an interior restoration to its historic appearance as a working analog recording studio.

== Production style ==
Bradley Studios, RCA Studio B, and later RCA Studio A, were essential locations to the development of the "Nashville Sound." Chet Atkins and the production team at RCA Studio B, notably Steve Sholes, Owen Bradley, Bob Ferguson, and Bill Porter produced studio recordings in the Nashville Sound style, a sophisticated style characterized by background vocals and strings. The Nashville Sound both revived the popularity of country music and helped establish Nashville's reputation as an international recording center, with these three studios at the center of what would become known as Music Row. Studio B was also where the Nashville number system, a chord-chart shorthand notation using numbers rather than notes to speed transposition and session work, was refined by Neil Matthews of the Jordanaires and Charlie McCoy.

== List of notable artists recorded ==
More than 47,000 songs were recorded at RCA Studio B, many by legendary music artists. Elvis Presley is known to have recorded more than two hundred songs at this location.

Following is a list of some notable artists who recorded songs at Studio B.

- Duane Allman
- Eddy Arnold
- Chet Atkins
- Bobby Bare
- David Bowie
- Harold Bradley
- The Browns
- Jerry Byrd
- Floyd Cramer
- Dottsy
- The Everly Brothers
- Donna Fargo
- Connie Francis
- Hank Garland
- Don Gibson
- Mickey Gilley
- Bobby Goldsboro
- Billy Grammer
- Buddy Harman
- John Hartford
- Al Hirt
- Homer and Jethro
- Norma Jean
- Waylon Jennings
- Grandpa Jones
- The Jordanaires
- Anita Kerr Singers
- Hank Locklin
- John D. Loudermilk
- Bob Luman
- Charlie McCoy
- Roger Miller
- The Monkees
- Bob Moore
- Willie Nelson
- Notre Dame High School (Elmira, New York)
- Roy Orbison
- Dolly Parton
- Elvis Presley
- Charley Pride
- Boots Randolph
- Jim Reeves
- Tommy Roe
- Ronny & the Daytonas
- Barry Sadler
- Connie Smith
- Hank Snow
- Gary Stewart
- The Strokes
- Nat Stuckey
- Sue Thompson
- Johnny Tillotson
- Ernest Tubb
- The Velvets
- Porter Wagoner
- Gillian Welch
- Dottie West
