= Dolly Parton singles discography =

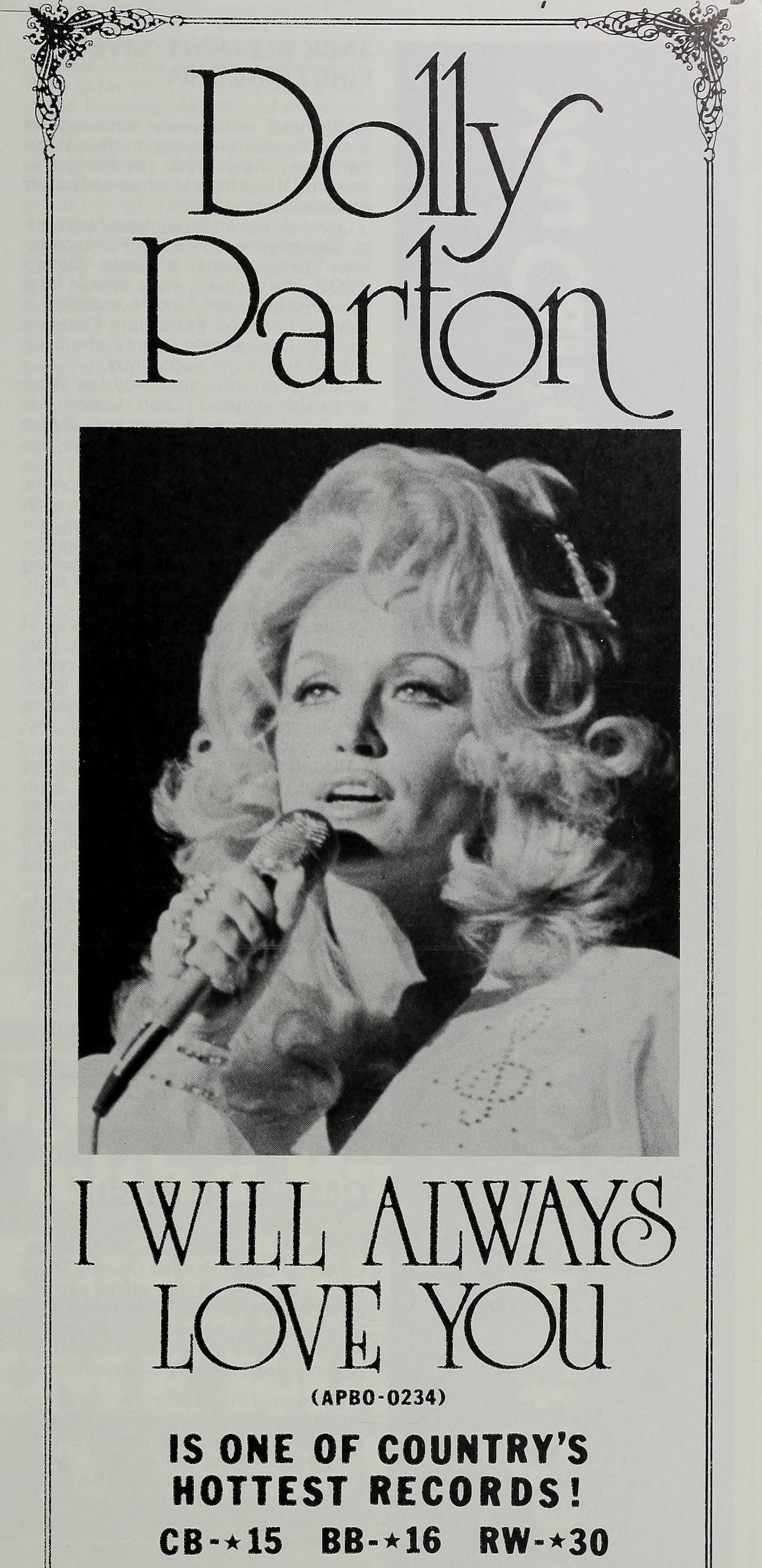
- Advertisement for "I Will Always Love You", 1974
- As lead artist: 199
- As featured artist: 49
- Promotional singles: 6
- Music videos: 68

The singles discography of American country singer-songwriter Dolly Parton (1946–2026) includes over 200 singles and touches on eight decades. Parton released 198 singles as a lead artist, 49 as a featured artist, six promotional singles and 68 music videos. Parton also released 21 singles with Porter Wagoner from 1968 to 1980, bringing her total number of singles to 243.

After releasing two unsuccessful singles as a teenager, Parton signed a recording contract with Monument Records in 1964, and moved to Nashville, Tennessee shortly afterward, releasing a series of singles on the label, the highest charting being her 1965 single "Happy Happy Birthday Baby". In 1967, Monument released Parton's debut solo album, Hello, I'm Dolly. It spawned the hits "Dumb Blonde" and "Something Fishy", reaching number 24 and number 17 respectively. In September 1967, Parton was asked to replace country vocalist Norma Jean as the co-host of the syndicated country music television show The Porter Wagoner Show, alongside country star Porter Wagoner. The pair recorded 12 albums together for RCA Victor, and in the late 1960s and early 1970s had a series of top 10 hits on the country charts, including "The Last Thing on My Mind", "Tomorrow Is Forever", and "Daddy Was an Old Time Preacher Man". On Wagoner's television series, Parton gained a national audience of millions of viewers, and her own singles began to move up the country charts. By the early 1970s, her solo hits regularly appeared in the top 10, as did her duets with Wagoner. Her first chart-topper, 1970's "Joshua", followed by 1971's "Coat of Many Colors", 1972's "Touch Your Woman", and "Traveling Man" and "Jolene", both from 1973, all reached the top 10 on the US country singles charts, with "Jolene" becoming her second number one single in February 1974. In mid-1974, Parton split with Wagoner and his show in order to expand her career as a solo artist, writing and recording the number one hit, "I Will Always Love You" as a goodbye to Wagoner.

Following her departure from Wagoner's show, Parton branched out into pop music with her 1977 single "Here You Come Again", which hit number one on the country chart and number 3 on the Billboard Hot 100, helping to produce a string of crossover hits in the late 1970s and early 1980s, including "Two Doors Down", "Heartbreaker", "You're the Only One", "9 to 5" and "But You Know I Love You". In addition, album sales also increased, with many being certified Gold or Platinum by the RIAA.

After a slight commercial decline in the late 1980s, Parton signed with Columbia Records and returned to traditional country music with the album White Limozeen, which spawned the number one country singles, "Why'd You Come in Here Lookin' Like That" and "Yellow Roses". Two more traditional-themed albums were released in the early 1990s that were also successful, Eagle When She Flies (1991) and Slow Dancing with the Moon (1993).

In 1999 she signed a contract with Sugar Hill Records and recorded a series of Bluegrass albums, beginning with The Grass Is Blue in 1999, followed by Little Sparrow (2001) and Halos & Horns (2002). In 2007 she formed her own record label, Dolly Records and the following year issued her first mainstream country album in over 10 years entitled Backwoods Barbie, which produced five singles, including the minor country hit, "Better Get to Livin'", which peaked at number 48 on the Billboard country chart.

Parton holds the distinction of having the most number one hits by a female artist on the Billboard Hot Country Songs chart (25). Parton also holds the record for most top 10 albums on the Billboard Top Country Albums chart (43). She previously held the record for the most top 10 hits by a female country artist until Reba McEntire surpassed her in 2009 with her 56th top 10 hit, "Cowgirls Don't Cry". Parton was the only artist to have top 20 hits on the Billboard Hot Country Songs chart in every decade from the 1960s to the 2010s.

== As lead artist ==
=== 1950s and 1960s ===
List of singles, with selected chart positions, showing other relevant details
Title	Year	Peak chart positions			Album
Title	Year	US	US Cou.	CAN Cou.	Album
"Puppy Love"	1959	—	—	—	Non-album singles
"So Little I Wanted, So Little I Got" (with Bill Owens)	1962	—	—	—	Non-album singles
"It's Sure Gonna Hurt" (with the Merry Melody Singers)	1962	—	—	—	Non-album singles
"What Do You Think About Lovin'"	1964	—	—	—	Non-album singles
"Happy, Happy Birthday Baby"	1965	— (Note: "Happy, Happy Birthday Baby" did not enter the Billboard Hot 100, but peaked at number 108 on the Bubbling Under the Hot 100 chart in the issue dated October 16, 1965.)	—	—	Non-album singles
"Busy Signal"	1966	—	—	—	Non-album singles
"Don't Drop Out"	1966	—	—	—	Non-album singles
"The Little Things"	1966	—	—	—	Hello, I'm Dolly
"Dumb Blonde"	1966	—	24	—	Hello, I'm Dolly
"Something Fishy"	1967	—	17	—	Hello, I'm Dolly
"Why, Why, Why"	1967	—	—	—	Non-album single
"I'm Not Worth the Tears"	1968	—	—	—	Non-album single
"Just Because I'm a Woman"	1968	—	17	8	Just Because I'm a Woman
"In the Good Old Days (When Times Were Bad)"	1968	—	25	—	In the Good Old Days (When Times Were Bad)
"Daddy"	1969	—	40	—	My Blue Ridge Mountain Boy
"In the Ghetto"	1969	—	50	12	My Blue Ridge Mountain Boy
"My Blue Ridge Mountain Boy"	1969	—	45	22	My Blue Ridge Mountain Boy
"Daddy Come and Get Me"	1969	—	40	31	The Fairest of Them All
"—" denotes a recording that did not chart or was not released in that territory.

=== 1970s ===
List of singles, with selected chart positions, showing other relevant details
Title	Year	Peak chart positions									Certifications (sales thresholds)	Album
Title	Year	US	US AC	US Cou.	US Dan.	AUS	CAN	CAN AC	CAN Cou.	UK	Certifications (sales thresholds)	Album
"Mule Skinner Blues (Blue Yodel No. 8)"	1970	—	—	3	—	—	—	—	4	—		The Best of Dolly Parton
"Joshua"	1970	— (Note: "Joshua" did not enter the Billboard Hot 100, but peaked at number 108 on the Bubbling Under the Hot 100 chart in the issue dated February 20, 1971.)	—	1	—	—	—	—	2	—		Joshua
"Comin' for to Carry Me Home"	1971	—	—	23	—	—	—	—	—	—		Non-album single
"My Blue Tears"	1971	—	—	17	—	—	—	—	4	—		Coat of Many Colors
"Coat of Many Colors"	1971	—	—	4	—	60	—	—	15	—	RIAA: Gold; ARIA: Gold; BPI: Silver	Coat of Many Colors
"Touch Your Woman"	1972	—	—	6	—	—	—	—	28	—		Touch Your Woman
"Washday Blues"	1972	—	—	20	—	—	—	—	7	—		My Favorite Songwriter, Porter Wagoner
"When I Sing for Him"	1972	—	—	—	—	—	—	—	—	—		My Favorite Songwriter, Porter Wagoner
"My Tennessee Mountain Home"	1972	—	—	15	—	—	—	—	10	—		My Tennessee Mountain Home
"Traveling Man"	1973	—	—	20	—	—	—	—	12	—		Bubbling Over
"Jolene"	1973	16 (Note: "Jolene" originally peaked at number 60 on the Billboard Hot 100 in 1973. After Parton's death in August 2026, "Jolene" re-entered the Hot 100 for a new peak of number 16 on the chart dated September 5, 2026.)	44	1	—	99	20 (Note: "Jolene" originally peaked at number 84 on the RPM Top Singles chart in 1974. After Parton's death in August 2026, "Jolene" entered the Canadian Hot 100 at number 20 on the chart dated September 5, 2026.)	40	1	6 (Note: "Jolene" originally peaked at number 7 on the UK Singles Chart in 1976. After Parton's death in August 2026, "Jolene" reached a new peak of number 6.)	RIAA: 3× Platinum; ARIA: 7× Platinum; BPI: 3× Platinum; RMNZ: 5× Platinum	Jolene
"I Will Always Love You"	1974	27 (Note: "I Will Always Love You" did not enter the Hot 100 in 1974. A re-recording peaked at number 53 in 1982, and is listed separately below. After Parton's death in August 2026, the original 1973 recording of "I Will Always Love You" entered the Hot 100 for the first time at number 27, on the chart dated September 5, 2026.)	—	1	—	—	—	30	4	—	RIAA: Platinum; ARIA: Platinum; BPI: Gold; RMNZ: Gold	Jolene
"Love Is Like a Butterfly"	1974	— (Note: "Love Is Like a Butterfly" did not enter the Billboard Hot 100, but peaked at number 105 on the Bubbling Under the Hot 100 chart in the issue dated September 28, 1974.)	38	1	—	55	—	—	2	—		Love Is Like a Butterfly
"The Bargain Store"	1975	—	35	1	—	—	—	—	3	—		The Bargain Store
"The Seeker"	1975	— (Note: "The Seeker" did not enter the Billboard Hot 100, but peaked at number 105 on the Bubbling Under the Hot 100 chart in the issue dated August 23, 1975.)	—	2	—	—	—	—	1	—		Dolly
"We Used To"	1975	—	—	9	—	—	—	—	4	—		Dolly
"Hey, Lucky Lady"	1976	—	—	19	—	—	—	—	11	—		All I Can Do
"All I Can Do"	1976	—	—	3	—	—	—	—	1	—		All I Can Do
"Shattered Image"	1976	—	—	—	—	—	—	—	—	—		All I Can Do
"You Are"	1977	—	—	—	—	—	—	—	—	—		New Harvest...First Gathering
"Light of a Clear Blue Morning"	1977	87	—	11	—	—	—	—	4	—		New Harvest...First Gathering
"Applejack"	1977	—	—	—	—	—	—	—	—	—		New Harvest...First Gathering
"(Your Love Keeps Lifting Me) Higher and Higher"	1977	—	—	—	—	—	—	—	—	—		New Harvest...First Gathering
"Here You Come Again"	1977	3	2	1	—	10	7	1	1	75	RIAA: Platinum; ARIA: Gold; BPI: Gold; RMNZ: Gold	Here You Come Again
"Two Doors Down"	1978	19	12	—	—	—	26	7	—	—		Here You Come Again
"It's All Wrong, But It's All Right"	1978	—	—	1	—	—	—	—	1	—		Here You Come Again
"Heartbreaker"	1978	37	12	1	—	—	41	1	1	—		Heartbreaker
"It's Too Late to Love Me Now"	1978	—	—	—	—	—	—	—	—	—		Heartbreaker
"Baby I'm Burnin'"	1978	25	11	48	15	34	30	9	1	—		Heartbreaker
"I Really Got the Feeling"	1978	—	—	1	—	—	—	—	—	—		Heartbreaker
"You're the Only One"	1979	59	14	1	—	33	63	1	1	—		Great Balls of Fire
"Great Balls of Fire"	1979	—	—	—	—	—	—	—	—	—		Great Balls of Fire
"Sweet Summer Lovin'"	1979	77	41	7	—	—	—	8	6	—		Great Balls of Fire
"Star of the Show"	1979	—	—	—	—	99	—	—	—	—		Great Balls of Fire
"—" denotes a recording that did not chart or was not released in that territory.

=== 1980s ===
List of singles, with selected chart positions, showing other relevant details
Title	Year	Peak chart positions									Certifications (sales thresholds)	Album
Title	Year	US	US AC	US Cou.	US Dan.	AUS	CAN	CAN AC	CAN Cou.	UK	Certifications (sales thresholds)	Album
"Starting Over Again"	1980	36	35	1	—	—	—	—	2	—		Dolly, Dolly, Dolly
"Me and Little Andy"	1980	—	—	—	—	—	—	—	—	—		Here You Come Again
"Old Flames Can't Hold a Candle to You"	1980	—	—	1	—	—	—	—	2	—		Dolly, Dolly, Dolly
"Packin' It Up"	1980	—	—	—	—	—	—	—	—	—		Dolly, Dolly, Dolly
"9 to 5"	1980	1	1	1	77	9	1	—	1	5 (Note: "9 to 5" originally peaked at number 47 on the UK Singles Chart in 1981. After Parton's death in August 2026, "9 to 5" reached a new peak of number 5.)	RIAA: 3× Platinum; ARIA: 7× Platinum; BPI: 4× Platinum; MC: 3× Platinum; RMNZ: 5× Platinum	9 to 5 and Odd Jobs
"But You Know I Love You"	1981	41	14	1	—	—	—	—	2	—		9 to 5 and Odd Jobs
"The House of the Rising Sun"	1981	77	30	14	—	—	—	—	20	—		9 to 5 and Odd Jobs
"Working Girl"	1981	—	—	—	—	—	—	—	—	—		9 to 5 and Odd Jobs
"Single Women"	1982	—	—	8	—	—	—	—	1	—		Heartbreak Express
"Heartbreak Express"	1982	—	—	7	—	—	—	—	1	—		Heartbreak Express
"I Will Always Love You" (re-recording)	1982	53	17	1	—	72	8	2	1	—		The Best Little Whorehouse in Texas
"Do I Ever Cross Your Mind"	1982	—	—	—	—	—	—	—	—	—		Heartbreak Express
"Hard Candy Christmas"	1982	—	—	8	—	—	—	—	27	—	RIAA: Gold	The Best Little Whorehouse in Texas
"Everything's Beautiful (In Its Own Way)" (with Willie Nelson)	1982	102	19	7	—	—	—	2	—	—		The Winning Hand
"Potential New Boyfriend"	1983	—	—	20	14	53	—	—	13	—		Burlap & Satin
"Save the Last Dance for Me"	1983	45	12	3	—	31	—	3	2	—		The Great Pretender
"Downtown"	1984	80	20	36	—	—	—	8	20	—		The Great Pretender
"She Don't Love You (Like I Love You)"	1984	—	—	—	—	—	—	—	—	—		The Great Pretender
"Tennessee Homesick Blues"	1984	—	—	1	—	—	—	—	1	—		Rhinestone
"Sweet Lovin' Friends" (with Sylvester Stallone)	1984	—	—	—	—	—	—	—	—	—		Rhinestone
"God Won't Get You"	1984	—	—	10	—	—	—	—	8	—		Rhinestone
"What a Heartache"	1984	—	—	—	—	—	—	—	—	—		Rhinestone
"Medley: Winter Wonderland / Sleigh Ride"	1984	—	—	70	—	—	—	—	—	—		Once Upon a Christmas
"The Greatest Gift of All" (with Kenny Rogers)	1984	81	40	53	—	—	—	—	—	—		Once Upon a Christmas
"Don't Call It Love"	1985	—	12	3	—	—	—	15	5	—		Real Love
"Real Love" (duet with Kenny Rogers)	1985	91	13	1	—	45	—	19	1	—		Real Love
"Think About Love"	1985	—	—	1	—	74	—	—	1	—		Real Love
"Christmas Without You" (with Kenny Rogers)	1985	—	—	—	—	—	—	—	—	88		Once Upon a Christmas
"Almost in Love"	1986	—	—	—	—	—	—	—	—	—		The Love Album 2
"Tie Our Love (In a Double Knot)"	1986	—	—	17	—	—	—	—	20	—		Real Love
"We Had It All"	1986	—	—	31	—	—	—	—	30	—		Think About Love
"To Know Him Is to Love Him" (with Emmylou Harris and Linda Ronstadt)	1987	—	—	1	—	54	—	—	1	—		Trio
"Telling Me Lies" (with Emmylou Harris and Linda Ronstadt)	1987	—	35	3	—	—	—	—	6	—		Trio
"Those Memories of You" (with Emmylou Harris and Linda Ronstadt)	1987	—	—	5	—	—	—	—	1	—		Trio
"I Believe in Santa Claus" (with Kenny Rogers)	1987	—	—	—	—	—	—	—	—	—		Once Upon a Christmas
"The River Unbroken"	1987	—	43	63	—	—	—	23	51	—		Rainbow
"I Know You by Heart" (duet with Smokey Robinson)	1988	—	22	—	—	—	—	—	—	—		Rainbow
"Wildflowers" (with Emmylou Harris and Linda Ronstadt)	1988	—	—	6	—	—	—	—	8	—		Trio
"Make Love Work"	1988	—	—	—	—	—	—	—	—	—		Rainbow
"Why'd You Come in Here Lookin' Like That"	1989	—	—	1	—	—	—	—	1	—		White Limozeen
"Yellow Roses"	1989	—	—	1	—	—	—	—	1	—		White Limozeen
"He's Alive"	1989	—	—	39	—	—	—	—	49	—		White Limozeen
"—" denotes a recording that did not chart or was not released in that territory.

=== 1990s ===
List of singles, with selected chart positions, showing other relevant details
Title	Year	Peak chart positions							Album
Title	Year	US	US AC	US Cou.	US Dan.	AUS	CAN Cou.	UK	Album
"Time for Me to Fly"	1990	—	—	39	—	—	39	—	White Limozeen
"White Limozeen"	1990	—	—	29	—	—	47	—	White Limozeen
"Slow Healing Heart"	1990	—	—	—	—	—	—	—	White Limozeen
"Rockin' Years" (duet with Ricky Van Shelton)	1991	—	—	1	—	—	1	—	Eagle When She Flies
"Silver and Gold"	1991	—	—	15	—	—	7	—	Eagle When She Flies
"Eagle When She Flies"	1991	—	—	33	—	—	9	—	Eagle When She Flies
"Country Road"	1992	—	—	46	—	—	33	—	Eagle When She Flies
"Straight Talk"	1992	—	—	64	—	194	—	—	Straight Talk: Music from the Original Motion Picture Soundtrack
"Light of a Clear Blue Morning"	1992	—	—	—	—	—	—	—	Straight Talk: Music from the Original Motion Picture Soundtrack
"Burning" (with Les Taylor)	1992	—	—	—	—	—	—	—	Straight Talk: Music from the Original Motion Picture Soundtrack
"Romeo" (with Billy Ray Cyrus, Tanya Tucker, Mary Chapin Carpenter, Kathy Mattea and Pam Tillis)	1993	50	—	27	—	—	33	—	Slow Dancing with the Moon
"More Where That Came From"	1993	—	—	58	—	—	—	—	Slow Dancing with the Moon
"Full Circle"	1993	—	—	—	—	—	—	—	Slow Dancing with the Moon
"Silver Threads and Golden Needles" (with Loretta Lynn and Tammy Wynette)	1993	—	—	68	—	—	—	—	Honky Tonk Angels
"The Day I Fall in Love" (with James Ingram)	1993	—	36	—	—	188	—	64	Beethoven's 2nd: Music from the Original Motion Picture Soundtrack
"To Daddy" (Live)	1994	—	—	—	—	—	—	—	Heartsongs: Live from Home
"I Will Always Love You" (with special guest Vince Gill)	1995	—	—	15	—	—	22	—	Something Special
"Just When I Needed You Most"	1996	—	—	62	—	—	68	—	Treasures
"Peace Train"	1997	— (Note: "Peace Train" did not enter the Billboard Hot 100, but peaked at No. 19 on the Bubbling Under Hot 100 Singles chart in the issue dated July 26, 1997.)	—	—	23	166	—	86	Treasures
"Something Bigger Than Me"	1997	—	—	—	—	—	—	—	Annabelle's Wish
"Honky Tonk Songs"	1998	—	—	74	—	—	91	—	Hungry Again
"The Salt in My Tears"	1998	—	—	—	—	—	—	—	Hungry Again
"High Sierra" (with Emmylou Harris and Linda Ronstadt)	1999	—	—	—	—	—	90	—	Trio II
"After the Gold Rush" (with Emmylou Harris and Linda Ronstadt)	1999	—	—	—	—	—	—	—	Trio II
"Feels Like Home" (with Emmylou Harris and Linda Ronstadt)	1999	—	—	—	—	—	—	—	Trio II
"Do I Ever Cross Your Mind" (with Emmylou Harris and Linda Ronstadt)	1999	—	—	—	—	—	—	—	Trio II
"Walking on Sunshine"	1999	—	—	—	—	—	—	—	Treasures
"A Few Old Memories"	1999	—	—	—	—	—	—	—	The Grass Is Blue
"—" denotes a recording that did not chart or was not released in that territory.

=== 2000s ===
List of singles, with selected chart positions, showing other relevant details
Title	Year	Peak chart positions		Album
Title	Year	US Cou.	UK	Album
"Silver Dagger"	2000	—	—	The Grass Is Blue
"A Tender Lie"	2001	—	—	Little Sparrow
"Bluer Pastures"	2001	—	—	Little Sparrow
"Seven Bridges Road"	2001	—	—	Little Sparrow
"Shine"	2001	—	—	Little Sparrow
"Dagger Through the Heart"	2002	—	—	Halos & Horns
"If"	2002	—	73	Halos & Horns
"Hello God"	2002	60	—	Halos & Horns
"I'm Gone"	2003	—	—	Halos & Horns
"Welcome Home"	2003	—	—	For God and Country
"Light of a Clear Blue Morning"	2004	—	—	For God and Country
"Imagine" (with special guest David Foster)	2005	—	—	Those Were the Days
"Both Sides Now" (with special guests Judy Collins and Rhonda Vincent)	2005	—	—	Those Were the Days
"Twelfth of Never" (with special guest Keith Urban)	2006	—	—	Those Were the Days
"Travelin' Thru"	2006	—	—	Transamerica
"Where Do the Children Play" (with special guest Yusuf Islam)	2006	—	—	Those Were the Days
"Better Get to Livin'"	2007	48	—	Backwoods Barbie
"Jesus & Gravity"	2008	56	—	Backwoods Barbie
"Shinola"	2008	—	—	Backwoods Barbie
"Drives Me Crazy"	2009	—	—	Backwoods Barbie
"Backwoods Barbie"	2009	—	—	Backwoods Barbie
"Change It" (featuring the Cast of 9 to 5: The Musical)	2009	—	—	Non-album single
"Tell Me That You Love Me" (with Kenny Rogers)	2009	—	—	The First 50 Years
"Here You Come Again" (Live)	2009	—	—	Live from London
"Comin' Home for Christmas"	2009	—	—	Non-album single
"—" denotes a recording that did not chart or was not released in that territory.

=== 2010s ===
List of singles, with selected chart positions, showing other relevant details
Title	Year	Peak chart positions						Certifications (sales thresholds)	Album
Title	Year	US	US Chr.	US Cou.	US Dan.	CAN Dig.	UK	Certifications (sales thresholds)	Album
"Together You and I"	2011	—	—	—	—	—	67		Better Day
"The Sacrifice"	2011	—	—	—	—	—	—		Better Day
"He's Everything" (with Queen Latifah, Keke Palmer, Jeremy Jordan, Andy Karl and DeQuina Moore)	2011	—	—	—	—	—	—		Joyful Noise: Original Motion Picture Soundtrack
"From Here to the Moon and Back" (with Kris Kristofferson and Jeremy Jordan)	2012	—	— (Note: "From Here to the Moon and Back" did not enter the Hot Christian Songs chart but peaked at number two on the Christian Digital Song Sales chart.)	—	—	—	—		Joyful Noise: Original Motion Picture Soundtrack
"Higher Melody" (with Queen Latifah, Keke Palmer, Jeremy Jordan, DeQuinna Moore, Angela Groves, and Andy Karl)	2012	—	— (Note: "Higher Melody" did not enter the Hot Christian Songs chart but peaked at number four on the Christian Digital Song Sales chart.)	—	—	—	—		Joyful Noise: Original Motion Picture Soundtrack
"Blue Smoke"	2013	—	—	—	—	—	—		Blue Smoke
"Home"	2014	—	—	—	—	—	—		Blue Smoke
"Try"	2014	—	—	—	—	—	—		Blue Smoke
"Unlikely Angel"	2015	—	—	—	—	—	—		Blue Smoke
"Do I Ever Cross Your Mind" (Alternate Take) (with Emmylou Harris and Linda Ronstadt)	2016	—	—	—	—	—	—		The Complete Trio Collection
"Pure and Simple"	2016	—	—	—	—	—	—		Pure & Simple
"Outside Your Door"	2016	—	—	—		——	—		Pure & Simple
"Wildflowers" (Alternate Take) (with Emmylou Harris and Linda Ronstadt)	2016	—	—	—	—	—	—		The Complete Trio Collection
"Calling My Children Home" (with Emmylou Harris and Linda Ronstadt)	2016	—	—	—	—	—	—		The Complete Trio Collection
"Waltz Across Texas Tonight" (with Emmylou Harris and Linda Ronstadt)	2016	—	—	—	—	—	—		The Complete Trio Collection
"More Power to Ya" (with Stella Parton)	2016	—	—	—	—	—	—		Mountain Songbird
"Head Over High Heels"	2016	—	—	—	—	—	—		Pure & Simple
"The Story"	2017	—	—	—	—	—	—		Cover Stories
"I Believe in You"	2017	—	—	—	—	—	—		I Believe in You
"The Last Word in Lonesome Is Me" (featuring Alison Krauss)	2018	—	—	—	—	—	—		King of the Road: A Tribute to Roger Miller
"Here I Am" (with Sia)	2018	— (Note: "Here I Am" did not enter the Billboard Hot 100 but peaked at number 27 on the Digital Song Sales chart.)	—	37	—	—	—		Dumplin'
"Girl in the Movies"	2018	—	—	—	—	—	—		Dumplin'
"Jolene" (New String Version)	2018	—	—	—	—	—	—		Dumplin'
"I Will Always Love You" (with Kristin Chenoweth)	2019	—	—	—	—	—	—		For the Girls
"God Only Knows" (with For King & Country)	2019	—	— (Note: "God Only Knows" did not enter the Hot Christian Songs chart but peaked at number 41 on the Christian Airplay chart.)	—	—	—	—		Non-album single
"There Was Jesus" (with Zach Williams)	2019	— (Note: "There Was Jesus" did not enter the Billboard Hot 100 but peaked at number eight on the Bubbling Under Hot 100.)	2	—	—	—	—	RIAA: Platinum	Rescue Story
"Faith" (with Galantis featuring Mr Probz)	2019	— (Note: "Faith" did not enter the Billboard Hot 100 but peaked at number 45 on the Digital Song Sales chart.)	—	—	13	32	—	RIAA: Gold; MC: Platinum	Church
"—" denotes a recording that did not chart or was not released in that territory.

=== 2020s ===
List of singles, with selected chart positions, showing other relevant details
Title	Year	Peak chart positions										Album
Title	Year	US Dig.	US AC	US Chr.	US Cou.	US Hol. Dig.	US Rock	CAN AC	CAN Cou.	CAN Dig.	UK	Album
"When Life Is Good Again"	2020	— (Note: "When Life Is Good Again" did not enter the Billboard Hot 100 but peaked at number 31 on the Digital Song Sales chart.)	—	—	— (Note: "When Life Is Good Again" did not enter the Billboard Hot Country Songs chart, but peaked at number 11 on the Country Digital Song Sales chart.)	—	—	—	—	—	—	Non-album single
"Mary, Did You Know?"	2020	—	—	49	—	—	—	—	—	—	—	A Holly Dolly Christmas
"I Saw Mommy Kissing Santa Claus"	2020	—	—	—	—	—	—	—	—	—	—	A Holly Dolly Christmas
"Christmas on the Square"	2020	—	—	—	—	49	—	—	—	—	—	A Holly Dolly Christmas
"Cuddle Up, Cozy Down Christmas" (with Michael Bublé)	2020	—	10	—	48	3	—	4	48	—	55	A Holly Dolly Christmas
"Pink" (with Monica, Jordin Sparks, Rita Wilson, and Sara Evans)	2020	—	—	—	—	—	—	—	—	—	—	Non-album single
"I Still Believe"	2020	—	—	—	— (Note: "I Still Believe" did not enter the Billboard Hot Country Songs chart, but peaked at number 22 on the Country Digital Song Sales chart.)	32	—	—	—	—	—	A Holly Dolly Christmas
"5 to 9"	2021	—	—	—	—	—	—	—	—	—	—	Non-album singles
"Sent from Above"	2021	—	—	—	—	—	—	—	—	—	—	Non-album singles
"In the Sweet By and By" (with Larry Cordle, Carl Jackson, Jerry Salley, and Bradley Walker)	2021	—	—	—	—	—	—	—	—	—	—	Country Faith Bluegrass
"Big Dreams and Faded Jeans"	2022	—	—	—	—	—	—	—	—	—	—	Run, Rose, Run
"Blue Bonnet Breeze"	2022	—	—	—	—	—	—	—	—	—	—	Run, Rose, Run
"Woman Up (And Take It Like a Man)"	2022	—	—	—	—	—	—	—	—	—	—	Run, Rose, Run
"A Smoky Mountain Christmas"	2022	—	—	—	—	—	—	—	—	—	—	A Holly Dolly Christmas
"9 to 5" (with Kelly Clarkson)	2022	15	—	—	— (Note: "9 to 5" did not enter the Billboard Hot Country Songs chart, but peaked at number 6 on the Country Digital Song Sales chart.)	—	—	—	—	46	—	Non-album single
"Silent Night"	2022	—	—	—	—	—	—	—	—	—	—	A Holly Dolly Christmas
"Almost Too Early for Christmas" (with Jimmy Fallon)	2022	—	30	—	—	32	—	—	—	—	—	Holiday Seasoning
"Bets on Us" (with Cheat Codes)	2023	—	—	—	—	—	—	—	—	—	—	One Night in Nashville
"Don't Make Me Have to Come Down There"	2023	—	—	—	— (Note: "Don't Make Me Have to Come Down There" did not enter the Billboard Hot Country Songs chart, but peaked at number 23 on the Country Digital Song Sales chart.)	—	—	—	—	—	—	Non-album single
"Gonna Be You" (with Belinda Carlisle, Cyndi Lauper, Gloria Estefan and Debbie Harry)	2023	42	—	—	—	—	—	—	—	—	—	80 for Brady
"Jolene" (re-recorded with Olivia Newton-John)	2023	—	—	—	— (Note: "Jolene" did not enter the Billboard Hot Country Songs chart, but peaked at number 13 on the Country Digital Song Sales chart.)	—	—	—	—	—	—	Just the Two of Us: The Duets Collection (Vol. 1)
"Peace Like a River" (with Dionne Warwick)	2023	—	—	— (Note: "Peace Like a River" did not enter the Hot Christian Songs chart but peaked at number 22 on the Christian Digital Song Sales chart.)	—	—	—	—	—	—	—	Non-album singles
"Satisfied" (with Vestal Goodman)	2023	—	—	—	—	—	—	—	—	—	—	Non-album singles
"Seasons" (with Bebe Rexha)	2023	—	—	—	—	—	—	—	—	—	—	Bebe
"World on Fire"	2023	4	—	—	— (Note: "World on Fire" did not enter the Billboard Hot Country Songs chart, but peaked at number 3 on the Country Digital Song Sales chart.)	—	21	—	—	16	— (Note: "World on Fire" did not enter the UK Singles Top 100 but debuted and peaked at number 78 on the UK Singles Downloads Chart on 19 May 2023.)	Rockstar
"Magic Man" (featuring Ann Wilson)	2023	—	—	—	—	—	— (Note: "Magic Man" did not enter the Hot Rock & Alternative Songs chart but peaked at number 25 on the Rock Digital Song Sales chart.)	—	—	—	—	Rockstar
"Bygones" (featuring Rob Halford)	2023	—	—	—	—	—	— (Note: "Bygones" did not enter the Hot Rock & Alternative Songs chart but peaked at number 19 on the Hard Rock Digital Song Sales chart.)	—	—	—	—	Rockstar
"We Are the Champions/We Will Rock You"	2023	—	—	—	—	—	—	—	—	—	—	Rockstar
"Step by Step" (with Natalie Grant)	2023	—	13	—	—	—	—	—	—	—	—	Seasons
"Let It Be" (featuring Paul McCartney and Ringo Starr)	2023	22	—	—	—	— (Note: "Let It Be" did not enter the Billboard Hot Country Songs chart, but peaked at number 15 on the Country Digital Song Sales chart.)	— (Note: "Let It Be" did not enter the Hot Rock & Alternative Songs chart but peaked at number two on the Rock Digital Song Sales chart.)	—	—	43	—	Rockstar
"What's Up?" (featuring Linda Perry)	2023	—	—	—	—	— (Note: "What's Up?" did not enter the Hot Rock & Alternative Songs chart but peaked at number 14 on the Rock Digital Song Sales chart.)	—	—	—	—	—	Rockstar
"Wrecking Ball" (featuring Miley Cyrus)	2023	—	—	—	— (Note: "Wrecking Ball" did not enter the Billboard Hot Country Songs chart, but peaked at number 13 on the Country Digital Song Sales chart.)	—	— (Note: "Wrecking Ball" did not enter the Hot Rock & Alternative Songs chart but peaked at number six on the Rock Digital Song Sales chart.)	—	—	—	—	Rockstar
"Southern Accents"	2024	—	—	—	—	—	—	—	—	—	—	Petty Country: A Country Music Celebration of Tom Petty
"Somebody's Child" (Blessing Offor with Dolly Parton)	2024	—	—	41	—	—	—	—	—	—	—	Real
"The Orchard" (with Jada Star)	2024	—	—	—	—	—	—	—	—	—	—	Smoky Mountain DNA: Family, Faith and Fables
"Tell Me That You Love Me" (with Richie Owens)	2024	—	—	—	—	—	—	—	—	—	—	Smoky Mountain DNA: Family, Faith and Fables
"Smoky Mountain DNA"	2024	—	—	—	—	—	—	—	—	—	—	Smoky Mountain DNA: Family, Faith and Fables
"A Rose Won't Fix It" (with Heidi Parton)	2024	—	—	—	—	—	—	—	—	—	—	Smoky Mountain DNA: Family, Faith and Fables
"I Will Know" (with Rachel Parton George)	2024	—	—	—	—	—	—	—	—	—	—	Smoky Mountain DNA: Family, Faith and Fables
"When Possession Gets Too Strong" (with Louis Owens)	2024	—	—	—	—	—	—	—	—	—	—	Smoky Mountain DNA: Family, Faith and Fables
"Not Bad" (with Shelley Rena)	2024	—	—	—	—	—	—	—	—	—	—	Smoky Mountain DNA: Family, Faith and Fables
"Til The Last Shot's Fired" (Scotty Hasting with Lee Brice and Dolly Parton)	2024	—	—	—	—	—	—	—	—	—	—	Non-album singles
"If You Hadn't Been There"	2025	3	—	—	—	—	—	—	—	—	— (Note: "If You Hadn't Been There" did not enter the UK Singles Chart Top 100, but debuted and peaked at number 21 on both the UK Singles Downloads and UK Singles Sales charts, respectively.)	Non-album singles
"Broken Angels" (The Grascals and Dolly Parton)	2025	—	—	—	—	—	—	—	—	—	—	Non-album singles
"Bella"	2025	—	—	—	—	—	—	—	—	—	—	Non-album singles
"Light of a Clear Blue Morning" (featuring Lainey Wilson, Miley Cyrus, Queen Latifah and Reba McEntire)	2026	2	—	—	—	—	—	—	—	—	— (Note: "Light of a Clear Blue Morning" did not enter the UK Singles Chart Top 100, but peaked at number 10 on the UK Singles Sales Chart.)	Non-album singles
"Son of Jolene" (Belles with Dolly Parton)	2026	—	—	—	— (Note: "Son of Jolene" did not enter the Hot Country Songs chart, but peaked at No. 11 on the Country Digital Song Sales chart in the issue dated May 2, 2026.)	—	—	—	—	—	— (Note: "Son of Jolene" did not enter the UK Singles Chart Top 100, but peaked at number 80 on the UK Singles Sales Chart.)	Non-album singles
"Bound to Ride" (with the First Ladies of Blue Grass)	2026	—	—	—	—	—	—	—	—	—	—	Where the Soul Never Dies: Celebrating 80 Years of The Stanley Brothers
"—" denotes a recording that did not chart or was not released in that territory.

== As featured artist ==
List of singles, with selected chart positions, showing other relevant details
Title	Year	Peak chart positions										Certifications (sales thresholds)	Album
Title	Year	US	US AC	US Chr. Dig.	US Cou.	US Cou. Air.	AUS	CAN	CAN AC	CAN Cou.	UK	Certifications (sales thresholds)	Album
"Friends Tell Friends" (Bill Phillips with Dolly Parton)	1965	—	—	—	—	—	—	—	—	—	—		Bill Phillips Style
"Put It Off Until Tomorrow" (Bill Phillips with Dolly Parton)	1966	—	—	—	6	—	—	—	—	—	—		Put It Off Until Tomorrow
"Mathilda (I Cry and Cry for You)" (John Henry III and the Country Blues with Dolly Parton)	1970	—	—	—	—	—	—	—	—	—	—		Non-album single
"Light of the Stable" (Emmylou Harris with Dolly Parton, Linda Ronstadt and Neil Young)	1975	—	—	—	99	—	—	—	—	—	—		Light of the Stable
"I Never Will Marry" (Linda Ronstadt with Dolly Parton)	1978	—	30	—	8	—	—	—	39	16	—		Simple Dreams
"Islands in the Stream" (Kenny Rogers duet with Dolly Parton)	1983	1	1	—	1	—	1	1	1	1	7	RIAA: 3× Platinum; ARIA: Platinum; BPI: 3× Platinum; MC: 3× Platinum; RMNZ: 7× Platinum	Eyes That See in the Dark
"Unwed Fathers" (Gail Davies with Dolly Parton)	1985	—	—	—	56	—	—	—	—	—	—		Where Is a Woman to Go
"Love Is Strange" (Kenny Rogers duet with Dolly Parton)	1990	—	—	—	21	21	145	—	—	14	—		Love Is Strange
"When You Tell Me That You Love Me" (Julio Iglesias featuring Dolly Parton)	1995	—	—	—	—	—	—	—	—	—	—		Crazy
"Knockin' on Heaven's Door" (Ladysmith Black Mambazo featuring Dolly Parton)	1997	—	—	—	—	—	—	—	—	—	—		Heavenly
"Sleepless Nights" (The Nobles with Dolly Parton)	1998	—	—	—	—	—	—	—	—	—	—		Slow Glowin' Dream
"Your Kisses Are Charity" (Dolly Mix) (Culture Club featuring Dolly Parton)	1999	—	—	—	—	—	—	—	—	—	25		Non-album single
"God's Colouring Book" (Margo O'Donnell featuring Dolly Parton)	1999	—	—	—	—	—	—	—	—	—	—		Highway of My Life
"Two of the Lucky Ones" (Hal Ketchum with Dolly Parton)	2001	—	—	—	—	—	—	—	—	—	—		Lucky Man
"Stand by the River" (Dottie Rambo duet with Dolly Parton)	2002	—	—	—	—	—	—	—	—	—	—		Stand by the River
"Steady as the Rain" (The Larkins with Dolly Parton)	2003	—	—	—	—	—	—	—	—	—	—		The Larkins
"High and Mighty" (Aaron Crisler featuring Dolly Parton)	2004	—	—	—	—	—	—	—	—	—	—		In Good Hands
"Creepin' In" (Norah Jones with Dolly Parton)	2004	—	—	—	—	—	—	—	—	—	—		Feels Like Home
"Viva Las Vegas" (The Grascals with special guest Dolly Parton)	2004	—	—	—	—	—	—	—	—	—	—		The Grascals
"Baby, It's Cold Outside" (Rod Stewart duet with Dolly Parton)	2004	—	2	—	—	—	—	—	—	—	—		Stardust: The Great American Songbook, Volume III
"Angels and Eagles" (Kim McLean with Dolly Parton)	2005	—	—	—	—	—	—	—	—	—	—		Happy Face
"Thank God I'm a Country Boy" (Roy Rivers featuring Dolly Parton)	2005	—	—	—	—	—	—	—	—	—	—		Thank God I'm a Country Boy
"It Looked Good on Paper" (Randy Kohrs duet with Dolly Parton)	2005	—	—	—	—	—	—	—	—	—	—		I'm Torn
"If I Said You Had a Beautiful Body (Would You Hold It Against Me)" (The Bellamy Brothers with Dolly Parton)	2005	—	—	—	60	60	—	—	—	—	—		Angels and Outlaws Vol. 1
"The Blues Man" (George Jones featuring Dolly Parton)	2005	—	—	—	—	—	—	—	—	—	—		Hits I Missed...And One I Didn't
"When I Get Where I'm Going" (Brad Paisley featuring Dolly Parton)	2005	39	—	2	1	1	—	—	—	—	—	RIAA: Platinum; MC: Platinum	Time Well Wasted
"I Still Miss Someone" (Martina McBride with Dolly Parton)	2006	—	—	—	50	50	—	—	—	—	—		Timeless
"Heartbreaker's Alibi" (Rhonda Vincent duet with Dolly Parton)	2006	—	—	—	—	—	—	—	—	—	—		All American Bluegrass Girl
"Tomorrow Is Forever" (Solomon Burke featuring Dolly Parton)	2006	—	—	—	—	—	—	—	—	—	—		Nashville
"To Daddy" (Tom Astor featuring Dolly Parton)	2008	—	—	—	—	—	—	—	—	—	—		Alles klar - kein Problem!
"Gold" (Emmylou Harris with Dolly Parton and Vince Gill)	2008	—	—	—	—	—	—	—	—	—	—		All I Intended to Be
"Boots and Sand" (Yusuf with Paul McCartney and Dolly Parton)	2009	—	—	—	—	—	—	—	—	—	—		Roadsinger
"I Am Strong" (The Grascals with Dolly Parton)	2011	—	—	—	—	—	—	—	—	—	—		Country Classics with a Bluegrass Spin
"From Here to the Moon and Back" (Willie Nelson featuring Dolly Parton)	2013	—	—	—	—	—	—	—	—	—	—		To All the Girls...
"You Can't Make Old Friends" (Kenny Rogers duet with Dolly Parton)	2013	— (Note: "You Can't Make Old Friends" did not enter the Billboard Hot 100 but peaked at number 28 on the Digital Song Sales chart.)	—	—	—	57	—	—	—	—	—		You Can't Make Old Friends
"When I Stop Dreaming" (Don Henley featuring Dolly Parton)	2015	—	—	—	—	—	—	—	—	—	—		Cass County
"My Father's Daughter" (Jewel featuring Dolly Parton)	2015	—	—	—	—	—	—	—	—	—	—		Picking Up the Pieces
"Forever Country" (Artists of Then, Now & Forever)	2016	21	—	—	1	32	26	—	—	45			Non-album single
"Jolene" (Pentatonix featuring Dolly Parton)	2016	— (Note: "Jolene" did not enter the Billboard Hot 100, but peaked at No. 1 on the Bubbling Under Hot 100 Singles chart in the issue dated October 8, 2016.)	—	18	—	—	92	—	—	—	—		PTX, Vol. IV - Classics
"Born Again Wildflower" (Debbie Cochran featuring Dolly Parton)	2017	—	—	—	—	—	—	—	—	—	—		Born Again Wildflower
"Smoky Mountain Rain" (Ronnie Milsap featuring Dolly Parton)	2019	—	27	—	—	—	—	—	—	—	—		The Duets
"Words" (Barry Gibb featuring Dolly Parton)	2021	—	—	—	—	—	—	—	—	—	—		Greenfields: The Gibb Brothers' Songbook, Vol. 1
"Hand Me Downs" (Janelle Arthur featuring Dolly Parton)	2021	—	—	—	—	—	—	—	—	—	—		Non-album single
"One Angel" (Rory Feek featuring Dolly Parton)	2021	—	—	—	—	—	—	—	—	—	—		Gentle Man
"Happy All the Time" (Sam Williams featuring Dolly Parton)	2021	—	—	—	—	—	—	—	—	—	—		Glasshouse Children
"Eagle When She Flies" (José Feliciano featuring Dolly Parton)	2021	—	—	—	—	—	—	—	—	—	—		Behind This Guitar
"Does He Love You" (Reba McEntire featuring Dolly Parton)	2021	—	—	—	47	49	—	—	—	—	—		Revived Remixed Revisited
"The Seeker" (Julie and Dan featuring Dolly Parton)	2022	—	—	—	—	—	—	—	—	—	—		Hymns: Some of Old, Some of New
"Someday It'll All Make Sense" (Bill Anderson featuring Dolly Parton)	2022	—	—	—	—	—	—	—	—	—	—		As Far as I Can See: The Best of Bill Anderson
"Two Doors Down" (Positive Vibrations featuring Dolly Parton)	2022	—	—	—	—	—	—	—	—	—	—		Country Goes Reggae
"21 Forever" (with Chris Janson and Slash)	2023	—	—	—	—	—	—	—	—	—	—		The Outlaw Side of Me
"Forever Young" (with Daniel Grindstaff and Paul Brewster)	2023	—	—	—	—	—	—	—	—	—	—		Heroes and Friends
"Powerful Women" (Pitbull with Dolly Parton)	2024	— (Note: "Powerful Women" did not enter the Billboard Hot 100, but peaked at No. 8 on the Digital Song Sales chart in the issue dated April 20, 2024.)	—	—	—	—	—	—	—	—	—		Trackhouse (Daytona 500 Edition)
"Tyrant" (Beyoncé with Dolly Parton)	2024	44	—	—	12	—	—	71	—	—	83		Cowboy Carter
"Have the Heart" (Post Malone with Dolly Parton)	2024	56	—	—	22	—	—	44	—	—	—		F-1 Trillion
"Oh What A Night" (Heidi Parton featuring Dolly Parton)	2024	—	—	—	—	—	—	—	—	—	—		Non-album singles
"You'll Never Walk Alone" (Demaree featuring Dolly Parton)	2025	—	—	—	—	—	—	—	—	—	—		Non-album singles
"Friends!" (The Wiggles with Dolly Parton)	2025	—	—	—	—	—	—	—	—	—	—		Wiggle Up, Giddy Up!
"Please Please Please" (Sabrina Carpenter featuring Dolly Parton)	2025	—	—	—	17	—	—	—	—	—	—		Short n' Sweet (Deluxe)
"Home Sweet Home" (Mötley Crüe featuring Dolly Parton)	2025	—	—	— (Note: "Home Sweet Home" did not enter the Christian Digital Song Sales chart, but peaked at No. 4 on the Hard Rock Digital Song Sales chart in the issue dated July 5, 2025.)	— (Note: "Home Sweet Home" did not enter the Hot Country Songs chart, but peaked at No. 21 on the Hot Hard Rock Songs chart in the issue dated July 5, 2025.)	—	—	—	—	—	—		From the Beginning
"Butterfly" (Zac Brown Band featuring Dolly Parton)	2025	— (Note: "Butterfly" did not enter the Billboard Hot 100, but peaked at No. 8 on the Digital Song Sales chart in the issue dated September 20, 2025.)	—	—	— (Note: "Butterfly" did not enter the Hot Country Songs chart, but peaked at No. 1 on the Country Digital Song Sales chart in the issue dated September 20, 2025.)	—	—	—	—	—	—		Love & Fear
"In the Pines" (Renée Fleming and Béla Fleck featuring Dolly Parton)	2026	—	—	—	—	—	—	—	—	—	—		The Fiddle and the Drum
"Torn" (U2 featuring Dolly Parton)	2026	—	—	—	—	28	—	—	—	—	—		Carnaval de Luz
"—" denotes a recording that did not chart or was not released in that territory.

== Promotional singles ==
Title	Year	Album
"O Chestnut Tree" (with Bill Owens)	2012	Non-album single
"I Believe in You"	2014	I Believe in You
"Mama"	2016	Pure & Simple
"Makin' Fun Ain't Funny"	2016	I Believe in You
"I'm Gone" (Note: Re-released as a promotional single to promote the digital re-release of Little Sparrow, Halos & Horns, For God and Country, Live and Well, Those Were the Days, and Better Day.)	2020	Halos & Horns
"The Fall" / "I Don't Care"	2021	Songteller: My Life in Lyrics

== Other charted songs ==
List of songs, with selected chart positions, showing other relevant details
Title	Year	Peak chart positions			Album
Title	Year	US Cou.	US Hol. Dig.	US Rock Dig.	Album
"PMS Blues" (Live)	1994	70	—	—	Heartsongs: Live from Home
"Holly Jolly Christmas"	2020	—	16	—	A Holly Dolly Christmas
"Christmas Is" (featuring Miley Cyrus)	2020	—	13	—	A Holly Dolly Christmas
"Circle of Love"	2020	—	8	—	A Holly Dolly Christmas
"All I Want for Christmas is You" (featuring Jimmy Fallon)	2020	—	4	—	A Holly Dolly Christmas
"Comin' Home for Christmas"	2020	—	31	—	A Holly Dolly Christmas
"Christmas Where We Are" (featuring Billy Ray Cyrus)	2020	—	34	—	A Holly Dolly Christmas
"Pretty Paper" (with Willie Nelson)	2020	—	12	—	A Holly Dolly Christmas
"You Are My Christmas" (with Randy Parton)	2020	—	21	—	A Holly Dolly Christmas
"Purple Rain"	2023	—	—	14	Rockstar
"—" denotes a recording that did not chart or was not released in that territory.

== Music videos ==
Title	Year	Director
"Here You Come Again"	1977	—N/a
"Baby I'm Burnin'"	1978	—N/a
"You're the Only One"	1979	—N/a
"Great Balls of Fire"	1979	—N/a
"Sweet Summer Lovin'"	1979	—N/a
"Help!"	1979	—N/a
"Down"	1979	—N/a
"Star of the Show"	1979	—N/a
"9 to 5"	1980	—N/a
"Potential New Boyfriend"	1983	Steve Barron
"You Are"	1983	—N/a
"Islands in the Stream" (Live) (with Kenny Rogers)	1983	—N/a
"Real Love" (Live) (with Kenny Rogers)	1985	Doug Dowdel
"The River Unbroken"	1987	Brian Grant
"To Know Him Is to Love Him" (with Emmylou Harris and Linda Ronstadt)	1987	White Copeman
"Those Memories of You" (with Emmylou Harris and Linda Ronstadt)	1987	White Copeman
"I Know You by Heart" (with Smokey Robinson)	1988	—N/a
"Why'd You Come in Here Lookin' Like That"	1989	Jack Cole
"He's Alive" (Live)	1989	Walter C. Miller
"Love Is Strange" (with Kenny Rogers)	1990	Gerry Wenner
"Rockin' Years" (with Ricky Van Shelton)	1991	Michael Salomon
"Eagle When She Flies"	1991	Mary Lambert
"Silver and Gold"	1991	Deaton-Flanigen
"Straight Talk"	1992	Dominic Orlando
"Light of a Clear Blue Morning"	1992	Mary Lambert
"Romeo" (with Billy Ray Cyrus, Mary Chapin Carpenter, Pam Tillis, Kathy Mattea and Tanya Tucker)	1993	Randee St. Nicholas
"More Where That Came From"	1993	Randee St. Nicholas
"Silver Threads and Golden Needles" (with Loretta Lynn and Tammy Wynette)	1993	Deaton Flanigen
"The Day I Fall in Love" (with James Ingram)	1994	Jim Yukich
"When You Tell Me That You Love Me" (with Julio Iglesias)	1994	John Hopgood
"Just When I Needed You Most"	1996	John Lloyd Miller
"Peace Train" (Unreleased)	1997	Christopher Ciccone
"Honky Tonk Songs"	1998	Thom Oliphant
"The Salt in My Tears"	1998	Guy Guillet
"After the Gold Rush" (with Emmylou Harris and Linda Ronstadt)	1999	Jim Shea
"Shine"	2001	Brent Hedgecock
"Dagger Through the Heart"	2002	Brent Hedgecock
"Stand by the River" (with Dottie Rambo)	2002	—N/a
"Hello God" (Live)	2002	Paul Miller
"I'm Gone"	2003	Sophie Muller
"Jolene" (with Mindy Smith)	2003	Trey Fanjoy
"Color Me America"	2003	—N/a
"Welcome Home"	2004	Trey Fanjoy
"Creepin' In" (with Norah Jones)	2004	Hamish Hamilton
"The Blues Man" (with George Jones)	2005	Joe Thomas
"Imagine" (with David Foster)	2005	Paula Walker
"When I Get Where I'm Going" (with Brad Paisley)	2005	Jim Shea
"Travelin' Thru"	2006	—N/a
"Heartbreaker's Alibi" (with Rhonda Vincent)	2006	Trey Fanjoy
"Better Get to Livin'"	2007	Steve Lippman
"Jesus & Gravity"	2008	Steve Lippman
"Shinola" (Live)	2008	Fran Strine
"To Daddy" (Tom Astor featuring Dolly Parton)	2008	—N/a
"Backwoods Barbie"	2009	Trey Fanjoy
"Change It" (featuring the Cast of 9 to 5: The Musical)	2009	Mike Hagler; Steve Summers
"Here You Come Again" (Live)	2009	Fran Strine
"Jolene" (Live)	2009	Fran Strine
"I Am Strong" (with The Grascals)	2011	David Corlew
"Together You and I"	2011	Trey Fanjoy
"The Sacrifice"	2011	Arnberger/Eady
"You Can't Make Old Friends" (with Kenny Rogers)	2013	Trey Fanjoy
"Home"	2014	Justine Feldt
"When I Stop Dreaming" (with Don Henley)	2015	Daniel Pearl
"My Father's Daughter" (with Jewel)	2015	Tom Campbell
"Forever Country" (among Artists of Then, Now & Forever)	2016	Joseph Kahn
"Jolene" (with Pentatonix)	2016	—N/a
"The Story"	2017	—N/a
"Here I Am" (with Sia)	2018	Anne Fletcher
"Girl in the Movies"	2018	Robert Hoffman
"Jolene" (New String Version)	2018	—N/a
"God Only Knows" (with For King & Country)	2019	Ben Smallbone
"Faith" (with Galantis featuring Mr. Probz)	2019	Dano Cerny
"There Was Jesus" (with Zach Williams)	2020	—N/a
"When Life Is Good Again"	2020	Steve Summers
"Pink" (with Monica, Jordin Sparks, Rita Wilson, and Sara Evans)	2020	—N/a
"Cuddle Up, Cozy Down Christmas" (with Michael Bublé)	2020	Alex Popkin
"All I Want for Christmas Is You" (with Jimmy Fallon)	2020	Alex Popkin
"Pretty Paper" (with Willie Nelson)	2020	Alex Popkin
"Does He Love You" (with Reba McEntire)	2021	Dano Cerny
"Someday It'll All Make Sense" (with Bill Anderson)	2022	Trey Fanjoy

== See also ==
- List of songs recorded by Dolly Parton
- Porter Wagoner and Dolly Parton discography
