= Porter Wagoner and Dolly Parton discography =

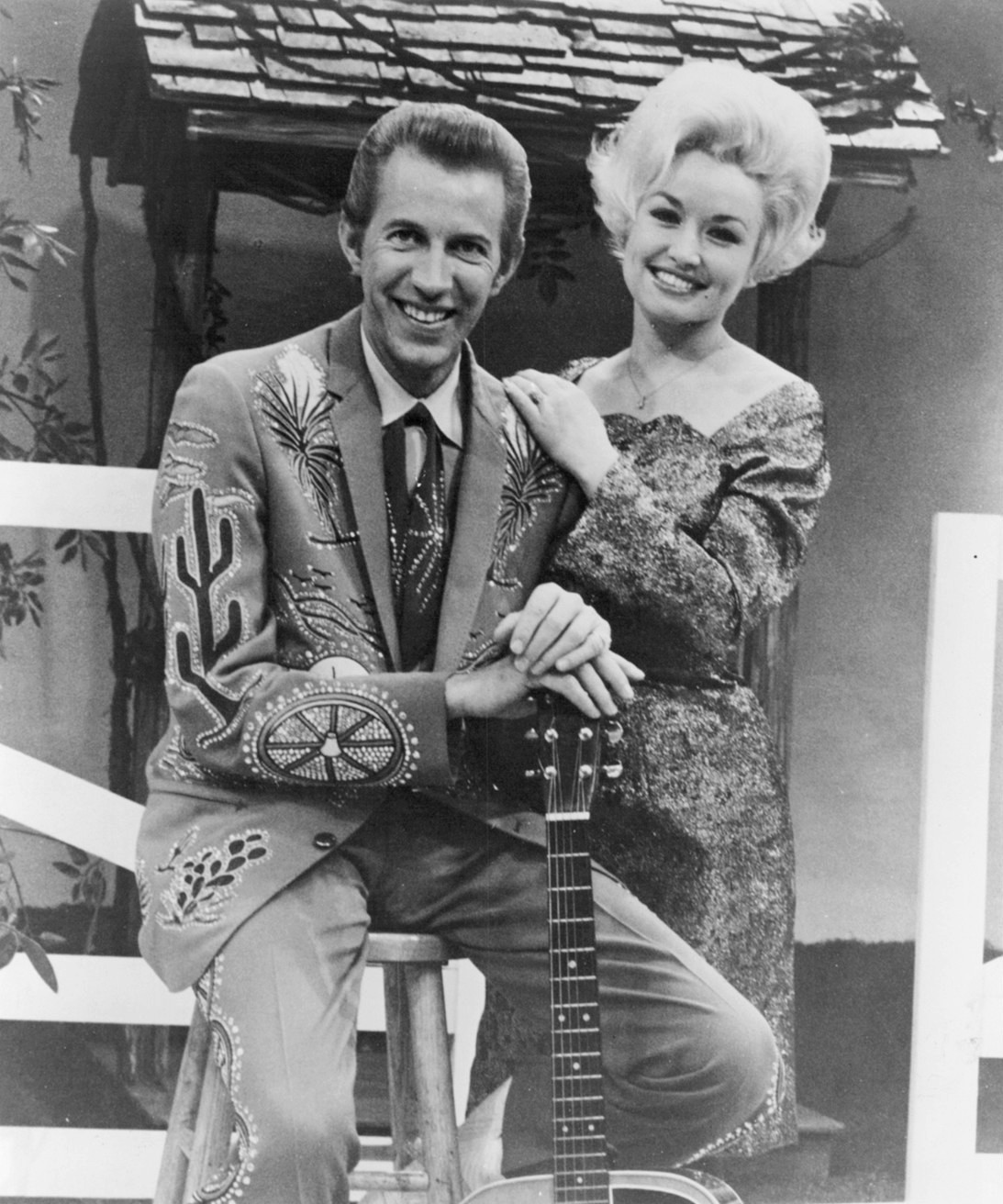
- Wagoner and Parton on the set of The Porter Wagoner Show in 1969
- Studio albums: 13
- Compilation albums: 15
- Singles: 21

While signed to RCA Records as solo artists, American country music duo Porter Wagoner and Dolly Parton released 13 studio albums together between 1968 and 1980. They charted 21 singles on the Billboard Hot Country Singles chart, including the #1 "Please Don't Stop Loving Me".

== Studio albums ==
Title	Details	Peak positions	
Title	Details	US Country	US
Just Between You and Me	Release date: January 15, 1968; Label: RCA Victor	8	—
Just the Two of Us	Release date: September 9, 1968; Label: RCA Victor	5	184
Always, Always	Release date: June 30, 1969; Label: RCA Victor	5	162
Porter Wayne and Dolly Rebecca	Release date: March 9, 1970; Label: RCA Victor	4	137
Once More	Release date: August 3, 1970; Label: RCA Victor	7	191
Two of a Kind	Release date: February 8, 1971; Label: RCA Victor	13	142
The Right Combination • Burning the Midnight Oil	Release date: January 3, 1972; Label: RCA Victor	6	—
Together Always	Release date: September 11, 1972; Label: RCA Victor	3	—
We Found It	Release date: February 12, 1973; Label: RCA Victor	20	—
Love and Music	Release date: July 2, 1973; Label: RCA Victor	8	—
Porter 'n' Dolly	Release date: August 19, 1974; Label: RCA Victor	8	—
Say Forever You'll Be Mine	Release date: August 18, 1975; Label: RCA Victor	6	—
Porter & Dolly	Release date: August 4, 1980; Label: RCA Victor	9	—
"—" denotes releases that did not chart

== Compilation albums ==
Title	Details	Peak positions
Title	Details	US Country
The Best of Porter Wagoner & Dolly Parton	Release date: July 19, 1971; Label: RCA Victor	7
Most Requested	Release date: 1975; Label: RCA Victor	—
The Hits of Porter 'n' Dolly	Release date: 1976; Label: RCA Victor	—
Sweet Harmony	Release date: 1982; Label: Pair, RCA Special Products	—
Lassoes 'n Spurs	Release date: 1992; Label: RCA Victor	—
Porter & Dolly: The Essential Porter Wagoner and Dolly Parton	Release date: June 18, 1996; Label: RCA, BMG	—
20 Greatest Hits	Release date: March 10, 1998; Label: TeeVee	—
All American Country	Release date: 2000; Label: BMG Special Products	—
Duets	Release date: June 2, 2008; Label: RCA, Legacy	—
Playlist: The Very Best of Porter Wagoner & Dolly Parton	Release date: November 27, 2012; Label: Legacy	—
Just Between You and Me: The Complete Recordings, 1967–1976	Release date: May 5, 2014; Label: Bear Family	—
The Right Combination	Release date: 2015; Label: Sony Music/Cracker Barrel	45
RCA Sessions (1968–1976)	Release date: April 5, 2019; Label: Sony Music	—
"—" denotes releases that did not chart

== Singles ==
Single	Year	Peak positions		Album
Single	Year	US Country	CAN Country	Album
"The Last Thing on My Mind"	1967	7	4	Just Between You and Me
"Holding on to Nothin'"	1968	7	17	Just the Two of Us
"We'll Get Ahead Someday"	1968	5	—	Just the Two of Us
"Jeannie's Afraid of the Dark"	1968	51	—	Just the Two of Us
"Yours Love"	1969	9	—	Always, Always
"Always, Always"	1969	16	—	Always, Always
"Just Someone I Used to Know"	1969	5	20	Porter Wayne and Dolly Rebecca
"Tomorrow Is Forever"	1970	9	34	Porter Wayne and Dolly Rebecca
"Daddy Was an Old Time Preacher Man"	1970	7	12	Once More
"Better Move It on Home"	1971	7	8	The Best of Porter Wagoner & Dolly Parton
"The Right Combination"^{[A]}	1971	14	26	The Right Combination • Burning the Midnight Oil
"Burning the Midnight Oil"	1971	11	9	The Right Combination • Burning the Midnight Oil
"Lost Forever in Your Kiss"	1972	9	—	Together Always
"Together Always"	1972	14	—	Together Always
"We Found It"	1973	30	21	We Found It
"If Teardrops Were Pennies"	1973	3	5	Love and Music
"Please Don't Stop Loving Me"	1974	1	45	Porter 'n' Dolly
"Say Forever You'll Be Mine"	1975	5	1	Say Forever You'll Be Mine
"Is Forever Longer than Always"	1976	8	6	Non-album single
"Making Plans"	1980	2	38	Porter & Dolly
"If You Go, I'll Follow You"	1980	12	—	Porter & Dolly
"—" denotes releases that did not chart

=== Promotional singles ===
Single	Year	Album
"Here Comes the Freedom Train"	1973	Non-album single

== See also ==
- Porter Wagoner discography
- Dolly Parton albums discography
- Dolly Parton singles discography

== Notes ==
- A "The Right Combination" also peaked at number 6 on the Billboard Bubbling Under Hot 100 Singles chart.
