= The Cold Hard Facts of Life =

Studio album by Porter Wagoner
- Released: 1967
- Studios: RCA Victor Studios (Nashville, Tennessee)
- Genre: Country
- Label: RCA Victor
- Producer: Bob Ferguson

Porter Wagoner chronology
Soul of a Convict and Other Great Prison Songs (1967)	The Cold Hard Facts of Life (1967)	Just Between You and Me (1968)

The Cold Hard Facts of Life is a studio album by country music singer Porter Wagoner. It was released in 1967 by RCA Victor (catalog no. LSP-3797).

The album debuted on Billboard magazine's Top Country Albums chart on June 10, 1967, peaked at No. 4, and remained on the chart for a total of 28 weeks. The album included the No. 2 hit, "The Cold Hard Facts of Life".

AllMusic gave the album a rating of four stars. Reviewer Dan Cooper called it "good, straight-ahead country" and referred to the cover art as "the hillbilly graphics howler of all time."

== Track listing ==
Side one
No.	Title	Writer(s)	Length
1.	"The First. Mrs. Jones"	Bill Anderson	2:43
2.	"Words and Music"	Vance Bulla	2:32
3.	"The Cold Hard Facts of Life"	Bill Anderson	3:10
4.	"Sleep"	Jack Clement	2:19
5.	"Hundred Dollar Funeral"	Vic McAlpin	2:45
6.	"If I Could Only Start Over"	Faye Bradshaw	1:57

Side two
No.	Title	Writer(s)	Length
1.	"Tragic Romance"	Grandpa Jones	2:29
2.	"Try Being Lonely"	Charles "Buck" Trent and George McCormick	1:43
3.	"I'll Get Ahead Someday"	Mack Magaha	2:00
4.	"I Just Can't Let You Say Goodbye"	Willie Nelson	2:35
5.	"Shopworn"	Ted Harris	2:13
6.	"Julie"	Waylon Jennings	2:34
