= Honky Tonk Angels =

Studio album by Dolly Parton, Loretta Lynn and Tammy Wynette
- Released: November 2, 1993
- Recorded: February 1993
- Studios: Nightingale Studio (Nashville); Masterfonics (Nashville); The Doghouse (Nashville)
- Genre: Country
- Length: 33:00
- Label: Columbia
- Producers: Steve Buckingham; Dolly Parton

Dolly Parton chronology
Slow Dancing with the Moon (1993)	Honky Tonk Angels (1993)	Heartsongs: Live from Home (1994)

Loretta Lynn chronology
Making Believe (1988)	Honky Tonk Angels (1993)	Making More Memories (1994)

Tammy Wynette chronology
Heart Over Mind (1990)	Honky Tonk Angels (1993)	Without Walls (1994)

Singles from Honky Tonk Angels
- 1. "Silver Threads and Golden Needles" Released: November 8, 1993

Honky Tonk Angels is a collaborative studio album by Dolly Parton, Loretta Lynn and Tammy Wynette. It was released on November 2, 1993, by Columbia Records. The album was certified Gold by the RIAA on January 5, 1994, for sales of 500,000 copies.

== Background ==
The album had been a long-rumored project between the country singers for over a decade. It was mostly Parton's idea to bring together the women who made their musical breakthroughs in the '60s. These were also the women who changed the texture of the music by weaving strands of modern life into the traditional country patterns they grew up with and helped enlarge the audience for country music. Once Parton talked the others into doing the project–an easy argument, by all accounts–she asked Steve Buckingham to co-produce with her.

== Content ==
The album features many country standards, including "It Wasn't God Who Made Honky Tonk Angels" (which features a guest vocal appearance by the song's originator and the original country queen, Kitty Wells), "Wings of a Dove" (a 1960 hit for Ferlin Husky), "I Forgot More Than You'll Ever Know" (a 1953 hit for the Davis Sisters), "Put It Off Until Tomorrow" (a 1966 Bill Phillips hit that was Parton's first success as a songwriter), "Lovesick Blues" (a country classic known for Hank Williams' 1949 rendition; here the trio sings along with a vintage recording of the song by Patsy Cline), and "I Dreamed of a Hillbilly Heaven", Tex Ritter's 1962 classic that features new spoken dialogue written by Parton.

The original songs by Loretta Lynn and Tammy Wynette are solo performances by each of them with harmony vocals by Parton and "Sittin' on the Front Porch Swing" is a Parton solo. The album features liner notes written by Ralph Emery.

== Critical reception ==
Professional ratings
Review scores
Source	Rating
AllMusic	3/5 stars
The Encyclopedia of Popular Music	4/5 stars

The review published in the November 27, 1993, issue of Billboard said that the album is "a spirited collaboration that brings together three country music cornerstones and throws in a pinch of Patsy Cline and Kitty Wells for good measure." The review went on to say, "There are a few musically inspired moments here, notably Parton's "Sittin' on the Front Porch Swing" and Wynette's "That's the Way It Could Have Been". But, for the most part, this is more of a nostalgic look back than a celebration of present–day glories."

Kelly McCartney of AllMusic wrote that "for fans of traditional country or great singers, this is a fun listen because it nicely captures three of the best voices around."

== Commercial performance ==
The album peaked at No. 6 on the US Billboard Top Country Albums chart and No. 42 on the US Billboard 200 chart. In Canada, the album peaked at No. 6 on the RPM Country Albums chart and No. 44 on the RPM Albums chart.

The only single, "Silver Threads and Golden Needles", was released in November 1993 and peaked at No. 68 on the US Billboard Hot Country Singles & Tracks chart.

== Accolades ==
The album and its single were nominated for several awards. The album was nominated for Album of the Year at the 1994 TNN Music City News Country Awards and "Silver Threads and Golden Needles" was nominated for Vocal Collaboration of the Year. "Silver Threads and Golden Needles" also received a nomination at the 37th Annual Grammy Awards for Best Country Collaboration with Vocals and Vocal Event of the Year at the 28th Annual Country Music Association Awards.

37th Annual Grammy Awards

Year	Nominee / work	Award	Result
1995	"Silver Threads and Golden Needles"	Best Country Collaboration with Vocals	Nominated

28th Annual Country Music Association Awards

Year	Nominee / work	Award	Result
1994	"Silver Threads and Golden Needles"	Vocal Event of the Year	Nominated

1994 TNN Music City News Country Awards

Year	Nominee / work	Award	Result
1994	Honky Tonk Angels	Album of the Year	Nominated
1994	"Silver Threads and Golden Needles"	Vocal Collaboration of the Year	Nominated

== Track listing ==
No.	Title	Writer(s)	Length
1.	"It Wasn't God Who Made Honky Tonk Angels" (with special guest Kitty Wells)	J.D. Miller	2:51
2.	"Put It Off Until Tomorrow"	Dolly Parton; Bill Owens	2:38
3.	"Silver Threads and Golden Needles"	Jack Rhodes; Dick Reynolds	2:24
4.	"Please Help Me I'm Falling (In Love with You)"	Don Robertson; Hal Blair	2:35
5.	"Sittin' on the Front Porch Swing"	Buddy Sheffield	2:34
6.	"Wings of a Dove"	Bob Ferguson	2:54
7.	"I Forgot More Than You'll Ever Know"	Cecil Null	2:12
8.	"Wouldn't It Be Great"	Loretta Lynn	3:03
9.	"That's the Way It Could Have Been"	Tammy Wynette	2:55
10.	"Let Her Fly"	Parton	3:04
11.	"Lovesick Blues" (with special guest Patsy Cline)	Cliff Friend; Irving Mills	2:18
12.	"I Dreamed of a Hillbilly Heaven"	Hal Southern; Eddie Dean	3:32
Total length:			33:00

== Personnel ==
Adapted from the album liner notes.

- Eddie Bayers – drums
- Harold Bradley – tic-tac ("Lovesick Blues")
- Owen Bradley – producer ("Lovesick Blues")
- Steve Buckingham – producer
- Patsy Cline – guest vocals ("Lovesick Blues")
- Don Cobb – editing
- Floyd Cramer – piano ("Lovesick Blues")
- Jimmy Day – steel ("Lovesick Blues")
- Richard Dennison – backing vocals
- Hank Garland – electric guitar ("Lovesick Blues")
- Steve Gibson – guitar, tic-tac
- Rob Hajacos – fiddle
- Vicki Hampton – background vocals
- Buddy Harman – drums ("Lovesick Blues")
- Roy Huskey Jr. – upright bass
- Bill Johnson – art direction, design
- Beth Kindig – art assistance
- Cari Landers – production assistant
- Jason Lehning – assistant engineer
- Loretta Lynn – lead vocals, harmony vocals
- Grady Martin – electric guitar ("Lovesick Blues")
- Bob Moore – upright bass ("Lovesick Blues")
- Marshall Morgan – engineer
- Farrell Morris – vibes
- Weldon Myrick – steel
- Louis Nunley – backing vocals
- Jennifer O'Brien-Enoch – backing vocals, vocal coordinator
- Gary Paczosa – engineer
- Dolly Parton – lead vocals, harmony vocals, producer
- Denny Purcell – mastering
- Tom Robb – bass
- Hargus "Pig" Robbins – piano
- Billy Sanford – guitar
- Alan Schulman – additional engineering
- Toby Seay – additional engineering
- Ed Simonton – assistant engineer
- Adam Steffy – mandolin
- Bruce Watkins – acoustic guitar
- Cindy Reynolds Watt – harp
- Rollow Welch – art direction, design
- Kitty Wells – guest vocals ("It Wasn't God Who Made Honky Tonk Angels")
- Bruce Wolfe – cover painting
- Tammy Wynette – lead vocals, harmony vocals
- Note: "Lovesick Blues" was recorded by Patsy Cline on January 27, 1960, and produced by Owen Bradley. The musicians for this session are noted above.

== Charts ==
Album

Chart (1993–1994)	Peak position
Australian Albums (ARIA)	177
Canada Country Albums/CDs (RPM)	6
Canada Top Albums/CDs (RPM)	44
UK Country Albums (Official Charts)	10
US Billboard 200	42
US Top Country Albums (Billboard)	6
US Cashbox Country Albums	4

Singles

Title	Year	Peak position
Title	Year	US Country
"Silver Threads and Golden Needles"	1993	68

== Certifications ==
Region	Certification	Certified units/sales
Canada (Music Canada)	Gold	50,000^{^}
United States (RIAA)	Gold	500,000^{^}
^{^} Shipments figures based on certification alone.
