= Porter Wayne and Dolly Rebecca =

Studio album by Porter Wagoner and Dolly Parton
- Released: March 9, 1970
- Recorded: April 21, 1969–December 3, 1969
- Studio: RCA Studio B (Nashville)
- Genre: Country
- Length: 26:03
- Label: RCA Victor
- Producer: Bob Ferguson

Porter Wagoner and Dolly Parton chronology
Always, Always (1969)	Porter Wayne and Dolly Rebecca (1970)	Once More (1970)

Dolly Parton chronology
The Fairest of Them All (1970)	Porter Wayne and Dolly Rebecca (1970)	As Long as I Love (1970)

Singles from Porter Wayne and Dolly Rebecca
- 1. "Just Someone I Used to Know" Released: September 29, 1969; 2. "Tomorrow Is Forever" Released: January 19, 1970

Porter Wayne and Dolly Rebecca is the fourth collaborative studio album by Porter Wagoner and Dolly Parton. It was released on March 9, 1970, by RCA Victor. The album was produced by Bob Ferguson. It peaked at number four on the Billboard Top Country Albums chart and number 137 on the Billboard 200 chart. Two top ten singles were released from the album, "Just Someone I Used to Know" and "Tomorrow Is Forever", peaking at numbers five and nine, respectively. "Just Someone I Used to Know" was nominated for Best Country Performance by a Duo or Group at the 12th Annual Grammy Awards.

== Recording ==
Recording sessions for the album took place at RCA Studio B in Nashville, Tennessee, on December 1, 2 and 3, 1969. Two songs on the album were recorded during sessions for 1969's Always, Always. "Just Someone I Used to Know" and "Mendy Never Sleeps" were recorded on April 21 and 22, 1969, respectively.

== Release and promotion ==
The album was released March 9, 1970, on LP, 8-track, and cassette.

=== Singles ===
The album's first single, "Just Someone I Used to Know", was released in September 1969 and debuted at number 62 on the Billboard Hot Country Songs chart dated October 25. It peaked at number five on the chart dated December 13, its eighth week on the chart. The single charted for a total of 16 weeks. It also peaked at number 20 in Canada on the RPM Country Singles chart. "Tomorrow Is Forever" was released as the second single in January 1970, and debuted at number 75 on the Billboard Hot Country Songs chart dated February 14. It peaked at number nine on the chart dated April 4, its eighth week on the chart. It charted for 15 weeks. It also peaked at number 34 in Canada on the RPM Country Singles chart.

== Critical reception ==
Professional ratings
Review scores
Source	Rating
AllMusic	4.5/5 stars
The Encyclopedia of Popular Music	3/5 stars

In the issue dated March 21, 1970, Billboard published a review which said, "This great country duo does "Tomorrow Is Forever", their current smash single, in addition to "Forty Miles from Poplar Bluff", "Silver Sandals", and others. It is a powerful package, full of true country flavor."

Cashbox published a review in the March 14, 1970 issue, saying, "Porter Wagoner and Dolly Parton join forces once again and perform an album that’s certain to be a smash. The two singers blend their talents on a cluster of good tunes, a number of them the work of Dolly herself (one of these, "Tomorrow Is Forever", is a current single hit for Porter and Dolly). Reserve a spot on the charts for this one."

AllMusic gave the album 4.5 out of 5 stars.

== Commercial performance ==
The album debuted at number 39 on the Billboard Top Country Albums chart dated March 28, 1970. It peaked at number four on the chart dated June 13, its twelfth week on the chart. The album charted for 25 weeks. It also peaked at number 137 on the Billboard 200 chart.

== Accolades ==
The album's first single, "Just Someone I Used to Know", earned a nomination for Best Country Performance by a Duo or Group at the 12th Annual Grammy Awards. It was Wagoner's eighth nomination and Parton's first.

Awards and nominations received for Once More
Award	Year	Category	Nominee/work	Result
Grammy Awards	1970	Best Country Performance by a Duo or Group	"Just Someone I Used to Know"	Nominated

== Reissues ==
The album was included in the 2014 box set Just Between You and Me: The Complete Recordings, 1967–1976, marking the first time it had been reissued since its original release. It was released as a digital download on September 28, 2018. BGO Records reissued the album on CD in 2020 on a two CD set with Just Between You and Me, Always, Always, and Love and Music.

== Track listing ==
Side one
No.	Title	Writer(s)	Recording date	Length
1.	"Forty Miles from Poplar Bluff"	Frank Dycus	December 1, 1969	2:47
2.	"Tomorrow Is Forever"	Dolly Parton	December 2, 1969	2:45
3.	"Just Someone I Used to Know"	Jack Clement	April 21, 1969	2:21
4.	"Each Season Changes You"	Ruth Talley	December 1, 1969	2:30
5.	"We Can't Let This Happen to Us"	Dorothy Jo Hope	December 2, 1969	2:07
6.	"Mendy Never Sleeps"	Parton	April 22, 1969	2:05

Side two
No.	Title	Writer(s)	Recording date	Length
1.	"Silver Sandals"	Parton	December 2, 1969	2:37
2.	"No Love Left"	Bill Owens	December 3, 1969	2:00
3.	"It Might As Well Be Me"	Parton; Hope	December 3, 1969	2:12
4.	"Run That by Me One More Time"	Parton	December 3, 1969	2:18
5.	"I'm Wasting Your Time and You're Wasting Mine"	Parton	December 3, 1969	2:21

== Personnel ==
Adapted from the album liner notes and RCA recording session records.

- Joseph Babcock – background vocals
- Glenn Baxter – trumpet
- Jerry Carrigan – drums
- Anita Carter – background vocals
- Danny Davis – trumpets
- Pete Drake – steel
- Bobby Dyson – bass
- Dolores Edgin – background vocals
- Bob Ferguson – producer, liner notes
- Lloyd Green – steel
- Roy M. Huskey, Jr. – bass
- Les Leverett – cover photograph
- Mack Magaha – fiddle
- George McCormick – rhythm guitar
- Bill McElhiney – trumpets
- Wayne Moss – guitar
- Al Pachucki – recording engineer
- June Evelyn Page – background vocals
- Dolly Parton – lead vocals
- Hargus Robbins – piano
- Dale Sellers – guitar
- Roy Shockley – recording technician
- Jerry Stembridge – electric guitar
- Buck Trent – banjo
- Porter Wagoner – lead vocals
- Hurshel Wiginton – background vocals

== Charts ==
Chart performance for Porter Wayne and Dolly Rebecca
Chart (1970)	Peak position
US Billboard 200	137
US Top Country Albums (Billboard)	4

== Release history ==
Release dates and formats for Porter Wayne and Dolly Rebecca
Region	Date	Format	Title	Label	Ref.
Various	March 9, 1970	LP; 8-track; cassette	Porter Wayne and Dolly Rebecca	RCA Victor	
Various	September 28, 2018	Digital download	Porter Wayne and Dolly Rebecca	Sony; Legacy	
Europe	February 14, 2020	CD	Just Between You and Me / Always, Always / Porter Wayne and Dolly Rebecca / Love and Music	BGO	
