= Bill Owens (songwriter) =

American songwriter (1935–2021)

- Born: September 28, 1935; Sevier County, Tennessee, USA
- Died: April 7, 2021 (aged 85)

William Earl Owens (September 28, 1935 – April 7, 2021) was an American country music songwriter. He was the uncle of Dolly Parton, He is also related to Miley Cyrus. Over the course of his career, he wrote or co-wrote more than 800 songs, including "Put It Off Until Tomorrow," which he co-wrote with Parton. The song won the 1966 BMI Song of the Year award.

== Early life ==
Bill Owens was born on September 28, 1935, in Sevier County, Tennessee, the seventh of eight children of Rev. Jacob "Jake" Robert Owens (1899–1992) and Rena Kansas Valentine Owens (1902–1968). His sisters included Avie Lee (mother of Dolly Parton) and Dorothy Jo Owens Hope, who also collaborated musically with Parton. His father, Jake Owens, was the subject of the song "Daddy Was An Old Time Preacher Man," written by Parton and her aunt Dorothy Jo Hope. The song was a top ten hit for Parton and Porter Wagoner on the Billboard Hot Country Singles chart in 1970.

== Early career ==
Owens began performing in the 1950s under the name "Little Billy Earl with the Spit Curl." He began teaching his niece Dolly to play the guitar at age 8, and by age 10 he arranged for her to appear on a Knoxville, Tennessee, radio show, the Cas Walker Farm and Home Hour. The show later became a television program, further increasing Parton's exposure. He also got her a spot performing on the Grand Ole Opry in Nashville, Tennessee, while she was just 13. Parton was introduced by Johnny Cash and was called back for three encores. While Parton was still in high school, they began writing songs together and landed a songwriting contract while also performing together at clubs in East Tennessee. Parton said, "He saw early on that that I was serious about my singing".

== Songwriting success ==
When Parton finished high school, Owens moved with her to Nashville and he began performing as a guitarist with country music stars Carl and Pearl Butler, among others. Owens and Parton signed songwriting contracts with Combine Music, and while there wrote "Put It Off Until Tomorrow" which became a number 6 hit on the Billboard Country Chart for Bill Phillips in April 1966. While still signed with Combine, Owens and Parton wrote a second hit for Phillips, "The Company You Keep," which peaked at number 8 on the Billboard Country chart later that year. In 1967 they scored another success when Skeeter Davis reached number 11 on the Billboard Country chart with "Fuel to the Flame." All three of these songs would be recorded by Parton for her debut album Hello, I'm Dolly, along with four others written or co-written by Owens. "Put It Off Until Tomorrow" was also a top ten hit for country music duo The Kendalls in 1980, and has been recorded by country artists including Loretta Lynn, the Osborne Brothers, Ricky Skaggs, and Crystal Gayle.

Owens wrote or co-wrote many songs that were recorded by Parton as a solo artist and with duet partner Porter Wagoner. He wrote or co-wrote 5 of the 12 songs for the Porter and Dolly album Just Between You and Me and three songs for Parton's 1968 solo album Just Because I'm A Woman. In addition, he contributed as writer or co-writer on tracks for the Porter and Dolly albums Porter Wayne and Dolly Rebecca (1970), Once More (1970), Two of a Kind (1971), and The Right Combination • Burning the Midnight Oil (1972). He wrote or co-wrote songs for Parton's solo albums In The Good Old Days (When Times Were Bad) (1969), My Blue Ridge Mountain Boy (1969), The Fairest of Them All (1970), As Long as I Love (1970), Touch Your Woman (1972), Bubbling Over (1973), and Eagle When She Flies (1991).

== Later life ==
Owens was a regular performer at the Dollywood theme park's Back Porch Theater. He had a lifelong interest in the restoration of the endangered American chestnut tree native to the Great Smoky Mountains region. Upon his death, Parton said in her eulogy that Owens and his wife Sandy planted 70,000 trees on Dollywood property over his lifetime. The Bill Owens American Chestnut Fund was established by the American Eagle Foundation at Dollywood to continue conservation efforts.

Owens was portrayed by Cameron Jones in the 2016 made-for-television drama Dolly Parton's Christmas of Many Colors: Circle of Love.

== Death ==
Owens died on April 7, 2021, at the age of 85. Dolly Parton paid tribute to her uncle with a eulogy saying "I wouldn't be here if he hadn't been there."
