= Put It Off Until Tomorrow =

1966 song

Single by Bill Phillips

from the album Put It Off Until Tomorrow
- B-side: "Lonely Lonely Boy"
- Released: January 1966
- Genre: Country
- Length: 2:30
- Label: Decca
- Songwriters: Dolly Parton; Bill Owens

"Put It Off Until Tomorrow" is a song written by Dolly Parton and Bill Owens, and first recorded by American country music artist Bill Phillips. It was released in January 1966, and Phillips released an album of the same name later that year. The song became his biggest hit, peaking at number 6 on the Billboard Hot Country Singles chart. Parton provided uncredited harmony vocals on the single. The song has been covered by numerous artists, and became a top ten hit for The Kendalls in 1980.

== Background and recording ==
Dolly Parton and her uncle Bill Owens were signed to Combine Publishing House and to Monument Records in 1965, before Parton had turned 20. "Put It Off Until Tomorrow" was one of the songs they wrote during their frequent trips between Nashville and their home in East Tennessee. They recorded a demo of the song with Owens singing lead and Parton singing the harmony, which they sent to Bill Phillips, a recording artist with Decca Records who had had a few charting singles at that time. Phillips agreed to record the song, and said "Whoever that girl is singing the harmony, I want her on this record." The song received a 1966 Country Music award from BMI.

Although Parton's harmony was uncredited, it generated widespread interest in her singing and songwriting among country radio listeners. Monument Records owner Fred Foster was marketing Parton as a pop act, concerned that her voice was too high for country music. After the success of "Put It Off Until Tomorrow", Foster was convinced that Parton could succeed in country music, and her first country single, "Dumb Blonde", was released the following year, peaking at number 24 on the Billboard country chart.

Parton has recorded the song several times, first on her debut album, Hello, I'm Dolly, released in 1967 on Monument Records. She also recorded a version with Porter Wagoner for their first album as a duo, Just Between You and Me, released in 1968. A duet with Kris Kristofferson was included on the 1982 compilation album The Winning Hand. "Put It Off Until Tomorrow" was also included on Honky Tonk Angels, a 1993 collaborative album with Parton, Loretta Lynn, and Tammy Wynette.

== Charts ==
Chart (1966)	Peak position
US Hot Country Songs (Billboard)	6

== The Kendalls version ==
"Put It Off Until Tomorrow"

Single by The Kendalls

from the album Heart of the Matter
- B-side: "Gone Away"
- Released: 1980
- Genre: Country
- Length: 2:40
- Label: Ovation
- Songwriters: Dolly Parton; Bill Owens
- Producer: Brien Fisher

The Kendalls singles chronology
"I'm Already Blue" (1980)	"Put It Off Until Tomorrow" (1980)	"Heart of the Matter" (1981)

"Put It Off Until Tomorrow" was covered by American country duo, the Kendalls, for the album Heart of the Matter, released in 1979. The song reached number 9 on the Billboard country chart on August 16, 1980, and number 5 on the Canadian RPM Country Tracks chart. The song was later included on the album The Best of the Kendalls, released in 1981 on Ovation records.

=== Charts ===
Chart (1980)	Peak position
US Hot Country Songs (Billboard)	9
Canadian RPM Country Tracks	5

== Other notable covers ==
- Loretta Lynn covered the song for her 1966 album You Ain't Woman Enough, her first number-one country album. "Put It Off Until Tomorrow" was singled out as a standout track by Cashbox magazine.
- Jan Howard included the song on her 1966 album Jan Howard Sings Evil on Your Mind.
- Jean Shepard and Ray Pillow performed the song on the 1966 album, I'll Take the Dog.
- Jimmy Dean and Dottie West recorded the song for their 1970 album Country Boy & Country Girl.
- The Osborne Brothers included the song on their 1970 album Ru-beeeee.
- Skeeter Davis included the song on her 1972 album "Skeeter Sings Dolly".
- Ricky Skaggs recorded the song for his 1979 album Sweet Temptation.
- Crystal Gayle recorded the song with sisters Loretta Lynn and Peggy Sue for the 2019 album You Don't Know Me: Classic Country.
