= Hits Made Famous by Country Queens =

Compilation album by Faye Tucker and Dolly Parton
- Released: April 13, 1963
- Recorded: 1963
- Genre: Country
- Length: 29:11
- Label: Somerset

Dolly Parton chronology
Hits Made Famous by Country Queens (1963)	Hello, I'm Dolly (1967)

Hits Made Famous by Country Queens is a compilation album by Faye Tucker and Dolly Parton. It was released on April 13, 1963, by budget record label Somerset Records. The album features Tucker singing four selections made famous by Patsy Cline, plus one original song. Parton sings three selections made famous by Kitty Wells, along with two traditional ballads and one original song. The album was made available for digital download on May 11, 2018.

== Track listing ==
Side one: Faye Tucker Sings Hits Made Famous by Patsy Cline
No.	Title	Writer(s)	Length
1.	"Crazy"	Willie Nelson	2:39
2.	"I Fall to Pieces"	Hank Cochran; Harlan Howard	2:45
3.	"Bill Bailey, Please Come Home"	Hughie Cannon; Mason Daring; arr. by David Kleiber	2:47
4.	"Walkin' After Midnight"	Don Hecht; Alan Block	2:33
5.	"Since You Went Away"	Don Falls	2:54

Side two: Dolly Parton Sings Hits Made Famous by Kitty Wells
No.	Title	Writer(s)	Length
6.	"It Wasn't God Who Made Honky Tonk Angels"	J.D. Miller	2:26
7.	"Making Believe"	Jimmy Work	2:40
8.	"Letter to Heaven"	Dolly Parton	2:39
9.	"Release Me"	Eddie Miller; Dub Williams; Robert Yount	2:14
10.	"Two Little Orphans"	Traditional; arr. by Kleiber	2:43
11.	"Little Blossom"	Traditional; arr. by Kleiber	2:51
