= Hello, I'm Dolly =

Studio album by Dolly Parton
- Released: September 18, 1967
- Recorded: 1964–1966
- Studios: Fred Foster Sound Studio, Nashville, Tennessee
- Genre: Country
- Length: 28:55
- Label: Monument
- Producer: Fred Foster

Dolly Parton chronology
Hits Made Famous by Country Queens (1963)	Hello, I'm Dolly (1967)	Just Between You and Me (1968)

Singles from Hello, I'm Dolly
- 1. "The Little Things" Released: June 1966; 2. "Dumb Blonde" Released: November 1966; 3. "Something Fishy" Released: May 1967

Hello, I'm Dolly is the debut studio album by American singer-songwriter Dolly Parton. It was released on September 18, 1967, by Monument Records. The album was produced by Fred Foster. It peaked at number 11 on the Billboard Top Country Albums chart. The album spawned two top 40 hits, "Dumb Blonde" and "Something Fishy", which peaked at numbers 24 and 17, respectively.

== Background ==
Parton began performing as a child, singing on local radio and television programs in the East Tennessee area. By ten, she was appearing on The Cas Walker Show on both WIVK Radio and WBIR-TV in Knoxville, Tennessee. Parton made her first professional recording at age 13 when she recorded "Puppy Love" for Goldband Records. Released in April 1959, the single did not chart. After making musical connections while performing on The Cas Walker Show, Parton and her uncle, Bill Owens, managed to get a guest spot on the Grand Ole Opry on July 25, 1959. Jimmy C. Newman agreed to give up one of his regular Saturday night spots to allow Parton to perform. Parton was introduced by Johnny Cash before she performed a cover of George Jones' "You Gotta Be My Baby" and received three encores. Parton and Owens were signed to Tree Publishing on June 26, 1962, and released one single on Circle B Records prior to Parton releasing "It's Sure Gonna Hurt" in August on Mercury Records. When the single failed to chart, Parton was dropped by the label and Tree Publishing. Parton recorded six songs in 1963 for the Somerset Records budget compilation album Hits Made Famous by Country Queens. Three selections were songs made famous by Kitty Wells, and the others were traditional ballads.

After graduating from high school in May 1964, Parton moved to Nashville the next day. Her initial success came as a songwriter, when Fred Foster, owner of Combine Music and Monument Records, signed Parton to a publishing and recording deal. During this early period at Monument, Parton wrote songs recorded by a variety of artists, including Bill Phillips, Skeeter Davis, Hank Williams Jr., and Kitty Wells. Foster originally felt that Parton's voice was not suited for country and tried to market her as a pop singer with the release of her first five singles for the label: "What Do You Think About Lovin'" (1964), "Happy, Happy Birthday Baby" (1965), "Busy Signal" (1966), "Don't Drop Out" (1966), and "The Little Things" (1966). The most successful of these releases was "Happy, Happy Birthday Baby", which managed to peak at number 108 on the Billboard Bubbling Under the Hot 100 chart.

Following the success of Bill Phillips' recording of Parton's composition "Put It Off Until Tomorrow" (featuring uncredited harmony by Parton) in 1966, Foster was finally persuaded to allow Parton to record country material.

== Release and promotion ==
The album's release was likely pushed back several times. In Parton's 1994 autobiography, My Life and Other Unfinished Business, the release date is given as February 1967, but this date is contradicted by an interview Parton gave in June 1967, where she states that the album "should be out by the end of this month." The album's release was announced for September 1967 by Cashbox, and Record World, following Parton's debut as a regular on The Porter Wagoner Show on September 5. It was finally released September 18, 1967, on LP.

=== Singles ===
The album's first single, "The Little Things", was the final of Parton's pop leaning singles for Monument. It was released in June 1966 and failed to chart.

"Dumb Blonde" was released as a single in November 1966 and debuted at number 64 on the Billboard Hot Country Songs chart dated January 21, 1967. It peaked at number 24 on the chart dated March 18, its ninth week on the chart. It charted for a total of 14 weeks.

The album's third single, "Something Fishy", was released in May and debuted at number 61 on the Billboard Hot Country Songs chart dated June 10. It peaked at number 17 on the chart dated August 5, its ninth week on the chart, becoming Parton's first top 20 hit. It charted for 12 weeks.

== Content ==
Three of the album's 12 tracks are solo Parton compositions and seven of them were co-written with her uncle, Bill Owens. The two remaining tracks, "Dumb Blonde" and "I've Lived My Life", were written by Curly Putman and Lola Jean Dillon, respectively.

The album contains Parton's version of three songs she had written that had already been hits for other artists. "Put It Off Until Tomorrow" had been recorded by Bill Phillips (with uncredited harmony vocals by Parton) and released as a single in January 1966. It peaked at number six on the Billboard Hot Country Songs chart. Skeeter Davis recorded "Fuel to the Flame"; released as a single in January 1967, it peaked at number 11 on the Billboard Hot Country Songs chart. Hank Williams Jr. recorded "I'm in No Condition"; released it as a single in April 1967. It peaked at number 60 on the Billboard Hot Country Songs chart.

== Critical reception ==
Professional ratings
Review scores
Source	Rating
AllMusic	4.5/5 stars
The Encyclopedia of Popular Music	2/5 stars

Billboard published a review of the album in the issue dated October 28, 1967, saying, "Dolly Parton has a little girl voice but it's Lolita in style on the honky-tonking, carousing "Dumb Blonde". She also does extremely well on "I Wasted My Tears", "I Don't Want to Throw Rice", "Something Fishy" and "Fuel to the Flame"."

Cashbox published a review which said, "Dolly Parton could have a big winner in her possession with this striking album. Singing at the top of her form throughout the entire set, the lark offers "Dumb Blonde", "Put It Off Until Tomorrow", "Fuel to the Flame", "The Giving and the Taking", and eight others. Give this one a careful listen. It should pull in a healthy amount of chart action."

Eugene Chadbourne of AllMusic gave the album 4.5 out of 5 stars, saying that "at least half the songs are among her classics, while the rest of the material is hardly weak." He said that Parton's personality was in "full force" on the album. He described "Dumb Blonde" and "Something Fishy" as showing the "wisecracking, smart-cookie side of Parton" and "The Company You Keep" and "I've Lived My Life" as "moralizing while providing the listener with plenty of enjoyment."

== Commercial performance ==
The album debuted at number 43 on the Billboard Top Country Albums chart dated November 11, 1967. It peaked at number 11 on January 13, 1968, its tenth week on the chart. The album charted for a total of 14 weeks.

== Reissues ==
The album was reissued by Monument in 1972 as a two LP set with 1970's As Long as I Love under the title The World of Dolly Parton. It was reissued on CD in 1988 as The World of Dolly Parton, Volume One. The album was released as a digital download on December 4, 2015.

== Track listing ==
No.	Title	Writer(s)	Length
1.	"Dumb Blonde"	Curly Putman	2:27
2.	"Your Ole Handy Man"	Parton	2:12
3.	"I Don't Want to Throw Rice"	Parton, Bill Owens	2:25
4.	"Put It Off Until Tomorrow"	Parton, Owens	2:22
5.	"I Wasted My Tears"	Parton, Owens	2:19
6.	"Something Fishy"	Parton	2:07
7.	"Fuel to the Flame"	Parton, Owens	2:39
8.	"The Giving and the Taking"	Parton, Owens	2:25
9.	"I'm In No Condition"	Parton	2:13
10.	"The Company You Keep"	Parton, Owens	2:33
11.	"I Lived My Life"	Lola Jean Dillon	2:28
12.	"The Little Things"	Parton, Owens	2:29

== Personnel ==
Adapted from the album liner notes.

- Fred Foster – producer, liner notes, photography
- Ken Kim – art direction
- Dolly Parton – lead vocals
- Tommy Strong – technical engineer
- Mort Thomasson – recording engineer

== Charts ==
Chart (1967)	Peak position
US Top Country Albums (Billboard)	11
US Cashbox Country Albums	13

== Charting singles ==
Single	Chart	Peak position
Dumb Blonde	U.S. Billboard Hot Country Singles	24
Something Fishy	U.S. Billboard Hot Country Singles	17

== Release history ==
Release dates and formats for Hello, I'm Dolly
Region	Date	Format	Title	Label	Ref.
Various	September 18, 1967	LP	Hello, I'm Dolly	Monument	
Various	1972	2xLP	The World of Dolly Parton	Monument	
United States	1988	CD	The World of Dolly Parton, Volume One	Monument; CBS Special Products	
Various	December 4, 2015	Digital download	Hello, I'm Dolly	Monument; Legacy	
