= A Real Live Dolly =

Live album by Dolly Parton
- Released: June 29, 1970
- Recorded: April 25, 1970
- Venue: Sevier County High School (Sevierville)
- Genre: Country
- Length: 39:51
- Label: RCA Victor
- Producer: Bob Ferguson

Dolly Parton chronology
As Long as I Love (1970)	A Real Live Dolly (1970)	Once More (1970)

A Real Live Dolly is the first live album by American singer-songwriter Dolly Parton. It was released on June 29, 1970, by RCA Victor. The album was produced by Bob Ferguson and was recorded on April 25, 1970, at Sevier County High School in Sevierville, Tennessee. It peaked at number 32 on the Billboard Top Country Albums chart and number 154 on the Billboard 200 chart.

== Background ==
Plans for a live album were first announced in the February 28, 1970 issue of Billboard. The article stated that April 25 would be the second annual Dolly Parton Day in Parton's hometown and that she would give a benefit show at her high school alma mater to establish a scholarship fund and purchase musical instruments for students at the school. They also announced RCA's plans to record the performance for a live album. The article went on to say that two busloads of artists would make the trip from Nashville to Sevierville to take part in the benefit show.

== Recording ==
The album was recorded on April 25, 1970, at Parton's high school alma mater, Sevier County High School in Sevierville, Tennessee. Eight songs performed that day were cut from the album's release: "Just Because I'm a Woman", "In the Good Old Days (When Times Were Bad)", "Daddy Come and Get Me", "He's a Go-Getter, "Just the Way I Am", "Coat of Many Colors", "Chicken Every Sunday", and a reprise of "Tall Man".

== Release and promotion ==
The album was released June 29, 1970 on LP and 8-track.

== Critical reception ==
Professional ratings
Review scores
Source	Rating
AllMusic	4.5/5 stars
The Encyclopedia of Popular Music	3/5 stars

The review published in the July 11, 1970 issue of Billboard said, "This package has a very homey quality. Dolly is recorded live, doing a show in her home town. Special guest is Porter Wagoner, and together they do several of their noted duets. The tunes include "Wabash Cannon Ball", "Two Sides to Every Story" and "How Great Thou Art". This disk is headed for big sales."

Cashbox also published a review in their July 11 issue, which said, "Dolly Parton went back to her home in Sevier County, Tennessee, recently to be feted by the local folk, to establish a Dolly Parton Scholarship Foundation and to record this album at her alma mater, Sevier County High School, whose students will receive the scholarships. Her many devotees will want to own the set, which features Porter Wagoner in four duets with the songstress. Look for big action on this one."

Record World gave a positive review of the album, saying that "Dolly's a dilly with the hometown Sevierville, Tennessee, crowd."

AllMusic rated the album 4.5 out of 5 stars.

== Commercial performance ==
The album debuted at number 34 on the Billboard Top Country Albums chart. It would peak the following week at number 32. The album spent four weeks on the chart. It debuted and peaked at number 154 on the US Billboard Billboard 200 chart, where it remained for two weeks.

== Reissues ==
The album was included as a bonus disc with pre-orders of Parton's career-spanning box set Dolly in October 2009. This version of the album includes four bonus tracks recorded during the April 25, 1970 performance; "Just Because I'm a Woman", "Daddy Come and Get Me" and "He's a Go Getter" and Parton's first live performance of "Coat of Many Colors". This expanded version of the album was made available as a digital download on March 23, 2010.

== Track listing ==
Side one
No.	Title	Writer(s)	Length
1.	"Introduction by Cas Walker / Wabash Cannonball"	A. P. Carter	1:49
2.	"You Gotta Be My Baby"	George Jones	2:07
3.	"Tall Man"	Billy Strange; Juan Esquivel	1:31
4.	"Medley: Dumb Blonde / Something Fishy / Put It Off Until Tomorrow"	Curly Putman; Dolly Parton; Bill Owens	3:57
5.	"My Blue Ridge Mountain Boy"	Parton	3:40
6.	"You All Come (Y'all Come)"	Arlie Duff	2:23
7.	"Bloody Bones (A Story for Kids)" (Spoken Word)	Parton	3:34

Side two
No.	Title	Writer(s)	Length
1.	"Don Howser Makes Presentation" (Spoken Word)		2:33
2.	"Comedy by Speck Rhodes" (Spoken Word)		2:30
3.	"Run That by Me One More Time" (with Porter Wagoner)	Parton	3:13
4.	"Jeannie's Afraid of the Dark" (with Porter Wagoner)	Parton	2:58
5.	"Tomorrow Is Forever" (with Porter Wagoner)	Parton	2:28
6.	"Two Sides to Every Story" (with Porter Wagoner)	Parton; Owens	1:42
7.	"How Great Thou Art"	Stuart K. Hine	4:27

2009 CD reissue and digital download bonus tracks
No.	Title	Writer(s)	Length
15.	"Just Because I'm a Woman"	Parton	3:33
16.	"Daddy Come and Get Me"	Parton	3:19
17.	"He's a Go Getter"	Parton	2:02
18.	"Coat of Many Colors"	Parton	3:20

== Personnel ==
Adapted from the album liner notes and RCA recording session records.

- Joseph Babcock – background vocals
- Terry Blackwell – guitar
- James Buchanant – fiddle
- Jack Drake – guitar
- Pete Drake – pedal steel
- Bobby Dyson – bass
- Dolores Edgin – background vocals
- Bob Ferguson – producer
- D.J. Fontana – drums
- Johnny Gimble – fiddle
- Edward Howard – guitar
- Dave Kirby – guitar
- Les Leverett – cover photo
- Mack Magaha – fiddle
- George McCormick – guitar
- Al Pachucki – recording engineer
- June Evelyn Page – background vocals
- Dolly Parton – lead vocals
- Hargus Robbins – piano
- Dale Sellers – guitar
- Roy Shockley – recording technician
- Buck Trent – electric banjo
- Hugh "Skip" Trotter – liner notes
- Bill Vandevort – recording technician
- Porter Wagoner – duet vocals

== Charts ==
Chart performance for A Real Live Dolly
Chart (1970)	Peak position
US Billboard 200	154
US Top Country Albums (Billboard)	32
US Cashbox Country Albums	9

== Release history ==
Release dates and formats for A Real Live Dolly
Region	Date	Format	Label	Ref.
Various	June 8, 1970	LP; 8-track	RCA Victor	
United States	October 26, 2009	CD	Sony; Legacy	
Various	March 23, 2010	Digital download	Sony; Legacy	
