= As Long as I Love =

Compilation album by Dolly Parton
- Released: June 8, 1970
- Recorded: 1964–1967
- Studio: Fred Foster Sound Studio (Nashville)
- Genre: Country
- Length: 30:05
- Label: Monument
- Producer: Fred Foster

Dolly Parton chronology
Porter Wayne and Dolly Rebecca (1970)	As Long as I Love (1970)	A Real Live Dolly (1970)

As Long as I Love is a compilation album by American singer-songwriter Dolly Parton. It was released on June 8, 1970, by Monument Records. The album is made up of songs Parton had recorded while signed to Monument Records. She left the label in 1967 to sign with RCA Victor after having released only one album. Three of the songs had previously been issued on singles, the remaining nine songs were previously unreleased.

== Release and promotion ==
The album was released June 9, 1970, on LP.

=== Singles ===
While no singles were released to promote the album's June 1970 release, two of its tracks had previously been issued as singles. "Why, Why, Why" was released in October 1967 and "I'm Not Worth the Tears" was released in January 1968. Both releases failed to chart.

== Critical reception ==
Professional ratings
Review scores
Source	Rating
AllMusic	4/5 stars

Billboard published a review in the issue dated June 20, 1970, which said, "Although Dolly Parton is now on another label, this album should draw considerable attention from her legion of fans. And the selections, such as "I Don't Want You Around Me Anymore", "Too Lonely Too Long", and the title song. "Daddy Won't Be Home Anymore" is another first-rate number."

In the June 27 issue, Cashbox published a review of the album saying, "Here are some old Dolly Parton sides that her fans should enjoy. Most of the songs on the set are Dolly's own compositions (some of them are co-cleffings with Bill Owens), and "Why, Why, Why", "I Don't Want You Around Me Anymore", "As Long as I Love", "Too Lonely Too Long", and the other numbers on the set should please many. LP should fare nicely."

Record World published a review of the album, saying, "Dolly's new release on her old label is unique in that all but three tunes are self-penned. If you like the singing of Miss Dolly and the songwriting combo of Owens and Parton, then you'll go for the East Tennessee beauty's new release. Gal shows why she's so firmly established."

Eugene Chadbourne gave the album 4 out of 5 stars in his review for AllMusic. He said that Parton's years at Monument resulted in "terrific straightforward country numbers." He went on to say that while the album is made up of early material, Parton "already has it all together." He closed by saying the album is "superb country and western" and "establishes Parton as a visionary artist in traditional American music."

== Commercial performance ==
The album did not appear on any major music charts.

== Reissues ==
The album was reissued by Monument in 1972 as a two LP set with 1967's Hello, I'm Dolly under the title The World of Dolly Parton. It was reissued on CD in 1988 as The World of Dolly Parton, Volume Two. The album was released as a digital download on November 23, 2018.

== Track listing ==
Side one
No.	Title	Writer(s)	Length
1.	"Why, Why, Why"	Bill Owens; Dolly Parton	2:19
2.	"I Wound Easy"	Owens	2:17
3.	"I Don't Want You Around Me Anymore"	Owens; Parton	2:04
4.	"Hillbilly Willy"	Parton	1:55
5.	"This Boy Has Been Hurt"	Owens; Parton	2:15
6.	"Daddy Won't Come Home Anymore"	Parton	2:52

Side two
No.	Title	Writer(s)	Length
1.	"As Long as I Love"	Parton	2:42
2.	"A Habit I Can't Break"	Owens	3:15
3.	"I'm Not Worth the Tears"	Parton	2:33
4.	"I Don't Trust Me Around You"	Owens	2:54
5.	"I Couldn't Wait Forever"	Owens; Parton	2:23
6.	"Too Lonely Too Long"	Parton	2:21

== Personnel ==
Adapted from the album liner notes.

- Boudleaux Bryant – liner notes
- Fred Foster – producer
- Bill Goodwin – cover photography
- Jack Gunter – liner photography
- Ken Kim – art direction
- Dolly Parton – lead vocals
- Tommy Strong – engineer
- Bill Walker – arrangements, conductor

== Release history ==
Release dates and formats for As Long as I Love
Region	Date	Format	Title	Label	Ref.
Various	June 8, 1970	LP	As Long as I Love	Monument	
Various	1972	2xLP	The World of Dolly Parton	Monument	
United States	1988	CD	The World of Dolly Parton, Volume Two	Monument; CBS Special Products	
Various	November 23, 2018	Digital download	As Long as I Love	Sony; Legacy	
