= Just Because I'm a Woman =

Studio album by Dolly Parton
- Released: April 15, 1968
- Recorded: December 11–20, 1967
- Studio: RCA Studio B (Nashville)
- Genre: Country
- Length: 30:28
- Label: RCA Victor
- Producer: Bob Ferguson

Dolly Parton chronology
Just Between You and Me (1968)	Just Because I'm a Woman (1968)	Just the Two of Us (1968)

Singles from Just Because I'm a Woman
- 1. "Just Because I'm a Woman" Released: May 27, 1968

Just Because I'm a Woman is the second solo studio album by American singer-songwriter Dolly Parton. It was released on April 15, 1968, by RCA Victor. The album was produced by Bob Ferguson. It peaked at number 22 on the Billboard Top Country Albums chart. The album's title track was the only single released and it peaked at number 17 on the Billboard Hot Country Singles chart.

== Background ==
When Parton joined The Porter Wagoner Show in September 1967 she was still signed to Monument Records. In addition to having Parton join his show, Wagoner was instrumental in persuading RCA Victor to sign Parton to a recording contract. Parton's first three sessions for RCA were limited to duets with Wagoner as she could not record for RCA as a solo artist until her contract with Monument expired.

== Recording ==
Recording sessions for the album took place on December 11, 18 and 20, 1967, at RCA Studio B in Nashville, Tennessee.

== Content ==
The title song, in which a woman admonishes her boyfriend for passing judgment on her previous sexual encounters even though he is guilty of the same behavior, was regarded as something of a daring statement to make at the time. It was written by Parton in response to her husband's questioning (and subsequent reaction) if she'd ever been with a man before him. "The Bridge", distinctive because of its subject matter and rather abrupt ending, details the story of a woman who falls in love with a man and becomes pregnant with his child. His abandonment leads the woman back to the bridge where she apparently commits suicide. The last verse states, "My feet are moving slowly, Closer to the edge, Here is where it started, And here is where I'll end it..." before simply ending, midway through the verse.

Parton re-recorded "Just Because I'm a Woman" for the 2003 tribute album Just Because I'm a Woman: Songs of Dolly Parton.

== Release and promotion ==
The album was released April 15, 1968, on LP.

=== Singles ===
The album's only single, "Just Because I'm a Woman", was released in May 1968 and debuted at number 46 on the Billboard Hot Country Songs chart dated June 29. It peaked at number 17 on the chart dated September 14, its twelfth week on the chart. The single charted for a total of 14 weeks. It also peaked at number eight in Canada on the RPM Country Singles chart.

== Critical reception ==
Professional ratings
Review scores
Source	Rating
AllMusic	4.5/5 stars
The Encyclopedia of Popular Music	3/5 stars

Billboard reviewed the album in the issue dated April 27, 1968, saying that "Dolly really makes it with this package. Her performances are packed with sincerity and style. The songs include "You're Gonna Be Sorry", "False Eyelashes", "Try Being Lonely", and some more earthy, realistic tunes."

Cashbox published a review of the album which said, "After one duet smash with Porter Wagoner, and another just beginning to make the climb, Dolly Parton makes her first RCA solo flight with this LP. Soaring to some pretty heady heights with a dozen well-chosen tracks, the lark spreads her wings like a veteran, especially on such tracks as "Try Being Lonely" and "You're Gonna Be Sorry", as well as the title track, and can count on some excellent response."

Mark Deming of AllMusic gave the album 4.5 out of 5 stars, calling it "one of Parton's best early albums and a superb showcase for her gifts as both a singer and songwriter." He noted that although there are only four Parton compositions on the album, they are four of the best songs included. He concluded by saying that "the album still sounds like a winner decades after its initial release."

== Commercial performance ==
The album debuted at number 44 on the Billboard Top Country Albums chart dated May 4, 1968. It peaked at number 22 on the charted dated June 15, its seventh week on the chart. The album charted for a total of nine weeks.

== Reissues ==
The album was reissued on CD in 1995 as 2Gether on 1 with Porter Wagoner and Parton's first collaborative studio album, Just Between You and Me. It was reissued in 2003 with new liner notes and two bonus tracks recorded for Parton's 1970 live album A Real Live Dolly, including her first live performance of "Coat of Many Colors".

== Track listing ==
Side one
No.	Title	Writer(s)	Recording date	Length
1.	"You're Gonna Be Sorry"	Dolly Parton	December 11, 1967	2:16
2.	"I Wish I Felt This Way at Home"	Harlan Howard	December 11, 1967	2:29
3.	"False Eyelashes"	Demetris Tapp; Bob Tubert	December 20, 1967	2:30
4.	"I'll Oilwells Love You"	Parton; Bill Owens	December 20, 1967	2:16
5.	"The Only Way Out (Is to Walk Over Me)"	Neal Merritt	December 11, 1967	2:55
6.	"Little Bit Slow to Catch On"	Curly Putman	December 18, 1967	2:19

Side two
No.	Title	Writer(s)	Recording date	Length
1.	"The Bridge"	Parton	December 20, 1967	2:34
2.	"Love and Learn"	Owens	December 20, 1967	2:33
3.	"I'm Running Out of Love"	Owens	December 18, 1967	2:06
4.	"Just Because I'm a Woman"	Parton	December 18, 1967	3:04
5.	"Baby Sister"	Shirl Milete	December 18, 1967	2:39
6.	"Try Being Lonely"	Charles Trent; George McCormick	December 20, 1967	2:42

2003 CD reissue
No.	Title	Writer(s)	Recording date	Length
13.	"Just Because I'm a Woman" (Live)	Parton	April 25, 1970	3:30
14.	"Coat of Many Colors" (Live)	Parton	April 25, 1970	3:19

== Personnel ==
Adapted from the album's 2003 CD reissue liner notes.

- Dolly Parton – lead vocals
- David Briggs – piano
- Jerry Carrigan – drums
- Anita Carter – background vocals
- Dolores Edgin – background vocals
- Bob Ferguson – producer
- Lloyd Green – steel guitar
- Junior Huskey – bass
- Mack Magaha – fiddle
- George McCormick – rhythm guitar
- Wayne Moss – electric guitar
- Al Pachucki – recording engineer
- Hargus "Pig" Robbins – piano
- Buck Trent – electric banjo
- Porter Wagoner – liner notes
- Chip Young – rhythm guitar

== Charts ==
Chart performance for Just Because I'm a Woman
Chart (1968)	Peak position
US Top Country Albums (Billboard)	22
US Cashbox Country Albums	13

== Release history ==
Release dates and formats for Just Because I'm a Woman
Region	Date	Format	Title	Label	Ref.
United States	April 15, 1968	LP	Just Because I'm a Woman	RCA Victor	
Europe	September 4, 1995	CD	2Gether on 1	RCA	
Various	October 7, 2003	CD; digital download	Just Because I'm a Woman	RCA; BMG Heritage	
