= Bubbling Over (album) =

Studio album by Dolly Parton
- Released: September 10, 1973
- Recorded: January 26, 1971–May 22, 1973
- Studio: RCA Studio A (Nashville)
- Genre: Country
- Length: 24:41
- Label: RCA Victor
- Producer: Bob Ferguson

Dolly Parton chronology
Love and Music (1973)	Bubbling Over (1973)	Mine (1974)

Singles from Bubbling Over
- 1. "Traveling Man" Released: April 30, 1973

Bubbling Over is the twelfth solo studio album by American singer-songwriter Dolly Parton. It was released on September 10, 1973, by RCA Victor. The album cover photo was shot by Nashville photographer Les Leverett near the fountain at the Country Music Hall of Fame.

The album's single, "Traveling Man", is a new version of a song previously included on her 1971 Coat of Many Colors album. "The Beginning" would later be recorded as a duet with Porter Wagoner and included on their 1975 album, Say Forever You'll Be Mine.

Initially, the title track was also earmarked to be a single but these plans were cancelled in order for "Jolene" to be released instead. In an interview with Billboard in 1974, Parton stated that "we were planning on releasing 'Bubbling Over' as the single but after the LP was finished, we had some other sessions scheduled and 'Jolene' came out of these. We simply thought this was the strongest thing for a single."

== Critical reception ==
Professional ratings
Review scores
Source	Rating
AllMusic	3/5 stars
Christgau's Record Guide	B+

Billboard published a review in the issue dated September 22, 1973, which said, "Dolly must write a dozen or so hits a week, and since Porter Wagoner resumed his writing career, he's almost keeping pace. The two of them supply the bulk of the material for this, another in the huge collection of Dolly's album outputs, and it – as the others before it – tops the last one out. It ranges from the happy uptempo to the tearful ballad, and no one fills this range better than Dolly." the review noted "Love with Me", "Pleasant as May", and "Love, You're So Beautiful Tonight" as the best cuts on the album, with a note to record dealers praising Les Leverett's "excellent" cover art.

In the issue dated October 6, 1973, Cashbox published a review that said, "An eagerly awaited album, Dolly Parton's new release will elicit immediate effervescence upon the initial listening, but then again isn’t that what bubbling over is all about! "Traveling Man", Dolly's last chart single is included on the album. An easy listening blend of country music at its finest this new album will prove an inevitable success for the inimitable Miss Parton. Some of the more outstanding tracks are "Bubbling Over", "Sometimes an Old Memory Gets in My Eye", and "Love with Me"."

== Commercial performance ==
The album peaked at No. 14 on the US Billboard Hot Country LPs chart.

The album's only single, "Traveling Man", was released in April 1973 and peaked at No. 20 on the US Billboard Hot Country Singles chart. The single peaked at No. 12 in Canada on the RPM Country Singles chart.

== Track listing ==
All tracks written by Dolly Parton, except where noted.

Side one
No.	Title	Writer(s)	Recording date	Length
1.	"Bubbling Over"		May 22, 1973	2:20
2.	"Traveling Man"		April 9, 1973	2:12
3.	"Alabama Sundown"	Dave Kirby; Danny Morrison	December 14, 1971	2:31
4.	"Afraid to Live and Afraid of Dying"	Porter Wagoner	May 19, 1972	2:04
5.	"Love with Me"		February 1, 1973	2:15

Side two
No.	Title	Writer(s)	Recording date	Length
1.	"My Kind of Man"		December 12, 1972	2:25
2.	"Sometimes an Old Memory Gets in My Eye"	Bill Owens	February 1, 1973	2:20
3.	"Pleasant as May"		January 26, 1971	2:34
4.	"The Beginning"		January 11, 1972	2:35
5.	"Love, You're So Beautiful Tonight"	Wagoner	May 19, 1972	3:09

== Personnel ==
Adapted from the album liner notes.

- Bob Ferguson – producer
- Les Leverett – photography
- Al Pachucki – recording engineer
- Dolly Parton – lead vocals
- Tom Pick – recording engineer
- Mike Shockley – recording technician
- Roy Shockley – recording technician

== Charts ==
Album

Chart (1973)	Peak position
US Hot Country LPs (Billboard)	14
US Cashbox Country Albums	8

Singles

Title	Year	Peak position	
Title	Year	US Country	CAN Country
"Traveling Man"	1973	20	12
