= Heidi Parton =

American country singer

- Born: 1985 (age 40–41); Tennessee, U.S.
- Occupation: Country singer
- Organization: Dollywood
- Father: Randy Parton
- Relatives: Dolly Parton (aunt), Stella Parton (aunt), Rachel Parton George (aunt)

Heidi Lou Parton (born 1985) is an American country music singer. The niece of Dolly Parton, she is widely known for her work at Dollywood, where she has performed since the age of 4. She currently headlines the Kin and Friends show at Dollywood. She has released two albums, This Kind of Love in 2017 and Reflections in 2025.

== Biography ==
She was born in 1985, the daughter of singer Randy Parton. She began performing at Dollywood, which was co-owned by her aunt, country singer Dolly Parton, at the age of four. By 2017, she was performing in the show Harmonies of the Heart, where she went on to take a creative role in as well as a performing role.

She began working on her first album in 2012, subsequently paused. She intended to finish it in early 2017, but her sister's death delayed the album, titled This Kind of Love to later that year. The album's theme is love, and it includes a variety of genres. Her release party was held at Dollywood.

In 2020, she appeared in Dolly Parton's song "You Are My Christmas". By 2023, she was headlining the Dollywood show Harmonies of the Heart, which emphasizes her aunt's music.

In 2024, she began headlining a new show at Dollywood, Heidi Parton's Kin and Friends, held in the Dreamsong Theater. It features a recorded appearance by Dolly Parton, singing duet with Heidi on Heidi's song, "The Gift", which was written about the passing of her father. This show was considered one of the park's highlights. That same year, she appeared on Parton's album Smoky Mountain DNA, serving as the lead singer on the song "A Rose Won't Fix It".

In 2025, she released her second album, Reflection, which she stated was "a much bigger deal.. than the first one was". In this album, she composed some of the songs, unlike her first album.

In 2026, she joined with two cousins to record a version of Dolly's song "True Blue" from 1994. This recording was released in the wake of her death that year. She also paid tribute to her aunt with a cover of Burning.

She is signed to OwePar Entertainment.
