= Sevier County High School =

Public school in Sevierville, Tennessee, US

Location
- 1200 Dolly Parton Parkway; Sevierville, Tennessee; 35.8656°N 83.5283°W

Information
- Type: Public
- School district: Sevier County Schools
- NCES School ID: 470378001557
- Principal: Mitchell Whaley
- Teaching staff: 66.00
- Grades: 9-12
- Enrollment: 925 (2023-2024)
- Student to teacher ratio: 14.02
- Color
- Athletics conference: Tennessee Secondary School Athletic Association (TSSAA)
- Teams: Smoky Bears
- Website: www.schs.sevier.org

Sevier County High School is a public high school in Sevierville, Tennessee. It is part of the Sevier County Schools district. Alumni include country singer Dolly Parton.

== Demographics ==
The ethnic makeup of the school is approximately 76.8% Non-Hispanic White, 19.0% Hispanic or Latino, 1.8% Asian, 1.5% Black or African American, 0.3% Native American, 0.2% Pacific Islander, and 0.5% from two or more races. Approximately 53.0% of the students are male and 47.0% are female.

== Athletics ==
The school's mascot is the Smoky Bear, and its colors are purple and white. The school competes in the Tennessee Secondary School Athletic Association (TSSAA), and offers the following sports:

- Baseball
- Boys' Basketball - state appearance, 2019.
- Girls' Basketball - state championship, 2002, 2026.
- Boys' Bowling
- Girls' Bowling
- Boys' Cross Country
- Girls' Cross Country
- Boys' Golf - state championship, 2015
- Girls' Golf
- Boys' Track and Field - state championships, 2010, 2016
- Girls' Track and Field - state championships, 1983, 1984
- Cheerleading
- Football - state championship, 1999, 2024, runner-up 2025.
- Softball -
- Boys' Tennis - state championship in doubles, 2026.
- Girls' Tennis
- Volleyball
- Boys' Soccer - state championship, 2021.
- Girls' Soccer
