= Dumb Blonde (Dolly Parton song) =

- Side A of the US single

Single by Dolly Parton

from the album Hello, I'm Dolly
- B-side: "The Giving and the Taking"
- Released: November 1966
- Recorded: 1966
- Studio: Fred Foster Sound Studio, Nashville, Tennessee
- Genre: Country
- Length: 2:27
- Label: Monument
- Songwriter: Curly Putman
- Producer: Fred Foster

Dolly Parton singles chronology
"The Little Things" (1966)	"Dumb Blonde" (1966)	"Something Fishy" (1967)

Audio
- "Dumb Blonde" by Dolly Parton on YouTube

"Dumb Blonde" is a song written by Curly Putman and recorded by American singer-songwriter Dolly Parton. It was released as a single in 1966, by Monument Records. It would be included on Parton's 1967 debut album, Hello, I'm Dolly. It was Parton's first song to chart on the Billboard Hot Country Singles chart, peaking at number 24. Parton re-recorded the song with Miranda Lambert in 2018 for the Dumplin' soundtrack album.

== Critical reception ==
In a positive review, Cashbox said, "Pretty Dolly Parton lets the world know that she's nobody's fool in this catchy lid." They said the song has "a cute, stompin’ sound" and "could very well be the biggie that will establish her." Record World called Parton a "not-so-dumb blonde" and said she should "get lots of mileage out of this tune." They concluded by saying that it "sounds like blondes have more fun." Billboard did not review the single, but they did include it in their Spotlight Singles section, predicating that it would chart on the Hot Country Singles chart.

== Commercial performance ==
"Dumb Blonde" debuted at number 64 on the Billboard Hot Country Singles chart, becoming Parton's first song to appear on the chart. It would eventually peak at number 24 and spend 14 weeks on the chart.

== Track listing ==
- 7" single (Monument 45-982)
1. "Dumb Blonde" (Curly Putman) – 2:27
2. "The Giving and the Taking" (Dolly Parton, Bill Owens) – 2:24

== Charts ==
Chart (1966–1967)	Peak position
US Hot Country Singles (Billboard)	24
US Cashbox Country Top 50	10
