= Once More (Porter Wagoner and Dolly Parton album) =

Studio album by Porter Wagoner and Dolly Parton
- Released: August 3, 1970
- Recorded: April 21–May 6, 1970
- Studio: RCA Studio B (Nashville)
- Genre: Country
- Length: 25:11
- Label: RCA Victor
- Producer: Bob Ferguson

Porter Wagoner and Dolly Parton chronology
Porter Wayne and Dolly Rebecca (1970)	Once More (1970)	Two of a Kind (1971)

Dolly Parton chronology
A Real Live Dolly (1970)	Once More (1970)	The Best of Dolly Parton (1970)

Singles from Once More
- 1. "Daddy Was an Old Time Preacher Man" Released: June 29, 1970

Once More is the fifth collaborative studio album by Porter Wagoner and Dolly Parton. It was released on August 3, 1970, by RCA Victor. The album was produced by Bob Ferguson. It peaked at number 7 on the Billboard Top Country Albums chart and number 191 on the Billboard 200 chart. The album's single, "Daddy Was an Old Time Preacher Man", peaked at number 7 on the Billboard Hot Country Songs chart and was nominated for Best Country Performance by a Duo or Group at the 13th Annual Grammy Awards.

== Recording ==
Recording sessions for the album began at RCA Studio B in Nashville, Tennessee, on April 21, 1970. Two additional sessions followed on May 5 and 6.

== Content ==
The album includes "Daddy Was an Old Time Preacher Man," written by Parton and her aunt, Dorothy Jo Hope, about Rev. Jake Owens, Parton's maternal grandfather, a Pentecostal minister, in addition to the comical "Fight and Scratch".

== Release and promotion ==
The album was released August 3, 1970, on LP and 8-track.

=== Singles ===
The album's only single, "Daddy Was an Old Time Preacher Man", was released in June 1970 and peaked at number 7 on the Billboard Hot Country Songs chart and number 12 in Canada on the RPM Country Singles chart.

== Critical reception ==
Professional ratings
Review scores
Source	Rating
AllMusic	2.5/5 stars
The Encyclopedia of Popular Music	3/5 stars

The review published by Billboard in the August 15, 1970 issue said, "That lilting voice of Dolly Parton's blends perfectly with the lusty sound of Porter Wagoner – as they prove in definitive measure on the hit "Daddy Was an Old Time Preacher Man" – the key sales impetus on this LP. Some outstanding cuts include the tear-jerker "Ragged Angel", the bright and tart "Fight and Scratch", and "Thoughtfulness". Another winning LP from this duo."

Cashbox published a review in the August 8, 1970 issue, which said, "Here's the new album release by one of country music's most famous duos, Porter Wagoner and Dolly Parton and it's a powerhouse item all the way. Decker features such tracks as "Daddy Was an Old Time Preacher Man", "I Know You're Married But I Love You Still", "Before Our Weakness Gets Too Strong", "A Good Understanding", and "Let's Live for Tonight". They all get great vocal stylings from the famed duo. Sure to be a biggie in no time."

AllMusic gave the album 2.5 out of 5 stars.

== Commercial performance ==
The album peaked at number seven on the Billboard Top Country Albums chart and number 191 on the Billboard Billboard 200 chart.

== Accolades ==
The album's single, "Daddy Was an Old Time Preacher Man", received a nomination for Best Country Performance by a Duo or Group at the 13th Annual Grammy Awards. The single also received the Country Award at the 1971 BMI Awards and a Songwriter Achievement Award from the Nashville Songwriters Association International.

Awards and nominations received for Once More
Award	Year	Category	Nominee/work	Result
Grammy Awards	1971	Best Country Performance by a Duo or Group	"Daddy Was an Old Time Preacher Man"	Nominated
BMI Awards	1971	Country Award	"Daddy Was an Old Time Preacher Man"	Won
Nashville Songwriters Association International	1971	Songwriter Achievement Award	"Daddy Was an Old Time Preacher Man"	Won

== Reissues ==
The album was included in the 2014 box set Just Between You and Me: The Complete Recordings, 1967–1976, marking the first time it had been reissued since its original release. It was made available as a digital download on September 28, 2018. The album was reissued by BGO Records in 2019 on a two CD set with Two of a Kind, Together Always, and The Right Combination • Burning the Midnight Oil.

== Track listing ==
Side one
No.	Title	Writer(s)	Recording date	Length
1.	"Daddy Was an Old Time Preacher Man"	Dolly Parton; Dorothy Jo Hope	April 21, 1970	2:57
2.	"I Know You're Married But I Love You Still"	Don Reno; Mack Magaha	April 21, 1970	2:22
3.	"Thoughtfulness"	Bill Owens	May 6, 1970	2:50
4.	"Fight and Scratch"	Parton	April 21, 1970	2:31
5.	"Before Our Weakness Gets Too Strong"	Louis Owens	May 5, 1970	2:37

Side two
No.	Title	Writer(s)	Recording date	Length
1.	"Once More"	Dusty Owens	May 5, 1970	2:30
2.	"One Day at a Time"	Joe Babcock	May 6, 1970	2:28
3.	"Ragged Angel"	Parton	May 5, 1970	2:06
4.	"A Good Understanding"	Parton	April 21, 1970	2:42
5.	"Let's Live for Tonight"	Reno	May 5, 1970	2:08

== Personnel ==
Adapted from the album liner notes and RCA recording session records.

- Joseph Babcock – background vocals
- Jerry Carrigan – drums
- Pete Drake – pedal steel
- Bobby Dyson – bass
- Dolores Edgin – background vocals
- Bob Ferguson – producer
- Johnny Gimble – fiddle
- Dave Kirby – guitar
- Les Leverett – cover photo
- Mack Magaha – fiddle
- George McCormick – rhythm guitar
- Louis Owens – liner notes
- Hargus Robbins – piano
- June Evelyn Page – background vocals
- Dolly Parton – lead vocals
- Al Pachucki – recording engineer
- Dale Sellers – guitar
- Roy Shockley – recording technician
- Jerry Stembridge – guitar
- Buck Trent – banjo
- Porter Wagoner – lead vocals
- Hurshel Wiginton – background vocals

== Charts ==
Chart performance for Once More
Chart (1970)	Peak position
US Billboard 200	191
US Top Country Albums (Billboard)	7

== Release history ==
Release dates and formats for Once More
Region	Date	Format	Title	Label	Ref.
Various	June 8, 1970	LP; 8-track	Once More	RCA Victor	
Various	September 28, 2018	Digital download	Once More	Sony; Legacy	
Europe	August 9, 2019	CD	Once More / Two of a Kind / Together Always / The Right Combination • Burning the Midnight Oil	BGO	
