= Just Between You and Me (Porter Wagoner and Dolly Parton album) =

Studio album by Porter Wagoner and Dolly Parton
- Released: January 15, 1968
- Recorded: October 10–12, 1967
- Studio: RCA Studio B (Nashville)
- Genre: Country
- Length: 29:49
- Label: RCA Victor
- Producer: Bob Ferguson

Porter Wagoner and Dolly Parton chronology
Just Between You and Me (1968)	Just the Two of Us (1968)

Dolly Parton chronology
Hello, I'm Dolly (1967)	Just Between You and Me (1968)	Just Because I'm a Woman (1968)

Singles from Just Between You and Me
- 1. "The Last Thing on My Mind" Released: October 30, 1967

Just Between You and Me is the first collaborative studio album by Porter Wagoner and Dolly Parton. It was released on January 15, 1968, by RCA Victor. The album was produced by Bob Ferguson. It peaked at number eight on the Billboard Top Country Albums chart and spawned one single, "The Last Thing on My Mind", which peaked at number seven on the Billboard Hot Country Songs chart.

== Background ==
When Norma Jean announced that she was leaving The Porter Wagoner Show in August 1967, Wagoner asked Parton to replace her as the "girl singer" on his television series and road show. Parton made her first TV appearance on September 5 and the duo made their first concert appearance on September 14, in Lebanon, Virginia. The crowd greeted Parton with boos and chants for Norma Jean, which led Wagoner to begin singing duets with Parton on the show. Monument Records released Parton's debut album on September 18. In addition to having her join his show as a regular, Wagoner was instrumental in persuading RCA Victor to sign Parton to a recording contract. The duo had their first recording session on October 10 at RCA Studio B in Nashville. Parton's first three sessions for RCA were limited to duets with Wagoner as she could not record for RCA as a solo artist until her contract with Monument expired. Wagoner and Parton made their first Grand Ole Opry appearance together on November 25.

== Recording ==
Recording sessions for the album took place at RCA Studio B in Nashville, Tennessee, on October 10, 11 and 12, 1967.

== Release and promotion ==
The album was released January 15, 1968, on LP.

=== Singles ===
The album's only single, "The Last Thing on My Mind", was released in October 1967 and debuted at number 70 on the Billboard Hot Country Songs chart dated December 2. It peaked at number seven on the chart dated February 10, 1968, its eleventh week. It charted for 17 weeks. The single also peaked at number four on the RPM Country Singles chart in Canada.

== Critical reception ==
Professional ratings
Review scores
Source	Rating
AllMusic	3/5 stars
The Encyclopedia of Popular Music	3/5 stars

Billboard gave a positive review of the album, calling it "enjoyable." The review praised the duo's singing as "exceptional" and the arrangements as "groovy." AllMusic gave the album 3 out of 5 stars.

== Commercial performance ==
The album debuted at number 32 on the Billboard Top Country Albums chart dated February 3, 1968. It peaked at number eight on the chart dated March 9, its sixth week on the chart. The album charted for a total of 27 weeks.

== Reissues ==
The album was reissued on CD in 1995 as 2Gether on 1 with Parton's album Just Because I'm a Woman. It was released as a digital download on March 3, 2017. The album was included in the 2014 box set Just Between You and Me: The Complete Recordings, 1967–1976. BGO Records reissued the album on CD in 2020 on a two-CD set with Always, Always, Porter Wayne and Dolly Rebecca, and Love and Music.

== Track listing ==
Side one
No.	Title	Writer(s)	Recording date	Length
1.	"Because One of Us Was Wrong"	Dolly Parton; Bill Owens	October 12, 1967	2:04
2.	"The Last Thing on My Mind"	Tom Paxton	October 11, 1967	2:34
3.	"Love Is Worth Living"	Parton	October 11, 1967	2:32
4.	"Just Between You and Me"	Jack Clement	October 10, 1967	2:18
5.	"Mommie, Ain't That Daddy?"	Parton	October 10, 1967	3:11
6.	"Four O Thirty Three"	Owens; Earl Montgomery	October 11, 1967	2:45

Side two
No.	Title	Writer(s)	Recording date	Length
1.	"Sorrow's Tearing Down the House (That Happiness Once Built)"	Mel Tillis; Kent Westberry	October 11, 1967	2:23
2.	"This Time Has Gotta Be Our Last Time"	Owens	October 12, 1967	2:26
3.	"Before I Met You"	Charles L. Seitz; Joe Lewis; Elmer Rader	October 10, 1967	1:52
4.	"Home Is Where the Hurt Is"	Fred MacRae; Marge Barton	October 12, 1967	2:10
5.	"Two Sides to Every Story"	Parton; Owens	October 10, 1967	2:17
6.	"Put It Off Until Tomorrow"	Parton; Owens	October 12, 1967	2:27

== Personnel ==
Adapted from the album liner notes and RCA recording session records.

- Jerry Carrigan – drums
- Anita Carter – background vocals
- Pete Drake – pedal steel
- Dolores Edgin – background vocals
- Bob Ferguson – producer
- Roy M. Huskey, Jr. – bass
- Mack Magaha – fiddle
- Jim Malloy – recording engineer
- George McCormick – rhythm guitar
- Wayne Moss – electric guitar
- Dolly Parton – lead vocals
- Hargus Robbins – piano
- Buck Trent – banjo
- Bill Turner – liner notes
- Porter Wagoner – lead vocals

== Charts ==
Chart (1968)	Peak position
US Top Country Albums (Billboard)	8

== Release history ==
Release dates and formats for Just Between You and Me
Region	Date	Format	Title	Label	Ref.
United States	January 15, 1968	LP	Just Between You and Me	RCA Victor	
Europe	September 4, 1995	CD	2Gether on 1	RCA	
Various	March 3, 2017	Digital download	Just Between You and Me	Sony; Legacy	
Europe	February 14, 2020	CD	Just Between You and Me / Always, Always / Porter Wayne and Dolly Rebecca / Love and Music	BGO	
