= Something Fishy (song) =

- Side A of the US single

Single by Dolly Parton

from the album Hello, I'm Dolly
- B-side: "I've Lived My Life"
- Released: 1967
- Recorded: 1966
- Studio: Fred Foster Sound Studio, Nashville, Tennessee
- Genre: Country
- Label: Monument
- Songwriter: Dolly Parton
- Producer: Fred Foster

Dolly Parton singles chronology
"Dumb Blonde" (1966)	"Something Fishy" (1967)	"Why, Why, Why" (1967)

"Something Fishy" is a song written and recorded by American singer-songwriter Dolly Parton. It was released as a single in May 1967, by Monument Records. It would be included on Parton's 1967 debut album, Hello, I'm Dolly. The song peaked at number 17 on the Billboard Hot Country Singles chart, becoming Parton's first top 20 hit.

== Critical reception ==
Billboard gave a positive review of the song, calling it "clever material...performed to perfection." They predicted that it would "fast top her "Dumb Blonde" hit and establish her as one of the label's consistent top sellers." In another positive review, Cashbox said it "could be another chart item for Parton." They described "Something Fishy as "a bright, bouncy side" with a cute treatment from Dolly," while calling "I’ve Lived My Life" a "feelingful tale of woe."

== Commercial performance ==
"Something Fishy" debuted at number 61 on the Billboard Hot Country Singles chart. It would eventually peak at number 17 and spend 12 weeks on the chart.

== Track listing ==
- 7" single (Monument 45-1007)
1. "Something Fishy" (Dolly Parton) – 2:06
2. "I've Lived My Life" (Lola Jean Dillon) – 2:35

== Charts ==
Chart (1967)	Peak position
Singapore (RIAS)	5
US Hot Country Singles (Billboard)	17
