= Love and Music =

Studio album by Porter Wagoner & Dolly Parton
- Released: July 2, 1973
- Recorded: 1973
- Studio: RCA Studio B (Nashville)
- Genre: Country
- Length: 24:53
- Label: RCA Victor
- Producer: Bob Ferguson

Porter Wagoner & Dolly Parton chronology
We Found It (1973)	Love and Music (1973)	Porter 'n' Dolly (1974)

Dolly Parton chronology
My Tennessee Mountain Home (1973)	Love and Music (1973)	Bubbling Over (1973)

Singles from Love and Music
- 1. "If Teardrops Were Pennies" Released: June 4, 1973

Love and Music is the tenth collaborative studio album by Porter Wagoner and Dolly Parton. It was released on July 2, 1973, by RCA Victor. It contains their top ten country single "If Teardrops Were Pennies". The album reached #8 on the U.S. country albums chart. The liner notes are written by Carl Butler and Pearl, writers of the song "If Teardrops Were Pennies", originally a hit in 1951 for Carl Smith.

== Critical reception ==
Professional ratings
Review scores
Source	Rating
The Encyclopedia of Popular Music	3/5 stars

In a positive review of the album, Billboard said, "A collection of love ballads with some of the finest cuts this consistent pair have ever come up with. Aside from the single and one other cut, Dolly and/or Porter wrote every song, and they must have been in romantic moods. Good old fashioned love music, with some timeless lyrics, and it's one everyone will want. There is even a dialog recitation." They went on to say that eight of the ten tunes...have the potential to be around for a long time." They concluded with a note to record dealers, saying that the "good cover work by Les Leverett sets the mood for the album."

In another positive review, Cashbox said, "Aptly titled, this LP contains a soothing, sincere selection of tunes that touch lightly on love—hearts and flowers abound. And there's nothing wrong with that, as anyone familiar with the phenomenal success accorded Dolly and Porter for their rendering of such sentiments should know! This is the sort of album you put on the phonograph and relax to, love to, and let the troubled world fade away. Dolly penned several delightful tunes. Catch "I Get Lonesome by Myself"."

== Recording ==
Recording sessions for the album began at RCA Studio B in Nashville, Tennessee, on February 12 and 13, 1973. These two sessions yielded 7 of the album's ten tracks. Two more of the album's tracks were recorded during an April 9 session. "In the Presence of You" was recorded during a November 29, 1972 session for 1973's We Found It.

== Track listing ==
Track listing, writing credits and track length adapted from LP sleeve.

Side one
No.	Title	Writer(s)	Recording date	Length
1.	"If Teardrops Were Pennies"	Carl Butler	February 13, 1973	2:06
2.	"Sounds of Night"	Porter Wagoner	April 9, 1973	2:23
3.	"Laugh the Years Away"	Howard Tuck	February 12, 1973	1:59
4.	"You"	Dolly Parton	February 13, 1973	2:20
5.	"Wasting Love"	Wagoner	April 9, 1973	1:47

Side two
No.	Title	Writer(s)	Recording date	Length
1.	"Come to Me"	Parton	February 13, 1973	2:21
2.	"Love Is Out Tonight"	Wagoner; Tom Pick	February 13, 1973	2:39
3.	"In the Presence of You"	Wagoner	November 29, 1972	2:47
4.	"I Get Lonesome by Myself"	Parton	February 13, 1973	3:19
5.	"There'll Always Be Music"	Parton	February 13, 1973	3:12
