= Bill Phillips (singer) =

American country music singer-songwriter (1936–2010)

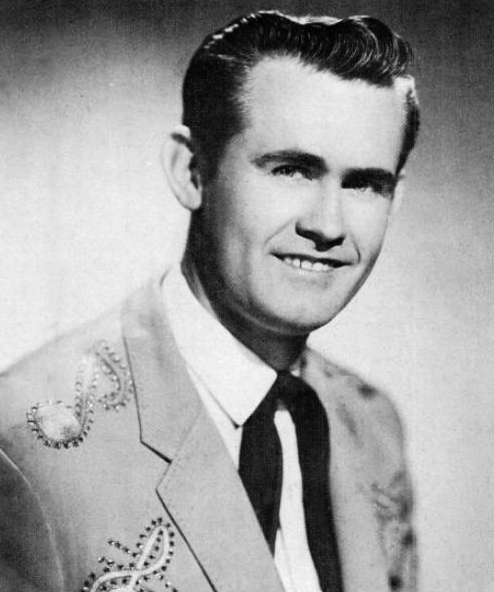
- Phillips in 1967

Background information
- Born: January 28, 1936
- Origin: Canton, North Carolina
- Died: August 23, 2010 (aged 74)
- Genres: Country
- Occupation: Singer
- Instrument: Guitar
- Years active: 1958–1987
- Label: Decca

Bill Phillips (January 28, 1936 – August 23, 2010) was an American country music singer.

He was born in Canton, North Carolina, and his professional music career started with the Old Southern Jamboree on WMIL in Miami in 1955. He moved to Nashville in 1957 and worked with Johnnie Wright and Kitty Wells until the late 1970s. His biggest recording was "Put It Off Until Tomorrow" which peaked on the country charts at No. 6 on April 2, 1966. The Decca recording featured uncredited harmony vocals by the song's composer, a very young and then little known Dolly Parton. In 1984 he began singing duets with Roseanna Rogers, alongside her solo career. The duo scored a top 40 with Angel In My Arms.

== Discography ==
=== Albums ===
Year	Album	US Country	Label
1966	Put It Off Until Tomorrow	11	Decca
1967	Bill Phillips Style	43	Decca
1968	Country Action	—	Decca
1970	Little Boy Sad	—	Decca
1980	When Can We Do This Again	—	Soundwaves

=== Singles ===
Year	Single	US Country	Album
1958	"Lying Lips"	—	singles only
1959	"Foolish Me"	—	singles only
1959	"Sawmill" (w/ Mel Tillis)	27	singles only
1960	"Georgia Town Blues" (w/ Mel Tillis)	24	singles only
1960	"All Night Long"	—	singles only
1960	"How Could You"	—	singles only
1961	"Walk with Me Baby"	—	singles only
1961	"Love Never Dies"	—	singles only
1962	"Yankee Trader"	—	singles only
1963	"Lying to Be Together"	—	Put It Off Until Tomorrow
1964	"I Can Stand It (As Long as She Can)"	22	Put It Off Until Tomorrow
1964	"Stop Me"	26	Put It Off Until Tomorrow
1965	"I Guess You Made a Fool Out of Me"	—	Put It Off Until Tomorrow
1965	"Wanted"	—	single only
1965	"It Happens Everywhere"	—	Put It Off Until Tomorrow
1966	"Put It Off Until Tomorrow"	6	Put It Off Until Tomorrow
1966	"The Company You Keep"	8	Bill Phillips Style
1967	"The Words I'm Gonna Have to Eat"	10	Bill Phillips Style
1967	"I Learn Something New Everyday"	39	Country Action
1967	"Love's Dead End"	25	Country Action
1968	"I Talked About You Too"	—	Country Action
1968	"I'm Thankful"	—	Little Boy Sad
1969	"I Only Regret"	54	Little Boy Sad
1969	"Little Boy Sad"^{A}	10	Little Boy Sad
1970	"She's Hungry Again"	43	singles only
1970	"Same Old Story, Same Old Lie"	46	singles only
1971	"Big Rock Candy Mountain"	56	Little Boy Sad
1972	"I Am, I Said"	66	singles only
1972	"(I Know) We'll Make It"	—	singles only
1973	"Nothing's Too Good for My Woman"	—	singles only
1973	"It's Only Over Now and Then"	91	singles only
1973	"Teach Your Children"	—	singles only
1974	"I've Loved You All Over the World"	—	singles only
1975	"Four Roses"	—	singles only
1978	"Divorce Suit (You Were Named Co-Respondent)"	90	When Can We Do This Again
1978	"I Love My Neighbor"	—	single only
1979	"You're Gonna Make a Cheater Out of Me"	89	When Can We Do This Again
1979	"At the Moonlite"	85	When Can We Do This Again
1979	"Memory Bound"	—	When Can We Do This Again
1981	"Dance the Night Away"	—	singles only
1987	"One by One" "Another Chance" "Deeper Water" "Angel In My Arms" all Duets with Roseanna Rogers	—	singles only

- ^{A}"Little Boy Sad" peaked at No. 17 on the RPM Country Tracks chart in Canada.
