= An Evening with Dolly Parton =

2006–07 concert tour by Dolly Parton

- Tour by Dolly Parton
- Dolly performing in London at Wembley Arena.
- Start date: November 16, 2006
- End date: May 20, 2007
- Legs: 2
- No. of shows: 13 in North America; 19 in Europe; 32 Total

Dolly Parton concert chronology
- The Vintage Tour (2005); An Evening with Dolly Parton (2006-07); Backwoods Barbie Tour (2008)

An Evening with Dolly Parton started in North America in 2006, and continued in Europe in 2007, and was finished in North America the same year.

== History ==
After taking nearly all of 2006 off from touring to focus on other projects, Parton returned with a new stage show in November for a few select concerts as she prepared for a 2007 European tour. The 17 initial dates for the tour "across the pond" were announced to the public for the first time in October 2006. She performed four more shows on the West Coast in early 2007 to hone the show for its European premiere. After the European leg, Parton performed for three nights at a Niagara Falls Casino and at a benefit concert to raise money for a new hospital in her hometown.

Although Parton had said after returning from Europe that a three-month U.S. tour would be coming with the release of her next CD Backwoods Barbie, those plans were pushed back to 2008.

== The show ==
The shows were similar in vein to Parton's previous tours, her 2004 Hello I'm Dolly Tour and 2005's The Vintage Tour. Sets were similar except for the fact that Parton entered via hydraulic lift.

When the show premiered in Europe, an intermission was added so that it became a two-act show, appropriately titled "An Evening With Dolly Parton."

Fans speculated that tracks from Parton's upcoming album Backwoods Barbie would be showcased but that was not the case. Instead "I Dreamed About Elvis", last used on the Hello I'm Dolly Tour was included and in Europe, tracks from her most recent studio album Those Were the Days were spotlighted.

== Set list ==
North America

The following set list is representative of the November 16, 2006 show in Uncasville, Connecticut . It is not representative of all concerts for the duration of the tour.

1. "Baby I'm Burnin'"
2. "Two Doors Down"
3. "Jolene"
4. "Puppy Love"
5. "The Grass Is Blue"
6. "Shine"
7. "Thank God I'm A Country Girl"
8. "God's Coloring Book"
9. "Little Sparrow"
10. "My Tennessee Mountain Home'
11. "Coat of Many Colors"
12. "Marry Me" / "Applejack"
13. "Love Is Strange"
14. "Islands In The Stream"
15. "Here You Come Again"
16. "Crimson and Clover"
17. "Me and Bobby McGee"
18. "9 to 5"
19. "I Dreamed About Elvis"
20. "I Will Always Love You"

Encore

21. "Travelin' Thru"

Europe

The following set list is representative of the March 6, 2007 show in Horsens, Denmark . It is not representative of all concerts for the duration of the tour.

1. "Baby I'm Burnin'"
2. "Two Doors Down"
3. "Jolene"
4. "Puppy Love"
5. "The Grass Is Blue"
6. "Shine"
7. "Thank God I'm a Country Girl"
8. "Little Sparrow"
9. "My Tennessee Mountain Home"
10. "These Old Bones"
11. "Coat of Many Colors"
12. "Smoky Mountain Memories"
13. "Train, Train"
14. "Imagine"
15. "Travelin' Prayer"
16. "Marry Me" / "Applejack"
17. "God's Coloring Book"
18. "Me and Bobby McGee"
19. "Crimson and Clover"
20. "I Dreamed About Elvis "
21. "Islands In the Stream"
22. "Here You Come Again"
23. "9 to 5"
24. "I Will Always Love You"

Encore

25. "He's Alive"

Notes:

- In Karlstad, "I Will Always Love You" and "Imagine" switched places.
- "Puppy Love" was dropped from the set list after the performance in Stockholm.
- "Imagine" was dropped after the Sheffield show.
- "Travelin' Prayer" was dropped after the Zwolle show.
- After the Gothenborg show, "Crimson and Clover" was replaced with "Those Were the Days".
- "Turn! Turn! Turn! (To Everything There is a Season)" was performed from March 13 to 20, 2007.
- "We Irish" was performed during shows in Dublin and Belfast.

== Tour dates ==
Date	City	Country	Venue
North America
November 16, 2006	Uncasville	United States	Mohegan Sun Arena
November 18, 2006	Verona	United States	Turning Stone Event Center
November 20, 2006	Rama	Canada	Casino Rama Entertainment Centre
November 21, 2006	Rama	Canada	Casino Rama Entertainment Centre
November 22, 2006	Rama	Canada	Casino Rama Entertainment Centre
February 14, 2007	Santa Rosa	United States	Grace Pavilion
February 15, 2007	Santa Ynez	United States	Samala Showroom
February 16, 2007	Indio	United States	Fantasy Springs Special Events Center
February 17, 2007	Primm	United States	Star of the Desert Arena
Europe
March 6, 2007	Horsens	Denmark	Forum Horsens
March 7, 2007	Horsens	Denmark	Forum Horsens
March 10, 2007	Bergen	Norway	Vestlandshallen
March 11, 2007	Karlstad	Sweden	Löfbergs Lila Arena
March 13, 2007	Gothenburg	Sweden	Scandinavium
March 15, 2007	Oslo	Norway	Oslo Spektrum
March 16, 2007	Stockholm	Sweden	Stockholm Globe Arena
March 18, 2007	Zwolle	Netherlands	IJsselhallen
March 19, 2007	London	United Kingdom	Wembley Arena
March 20, 2007	Manchester	United Kingdom	Manchester Evening News Arena
March 21, 2007	Newcastle	United Kingdom	Metro Radio Arena
March 23, 2007	Glasgow	United Kingdom	Clyde Auditorium
March 24, 2007	Sheffield	United Kingdom	Hallam FM Arena
March 25, 2007	London	United Kingdom	Wembley Arena
March 27, 2007	Cardiff	United Kingdom	Cardiff International Arena
March 28, 2007	Birmingham	United Kingdom	NEC Arena
March 30, 2007	Belfast	United Kingdom	Odyssey Arena
April 1, 2007	Dublin	Ireland	Point Theatre
April 2, 2007	Belfast	United Kingdom	Odyssey Arena
North America
May 10, 2007	Niagara Falls	Canada	Avalon Ballroom
May 11, 2007	Niagara Falls	Canada	Avalon Ballroom
May 12, 2007	Niagara Falls	Canada	Avalon Ballroom
May 20, 2007	Kodak	United States	Smokies Park

== Cancelled shows ==
List of cancelled concerts, showing date, city, country, venue, and reason for cancellation
Date	City	Country	Venue	Reason
March 13, 2007	Helsinki	Finland	Helsinki Arena	Low ticket sales
March 31, 2007	Millstreet	Ireland	Green Glens Arena	Unknown

== Personnel ==
=== The Mighty Fine Band ===
- Band Leader, Guitar: Kent Wells
- Drums: Steve Turner
- Piano: Paul Hollowell
- Fiddle: Jimmy Mattingly
- Dobro, Guitar: Richie Owens
- Banjo: Bruce Watkins
- Keyboard: Michael Davis
- Background vocals: Jennifer O'Brien, Vicki Hampton & Richard Dennison

=== Other Staff ===
- Dolly Parton's Personal Tour Manager: Don Warden
- Tour Manager: Dave Fowler
- Production Assistant: Levi Kennedy
- Director, Staging & Choreography: Steve Summers
- Lighting Designer: Justin Kitchenman
- Stage Manager & Security: Danny Nozzell
- Merchandising: Ira Parker
