= Backwoods Barbie Tour =

2008 concert tour by Dolly Parton

- Tour by Dolly Parton
- Promotional poster for 2008 tour
- Associated album: Backwoods Barbie
- Start date: March 28, 2008
- End date: November 19, 2008
- Legs: 4
- No. of shows: 47 in North America; 17 in Europe; 64 Total

Dolly Parton concert chronology
- An Evening with Dolly Parton (2006–2007); Backwoods Barbie Tour (2008); Better Day World Tour (2011)

The Backwoods Barbie Tour was the ninth headlining concert tour by American recording artist, Dolly Parton. Visiting the United States, Northern Europe and Canada, the tour supported her 42nd studio album, Backwoods Barbie. The tour was well received by critics and spectators alike, earning more than nine million dollars in 2008. The European leg of the tour was the most successful outing of Parton's touring history, performing for 170,000 spectators in the United Kingdom, Sweden, Denmark, Norway and the Netherlands. The tour was expected to reach Australia as well but this did not come to fruition.

== Background ==
After completing her previous trek, Parton focused on the upcoming musical 9 to 5: The Musical and recording her next album. The singer also started her own independent record label after being told she was "too old" for mainstream music. While promoting the song, "Better Get to Livin'", Parton announced her upcoming tour. The first dates revealed in Los Angeles, New York City and Chicago served as rehearsal shows before Parton played in arenas, theatres, amphitheatres and stadiums in North America and Northern Europe. The tour was set to run from February to June, however, it was expanded several times to meet public demand.

To introduce the tour, Parton remarked:

"I had this product that I wanted to sell. It was my performing. I try to think of it as the music business, and you can't just throw it out to anyone and then move on to a new product. So I got involved. God created me, but he gave me the go-ahead to do what I could with it."

Before the tour began, Parton positioned the first round of dates in the United States due to back issues. The singer poked fun at her condition saying, "I know I have been breaking my neck and bending over backwards trying to get my new 'Backwoods Barbie' CD and world tour together, but I didn't mean to hurt myself doing it, But hey, you try wagging these puppies around a while and see if you don't have back problems. Seriously though, the doctors said I will be good as new in a few weeks, and I can't wait to get back out there." The tour began in March instead of early February. After her rehearsal dates, the tour officially commenced on April 22, 2008, at the Benedum Center for the Performing Arts in Pittsburgh, Pennsylvania.

=== Death rumor ===
After Parton finished her European leg, rumors circulated the Internet of her death. It was believed this rumor began at a high school football game (in Tennessee) as the crowd gave a moment of silence for her death. FOX News later reported the singer died in early August of congestive heart failure at the Fort Sanders Sevier Medical Center. Parton and her manager dispelled this rumor, stating the singer was "alive and well", although Parton joked she nearly had a heart attack upon hearing the news of her death, but laughed it off.

== Critical reception ==
Overall, the majority of feedback from music critics was favorable for the tour. Ben Ratliff (The New York Times) describes Parton's performance at the Radio City Music Hall as “nothing short of uplifting”. He further comments that, “Between the songs and her nonstop patter — she is an assassin of dead air — the show was a seminar on the peril of accepting received wisdom, whether the subject was drag queens, the rural poor, working stiffs, politicians, Pentecostalists, [sic?] young media stars or bosomy women. She granted pretty much everybody a complex interior life, and the power of independent thought.” For the same concert, Mandi Bierly (Entertainment Weekly) felt the highlight of the show was Parton's “banter”. She elaborated, “"I never leave a rhinestone unturned", she said, heading to her studded white piano. And, as the headline states, she's got the best stage banter in the business. She's sufficiently quippy, but also shares her life story. After the jump, some of her greatest hits.”

During the European leg, the reviews commended Parton's stage personality and interaction with the audience. Edwin McFee (The Belfast Telegraph) thought Parton's concert at the Odyssey Arena proved her star power. He penned, “She sings, she dances, she plays no less than six musical instruments and she also tells us stories of her childhood as if we were the first ones to hear them, though Dolly fanatics have probably heard them a million times before. At times it was actually quite surreal listening to evergreen anthems such as ‘Jolene’ performed with as much passion as if they were recorded only yesterday, and in many ways her show was a masterclass in traditional old school musical theatre.” David Sinclair (The Times) found the concert at the Glasgow SECC to be "all about the music". He wrote, “…But, in the end, it all came back to the songs. Here she insisted was where the essence of her personality could always be found. I might look artificial/ But where it counts I'm real, she sang in the title track of Backwoods Barbie. And in a funny way, she is.”

Madeleine Brindley (Western Mail) believed Parton's concert at the Cardiff International Arena, Wales proved her to be the First Lady of Country and Western the world over. Brindley explained, “As last night amply demonstrated, Dolly has lost none of her songwriting, or story-telling, talents, as almost every number was prefaced by a short story, which gave us the tiniest of glimpses into the thought process which drives this diminutive star.” David Smyth (Evening Standard) gave the concert at The O_{2} Arena four out of five stars. Smyth stated, “Tracks representing the jolly country pop of her latest album, the knowingly-titled Backwoods Barbie, fitted in well, especially the man-baiting 'Shinola'. It was only when she stopped the gabbing and rolled out hits in quick succession that the crowd rose to its feet and remained there. 'Here You Come Again', 'Islands In The Stream', '9 to 5' and the biggest of the big ballads, 'I Will Always Love You', confirmed that while she weaves a good yarn, it's when Dolly Parton sings that she's really on-song.”

Returning to the United States, the praise for the tour continued. Annie Zaleski (Riverfront Times) wrote that the performance at the Fabulous Fox Theatre was “charming, meeting all expectations.” She continued, “Also fantastic was the ease with which she transitioned from such seemingly different instruments—all of which were white and covered in rhinestones. For "Thank God I’m a Country Girl", she flew through fiddle, banjo, and harmonica, all feverishly supplied by her "useful and ornamental" hick Chippendale (Steve Summers) who dosey-doed in shirtless abandon in overalls nearby.” Evan Rytlewski (Shepherd Express) wrote of Parton's stage persona, during her concert at Milwaukee’s Riverside Theater, "Parton's hokey facade is a remnant of the old Las Vegas/Grand Ole Opry era of entertainment, and it still dominates her concerts. She spent nearly as much of her performance Monday night sharing stories and cracking jokes as she did singing, proving herself quite the comedian. At 62, she's part-grandmother (she riffed on her poor eyesight and mortality), part-cougar (she ogled a dancing beefcake), and her sharp quips had the audience roaring with laughter."

== Set list ==
This set list is representative of the August 14 show in West Hollywood, California. It is not representative of all concerts for the duration of the tour

1. "Two Doors Down"
2. "Why'd You Come in Here Lookin' Like That"
3. "Jolene"
4. "Thank God I'm a Country Girl"
5. "I'm Little, But I'm Loud"
6. "Backwoods Barbie"
7. "White Limozeen"
8. "Drives Me Crazy"
9. Shattered Image"
10. "Coat of Many Colors"
11. "Only Dreamin'"
12. Gospel Medley: "Brother Love's Travelling Salvation Show" / "I'll Fly Away" / "When the Saints Go Marching In" / "Old Time Religion" / "Calm on the Water" / "Daddy Was an Old Time Preacher Man"
13. "Baby I'm Burnin'"
14. "Better Get to Livin'"
15. "Shinola"
16. "The Grass Is Blue"
17. "Great Balls of Fire"
18. "Puppy Love"
19. "Little Sparrow"
20. "Here You Come Again"
21. "Islands in the Stream"
22. "9 to 5"
23. "I Will Always Love You"

Encore

24. "He's Alive"
25. Jesus and Gravity"

== Broadcasts and recordings ==
The concerts at The O_{2} Arena in London were filmed for a concert special and DVD release. The concert special, "Dolly: Live in London O2 Arena", aired on PBS in conduction with their summer pledge drive. The concert was later released as a CD/DVD package titled, "Dolly: Live from London". Parton released the live version of "Here You Come Again" to promote the package.

In 2011, the concert was reissued exclusively to Cracker Barrel stores as An Evening With Dolly Parton. The DVD remains unchanged and contains all of the material from the original release. The CD removes most of the songs from the Backwoods Barbie album with the exception of "Only Dreamin'", but adds two bonus unreleased live tracks, "Shattered Image" and "My Tennessee Mountain Home." In stark contrast to the original release, which charted as an album on the Billboard 200 at #195 and sold poorly, An Evening With Dolly Parton reached #2 on the Billboard Music Video Charts and eventually sold well enough to receive a Gold Music Video certification from the RIAA for shipments of over 50,000 copies.

== Tour dates ==
Date	City	Country	Venue
North America
March 28, 2008	West Hollywood	United States	Roxy Theatre
March 30, 2008 (Note: Originally scheduled for February 11, 2008.)	Chicago	United States	Park West
April 2, 2008 (Note: Originally scheduled for February 13, 2008.)	New York City	United States	Highline Ballroom
April 22, 2008 (Note: Originally scheduled for March 3, 2008.)	Pittsburgh	United States	Benedum Center for the Performing Arts
April 23, 2008 (Note: Originally scheduled for March 4, 2008.)	Hershey	United States	Hershey Theatre
April 25, 2008 (Note: Originally scheduled for March 9, 2008.)	Uncasville	United States	Mohegan Sun Arena
April 26, 2008	Binghamton	United States	Broome County Veterans Memorial Arena
April 28, 2008 (Note: Originally scheduled for March 11, 2008.)	Fairfax	United States	Patriot Center
April 29, 2008 (Note: Originally scheduled for March 12, 2008.)	Atlanta	United States	Fox Theatre
May 1, 2008 (Note: Originally scheduled for March 7, 2008.)	New York City	United States	Radio City Music Hall
May 3, 2008 (Note: Originally scheduled for March 8, 2008.)	Atlantic City	United States	Borgata Event Center
May 5, 2008 (Note: Originally scheduled for March 5, 2008.)	Boston	United States	Boston Opera House
May 7, 2008 (Note: Originally scheduled for February 28, 2008.)	Minneapolis	United States	Northrop Memorial Auditorium
May 8, 2008 (Note: Originally scheduled for February 29, 2008.)	Chicago	United States	Chicago Theatre
May 9, 2008	Chicago	United States	Chicago Theatre
May 11, 2008 (Note: Originally scheduled for March 15, 2008.)	Grand Prairie	United States	Nokia Theatre at Grand Prairie
Europe
June 13, 2008	Stockholm	Sweden	Stockholm Olympic Stadium
June 14, 2008	Malmö	Sweden	Malmö Stadion
June 15, 2008	Viborg	Denmark	Viborg Stadion
June 17, 2008	Kristiansand	Norway	Sør Arena
June 19, 2008	Rotterdam	Netherlands	Rotterdam Ahoy
June 21, 2008 (Note: Part of Live at the Marquee)	Cork	Ireland	The Docklands
June 22, 2008	Kilkenny	Ireland	Nowlan Park
June 24, 2008	Belfast	Ireland	Odyssey Arena
June 25, 2008	Belfast	Ireland	Odyssey Arena
June 27, 2008	Glasgow	England	Scottish Exhibition and Conference Centre
June 28, 2008	Manchester	England	Manchester Evening News Arena
June 29, 2008	Glasgow	England	Scottish Exhibition and Conference Centre
July 1, 2008	Nottingham	England	Trent FM Arena Nottingham
July 2, 2008	Birmingham	England	National Indoor Arena
July 4, 2008	Cardiff	England	Cardiff International Arena
July 5, 2008	London	England	The O_{2} Arena
July 6, 2008	London	England	The O_{2} Arena
North America
August 1, 2008	San Diego	United States	Humphrey's Concert by the Bay
August 3, 2008	Los Angeles	United States	Greek Theatre
August 4, 2008	Sacramento	United States	ARCO Arena
August 5, 2008	Berkeley	United States	Hearst Greek Theatre
August 7, 2008	Portland	United States	Theater of the Clouds
August 8, 2008	Seattle	United States	WaMu Theater
August 10, 2008	Denver	United States	Ellie Caulkins Opera House
August 11, 2008	Omaha	United States	Qwest Center Arena
August 13, 2008	Clarkston	United States	DTE Energy Music Theatre
August 14, 2008	St. Louis	United States	Fox Theatre
August 16, 2008	Pigeon Forge	United States	Dolly Parton Celebrity Theatre
August 17, 2008	Pigeon Forge	United States	Dolly Parton Celebrity Theatre
October 17, 2008	Boca Raton	United States	Count de Hoernle Amphitheater
October 18, 2008	Orlando	United States	UCF Arena
October 20, 2008	Clearwater	United States	Ruth Eckerd Hall
October 21, 2008	Jacksonville	United States	Jacksonville Veterans Memorial Arena
October 24, 2008	Atlanta	United States	Chastain Park Amphitheater
October 25, 2008	Richmond	United States	Brock Auditorium
October 26, 2008	Louisville	United States	Palace Theatre
November 1, 2008	Providence	United States	Providence Performing Arts Center
November 2, 2008	Ledyard	United States	MGM Grand Theatre
November 5, 2008	Raleigh	United States	RBC Center
November 6, 2008	Norfolk	United States	Constant Convocation Center
November 7, 2008	Reading	United States	Reading Eagle Theater
November 9, 2008	Orillia	Canada	Casino Rama Entertainment Centre
November 10, 2008	Orillia	Canada	Casino Rama Entertainment Centre
November 13, 2008	Winnipeg	Canada	MTS Centre
November 14, 2008	Saskatoon	Canada	Credit Union Centre
November 17, 2008	Milwaukee	United States	Riverside Theater
November 18, 2008	Green Bay	United States	Resch Center
November 19, 2008	Des Moines	United States	Civic Center of Greater Des Moines

=== Cancelled shows ===
List of cancelled concerts, showing date, city, country, venue, and reason for cancellation
Date	City	Country	Venue	Reason
March 14, 2008 (Note: Part of South by Southwest.)	Austin	United States	Austin Music Hall	Unknown
October 31, 2008	Newark	United States	Prudential Hall	Unknown

=== Box office score data ===
Venue	City	Tickets sold / available	Gross revenue
Hershey Theatre	Hershey	1,907 / 1,928 (99%)	$150,762
Patriot Center	Fairfax	2,958 / 5,027 (59%)	$260,647
Fox Theatre	Atlanta	4,216 / 4,670 (90%)	$309,791
Radio City Music Hall	New York City	5,824 / 5,824 (100%)	$466,728
Borgata Event Center	Atlantic City	2,050 / 2,259 (91%)	$159,720
Northrop Memorial Auditorium	Minneapolis	2,928 / 4,474 (65%)	$199,400
Chicago Theatre	Chicago	5,821 / 6,843 (85%)	$524,378
Nokia Theatre at Grand Prairie	Grand Prairie	4,069 / 4,173 (97%)	$270,505
The Docklands	Cork	5,000 / 5,000 (100%)	$584,786
Nowlan Park	Kilkenny	18,103 / 20,000 (90%)	$2,256,876
Odyssey Arena	Belfast	13,025 / 14,000 (93%)	$1,508,715
Greek Theatre	Los Angeles	4,695 / 5,295 (89%)	$394,960
ARCO Arena	Sacramento	4,533 / 11,752 (39%)	$174,378
Hearst Greek Theatre	Berkeley	3,501 / 4,200 (83%)	$280,225
Theatre of the Clouds	Portland	2,884 / 3,074 (94%)	$143,535
Qwest Center Arena	Omaha	1,706 / 3,885 (44%)	$123,069
DTE Energy Music Theatre	Clarkston	10,586 / 15,274 (69%)	$145,329
Count de Hoernle Amphitheater	Boca Raton	2,056 / 3,408 (60%)	$102,117
Ruth Eckerd Hall	Clearwater	1,776 / 2,025 (88%)	$223,845
Jacksonville Veterans Memorial Arena	Jacksonville	2,481 / 5,841 (42%)	$149,325
Chastain Park Amphitheater	Atlanta	4,241 / 6,700 (63%)	$267,545
Palace Theatre	Louisville	1,873 / 2,587 (72%)	$162,020
RBC Center	Raleigh	2,663 / 4,989 (53%)	$154,270
Constant Convocation Center	Norfolk	2,100 / 5,973 (35%)	$103,738
Reading Eagle Theater	Reading	2,144 / 4,915 (44%)	$116,179
TOTAL		113,143 / 154,116 (73%)	$9,232,843
