= Those Were the Days (Dolly Parton album) =

Studio album by Dolly Parton
- Released: October 11, 2005
- Recorded: 2004–2005
- Studios: Two Monkeys (Nashville); Stir Studio (Cardiff); Tracking Room at Masterfonics (Nashville); Dollywood's Celebrity Theater (Pigeon Forge); Ocean Way (Nashville); Minutiae Studio (Nashville); Avatar (New York); Kensal Town Studio D (London); No Can Beat Studios (Hana); Taylor Made (North Caldwell); Sound on Sound (New York City); Chartmaker (Malibu, California)
- Genres: Country folk; bluegrass
- Length: 43:50
- Labels: Sugar Hill; Blue Eye
- Producer: Dolly Parton

Dolly Parton chronology
The Essential Dolly Parton (2005)	Those Were the Days (2005)	Backwoods Barbie (2008)

Singles from Those Were the Days
- 1. "Imagine" Released: September 27, 2005; 2. "Both Sides Now" Released: December 2005; 3. "The Twelfth of Never" Released: January 2006; 4. "Where Do the Children Play" Released: March 20, 2006

Those Were the Days is the forty-first solo studio album by American singer-songwriter Dolly Parton. It was released on October 11, 2005, by Sugar Hill Records and Blue Eye Records. The album is a collection of covers of 1960s and 1970s folk and pop songs performed in a bluegrass style, some featuring the artists who originally recorded them. Parton supported the album with the Vintage Tour from August through December 2005.

== Background ==
The album was originally titled Blue Smoke and expected to be released in the first half of 2005. It was to feature a few original songs in addition to covers of 1960s and 1970s folk and pop songs. Parton had performed several tracks intended for the album on the Hello, I'm Dolly Tour in 2004, including "Blue Smoke", "I Dreamed About Elvis", "Me and Bobby McGee", and "Imagine". Parton confirmed to the Knoxville News-Sentinel that guest performers on the album would include folk legends Judy Collins and Joni Mitchell. Keith Urban was confirmed to have recorded a duet with Parton for the album in October 2004 by Country Now. Sugar Hill Records confirmed in January 2005 that no release date had been set for the album, and the completed project had not yet been submitted to the label for release. In March 2005, Steve Buckingham, Parton's longtime producer, confirmed to Dollymania that she had completed several tracks for the album, but it was unfinished and had been put on hold while Parton began composing songs for 9 to 5: The Musical. Joe Nichols told the Arkansas Democrat-Gazette in May 2005 that he had recorded "If I Were a Carpenter" with Parton for her next album.

While speaking at a CMA Music Festival press conference in June 2005, Parton announced that she had been in the studio finishing up her next album and expected it to be released in October. She also stated that its title had changed from Blue Smoke to Those Were the Days and that she was in the preliminary stages of planning a tour for the fall of 2005. Parton also confirmed that Keith Urban had recorded "Twelfth of Never" with her for the album and that Tommy James joined her for "Crimson and Clover".

In a June 2005 article for the New York Post, gossip columnist Liz Smith published a list of guest artists for the album including Norah Jones, Sarah McLachlan, Keith Urban, Joni Mitchell, Sean Lennon, Yusef Islam, David Foster and Joe Nichols. Following the articles publication, Steve Buckingham stated that Sean Lennon, Yusuf Islam and Sarah McLachlan had been approached about recording for the project, but none had confirmed their participation. He also noted that Joni Mitchell, who was originally to appear on the album, had to cancel her recording session due to an illness in her family. The month of July also saw the confirmation of Nickel Creek, Rhonda Vincent, Kris Kristofferson, Roger McGuinn, Mary Hopkin, Alison Krauss, and Yusef Islam's participation on the album. Parton told Jon Stewart in an interview on Daily Show to promote the album that she had invited Bob Dylan to sing on "Blowin' in the Wind", but that he declined. She added that she was not sure whether Dylan himself declined or the refusal came from his management.

The album's title track was recorded on July 1 with Porter Wagoner, Jack Greene, George Hamilton IV, Jan Howard, George Jones, Brenda Lee, Mel McDaniel, Jimmy C. Newman, Jeannie Seely, and Billy Walker.

The album's original title track, "Blue Smoke", would remain unreleased until Parton included it as the title track of her 2014 album.

== Release and promotion ==
The album was formally announced by Sugar Hill Records on August 10, 2005. Welk Music Group president Kevin Welk said that the focus of the album's promotional campaign was the 25–50 age group. To reach this audience, in addition to the tour, TV appearances and internet promotions, the label set up several promotional campaigns with retailers across the county. In early October, Borders Books and Music began selling an album sampler which included Parton's duet with Joe Nichols on "If I Were a Carpenter" and snippets of three other album tracks. The sampler came with a $5 coupon toward the purchase of the album. The album was released on October 11, 2005.

=== Singles ===
Parton's cover of John Lennon's "Imagine" with David Foster was released as an iTunes exclusive single on September 27 and serviced to country, bluegrass, and adult contemporary radio stations on November 7. The music video for "Imagine" was shot in New York City during the weekend of October 21–23 and features private home videos of John Lennon and Yoko Ono. The video premiered on CMT's website on November 28 and made its television debut three days later on CMT Top 20 Countdown.

"Both Sides Now" with Judy Collins and Rhonda Vincent began receiving unsolicited airplay in November and was subsequently released as the album's second single in December. It went on to peak at number one on the Indie World Country Singles Chart in March 2006.

In January 2006, "The Twelfth of Never" with Keith Urban was released as a single exclusively in Urban's native Australia. The single peaked at number three on the Country Tracks Top 30 chart.

"Where Do the Children Play" was released as a single in Europe on March 20, 2006, and did not chart.

=== Tour ===
In August 2005, Parton embarked on the Vintage Tour to promote the album's upcoming release. The tour consisted of 42 dates across North America and concluded in December 2005.

=== Television appearances ===
On September 30, 2005, Parton made an appearance on Late Night with Conan O'Brien and performed "Me and Bobby McGee". She appeared on Good Morning America on October 13 and performed the album's first single, "Imagine". Parton appeared on The Daily Show on October 17 and The View on October 19 where she performed "Me and Bobby McGee". Parton continued to promote the album in November with an appearance on The Early Show where she performed "9 to 5" and "Imagine". She also made an appearance on The Tony Danza Show on November 24 and performed "Imagine".

== Critical reception ==
Professional ratings
Review scores
Source	Rating
AllMusic	3/5 stars
The Encyclopedia of Popular Music	3/5 stars
Now	3/5 stars
The Observer	4/5 stars
Paste	3.5/5 stars
PopMatters	7/10 stars

The album received generally positive reviews from music critics. Paul Flynn of the Observer gave the album four out of five stars, calling the album "an anti-war karaoke party" that "wouldn't work if she didn't mean it." Billboard published a review of the album saying, "It is hard not to like a Dolly Parton record. The legend has such an appealing voice, full of warmth and tenderness (and fiery spunk when she wants), and it is put to great use on Those Were the Days. This covers set highlights many poignant hits from the late '50s through the '70s, all produced with the same spirit heard on her recent bluegrass albums." The review praised Parton's duet with Joe Nichols on "If I Were a Carpenter", saying that it "could be a surprise country radio hit." Thomas Erlewine of AllMusic gave the album three out of five stars and said, "The arrangements are at once tasteful, imaginative, and relatively unsurprising. just vivid, successful, slight reworkings of familiar songs that make them sound fresh again." He went on to say that the album is "yet another very good album, one with no weak spots" and said that Parton has "turned into one of the more reliable country music veterans of the 2000s." Writing for Paste, Dave Simms said, "Each song’s effectiveness increases in proportion to its bluegrass content, which seems to relax Dolly and bring out the subtler, more believable inflections in her considerable vocal arsenal. Days is a solid yet occasionally problematic effort."

In a review for No Depression, Peter Blackstock questioned Parton's authenticity saying that the album "seem[s] in stark contrast not just politically, but religiously" from her previous album, For God and Country. He goes on to say that it looks as if Parton may have been "latching onto the majority support for the Iraq war shortly after it began, then turn[ed] against it in the wake of shifting public sentiment." He continues, "Yet one would think — indeed, expect — Parton is not only wiser than that, but more genuine as well. Perhaps when she affirms her devotion to both patriotism and peace, she's seeking to underscore that those notions are not mutually exclusive, despite the tendency to differentiate them in the current political climate. And maybe, when she sings John Lennon's words, she's acknowledging, in the face of her own devout faith, that it's vital to accept the differing beliefs of others." Parton issued a statement about these criticisms in a press release prior to the album's release. She said, "It’s like [these songs] were written the day before yesterday. Whatever war it may be, someone is going off to die somewhere. I am not protesting anything. I am not political. But I am a patriot and peace-loving." Ben Ratliff of The New York Times disagreed with Blackstock's review, saying that "this is by no means a political album. But it is, among other things, a simple nostalgia album, a wartime album, a heading-toward-catastrophe album and a recollection-of-innocence album."

Writing for PopMatters, Roger Holland gave the album a mostly negative review, but scored the album seven out of ten stars. He called the title track "lettuce-limp" and said that it sounds "every bit as authentic as a three dollar bill and as much fun as a root canal in a back street dentist's office." The only songs receiving praise were "If I Were a Carpenter" which was deemed "impressive" and "Imagine", of which he said that "by the time she's finished with it, Parton has me entirely on her side. In a way, this is the story of the album as a whole." Vish Khanna of Exclaim! gave a negative review of the album, calling Parton's take on the songs "far too Sesame Street to be taken seriously." He closed by saying that "virtually every song here would've fared better with minimal accompaniment and Parton's delicate voice."

== Commercial performance ==
The album sold 21,500 copies in its first week of release, debuting and peaking at number 9 on the Billboard Top Country Albums chart and number 48 on the Billboard 200. The album also peaked at number 2 on the Billboard Independent Albums chart. In the United Kingdom the album topped the UK Country Albums Chart and peaked at number 35 on the UK Albums Chart. It also peaked at number 24 in Sweden. The album has sold 151,000 copies in the United States as of October 2006.

== Track listing ==
No.	Title	Writer(s)	Special guest(s)	Length
1.	"Those Were the Days"	Boris Fomin; Gene Raskin	Mary Hopkin, Porter Wagoner & the Opry Gang, and the Moscow Circus	5:00
2.	"Blowin' in the Wind"	Bob Dylan	Nickel Creek	3:21
3.	"Where Have All the Flowers Gone"	Pete Seeger	Norah Jones and Lee Ann Womack	4:04
4.	"The Twelfth of Never"	Lisa Lee Reagan; Emily Bree Stevenson	Keith Urban	3:16
5.	"Where Do the Children Play"	Cat Stevens	Yusuf Islam	3:23
6.	"Me and Bobby McGee"	Kris Kristofferson; Fred Foster	Kris Kristofferson	3:49
7.	"Crimson and Clover"	Tommy James; Peter P. Lucia	Tommy James	3:39
8.	"The Cruel War"	Traditional; arr. by Dolly Parton	Alison Krauss, Mindy Smith, and Dan Tyminski	3:42
9.	"Turn, Turn, Turn"	Pete Seeger	Roger McGuinn	3:17
10.	"If I Were a Carpenter"	James Timothy Hardin	Joe Nichols	2:54
11.	"Both Sides Now"	Joni Mitchell	Judy Collins and Rhonda Vincent	3:33
12.	"Imagine"	John Lennon	David Foster	3:52
Total length:				43:50

== Personnel ==
Adapted from the album liner notes.

- Dolly Parton – lead vocals, harmony vocals, producer

Guest performers

- Judy Collins – special guest on "Both Sides Now"
- David Foster – special guest on "Imagine"
- Mary Hopkin – special guest on "Those Were the Days"
- Yusef Islam – special guest on "Where Do the Children Play"
- Tommy James – special guest on "Crimson and Clover"
- Norah Jones – special guest on "Where Have All the Flowers Gone"
- Alison Krauss – special guest on "The Cruel War"
- Kris Kristofferson – special guest on "Me and Bobby McGee"
- Roger McGuinn – special guest on "Turn, Turn, Turn"
- Moscow Circus – special guest "Those Were the Days"
- Joe Nichols – special guest on "If I Were a Carpenter"
- Nickel Creek — special guest on "Blowin' in the Wind"
- Mindy Smith – special guest on "The Cruel War"
- Dan Tyminski – special guest on "The Cruel War"
- Keith Urban – special guest on "Twelfth of Never"
- Rhonda Vincent – special guest on "Both Sides Now"
- Porter Wagoner – guest vocals on "Those Were the Days"
- Lee Ann Womack – special guest on "Where Have All the Flowers Gone"

Background vocals

- Richard Dennison, Terry Eldredge, Andy Hall, Vicki Hampton, Jamie Johnson, Jennifer O'Brien, Danny Roberts, David Talbot, Chuck Tilley, Kent Wells
- The Opry Gang (Jack Greene, George Hamilton IV, Jan Howard, George Jones, Brenda Lee, Mel McDaniel, Jimmy C. Newman, Jeannie Seely, Pam Tillis, Billy Walker)
- Choir (Robert Bailey, Lisa Bevill, Drew Cline, Lisa Cochran, Angela Cruz, Kim Fleming, Duane Hamilton, Vicki Hampton, John Mark Ivey)
- Children's choir/Kid Connection, Inc. (Kristin Bauer, Callie Cryar, Phoebe Cryar, Katherine Stewart, Emily Webb, Anna Wilson)

Musicians

- David Angell – strings
- Monisa Angell – strings
- Sam Bush – mandolin
- David Davidson – strings
- Richard Dennison – toy piano, Hammond B-3, Wurlitzer
- Stuart Duncan – fiddle
- Terry Eldridge – acoustic guitar
- Conni Ellisor – strings
- David Foster – piano
- Dave Fowler – bass
- Jim Grosjean – strings
- Andy Hall – dobro, harp
- Jim Hoke – harmonica
- Paul Hollowell – piano
- Tom Howard – strings
- Yusef Islam – acoustic guitar
- Tommy James – electric guitar
- Jack Jezioro – strings
- Viktor Krauss – bowed bass
- Anthony LaMarchina – strings
- Bob Mater – drums, percussion
- Jimmy Mattingly – fiddle
- Roger McGuinn – electric guitar
- Tony Rice – acoustic guitar
- Danny Roberts – mandolin
- Carole Robinowitz – strings
- Pam Sixfin – strings
- Terry Smith – bass
- Tony Smith – percussion
- Bryan Sutton – acoustic guitar
- Joey Schmidt – accordion
- David Talbot – banjo
- Chris Thile – mandolin
- Ilya Toshinsky – banjo, dulcimer, mandolika
- Alan Umstead – strings
- Catherine Umstead – strings
- Gary Vonosdale – strings
- Mary Kathryn Vonosdale – strings
- Dr. Ming Wang – Er-hu
- Jay Weaver – bass
- Kent Wells – acoustic guitar, electric guitar, 12-string accent, 6-string bass

Other personnel

- Penny Aust – children's choir (Kid Connection, Inc.) contractor
- Robert Behar – Dolly's wardrobe
- Brandon Bell – assistant engineer (Minutiae Studio)
- Courtney Blooding – assistant engineer (Chartmaker Studios)
- Matt Boynton – engineer (Avatar Studios)
- Steve Buckingham – artist coordinator
- Dennis Carney – photography
- Laurie Casteel – music copyist
- Mike Casteel – music copyist
- Valorie Cole – make-up
- Steve Davis – engineer (Stir Studio)
- Neil DeVor – engineer (Chartmaker Studios)
- Kyle Dickinson – assistant engineer (Two Monkeys Studio)
- Adam Dye – assistant engineer (The Tracking Room at Masterfonics)
- Carl Gorodetsky – strings contractor
- Leslie Hollingstad – assistant
- Tom Howard – choir and strings arrangements
- Tommy James – producer ("Crimson and Clover")
- Scott Kidd – assistant engineer (Two Monkeys Studio)
- Janet McMahan – children's choir (Kid Connection, Inc.) contractor
- Greg Lawrence – assistant engineer (The Tracking Room at Masterfonics)
- Patrick Murphy – engineer (Two Monkeys Studio)
- Gary Paczosa – engineer (Minutiae Studio)
- Ira Parker – artist montage compiler
- Kelly Pribble – engineer (Kensal Town Studio D)
- Benny Quinn – mixing engineer
- Leslie Richter – assistant engineer (Oceanway)
- Cheryl Riddle – hair
- Rose Sanico – Dolly's wardrobe
- Sarah Jane Schmeltzer – engineer (Dollywood's Celebrity Theater)
- Alan Silverman – engineer (Sound on Sound Recording)
- Tony Smith – string arrangement ("Those Were the Days")
- Wendy Stamberger – album package design
- Glenn M. Taylor – engineer (Taylor Made Studios)
- Reed Taylor – second engineer (Sound on Sound Recording)
- Aya Takemura – assistant engineer (Avatar Studios)
- J. Carter Tutwiler – engineer (No Can Beat Studios)
- Sasha Vosk – director of the Moscow Circus
- Kent Wells – music coordinator
- Kristin Wilkinson – music copyist
- Jimmy Wisner – producer ("Crimson and Clover")

== Charts ==
Chart (2005–2006)	Peak position
Australia (ARIA Charts)	120
Australian Country Albums (ARIA)	6
Swedish Albums (Sverigetopplistan)	24
UK Albums (Official Charts)	35
UK Country Albums (Official Charts)	1
US Billboard 200	48
US Top Country Albums (Billboard)	9
US Independent Albums (Billboard)	2
Scottish Albums (Official Charts)	31
