= Down from Dover =

1970 song by Dolly Parton

"Down from Dover" is a song written and performed by Dolly Parton, originally released on Parton's album The Fairest of them All (1970). It was later recorded by many other artists, including Nancy Sinatra & Lee Hazlewood and Marianne Faithfull (on her 2008 covers album Easy Come, Easy Go).

== Theme ==
"Down from Dover" is a tale of a pregnant teenager who's been rejected by her lover and family after her pregnancy is revealed. She moves to work with an elderly woman, while still silently hoping for the father to return from a place called Dover. In the end, the girl goes into labour when there's no one else around. The story ends on a sad note, as the baby turns out to be stillborn, with the narrator taking it as a sign that the baby's father won't be returning from Dover. The idea for the song came to Parton as she rode through Dover, Tennessee on her tour bus.

The song was controversial for the times and Parton has stated in recent interviews that mentor (and uncredited producer) Porter Wagoner told her that she'd never get played on the radio with story songs like that.

Although the song and its parent album weren't a big commercial success, they are still considered highlights from Dolly's early career. All Music Guide says that Down from Dover was "crystallizing Dolly’s eye for detail" and labels it as "the peak of the album".

== Remake ==
Dolly Parton re-recorded the song in 2001 for her album Little Sparrow, with one added verse.

She notably performed the song during her 1983 television special, Dolly in London, filmed at London's Dominion Theatre.

The song was featured as one of the episodes of Dolly Parton’s Heartstrings series on Netflix, which premiered November 22, 2019.
