= Halos & Horns Tour =

2002 concert tour by Dolly Parton

- Tour by Dolly Parton
- Associated album: Halos & Horns
- Start date: July 10, 2002
- End date: December 13, 2002
- Legs: 2

Dolly Parton concert chronology
- Eagle When She Flies Tour (1991–92); Halos & Horns Tour (2002); Hello, I'm Dolly Tour (2004)

The Halos & Horns Tour was a 2002 concert tour by American singer-songwriter Dolly Parton in support of her album Halos & Horns. It was Parton's first large-scale concert tour in approximately a decade and marked a return to regular touring after years in which she had largely limited her live appearances to selected concerts, casino engagements and performances at Dollywood.

Unlike the larger-scale productions associated with some of Parton's earlier tours, the Halos & Horns concerts emphasized an acoustic, roots-oriented sound reflecting the bluegrass and Appalachian influences of Halos & Horns and its predecessors The Grass Is Blue (1999) and Little Sparrow (2001). Parton was accompanied by an eight-piece band featuring acoustic guitar, banjo, dobro, fiddle, mandolin, bass, keyboards and drums.

The tour began in the United States in July 2002 and later traveled to the United Kingdom and Ireland. Parton's London performances marked her first concerts there in nearly two decades.

The final concerts at Dollywood's Celebrity Theatre in Pigeon Forge, Tennessee, on December 12 and 13, 2002, were recorded and later released as the live album and concert video Live and Well in 2004.

== Background ==
Parton had significantly reduced her touring schedule during the 1990s. By the end of that decade, however, she had begun a critically successful return to acoustic country and bluegrass music with The Grass Is Blue, followed by Little Sparrow and Halos & Horns.

Halos & Horns, released in July 2002, continued that roots-oriented direction while mixing Parton originals with interpretations of songs including Bread's "If" and Led Zeppelin's "Stairway to Heaven".

Rather than performing primarily in arenas, Parton booked a number of comparatively intimate theaters and clubs during the American portion of the tour. The Washington Post, reviewing her performance at Washington, D.C.'s 9:30 Club, described the tour as her first large-scale tour in a decade and noted that she was playing venues more commonly associated with younger rock acts.

The concerts largely avoided the elaborate staging associated with some of Parton's previous tours. The musical arrangements instead emphasized acoustic instrumentation and material from her three recent roots-oriented albums, while also incorporating earlier hits such as "Coat of Many Colors", "Jolene", "9 to 5" and "I Will Always Love You". Several of her pop hits, including "Islands in the Stream", "Here You Come Again" and "Two Doors Down", were performed as part of an a cappella medley.

== Critical reception ==
The tour received positive reviews from several major publications. Reviewing the Washington, D.C. concert, David Segal of The Washington Post praised Parton's ability to move between country, bluegrass, gospel and pop, as well as the intimacy of the smaller venue.

The European leg also received favorable notices. Fiona Sturges of The Independent wrote that Parton's return to the United Kingdom followed a period of renewed critical attention prompted by her bluegrass-oriented albums, and described the Hammersmith Apollo audience as spanning country fans, younger pop listeners and gay fans. Carol McDaid of The Observer similarly praised Parton's vocals and storytelling during the London performance, highlighting performances of "Applejack", "Marry Me", "Halos and Horns", "Little Sparrow" and "I Will Always Love You".

== Live recording ==
The December 12 and 13 concerts at the Celebrity Theatre at Dollywood were recorded for a live release. The resulting album, Live and Well, was issued by Sugar Hill Records on September 14, 2004, together with a concert DVD.

The recording documents much of the tour's characteristic set, including material from The Grass Is Blue, Little Sparrow and Halos & Horns, alongside Parton's best-known songs. AllMusic described the recording as capturing Parton during a period of renewed artistic and commercial attention following her return to roots-oriented music.

== Set list ==
The following set list is taken from the December 12–13, 2002 performances at Dollywood's Celebrity Theatre, which were recorded for Live and Well. It does not necessarily represent the set list performed at every show on the tour.

1. "Orange Blossom Special"
2. "Train, Train"
3. "The Grass Is Blue"
4. "Mountain Angel"
5. "Shine"
6. "Little Sparrow"
7. "Rocky Top"
8. "My Tennessee Mountain Home"
9. "Coat of Many Colors"
10. "Smoky Mountain Memories"
11. "Applejack"
12. "Marry Me"
13. "Halos and Horns"
14. "I'm Gone"
15. "Dagger Through the Heart"
16. "If"
17. "After the Gold Rush"
18. "9 to 5"
19. "Jolene"
20. A cappella medley:
  - "Islands in the Stream"
  - "Here You Come Again"
  - "Why'd You Come in Here Lookin' Like That"
  - "Two Doors Down"
21. "We Irish"
22. "Stairway to Heaven"
23. "I Will Always Love You"

Notes

- "Color Me America", "Calm on the Water", "Try", "Down from Dover", "I Don't Wanna Throw Rice", "He's a Go Getter", and "I'll Oilwells Love You" were performed on select dates.

== Tour dates ==
Date	City	Country	Venue
North America
July 10, 2002	New York City	United States	Irving Plaza
July 15, 2002	Washington, D.C.	United States	9:30 Club
July 20, 2002	Nashville	United States	Grand Ole Opry House
July 21, 2002	Nashville	United States	Ryman Auditorium
July 25, 2002	Atlanta	United States	Earthlink Live
July 29, 2002	New Orleans	United States	House of Blues
August 3, 2002	Dallas	United States	Granada Theater
August 7, 2002	West Hollywood	United States	House of Blues
August 10, 2002	Las Vegas	United States	House of Blues
August 13, 2002	Denver	United States	Paramount Theatre
August 17, 2002	Chicago	United States	House of Blues
August 21, 2002	Lowell	United States	Lowell Memorial Auditorium
August 28, 2002	St. Louis	United States	The Pageant Concert NightClub
August 31, 2002	Kansas City	United States	Uptown Theater
September 4, 2002	Sioux Falls	United States	Husby Performing Arts Center
Europe
November 12, 2002	Manchester	England	Bridgewater Hall
November 18, 2002	London	England	Carling Apollo Hammersmith
November 19, 2002	London	England	Carling Apollo Hammersmith
November 23, 2002	Belfast	Northern Ireland	Waterfront Hall
November 26, 2002	Glasgow	Scotland	Clyde Auditorium
November 27, 2002	Glasgow	Scotland	Clyde Auditorium
November 29, 2002	Dublin	Ireland	Point Theatre
North America
December 12, 2002	Pigeon Forge	United States	Celebrity Theater
December 13, 2002	Pigeon Forge	United States	Celebrity Theater
