= Backwoods Barbie =

Studio album by Dolly Parton
- Released: February 26, 2008
- Recorded: 2006–2007
- Studios: Blackbird (Nashville, Tennessee); Kent Wells Production (Nashville, Tennessee); Sound Kitchen (Franklin); Emerald Sound (Nashville, Tennessee)
- Genre: Country
- Length: 48:20
- Label: Dolly
- Producers: Kent Wells; Dolly Parton

Dolly Parton chronology
Those Were the Days (2005)	Backwoods Barbie (2008)	Better Day (2011)

Alternative cover
- Cracker Barrel Collector's Edition cover art

Singles from Backwoods Barbie
- 1. "Better Get to Livin'" Released: August 28, 2007; 2. "Jesus & Gravity" Released: February 12, 2008; 3. "Shinola" Released: July 21, 2008; 4. "Drives Me Crazy" Released: January 12, 2009; 5. "Backwoods Barbie" Released: March 9, 2009

Backwoods Barbie is the forty-second solo studio album by American singer-songwriter Dolly Parton. It was released on February 26, 2008, by Dolly Records. The album was Parton's first mainstream country album in nearly a decade and marked the first release on Parton's own label. Parton embarked on the Backwoods Barbie Tour with 64 dates across North America and Europe from March through November 2008 to support the album.

== Background ==
In the early 2000s, Parton recorded a series of records exploring folk and bluegrass, rather than the slickly produced pop-country of her 1980s and '90's work. Rumors of a new album began to circulate in summer 2006 when Parton was seen at a recording studio in Nashville. A spokesperson for Parton confirmed in July that while she had been in the studio, she was only recording some demos "just for fun" with no plans to release any of the material she had recorded.

In an interview with The News Courier in September, Parton revealed that her next album would be titled Country Is as Country Does and would include a song she had written titled "I Dreamed About Elvis". The song had been performed on the Hello, I'm Dolly Tour in 2004 and was originally to appear on her 2005 album before its title was changed from Blue Smoke to Those Were the Days. Parton revealed in an interview with The Republican that she planned to tour for about three months in 2007 to promote the album's release, which would be sometime in the spring or early summer. She also mentioned that she wrote the album's title track, "Country Is as Country Does", with Mac Davis.

The Press Democrat covered Parton's February 2007 concert in Santa Rosa, where she revealed that the album's title had been changed to Backwoods Barbie and that it would feature a cover of Fine Young Cannibals' "She Drives Me Crazy", Smokey Robinson's "The Tracks of My Tears" and a newly recorded version of her 1966 composition "Put It Off Until Tomorrow" with Emmylou Harris and Rodney Crowell. She added that most of the other songs she had recorded for possible inclusion on the album are ones she had written and they are "solid country things" reflecting her own philosophy of life. Parton told The Las Vegas City Life that she had recorded a song for the album titled "Just a Wee Bit Gay" about a woman and her in-the-closet husband. At a March 2007 concert in London, Parton said she had recorded about 24 songs and hoped to have the album released later the same year. Although she had previously stated that she hoped to tour North America for about three months in the spring or early summer to promote the album, Parton confirmed in April that plans for a tour had been pushed back to late fall to coincide with the album's tentative September release. Parton confirmed to Country Weekly in the July 2007 issue that she was still in the studio recording the album as recently as June when she was in Nashville for her Academy of Country Music Pioneer Award ceremony, and she would not comment on whether or not a tour was scheduled for the fall.

It was confirmed by Danny Nozell to Billboard in August 2007 that the album was scheduled for a February 2008 release on Parton's new label, Dolly Records. He also confirmed that the album's first single would be titled "Better Get to Livin'" and that a world tour was scheduled to begin in March 2008.

Perez Hilton attended an album listening party in Los Angeles in August 2007 and reported that Parton ended the night by playing "Just a Wee Bit Gay", but she stated that the song would not be on the album. The previously announced new version of "Put It Off Until Tomorrow" with Emmylou Harris and Rodney Crowell also failed to make the final track listing.

The album's original title track, "Country Is as Country Does", did not make the final track listing and would remain unreleased until Parton's 2011 album, Better Day. The album's final title track originated from Parton's reworking of her film "9 to 5" into a musical.

== Release and promotion ==
The album's first single, "Better Get to Livin'" was released as an iTunes exclusive on August 28, 2007. It was officially sent to country radio stations on September 28. The music video premiered on CMT's website on November 26 and had its television premiere three days later on CMT Top 20 Countdown. The video, directed by Steve Lippman, is set at a carnival and was filmed on location at a farm in Pigeon Forge, Tennessee. Parton performed "Better Get to Livin'" and "9 to 5" on Dancing with the Stars on September 26. She also performed "Better Get to Livin'" during the Macy's Thanksgiving Day Parade on November 22.

The album was originally scheduled for a February 5, 2008 release, but was pushed back to better coincide with the beginning of the tour. Parton embarked on the Backwoods Barbie Tour to support the album on March 28 and performed 64 dates across North America and Europe before concluding the tour on November 19.

Following the album's February 26 release, the second single, "Jesus & Gravity" was released on February 12. Parton performed the song on a season seven episode of American Idol. The week on Idol was a tribute to her work as a singer and songwriter, with all the contestants performing her songs. The music video for "Jesus & Gravity", directed by Steve Lippman, premiered on Perez Hilton's website on April 14 and was uploaded to Parton's YouTube channel later that day.

"Shinola" was released as the album's third single on July 21. Its music video, directed by Fran Strine, was also premiered on Perez Hilton's website on August 29. The video was filmed during Parton's European tour at a sold-out show at London's O2 Arena. Parton performed the single on The Tonight Show with Jay Leno on September 19. Parton also appeared on The Ellen DeGeneres Show on September 22 where she performed "Shinola" and "9 to 5".

The fourth single, "Drives Me Crazy", was released to adult contemporary radio stations on January 12, 2009.

"Backwoods Barbie" was released as the album's final single on March 9. The song's music video was premiered by AOL the same day. The video was directed by Trey Fanjoy and shows Parton walking down Hollywood Boulevard meeting a cast of interesting characters. It also shows Parton walking through her childhood home in the Smoky Mountains (these shots were actually filmed at the Disney Ranch in California) and features a young Dolly applying homemade make-up of poke berries and burnt matches.

== Critical reception ==
Professional ratings
Aggregate scores
Source	Rating
Metacritic	70/100
Review scores
Source	Rating
AllMusic	3.5/5 stars
Country Universe	4/5 stars
Digital Spy	3/5 stars
Entertainment Weekly	B+
Robert Christgau	(choice cut)

Backwoods Barbie received generally positive reviews from critics. At Metacritic, which assigns a normalized rating out of 100 to reviews from mainstream critics, the album received an average score of 70, which indicates "generally positive reviews", based on 11 reviews. Entertainment Weekly gave the album a B+ and said that it "neatly plays to her storyteller strengths, even as she openly hungers for hits." Jon Pareles of The New York Times gave a positive review, saying that "once again she's the voice of rural innocence all dressed up in big-city trappings, and still coming through as herself." In a positive review, PopMatters said, "A solid half of the album's songs fall into the classic country-music category of heartbreak songs, one way or another: divorce songs, cheating tales, lonely-night confessions. Yet there’s no danger that these songs on similar topics will blur together, because each takes its own approach." Writing for AllMusic, Steve Leggett gave the album three and a half stars and said, "Backwoods Barbie might not break the bank out there, and it would take a good deal of marketing and luck for any of these tracks to hit the top of the new country charts, but it shows that Parton can still deliver the package in fine style and only the fools among us would ever count her down and out, no matter how many bluegrass albums she does." In another positive review, The Boston Globe said, "Parton victoriously retrains the focus back on the part of her chest that is truly meaningful: her heart. She also succeeds in producing a record that, after years of fine niche efforts in bluegrass and gospel, could actually make a bid for mainstream country radio airplay." The Los Angeles Times felt that "the ratio of less-memorable tracks is higher than on those recent bluegrass outings, but there's enough of the Parton who is one of the greatest country writers and singers of the last half-decade to make it worth hearing." Billboard gave a positive review of the album which said, "There's more than meets the eye to Dolly Parton, the autobiographical title cut tells us, and her first mainstream country album in years is an important reminder of the breadth of her singing and songwriting talents."

In a mixed review, Mojo said that the "opener, the self-referencing "Better Get to Livin'" is cheesy and disposable even by Nashville standards. The title track, also autobiographical, is better, but like several songs, suffers from '80s-style over-production." Rolling Stone also gave a mixed review saying that too much of the album "comes off like the overproduced twang of younger country ingénues who try to sound like Dolly Parton."

== Commercial performance ==
Backwoods Barbie debuted at number 2 on the Billboard Top Country Albums chart, number 17 on the Billboard 200, and number 2 on the Billboard Independent Albums chart, selling 27,000 copies in its first week.

In Europe the album peaked at number 35 on the UK Albums Chart, number 6 on the Danish Albums chart, and number 57 on the Swedish Albums chart.

The album has sold 281,000 units in the United States as of December 2020.

The album's first single, "Better Get to Livin'", was released in September 2007 and peaked at number 48 on the Billboard Hot Country Songs chart. "Jesus & Gravity", was released as the second single in March 2008 and peaked at number 56.

== Track listing ==
No.	Title	Writer(s)	Length
1.	"Better Get to Livin'"	Dolly Parton; Kent Wells	3:36
2.	"Made of Stone"	Parton	4:14
3.	"Drives Me Crazy"	Roland Gift; David Steele	4:14
4.	"Backwoods Barbie"	Parton	3:21
5.	"Jesus & Gravity"	Betsy Ulmer; Craig Wiseman	4:42
6.	"Only Dreamin'"	Parton	5:37
7.	"The Tracks of My Tears"	Smokey Robinson; Warren Moore; Marvin Tarplin	3:35
8.	"The Lonesomes"	Parton	3:19
9.	"Cologne"	Parton	3:43
10.	"Shinola"	Parton	4:13
11.	"I Will Forever Hate Roses"	Parton	3:28
12.	"Somebody's Everything"	Parton	4:18
Total length:			52:10

Best Buy bonus track
No.	Title	Writer(s)	Length
13.	"Baby I'm Burnin'" (live)	Parton	2:38
Total length:			48:20

iTunes bonus tracks
No.	Title	Writer(s)	Length
13.	"The Grass Is Blue" (live; pre-order exclusive)	Parton	4:12
14.	"I Will Always Love You" (live)	Parton	3:12
15.	"Better Get to Livin'" (music video)	Parton	4:38

Target bonus tracks
No.	Title	Writer(s)	Length
13.	"Jolene" (live)	Parton	3:04
14.	"Two Doors Down" (live)	Parton	2:15
Total length:			53:39

Walmart bonus track
No.	Title	Writer(s)	Length
13.	"9 to 5" (live)	Parton	2:43
Total length:			51:03

Cracker Barrel Collector's Edition bonus tracks
No.	Title	Writer(s)	Length
13.	"Rose of My Heart"	Parton	2:34
14.	"Hallelujah Holiday"	Parton	2:07
15.	"Berry Pie"	Parton	2:54
Total length:			55:55

== Personnel ==
Adapted from the album liner notes.

- Sam Bacco – percussion
- Rebecca Isaacs Bowman – background vocals
- Mike Brignardello – bass guitar
- Tom Bukovac – electric guitar
- Terry Crisp – steel guitar
- Billy Davis – background vocals
- Richard Dennison – background vocals
- Terry Eldridge – background vocals
- Paul Franklin – steel guitar
- Lloyd Green – steel guitar
- Vicki Hampton – background vocals
- Aubrey Haynie – fiddle, mandolin
- Paul Hollowell – Fender Rhodes, Hammond B-3 organ, keyboards, piano
- Sonya Isaacs – background vocals
- Carl Jackson – background vocals
- Jamie Johnson – background vocals
- Rob McNelley – electric guitar
- Jerry McPherson – electric guitar
- Steve Mackey – bass guitar
- Brent Mason – electric guitar
- Jimmy Mattingly – fiddle, mandolin
- John Mock – bodhran, harmonium, tin whistle
- The Nashville String Machine – strings
- Alecia Nugent – background vocals
- Jennifer O'Brien – background vocals
- Dolly Parton – lead vocals, background vocals
- Hargus "Pig" Robbins – piano
- Marty Slayton – background vocals
- Bryan Sutton – acoustic guitar
- David Talbot – banjo
- Steve Turner – drums, percussion
- Darrin Vincent – background vocals
- Rhonda Vincent – background vocals
- Biff Watson – acoustic guitar
- Derek Wells – electric guitar
- Kent Wells – acoustic guitar, electric guitar
- Kris Wilkinson – string arrangements
- Lonnie Wilson – drums, percussion
- Christine Winslow – background vocals

== Charts ==
=== Weekly charts ===
Chart (2008)	Peak position
Danish Albums (Hitlisten)	6
Irish Albums (IRMA)	60
Scottish Albums (Official Charts)	25
Swedish Albums (Sverigetopplistan)	57
UK Albums (Official Charts)	35
UK Country Albums (Official Charts)	1
US Billboard 200	17
US Independent Albums (Billboard)	2
US Top Country Albums (Billboard)	2

=== Year-end charts ===
Chart (2008)	Position
US Top Country Albums (Billboard)	56
Chart (2009)	Position
US Top Country Albums (Billboard)	70
