= Ultimate Dolly Parton =

Compilation album by Dolly Parton
- Released: June 3, 2003
- Recorded: 1970–1989
- Genres: Country; pop
- Length: 63:22
- Label: RCA Nashville

Dolly Parton chronology
Halos & Horns (2002)	Ultimate Dolly Parton (2003)	For God and Country (2003)

Professional ratings
Review scores
Source	Rating
AllMusic	5/5 stars

Ultimate Dolly Parton is a compilation album by American country music artist Dolly Parton. It was released by RCA Nashville on June 3, 2003. The album peaked at number 5 on the Billboard 200 and number 3 on the Billboard Top Country Albums chart following Parton's death in August 2026.

== Commercial performance ==
Ultimate Dolly Parton opened at number 17 on the UK Albums Chart and spent 7 weeks on the chart. As of August 2026, it has sold over 362,534 copies in the UK.

== Track listing ==
No.	Title	Writer(s)	Length
1.	"Joshua"	Dolly Parton	3:04
2.	"Coat of Many Colors"	Parton	3:04
3.	"Jolene"	Parton	2:41
4.	"I Will Always Love You (original 1974 version)"	Parton	2:55
5.	"Please Don't Stop Loving Me" (with Porter Wagoner)	Parton, Porter Wagoner	2:47
6.	"Love Is Like a Butterfly"	Parton	2:21
7.	"The Bargain Store"	Parton	2:42
8.	"Here You Come Again"	Barry Mann, Cynthia Weil	2:54
9.	"It's All Wrong, But It's All Right"	Parton	3:18
10.	"Heartbreaker"	Carole Bayer Sager, David Wolfert	3:30
11.	"I Really Got the Feeling"	Billy Vera	3:08
12.	"You're the Only One"	Bruce Roberts, Sager, Don Williams	3:20
13.	"Starting Over Again"	Bruce Sudano, Donna Summer	3:58
14.	"Old Flames Can't Hold a Candle to You"	Hugh Moffatt, Pebe Sebert, Rosemary Sebert	3:25
15.	"9 to 5"	Parton	3:00
16.	"But You Know I Love You"	Mike Settle	3:19
17.	"Tennessee Homesick Blues"	Parton	3:23
18.	"Islands in the Stream" (with Kenny Rogers)	Barry Gibb, Maurice Gibb, Robin Gibb	4:10
19.	"To Know Him Is to Love Him" (with Linda Ronstadt and Emmylou Harris)	Phil Spector	3:51
20.	"Why'd You Come in Here Lookin' Like That"	Bob Carlisle, Randy Thomas	2:32

== Charts ==
=== Weekly charts ===
Chart (2003–2026)	Peak position
Australian Albums (ARIA)	49
Canadian Albums (Billboard)	9
European Albums (Eurotipsheet)	66
New Zealand Albums (RMNZ)	3
Scottish Albums (Official Charts)	3
Swedish Albums (Sverigetopplistan)	8
UK Albums (Official Charts)	17
UK Country Compilation Albums (OCC)	1
US Billboard 200	5
US Top Country Albums (Billboard)	3

=== Year-end charts ===
Chart (2019)	Position
US Top Country Albums (Billboard)	87
Chart (2020)	Position
US Top Country Albums (Billboard)	80
Chart (2021)	Position
US Top Country Albums (Billboard)	79
Chart (2022)	Position
US Top Country Albums (Billboard)	56

== Certifications and sales ==
Region	Certification	Certified units/sales
Australia (ARIA)	Platinum	70,000^{‡}
New Zealand (RMNZ)	Platinum	15,000^{‡}
United Kingdom (BPI)	Platinum	362,534
United States (RIAA)	Gold	500,000^{‡}
^{‡} Sales+streaming figures based on certification alone.
