= My Blue Ridge Mountain Boy =

Studio album by Dolly Parton
- Released: September 8, 1969
- Recorded: September 9, 1968–June 2, 1969
- Studio: RCA Studio B (Nashville)
- Genre: Country
- Length: 32:25
- Label: RCA Victor
- Producer: Bob Ferguson

Dolly Parton chronology
| Always, Always (1969) | My Blue Ridge Mountain Boy (1969) | The Fairest of Them All (1970) |

Singles from My Blue Ridge Mountain Boy
- 1. "Daddy" Released: March 10, 1969; 2. "In the Ghetto" Released: June 23, 1969; 3. "My Blue Ridge Mountain Boy" Released: September 8, 1969

My Blue Ridge Mountain Boy is the fourth solo studio album by American singer-songwriter Dolly Parton. It was released on September 8, 1969, by RCA Victor. The album was produced by Bob Ferguson. It peaked at number six on the Billboard Top Country Albums chart, Parton's first solo top ten, and number 194 on the Billboard 200 chart. The album spawned three singles: "Daddy", "In the Ghetto", and the title track. "Daddy" was the most successful, peaking at number 40 on the Billboard Hot Country Songs chart. This would be Parton's final studio release of the 1960s.

== Recording ==
Recording sessions for the album began at RCA Studio B in Nashville, Tennessee, on May 14, 1969. Three additional sessions followed on May 20, 21 and June 2. "Daddy" was recorded on September 9, 1968, during a session for 1969's In the Good Old Days (When Times Were Bad).

== Content ==
The title song tells the story of a small town girl whose aspirations take her to New Orleans, where she becomes a prostitute, dreaming of the boy she'd left behind. "Gypsy, Joe and Me" details the story of a woman, her love and their small dog, who all eventually perish. "Evening Shade" tells the story of an orphanage run by an evil headmistress, Mrs. Bailey. The orphans eventually burn the home down, with Mrs. Bailey sleeping inside. "Daddy", a Parton composition, tells the story of a daughter pleading with her father to reconsider leaving her mother for a woman much younger.

Also included are Parton's covers of the Mac Davis-penned Elvis Presley hit "In the Ghetto" and Joe South's "Games People Play". She also covered current country hits by Porter Wagoner ("Big Wind") and Jan Howard ("We Had All the Good Things Going").

In a CMT interview with Patty Loveless, Parton confirmed that the man on the album cover is her reclusive husband, Carl Dean.

Parton re-recorded the title song for her 1982 album Heartbreak Express.

== Release and promotion ==
The album was released September 8, 1969, on LP and 8-track.

=== Singles ===
The first single from the album, "Daddy", was released in March 1969 and debuted at number 97 on the Billboard Hot Country Songs chart dated April 12. It peaked at number 40 on the chart dated May 31, its eight week on the chart. The single spent ten weeks on the chart. The second single from the album, "In the Ghetto", was released in June 1969 and debuted at number 73 on the Billboard Hot Country Songs chart dated July 26. It peaked at number 50 on the chart dated September 6, its seventh chart week. The single charted for eight weeks. It also peaked at number 12 in Canada on the RPM Country Singles chart. "My Blue Ridge Mountain Boy" was released as the third single in September 1969 and debuted at number 61 on the Billboard Hot Country Songs chart dated October 18. The single peaked at number 45 on the chart dated November 15, its fifth week on the chart. It spent a total eight weeks on the chart. The single also peaked at number 22 in Canada on the RPM Country Singles chart.

== Critical reception ==
Professional ratings
Review scores
| Source | Rating |
|---|---|
| AllMusic | 3/5 stars |
| The Encyclopedia of Popular Music | 3/5 stars |

The review in the September 20, 1969 issue of Billboard stated "Undoubtedly, this is the best composite album that Miss Dolly Parton has created. Her country version of 'In the Ghetto' is now on the country singles chart and should provide plenty of LP sales impetus. While her 'Daddy', 'Gypsy, Joe and Me', and 'Home for Pete's Sake' are tearjerkers in the traditional vein. 'Games People Play' is also a strong contender for honors."

Cashbox also published a review of the album, stating "Dolly Parton effectively changes moods and tempos as she sings her way through this set containing her latest singles in addition to other noteworthy offerings. The set includes, besides title track, 'In the Ghetto', 'Games People Play', 'Big Wind', 'Daddy', and 'We Had All the Good Things Going.' Rapid chart action can be expected on this one."

AllMusic gave the album 3 out of 5 stars.

On a list of the top 50 Dolly Parton songs, Rolling Stone listed the title track at number 31, and "Evening Shade" at number 23.

== Commercial performance ==
The album debuted at number 43 on the Billboard Top Country Albums chart dated October 11, 1969. It peaked at number 6 on the chart dated December 27, its twelfth week on the chart. It charted for 28 weeks. It also marked Parton's first appearance on the Billboard 200 chart, where it peaked at number 194.

== Reissues ==
The album was released as a digital download on October 22, 2013.

== Track listing ==
Side one
| No. | Title | Writer(s) | Recording date | Length |
|---|---|---|---|---|
| 1. | "In the Ghetto" | Mac Davis | June 2, 1969 | 2:50 |
| 2. | "Games People Play" | Joe South | June 2, 1969 | 2:26 |
| 3. | "'Til Death Do Us Part" | Dolly Parton | May 14, 1969 | 3:09 |
| 4. | "Big Wind" | Wayne P. Walker; Alex Zanetis; George McCormick | June 2, 1969 | 2:18 |
| 5. | "Evening Shade" | Parton | May 21, 1969 | 3:22 |
| 6. | "I'm Fed Up With You" | Bill Owens | June 2, 1969 | 2:00 |

Side two
| No. | Title | Writer(s) | Recording date | Length |
|---|---|---|---|---|
| 1. | "My Blue Ridge Mountain Boy" | Parton | May 20, 1969 | 3:32 |
| 2. | "Daddy" | Parton | September 9, 1968 | 2:50 |
| 3. | "We Had All the Good Things Going" | Merv Shiner; Jerry Monday | May 14, 1969 | 2:45 |
| 4. | "The Monkey's Tale" | Leona Ross | May 14, 1969 | 1:51 |
| 5. | "Gypsy, Joe and Me" | Parton | May 21, 1969 | 3:13 |
| 6. | "Home for Pete's Sake" | Rudy Preston | May 14, 1969 | 1:59 |

== Personnel ==
Adapted from the album liner notes and RCA recording session records.

- Joseph Babcock – background vocals
- Jerry Carrigan – drums
- Fred Carter Jr. – guitar
- Pete Drake – pedal steel
- Dolores Edgin – background vocals
- Bob Ferguson – producer
- Lloyd Green – pedal steel
- Milt Henderson – technician
- Junior Huskey – bass
- James Isbell – drums
- Mack Magaha – fiddle
- George McCormick – rhythm guitar
- Wayne Moss – guitar
- Bill Owens – liner notes
- Al Pachucki – recording engineer
- June Page – background vocals
- Dolly Parton – lead vocals
- Hargus Robbins – piano
- Roy Shockley – technician
- Jerry Stembridge – guitar
- Buck Trent – electric banjo

== Charts ==
=== Weekly charts ===
Chart performance for My Blue Ridge Mountain Boy
| Chart (1969) | Peak position |
|---|---|
| US Billboard 200 | 194 |
| US Top Country Albums (Billboard) | 6 |
| US Cashbox Country Albums | 8 |

=== Year-end charts ===
Year-end chart performance for My Blue Ridge Mountain Boy
| Chart (1969) | Peak position |
|---|---|
| US Top Country Albums (Billboard) | 48 |

== Release history ==
Release dates and formats for My Blue Ridge Mountain Boy
| Region | Date | Format | Label | Ref. |
|---|---|---|---|---|
| Various | September 8, 1969 | LP; 8-track | RCA Victor | |
| Various | October 22, 2013 | Digital download | Sony; Legacy | |
