= The Fairest of Them All (album) =

Studio album by Dolly Parton
- Released: February 2, 1970
- Recorded: September 10, 1968–October 31, 1969
- Studio: RCA Studio B (Nashville)
- Genre: Country
- Length: 27:50
- Label: RCA Victor
- Producer: Bob Ferguson

Dolly Parton chronology
My Blue Ridge Mountain Boy (1969)	The Fairest of Them All (1970)	Porter Wayne and Dolly Rebecca (1970)

Singles from The Fairest of Them All
- 1. "Daddy Come and Get Me" Released: December 8, 1969

The Fairest of Them All is the fifth solo studio album by American singer-songwriter Dolly Parton. It was released on February 2, 1970, by RCA Victor. The album was produced by Bob Ferguson. It was the first of Parton's albums on which she wrote the majority of the songs without a co-writer. The Fairest of Them All peaked at number 13 on the Billboard Top Country Albums chart. The album's only single, "Daddy Come and Get Me", peaked at number 40 on the Billboard Hot Country Songs chart.

== Recording ==
Recording sessions for the album began on September 4, 1969, at RCA Studio B in Nashville, Tennessee. Two additional sessions followed on October 30 and 31. "I'm Doing This for Your Sake" was recorded during the September 10, 1968 session for 1969's In the Good Old Days (When Times Were Bad). "Mammie" and "But You Loved Me Then" were recorded during sessions for 1969's My Blue Ridge Mountain Boy, on May 13 and 21, 1969, respectively.

== Content ==
Included is "Down from Dover", a song about the misfortune of a pregnant unwed girl, who waits in vain for the baby's father while being shunned by her parents. The song was controversial for the times and Parton has stated in recent interviews that mentor (and uncredited producer) Porter Wagoner told her that she'd never get played on the radio with story songs like that.

Two other story songs, "Robert" and "Daddy Come and Get Me", are distinctive for their themes. The former tells the story of a boy infatuated with a girl, not knowing that they are brother and sister. The story is a true story based on Parton's life, her father had at least one child with another woman. The latter is a haunting tale, co-written with Dorothy Jo Hope, Parton's aunt, about a woman begging her father to release her from the mental institution that her cheating husband placed her in.

The liner notes for the album were written by Parton’s assistant, friend and confidante, Judy Ogle.

In a CMT interview with Patty Loveless, Parton joked that it was about the funniest album cover she had ever made, with the largest collar she could find. She said she was trying to look like a fairytale character. The cover photo was taken by Bill Goodman, a photographer for the Nashville Banner.

Parton re-recorded "Down from Dover" for her 2001 album Little Sparrow with an additional verse that was cut from the original.

== Release and promotion ==
The album was released February 2, 1970, on LP.

=== Singles ===
The album's only single, "Daddy Come and Get Me", was released in December 1969 and debuted at number 67 on the Billboard Hot Country Songs chart dated January 21, 1970. It peaked at number 40 on the chart dated March 7, its sixth week on the chart. It charted for eight weeks. The single also peaked at number 31 in Canada on the RPM Country Singles chart.

== Critical reception ==
Professional ratings
Review scores
Source	Rating
AllMusic	4.5/5 stars

Billboard's review of the album in the February 14, 1970 issue said, "A very strong album in more ways than one. "Daddy Come and Get Me" is in the traditional jilted love vein, then "Down from Dover" follows. The "Dover" tune is very beautiful and well produced, but the theme is perhaps a little too strong for airplay, even in this day of enlightenment. "Just the Way I Am" is beautiful and not so strong. Dolly Parton is sensational, as usual."

Cashbox published a review in the issue dated February 7, 1970, which said, "Many of Dolly Parton’s male fans will agree that she is "The Fairest of Them All", and all her fans will agree that vocally, she's one of country music's brightest young stars. Teeing off this set with her current single, Dolly goes on to sing a host of strong tunes, most of which are her own compositions. Should be a nice chart spot on tap for this package. Watch it closely for action."

Stephen Thomas Erlewine gave the album 4.5 out of 5 stars in a review for AllMusic. He noted that while the album "lacks any of Dolly Parton’s early masterpieces...it’s one of her strongest early LPs."

== Commercial performance ==
The album debuted at number 38 on the Billboard Top Country Albums chart dated March 14, 1970. It peaked at number 13 on the chart dated May 9, its ninth week on the chart. The album charted for 17 weeks.

== Reissues ==
The album was reissued on CD in 2010 with Parton's 1972 album My Favorite Songwriter, Porter Wagoner. It was released as a digital download on January 11, 2011.

== Track listing ==
All tracks written by Dolly Parton, except where noted.

Side one
No.	Title	Writer(s)	Recording date	Length
1.	"Daddy Come and Get Me"	Parton; Dorothy Jo Hope	October 31, 1969	3:01
2.	"Chas"		October 30, 1969	2:24
3.	"When Possession Gets Too Strong"	Parton; Louis Owens	October 31, 1969	2:04
4.	"Before You Make Up Your Mind"	Bill Owens	October 31, 1969	2:10
5.	"I'm Doing This for Your Sake"		September 10, 1968	2:11
6.	"But You Loved Me Then"		May 21, 1969	1:52

Side two
No.	Title	Recording date	Length
1.	"Just the Way I Am"	October 31, 1969	2:28
2.	"More Than Their Share"	October 31, 1969	2:20
3.	"Mammie"	May 13, 1969	3:11
4.	"Down from Dover"	September 4, 1969	3:46
5.	"Robert"	September 4, 1969	2:39

== Personnel ==
Adapted from the album liner notes and RCA recording session records.

- Joseph Babcock – background vocals
- Jerry Carrigan – drums
- Dolores Edgin – background vocals
- Bob Ferguson – producer
- Bill Goodman – cover photo
- Lloyd Green – pedal steel
- Milton Henderson – recording technician
- Junior Huskey – bass
- Mack Magaha – fiddle
- George McCormick – rhythm guitar
- Wayne Moss – guitar
- Judy H. Ogle – liner notes
- Al Pachucki – recording engineer
- June Page – background vocals
- Dolly Parton – lead vocals
- Hargus Robbins – piano
- Roy Shockley – recording technician
- Jerry Stembridge – guitar
- Buck Trent – electric banjo

== Charts ==
Chart performance for The Fairest of Them All
Chart (1970)	Peak position
US Top Country Albums (Billboard)	13
US Cashbox Country Albums	13

== Release history ==
Release dates and formats for The Fairest of Them All
Region	Date	Format	Title	Label	Ref.
Various	February 2, 1970	LP	The Fairest of Them All	RCA Victor	
United States	August 17, 2010	CD	The Fairest of Them All / My Favorite Songwriter, Porter Wagoner	Omni	
Various	January 11, 2011	Digital download	The Fairest of Them All	Sony; Legacy	
