= For God and Country (Dolly Parton album) =

For God And Country

Studio album by Dolly Parton
- Released: November 11, 2003
- Recorded: 2003
- Studio: Two Monkeys Productions (Nashville)
- Genres: Country; gospel; patriotic
- Length: 72:06
- Labels: Welk Music Group; Blue Eye
- Producers: Dolly Parton; Kent Wells; Tony Smith

Dolly Parton chronology
| Ultimate Dolly Parton (2002) | For God And Country (2003) | Live and Well (2004) |

Singles from For God And Country
- 1. "Welcome Home" Released: November 2003; 2. "Light Of A Clear Blue Morning" Released: May 2004

For God And Country is the fortieth solo studio album by American singer-songwriter Dolly Parton. It was released on November 11, 2003, by Welk Music Group and Blue Eye Records. The album was produced by Parton with Kent Wells and Tony Smith. It is considered Parton's musical attempt to deal with the aftermath of the September 11, 2001 attacks. Included are covers of famous patriotic songs and new Parton originals. The album is perhaps best remembered for its cover photo, depicting Parton posing as though appearing in a vintage USO poster, in a costume designed by Robért Behar.

== Background ==
Parton appeared on the June 3, 2003 episode of MWL Star to premiere the music video for "I'm Gone" from her 2002 album, Halos & Horns. In addition to premiering the music video, she announced that she planned to release a new album in the fall titled For God and Country, containing inspirational and patriotic songs. She performed one song from the album, "I'm Gonna Miss You", and "9 to 5". On June 18, Parton made an appearance at a preview of her Dixie Stampede's new Orlando location, where she performed "Color Me America", which was used as the show's finale. She said she planned to include the song on her next album and that it should be released by September 11. On July 3, Parton appeared on Good Day Live, where she announced that the album had been pushed back to early 2004. That evening, Parton was interviewed on Larry King Live, where she said that she planned to tour in 2004 to promote the album and that it would be a larger-scale event, describing it as her first big tour in several years. She also announced two more song titles from the album, "Peace in the Valley" and "Whispering Hope". The following night, Parton headlined the 2003 A Capitol Fourth Independence Day concert. The special aired live from the West Lawn of the U.S. Capitol in Washington. She performed two songs from the album, "Light of a Clear Blue Morning" and "When Johnny Comes Marching Home", in addition to "9 to 5".

== Release and promotion ==
The album was formally announced by Welk Music Group on August 26 with the album's release date, artwork, and track listing being revealed.

Parton appeared on the September 11 episode of The John Walsh Show, where she performed two new songs that would be included on the album: "Color Me America" and "Brave Little Soldier".

On November 5, Parton appeared on The Early Show and performed "Color Me America" and "Welcome Home", which she announced would be the album's first single.

The album was released on November 11. Parton made an appearance on The Late Show with David Letterman the following evening, where she performed "Red, White and Bluegrass". On November 13, Parton appeared on Late Night with Conan O'Brien and performed "Light of a Clear Blue Morning" and "I Will Always Love You".

The music video for the album's first single, "Welcome Home", was shot over the January 10–11, 2004 weekend. It was premiered by CMT on February 4.

Parton made an appearance on Live with Regis and Kelly on May 7, where she performed "Light of a Clear Blue Morning" and announced that it would be the album's second single. She performed the song again on the May 20 episode of The Ellen DeGeneres Show, in addition to "9 to 5".

== Critical reception ==
Professional ratings
Review scores
| Source | Rating |
|---|---|
| USA Today | 2/4 stars |
| The Encyclopedia of Popular Music | 2/5 stars |

Brian Mansfield with USA Today gave a mixed review, saying that "Parton apparently saved up all the glitz she left off her recent bluegrass albums for this patriotic collection." He went on to say "the album comes off as her personal USO revue." He concluded by saying that "the album contains enough moving performances to erase any doubts about the sincerity of Parton's intent."

AllMusic's review of the album noted that "after recently recording countrified versions of songs like "Stairway to Heaven", Parton delivers these patriotic songs in a completely straightforward fashion. Other than the inherent twang of her pristine voice, there's little country flavor." The review went on to praise the original songs, saying, "The flag-wavers that fell from Parton's own pen, however, can't help but display the country legend's musical roots, and it's these that are the ultimate standouts."

== Commercial performance ==
For God and Country peaked at number 23 on the Billboard Top Country Albums chart and number 167 on the Billboard 200. It also peaked at number 6 on the Billboard Independent Albums chart.

The album has sold 87,000 copies in the United States as of October 2005.

== Track listing ==
| No. | Title | Writer(s) | Length |
|---|---|---|---|
| 1. | "The Lord Is My Shepherd" | Traditional | 2:09 |
| 2. | "The Star-Spangled Banner" | Francis Scott Key | 3:03 |
| 3. | "God Bless the USA" | Lee Greenwood | 3:34 |
| 4. | "Light of a Clear Blue Morning" | Dolly Parton | 4:50 |
| 5. | "When Johnny Comes Marching Home" | Louis Lambert | 4:19 |
| 6. | "Welcome Home" | Parton | 4:20 |
| 7. | "Gee, Ma, I Wanna Go Home" | Traditional | 5:19 |
| 8. | "Whispering Hope" | Jim Reeves | 2:30 |
| 9. | "There Will Be Peace In The Valley For Me" | Thomas A. Dorsey | 4:09 |
| 10. | "Red, White, And Bluegrass" | Parton | 4:24 |
| 11. | "My Country 'Tis" | Samuel Francis Smith | 2:50 |
| 12. | "I'm Gonna Miss You" | Parton | 4:59 |
| 13. | "Go To Hell" | Parton | 6:49 |
| 14. | "The Ballad of the Green Berets" | Barry A. Sadler; Robert L. Moore Jr. | 5:13 |
| 15. | "Brave Little Soldier" | Parton | 4:25 |
| 16. | "Tie A Yellow Ribbon" | Russell Brown; Irwin Levine | 3:21 |
| 17. | "Color Me America" | Parton | 3:54 |
| 18. | "The Glory Forever" | Traditional | 1:58 |
| Total length: | | | 72:06 |

== Personnel ==
Adapted from the album liner notes.

- Chuck Ainlay – recording, digital editing, mixing
- Monty Allen – background vocals
- Charlie Anderson – bass guitar
- Bob Bailey – background vocals
- Don Bailey – design, photo montages
- Robért Behar – wardrobe
- Jesse Benfield – digital editing, mixing assistant
- Dennis Carney – photography
- Dallas Christian Sound – additional vocals ("Whispering Hope")
- Gary "Biscuit" Davis – banjo
- Michael Davis – piano, Hammond B-3, synth, programming location recording, digital editing
- Hannah Dennison – "Brave Little Soldier" singers director
- Richard Dennison – background vocals, vocal supervisor, production assistant
- Kyle Dickenson – production assistant
- The Fairfield Four – additional vocals ("There Will Be Peace in the Valley for Me")
- Chris Ferrara – cover design
- Aaron Flanary – location recording assistant
- John Guess – mixing
- Robert Hale – acoustic guitar, background vocals
- Vicki Hampton – background vocals
- The Harding University Concert Choir – additional vocals ("Whispering Hope")
- Erik Hellerman – digital editing
- Steven Hill – background vocals
- Paul Hollowell – piano, Hammond B-3
- Teresa Hughes – production assistant
- Russ Long – recording, digital editing
- Luellyn Latocki – additional photos
- Randy Kohrs – dobro
- Jimmy Mattingly – fiddle, mandolin
- Partrick Murphy – recording, digital editing, mixing assistant
- Louis Nunley – background vocals
- Jennifer O'Brien – background vocals
- Judy Ogle – personal assistant
- Dolly Parton – lead vocals, background vocals, producer
- Benny Quinn – mastering
- Cheryl Riddle – hair
- Dace Sinco – recording
- David Slater – background vocals
- Tony Smith – synth, programming, recording, digital editing, producer
- Billy Thomas – drums, percussion
- Jeff Thomas – digital editing
- Sheryl Thomas – background vocals
- Steve Turner – drums, percussion
- Virginia Team – art direction, additional photos
- James Waddell – digital editing
- Bruce Watkins – acoustic guitar
- Jay Weaver – bass guitar
- Darrell Webb – mandolin, background vocals
- Kent Wells – acoustic guitar, electric guitar, background vocals, producer
- Lynn Wright – background vocals

== Charts ==
| Chart (2003) | Peak position |
|---|---|
| US Billboard 200 | 167 |
| US Top Country Albums (Billboard) | 23 |
| US Independent Albums (Billboard) | 6 |
