= The Vintage Tour =

2005 concert tour by Dolly Parton

- Tour by Dolly Parton
- Promotional poster for tour
- Associated album: Those Were the Days
- Start date: August 16, 2005
- End date: December 16, 2005
- Legs: 1
- No. of shows: 42 in North America

Dolly Parton concert chronology
- Hello, I'm Dolly Tour (2004); The Vintage Tour (2005); An Evening with Dolly Parton (2006–2007)

The Vintage Tour was Dolly Parton's 2005 concert tour to promote the release of her covers album, Those Were the Days. The tour kicked off on August 16 in Atlantic City, New Jersey and ran until December 16 in North Myrtle Beach, South Carolina.

== History ==
It surprised many fans when, towards the end of 2005, Parton announced that she had put together a brand new stage show in support of her new album Those Were the Days, which would be released mid-tour. She had previously stated in late 2004 that she'd let her band go and instead of touring, she was focusing on writing the score to the 9 to 5 musical. But now she said:

"Well, I'm at it again. I'm very excited about the new Vintage Tour. I will be featuring vintage songs of my own (the songs I'm most known for) in addition to many of your old favorites from the past that I have recorded for a new album that is due out in the early fall. It's going to be lots of fun and bring back lots of memories, so come on out and be a part of it."

The October 2, 2005, Vintage show in San Francisco's Golden Gate Park was part of the free Hardly Strictly Bluegrass festival. The San Francisco Chronicle reported afterwards that an estimated 200,000 people had attended Dolly's performance.

== Set list ==
The following set list is representative of the August 16, 2005 show in Atlantic City, New Jersey . It is not representative of all concerts for the duration of the tour.

1. "Those Were the Days"
2. "9 to 5"
3. "Jolene"
4. "Crimson and Clover"
5. "Me and Bobby McGee"
6. "My Tennessee Mountain Home"
7. "Coat of Many Colors"
8. "Smoky Mountain Memories"
9. "Marry Me" / "Applejack"
10. "Little Sparrow"
11. "Here You Come Again"
12. "Two Doors Down"
13. "PMS Blues"
14. "If I Were a Carpenter"
15. "Turn, Turn, Turn"
16. "Blowin' in the Wind"
17. "Imagine"
18. "I Will Always Love You"

Encore

19. "Hello God" / "He's Alive"

Notes:

- "Where Do the Children Play?", "Where Have All the Flowers Gone?", "These Old Bones", and "Hard Candy Christmas" were performed on select dates.

== Tour dates ==
Date	City	Country	Venue
North America
August 16, 2005	Atlantic City	United States	House of Blues
August 18, 2005	New York City	United States	Radio City Music Hall
August 19, 2005	Uncasville	United States	Mohegan Sun Arena
August 20, 2005	Philadelphia	United States	Mann Center for the Performing Arts
August 23, 2005	Washington, D.C.	United States	DAR Constitution Hall
August 25, 2005	Portland	United States	Cumberland County Civic Center
August 27, 2005	Halifax	Canada	Halifax Metro Centre
August 28, 2005	Saint John	Canada	Harbour Station
August 31, 2005	Ottawa	Canada	Corel Centre
September 1, 2005	Toronto	Canada	Molson Amphitheatre
September 24, 2005 (Note: Part of a benefit concert for Dolly Parton's Imagination Library)	Pigeon Forge	United States	Celebrity Theatre
September 25, 2005	Pigeon Forge	United States	Celebrity Theatre
September 30, 2005	Los Angeles	United States	Gibson Amphitheatre
October 1, 2005	Las Vegas	United States	House of Blues
October 2, 2005 (Note: Part of Hardly Strictly Bluegrass.)	San Francisco	United States	Speedway Meadow
October 4, 2005	Santa Rosa	United States	Wells Fargo Center for the Arts
October 6, 2005	Denver	United States	The Lecture Hall
October 25, 2005 (Note: Originally scheduled for September 17.)	Danville	United States	Norton Center for the Arts
October 27, 2005	Detroit	United States	Fox Theatre
October 28, 2005	Chicago	United States	Chicago Theatre
October 29, 2005	Madison	United States	Veterans Memorial Coliseum
October 30, 2005	Milwaukee	United States	Milwaukee Theatre
November 1, 2005	Evansville	United States	Roberts Municipal Stadium
November 2, 2005	Moline	United States	MARK of the Quad Cities
November 4, 2005	Kansas City	United States	Municipal Auditorium
November 5, 2005	Sioux City	United States	Gateway Arena
November 6, 2005	Rochester	United States	Taylor Arena
November 8, 2005	Oklahoma City	United States	Ford Center
November 9, 2005	Tulsa	United States	Mabee Center
November 25, 2005	Duluth	United States	Arena at Gwinnett Center
November 26, 2005	Orlando	United States	House of Blues
November 27, 2005	Boca Raton	United States	Count de Hoernle Amphitheater
November 28, 2005	Clearwater	United States	Ruth Eckerd Hall
December 1, 2005	Grand Prairie	United States	Nokia Live at Grand Prairie
December 2, 2005 (Note: Part of Curtain Call Gala)	Dallas	United States	Adam's Mark Hotel Ballroom
December 3, 2005 (Note: Originally scheduled for September 18.)	Birmingham	United States	Magic City Theatre
December 6, 2005	North Little Rock	United States	Alltel Arena
December 8, 2005	Tallahassee (Note: Originally scheduled for September 16.)	United States	Tallahassee-Leon County Civic Center
December 9, 2005	Charenton	United States	Cypress Bayou Bocat's
December 10, 2005	Charenton	United States	Cypress Bayou Bocat's
December 15, 2005	Charlotte	United States	Charlotte Bobcats Arena
December 16, 2005 (Note: Originally scheduled for September 15.)	North Myrtle Beach	United States	House of Blues

== Cancelled shows ==
List of cancelled concerts, showing date, city, country, venue, and reason for cancellation
Date	City	Country	Venue	Reason
December 9, 2005	New Orleans	United States	Saenger Theatre	Unknown

== Personnel ==
=== The Mighty Fine Band ===
- Band Leader, Guitar: Kent Wells
- Drums: Steve Turner
- Piano: Paul Hollowell
- Fiddle: Jay Weaver
- Dobro, Guitar: Richie Owens
- Banjo: Bruce Watkins
- Keyboard: Michael Davis
- Background vocals: Jennifer O'Brien, Vicki Hampton & Richard Dennison

=== Other staff ===
- Dolly Parton's Personal Tour Manager: Don Warden
- Tour Manager: Dave Fowler
- Production Assistant: Maryjo Spillane
- Director, Staging & Choreography: Steve Summers
- Stage Manager & Security: Danny Nozzell
- Merchandising: Ira Parker
- Production Design:Shelley and Bruce Rodgers Tribe inc
