= Halos & Horns =

Studio album by Dolly Parton
- Released: July 9, 2002
- Recorded: February 2002
- Studio: Southern Sound (Knoxville, Tennessee)
- Genres: Country; folk; bluegrass
- Length: 57:12
- Labels: Sugar Hill; Blue Eye
- Producer: Dolly Parton

Dolly Parton chronology
| Little Sparrow (2001) | Halos & Horns (2002) | Ultimate Dolly Parton (2003) |

Singles from Halos & Horns
- 1. "Dagger Through the Heart" Released: July 8, 2002; 2. "If" Released: October 7, 2002; 3. "Hello God" Released: November 11, 2002; 4. "I'm Gone" Released: February 4, 2003

Halos & Horns is the thirty-ninth solo studio album by American singer-songwriter Dolly Parton. It was released on July 9, 2002, by Sugar Hill Records and Blue Eye Records. It is the third album in Parton's critically acclaimed bluegrass trilogy, continuing her experimentation with folk and bluegrass sounds. The album was nominated for the Grammy Award for Best Country Album in 2003, while "Dagger Through the Heart" and "I'm Gone" were both nominated for Best Female Country Vocal Performance in 2003 and 2004, respectively. Parton embarked on her first tour in 10 years in support of the album. The sold-out Halos & Horns Tour played 25 shows throughout the United States and the United Kingdom. The album tracks "These Old Bones" and "Sugar Hill" were adapted into episodes of Dolly Parton's Heartstrings in 2019.

== Background ==
Following the release of her 2001 album, Little Sparrow, Parton continued to write. While writing songs at her Tennessee Mountain Home, Parton said the songs were pouring out of her by the dozens. A representative from Sugar Hill Records confirmed in late January 2002 that Parton was "writing and arranging" songs for a new album, but recording had not begun so it was unclear when the album might be released. It was confirmed in February 2002 by Dollymania that Parton had begun recording the album and that it should be released in summer 2002. Eager to begin recording the songs she had written, Parton booked a session in Knoxville, initially as a demo session. "I didn't intend to produce a record," Parton said. "I was just producing these song demos. But it started sounding so good that I was getting really excited." Parton further described the recording process by saying, "I decided I wanted to use everybody from 'up home,' or at least fresh people. There was nothing heavy or hard about it. I just went in with the pickers and we all kicked ideas around. That's how you produce great records anyway—let talented people do what they do. It's fairly 'live,' because I'm not the kind of singer who can start and stop and go back and get the same feeling. I just had a big time doing this."

== Content ==
Twelve of the album's fourteen tracks are Parton-penned originals. In addition to these twelve songs, the album features two covers: Led Zeppelin's "Stairway to Heaven" and 'Bread's "If". The album also includes new versions of two songs Parton had previously recorded. Parton first recorded "Shattered Image" for her 1976 album, All I Can Do. "What a Heartache" had originally been recorded in 1984 for the Rhinestone soundtrack album. Parton would record this song for a second time in 1991 for her Eagle When She Flies album. When asked why she would choose to re-record songs she has done before, Parton said, "I have very strong feelings about them. They've never really had a chance to be all that they can be. I have hundreds of new songs, but there are some that 'want to be done' until I find the right way."

The album opens with "Halos and Horns". Parton said she originally came up with the title about two years earlier when she was pitching a pilot to Fox that never got picked up. After she completed writing the song, Parton said she "thought it would make a good album title because it sets up the whole album being about sinners and saints." Parton said she was inspired to write the album's second track, "Sugar Hill", because "Every time I'd look at my record company's label, I'd think, 'Sugar Hill, now that's a really pretty name.' I wondered if there was a place called Sugar Hill and found out there were several. The one I courted on wasn't called Sugar Hill, but it got pretty sweet when I was up on it." The third track, "Not for Me", is a song that Parton wrote at least 35 years prior, but had never recorded. She said she found it on a tape while looking for an old song she wanted to use in the museum at Dollywood. Parton described that original demo by saying, "I thought it was a beautiful melody and I was picking the guitar before I had fingernails and I remembered that I used to play really good. I don't even remember when I wrote it. It was just a vague memory, but it must have been a time when I was feeling sad. It had to have been right when I first came to Nashville [in 1964], because there were other songs on that tape that were written before I even left home." The album's fourth track, "Hello God", was written the day after the September 11 attacks. Speaking about the track, Parton said, "I realized just how fragile we really are, and how small life is, and how everything can change in the blink of an eye. I hope everything comes across as I meant it. It's like everybody believes that God is their God. But God belongs to everybody." The fifth track is a cover of "If", which was originally recorded by Bread. Parton said she had always loved the song and wanted to record it, but wanted to do it totally different from the original arrangement. When asked why she chose to re-record the album's sixth track, "Shattered Image", Parton responded, "The reason I decided to re-do it is because of all the shit that comes out in the tabloids. It's like they punish you to death. They tell some God-awful things. Why can't people just leave you alone to live your life as you see fit? So that is why I wanted to drag this song back out, because I was feeling like that." The seventh track, "These Old Bones", tells the story of a clairvoyant mountain woman and her long-lost daughter. Speaking of her inspiration for the song, Parton said, "I was up at the Tennessee Mountain Home, writing. I was making up breakfast and thinking about this title that had come to me in a dream the night before. Then later I started making up a 'mountain' story about some old crazy woman who was psychic. 'Cause we have those "up home" all the time."

The album's eighth track, "What a Heartache", is a song that Parton had previously recorded twice. Parton said she chose to re-record it again because "I love the song too much to just let it lie there. Something in me says that somebody is going to have a big hit record on this someday." "I'm Gone", the ninth track, is a "kiss off " song. Parton said that it is loosely based on a couple that she knew who were also relatives of hers. Parton said she wrote the tenth track, "Raven Dove", at 2 o'clock in the morning. She said she was awakened by a force and felt a little inner voice tell her to get because she had to do something. She got up went to the kitchen and sat down and wrote the line "Raven of darkness, dove of peace." After that, the rest of the song came out effortlessly. Parton said the eleventh track, "Dagger Through the Heart", is one of her favorites on the album. She said she had written another song with this title, but felt it was mediocre so she re-wrote it. She went on to say she was "real proud" of how this version turned out. The album's twelfth track, "If Only", was written for a film about Mae West that Parton was working on at the time, but the song was cut from the film because the producers didn't want her singing a song this sad. The thirteenth track, "John Daniel", is another song that Parton wrote 30 to 35 years earlier. Parton said, "I've always loved the song, and I knew I wanted to use the Kingdom Heirs quartet on the album. I was thinking of songs I've written that I haven't recorded, and "John Daniel" came to mind." The album closes with a cover of the Led Zeppelin hit, "Stairway to Heaven". Speaking about her recording, Parton said, "I knew I was walking on sacred ground because it is a classic...I was scared to death to send it to Robert Plant and Jimmy Page. They sent word back that it was fine and they loved it. In fact, Robert Plant said he'd always thought of it as a spiritual song, and he was thrilled we'd used a choir on it, because he thought about that, too. If they like it, that's most important to me. But I do hope the public will accept it too. I even hope they love it."

== Release and promotion ==
The album was announced by Parton on April 6, 2002, during a press conference at the opening of Dollywood's sixteenth season. She also announced she had written songs titled "Halos and Horns" and "Hello God" for the album, which would also feature a bluegrass cover of Led Zeppelin's "Stairway to Heaven" and Bread's "If". Parton also announced plans for a summer tour.

The album's track listing was revealed on April 17.

To promote the album, Sugar Hill Records began posting on their website a short clip of a track from the album each week leading up to its release, starting with "Halos and Horns" on May 13. This was followed by "I'm Gone" on May 20, "Shattered Image" on May 29, "John Daniel" on June 2, "Not for Me" on June 10, "If Only" on June 24, and "Stairway to Heaven" on July 8. In addition to these clips, the Minneapolis-St. Paul Star Tribune previewed four songs on their website. The four songs were "Stairway to Heaven", "Not for Me", "Hello God", and "Raven Dove".

"Dagger Through the Heart" was released to radio as the first single from the album on July 8. Its music video was filmed on June 14 in Nashville, Tennessee and debuted on CMT's Most Wanted Live on July 20.

Parton appeared on NBC's Today on July 5 to promote the album. She performed "I'm Gone", "9 to 5", and "Halos and Horns".

The album was released on July 9, 2002, by Sugar Hill Records and Blue Eye Records. She promoted the album's release with an appearance on The View, performing "Halos and Horns" in addition to being interviewed. That evening, Parton made an appearance on The Late Show with David Letterman where she was interviewed and performed "Dagger Through the Heart".

Parton's cover of "If" was released as a single in Europe on October 7.

On November 6, Parton performed "Hello God" on the 36th Annual Country Music Association Awards. "Hello God" was released as the album's third single the following week. The CMA Awards performance served as the song's music video.

The album's fourth and final single, "I'm Gone", was released in February 2003. Its music video was premiered by Great American Country on June 6.

== Critical reception ==
Professional ratings
Aggregate scores
| Source | Rating |
|---|---|
| Metacritic | 73/100 |
Review scores
| Source | Rating |
| AllMusic | 3/5 stars |
| E! Online | A− |
| The Encyclopedia of Popular Music | 4/5 stars |
| Entertainment Weekly | A− |
| New York Post | 3/4 stars |

Halos & Horns was well received by critics, although not as well as its predecessor, Little Sparrow. At Metacritic, which assigns a normalized rating out of 100 to reviews from mainstream critics, the album received an average score of 73, which indicates "generally favorable reviews", based on 13 reviews. Writing for Entertainment Weekly, Holly George-Warren gave the album an A−, saying that "as the title implies" the album "comprises opposites" and Parton "pulls it off, magnificently, thanks to her spectacular trill of a soprano and earnest approach, including gospel singers and bluegrass' finest." Also giving the album an A− rating, E! Online called the album "pick-perfect bluegrass, folk and country." The review named "Sugar Hill", and "These Old Bones" as the standout Parton compositions, while calling Parton's cover of "Stairway to Heaven" "a touching and worthy remake." In a positive review for Billboard, Ray Waddell said that Parton is "making some of the absolute best, boldest music of her career." He concluded by saying that the album "fully explores the dichotomy its title hints at, but more than that, this is a showcase of a hugely important American artist at full power." In a review for Rolling Stone, Steve Knopper said that the album "showcase[s] Parton's skills as an interpreter." A positive review for Mojo said that Parton is "still producing songs that stand comparison with those past and purloined classics." Uncut gave a mixed review of the album, but still felt that it was "some of her best singing in years." Giving the album three out of five stars, Hal Horowitz of AllMusic called the album "stirring, unpretentious yet powerful," saying that it "effectively continues Parton's glorifying of her mountain roots."

== Commercial performance ==
The album debuted and peaked at number 58 on the Billboard 200 and number four on the Billboard Top Country Albums chart, selling 18,500 copies in its first week of release. At the time, it was her highest-charting album on the Top Country Albums chart since Slow Dancing with the Moon (1993) and Trio II (1999), both of which also peaked at number four. It was also her highest-charting album on the Billboard 200 since Something Special (1995) peaked at number 54. Halos & Horns peaked at number one in the UK on the OCC's UK Country Albums chart, becoming Parton's second album top the chart. The album has sold 187,000 copies in the United States as of December 2003.

"Dagger Through the Heart" was released as the album's first single in July 2002 and failed to chart. Parton's cover of Bread's "If" was released as a single in Europe in October 2002 and peaked at number 73 on the UK Singles Chart. The album's third single, "Hello God", was released in November 2002 and peaked at number 60 on the Billboard Hot Country Singles & Tracks chart. "I'm Gone" was released as the album's fourth and final single in February 2003 and failed to chart.

== Track listing ==
All tracks are written by Dolly Parton, except as noted.

| No. | Title | Writer(s) | Length |
|---|---|---|---|
| 1. | "Halos and Horns" | | 3:33 |
| 2. | "Sugar Hill" | | 2:50 |
| 3. | "Not for Me" | | 3:20 |
| 4. | "Hello God" | | 2:59 |
| 5. | "If" | David Gates | 3:19 |
| 6. | "Shattered Image" | | 3:29 |
| 7. | "These Old Bones" | | 5:37 |
| 8. | "What a Heartache" | | 4:17 |
| 9. | "I'm Gone" | | 5:07 |
| 10. | "Raven Dove" | | 3:35 |
| 11. | "Dagger Through the Heart" | | 3:52 |
| 12. | "If Only" | | 3:40 |
| 13. | "John Daniel" | | 5:03 |
| 14. | "Stairway to Heaven" | Jimmy Page; Robert Plant | 6:31 |
| Total length: | | | 57:12 |

== Personnel ==
Adapted from the album liner notes.

- Eric Bennett – background vocals
- Bob Carlin – clawhammer banjo
- Gary "Biscuit" Davis – banjo, acoustic guitar
- Richard Dennison – piano, background vocals
- Terry Eldridge – bass guitar, upright bass, background vocals
- Steve French – background vocals
- Robert Hale – acoustic guitar, background vocals
- Vicki Hampton – background vocals
- Randy Kohrs – dobro, resonator guitar, background vocals
- Jimmy Mattingly – fiddle, mandolin, viola
- Jennifer O'Brien – background vocals
- Dolly Parton – lead vocals, background vocals
- April Stevens – background vocals
- Beth Stevens – background vocals
- David Sutton – harmonica, background vocals
- Brent Truitt – mandolin
- Steve Turner – drums, snare drum, tambourine, washboard
- Darrell Webb – mandolin, background vocals
- Kent Wells – acoustic guitar, baritone guitar, electric guitar

== Charts ==
=== Weekly charts ===
| Chart (2002) | Peak position |
|---|---|
| Australian Albums (ARIA) | 192 |
| Australian Country Albums (ARIA) | 13 |
| Irish Albums (IRMA) | 51 |
| Scottish Albums (Official Charts) | 36 |
| UK Albums (Official Charts) | 37 |
| UK Country Albums (Official Charts) | 1 |
| UK Independent Albums (Official Charts) | 11 |
| US Billboard 200 | 58 |
| US Top Country Albums (Billboard) | 4 |
| US Top Bluegrass Albums (Billboard) | 2 |

=== Year-end charts ===
| Chart (2002) | Position |
|---|---|
| US Top Country Albums (Billboard) | 63 |
