= Little Sparrow =

Studio album by Dolly Parton
- Released: January 23, 2001
- Recorded: 2000
- Studios: Ocean Way (Nashville); The Doghouse (Nashville); Schnee Studio (Los Angeles)
- Genre: Bluegrass
- Length: 52:41
- Labels: Sugar Hill; Blue Eye
- Producer: Steve Buckingham

Dolly Parton chronology
The Grass Is Blue (1999)	Little Sparrow (2001)	Halos & Horns (2002)

Singles from Little Sparrow
- 1. "A Tender Lie" Released: April 2, 2001; 2. "Bluer Pastures" Released: April 2, 2001; 3. "Seven Bridges Road" Released: April 2, 2001; 4. "Shine" Released: July 9, 2001

Little Sparrow is the thirty-eighth solo studio album by American singer-songwriter Dolly Parton. It was released on January 23, 2001, by Sugar Hill and Blue Eye Records. The album received a Grammy nomination for Best Bluegrass Album and "Shine" won Best Female Country Vocal Performance. The album is dedicated to Parton's father, Lee Parton, who died in November 2000.

== Content ==
While the album's predecessor, The Grass Is Blue, featured straightforward bluegrass, Little Sparrow features a blend of Appalachian folk, bluegrass and country gospel styles. Each of the musical styles is a notable part of the culture from Parton's East Tennessee upbringing. In addition to a number of traditional songs and Parton's own compositions, the album features a reworking of the Collective Soul hit, "Shine", and the Restless Heart hit, "A Tender Lie", as well as a bluegrass version of Cole Porter's "I Get a Kick Out of You". Among the backing musicians were members of the alternative bluegrass band Nickel Creek, Alison Krauss, and members of Irish folk music band Altan.

Parton had previously recorded three of the tracks featured on the album. "Down from Dover" had originally been recorded by Parton in 1969 and included on her 1970 album, The Fairest of Them All. "My Blue Tears" was originally recorded in 1971 and included on Parton's Coat of Many Colors album. Parton also recorded the song with Emmylou Harris and Linda Ronstadt in 1978 for an ill-fated Trio project. This recording would eventually surface on Ronstadt's 1982 album, Get Closer. Parton originally recorded a solo version of "In the Sweet By-and-By" for her 1999 album, Precious Memories.

== Release and promotion ==
The album was announced by Sugar Hill Records on December 6, 2000. In a press release, Parton said,

I believe Little Sparrow has more depth, breadth, and soul than all of the other albums I have done. Hopefully it captures the best of everything I've ever lived or felt, written or sung. I also think this is Steve Buckingham's best work as a producer. I hope you enjoy it. You know how every parent thinks their kids are the prettiest, how every person thinks their hometown and their home team is the best and how every singer/songwriter thinks that the album they just finished is the best they've ever done . . . well, I think that too.

On the day of the album's release Parton appeared on NBC's Today. She appeared on the Late Show with David Letterman on January 29, performing "Shine". She also made an appearance on Late Night with Conan O'Brien on February 1, where she performed "A Tender Lie" and "I Will Always Love You". On February 27, Parton was interviewed and performed "Little Sparrow" on theTonight Show with Jay Leno.

Parton also made television appearances in Europe. She appeared on Parkinson on February 17 and So Graham Norton on February 23, where she performed "Marry Me".

== Critical reception ==
Professional ratings
Aggregate scores
Source	Rating
Metacritic	86/100
Review scores
Source	Rating
AllMusic	4/5 stars
The Encyclopedia of Popular Music	4/5 stars
Entertainment Weekly	A

Upon its release, Little Sparrow received widespread acclaim from music critics. At Metacritic, which assigns a normalized rating out of 100 to reviews from mainstream critics, the album received an average score of 86, which indicates "universal acclaim", based on 10 reviews. The review published in the January 27, 2001 issue of Billboard said, "Recognizing that mainstream country radio is pretty much off limits, Dolly Parton has wisely followed her muse of late rather than try to gauge commercialism, and God bless her for it. Little Sparrow is among Parton's best work ever, a stellar collection that peels the paint off the walls. Parton's voice remains a thing of wonder, whether it's on the haunting Smoky Mountains soul of the title cut, the aching "My Blue Tears", or the backwoods waltz "Bluer Pastures". "Mountain Angel" is spooky, "Marry Me" is a hoot, and both pay homage to the singer's mountain roots. Parton is still writing killer songs (half the 14 cuts), and the covers are lightning in a jug, including rousing takes on Collective Soul's "Shine", the Eagles' "Seven Bridges Road", and Cole Porter's "I Get a Kick Out of You". Production is of the back-porch variety, with bluegrass instrumentation mostly carrying the load. The pickers are top shelf, the harmonies are to die for, and Dolly rules. An instant classic."

Rolling Stone gave a positive review of the album and said, "Throughout Little Sparrow, Parton’s silvery, force-of-nature voice cuts to the heart of the matter, convincingly making the case that — famous literary dictum aside — you can go home again." Writing for PopMatters, Charlotte Robinson gave a positive review, saying that the album "contains some of the most beautiful and affecting music Parton has ever made, and the fact that she is doing it in her fifth decade makes it all the more dazzling an achievement." Alanna Nash of Entertainment Weekly gave the album an A and said the album "proves a sequel can surpass the original." Barry Weber of AllMusic gave the album 4 out of 5 stars and said that the album's title track is "an ingenious metaphor that, along with a slow, aching melody, and a flawless production and performance, helps round out what is truly one of the best songs Dolly Parton has written in years."

== Commercial performance ==
The album peaked at No. 12 on the US Billboard Top Country Albums chart, No. 97 on the US Billboard 200 chart, No. 12 on the US Billboard Bluegrass Albums chart and No. 3 on the US Billboard Independent Albums chart. In the UK the album peaked at No. 1 on the OCC Country Albums Chart and No. 30 on the OCC Albums Chart. The album peaked at No. 27 in Sweden No. 39 in Denmark. The album was certified Silver by the British Phonographic Industry in April 2001. As of December 2003 the album has sold 212,000 copies in the United States.

In April 2001, "A Tender Lie", "Bluer Pastures", and "Seven Bridges Road" were released as singles simultaneously to country, bluegrass, and Americana radio stations, respectively. None of them received enough airplay to chart. "Shine" was released as the fourth and final single in July 2001. Its music video premiered June 13 on CMT Most Wanted Live.

== Accolades ==
At the 44th Annual Grammy Awards the album was nominated for Best Bluegrass Album and "Shine" won Best Female Vocal Performance. The "Shine" music video was nominated for Female Video of the Year at the 2002 CMT Music Awards.

== Track listing ==
No.	Title	Writer(s)	Length
1.	"Little Sparrow"	Dolly Parton	4:14
2.	"Shine"	Ed Roland	5:11
3.	"I Don't Believe You've Met My Baby"	Autry Inman	3:02
4.	"My Blue Tears"	Parton	3:03
5.	"Seven Bridges Road"	Steve Young	3:29
6.	"Bluer Pastures"	Parton	4:10
7.	"A Tender Lie"	Randy Sharp	3:44
8.	"I Get a Kick Out of You"	Cole Porter	2:31
9.	"Mountain Angel"	Parton	6:51
10.	"Marry Me"	Parton	3:18
11.	"Down from Dover"	Parton	5:09
12.	"The Beautiful Lie"	David "Butch" McDade	2:34
13.	"In the Sweet By and By" (with Mairéad Ní Mhaonaigh of Altan)	S. Fillmore Bennett; Joseph Webster; Proinsias Ó Maonaigh (Irish verse translation)	3:54
14.	"Little Sparrow" (Reprise)	Parton	1:37
Total length:			52:41

== Personnel ==
Adapted from the album liner notes.

- Greg Allen – musician photos
- Monty Allen – drones
- Barry Bales – bass
- James Bauer – assistant engineer
- David Blair – hair
- Becky Isaacs Bowman – harmony vocals
- David Bryant – assistant engineer
- Steve Buckingham – producer, autoharp, dulcimer
- Candy Burton – makeup
- Dermot Byrne – accordion
- Marcia Campbell – clog dancer
- Neal Cappellino – additional engineering, digital editing
- Jennie Carey – production assistant
- Ciaran Curran – bouzouki
- Chip Davis – drones
- Richard Dennison – drones
- Jerry Douglas – dobro
- Stuart Duncan – fiddle
- Koji Egawa – assistant engineer
- Barry Etris – Little Sparrow illustration
- Good & Evil Design – album design
- Robert Hadley – mastering
- Terry Herd – musician photos
- Jim Herrington – photography
- Peyton Hoge – musician photos
- Rebecca Lynn Howard – harmony vocals
- Byron House – bass
- Sonya Isaacs – harmony vocals
- Carl Jackson – bass vocals, harmony vocals
- Thomas Johnson – assistant engineer
- Mark Kelly – guitar
- Alison Krauss – harmony vocals
- Kimberly Levitan – art direction
- Keith Little – harmony vocals
- Claire Lynch – harmony vocals
- Pat McInerney – percussion
- Jim Mills – banjo
- John Mock – harmonium, whistle
- Marshall Morgan – assistant engineer
- Mairéad Ní Mhaonaigh – Irish verse ("In the Sweet By and By")
- Maura O'Connell – harmony vocals
- Proinsias O'Maonaigh – Irish verse translation ("In the Sweet By and By")
- Gary Paczosa – recording, mixing, musician photos
- Dolly Parton – lead vocals, harmony vocals
- Bubba Richardson – clog dancer
- Doug Sax – mastering
- Mike Snider – clawhammer banjo
- Daithi Sproule – guitar
- Bryan Sutton – guitar
- Chris Thile – mandolin
- Ciaran Tourish – whistle, low whistle
- Dan Tyminski – harmony vocals
- Darrin Vincent – harmony vocals
- Rhonda Vincent – harmony vocals
- Sara Watkins - fiddle
- Sean Watkins - guitar
- Mary E. Yeomans – musician photos

== Charts ==
=== Weekly charts ===
Chart (2001)	Peak position
Australian Albums (ARIA)	136
Australian Country Albums (ARIA)	9
Danish Albums (Hitlisten)	39
Scottish Albums (Official Charts)	19
Swedish Albums (Sverigetopplistan)	27
UK Albums (Official Charts)	30
UK Country Albums (Official Charts)	1
UK Independent Albums (Official Charts)	4
US Billboard 200	97
US Independent Albums (Billboard)	3
US Top Bluegrass Albums (Billboard)	12
US Top Country Albums (Billboard)	12

=== Year-end charts ===
Chart (2001)	Position
US Top Country Albums (Billboard)	49

== Certifications ==
Region	Certification	Certified units/sales
United Kingdom (BPI)	Silver	60,000^{^}
^{^} Shipments figures based on certification alone.

== Release history ==
Region	Date	Format	Label	Ref.
Various	January 23, 2001	CD; cassette	Sugar Hill; Blue Eye	
