= Better Get to Livin' =

Single by Dolly Parton

from the album Backwoods Barbie
- Released: August 28, 2007
- Genre: Country pop
- Length: 3:33
- Label: Dolly
- Songwriters: Dolly Parton; Kent Wells
- Producers: Dolly Parton; Kent Wells

Dolly Parton singles chronology
| "Travelin' Thru" (2006) | "Better Get to Livin'" (2007) | "Jesus & Gravity" (2008) |

Music video
- "Better Get to Livin'" on YouTube

"Better Get to Livin'" is a song by American singer-songwriter Dolly Parton. It was released on August 28, 2007, exclusively to the iTunes Store as the first release by Parton's own record label, Dolly Records. The song was subsequently sent to country radio on September 28 as the first single from Parton's 2008 album, Backwoods Barbie. An upbeat country pop song, its lyrics deal with keeping a positive attitude and overcoming negative emotions. The song garnered positive reviews from critics and reached number 48 on the Billboard Hot Country Songs chart. The music video featuring Parton and Amy Sedaris premiered November 26.

== Background and writing ==
The idea for the song came from Parton's co-producer and band leader Kent Wells, who co-wrote the song with her. According to Parton, Wells suggested that she write a song about her attitude since so many people ask what the secret to her happiness is. According to Parton, the song is about coping with the pressures of life and trying to keep a positive outlook in the midst of difficult times:

"I think life has always been a pressure cooker. People react to whatever pressures they’re under at the time according to their tolerance level and their mental attitude. Certainly with so much attention today on being skinny and beautiful, rich and famous, equal pay for equal work, getting ahead, raising kids, holding down a job, getting older, etc., well I think this song says some things to let people know they’re not the only ones in that fix. And this song offers some advice for a way out."

Parton recruited acclaimed gospel singers Sonya Isaacs and Rebecca Isaacs Bowman to provide backing vocals for the song.

== Reception ==
Critics gave the song positive reviews. Jac Chebatoris of Newsweek considered it "the CD's standout tune", and remarked that Parton's voice on the track is "still powerful and clear after all these years." Allmusic was somewhat less enthusiastic, deeming the song "cloyingly wise", but "catchy enough". Chris Jones, writing for the BBC's online service, remarked on the song's feminist undertones, characterizing it as "a strident ode to the lessons that Parton's learned in a lifetime spent in an arena where men most definitely are men and women are expected to be grateful."

== Music video ==
Parton explains the importance of keeping a good attitude.

The music video for "Better Get to Livin'" is set in a carnival, filmed on location at a farm in Pigeon Forge, Tennessee. The video begins with Parton putting on her make-up while a hawker, played by Amy Sedaris, tells everyone to gather around. Parton comes out and begins singing to the depressed women in the audience. The next segment has Parton comforting a friend in the kitchen of her house. The video then returns to the carnival where Parton is running a projector showing an old-fashioned silent movie. In the movie, a fortune-teller (also played by Sedaris) is telling Parton's friend all the things that are wrong with her life. Parton then sings to the women in the audience about how to cope with their problems by keeping a good attitude. At the end, everyone leaves the carnival with their spirits lifted.

The video had a largely positive reception. Allison Stewart of The Washington Post praised Sedaris' performance in the video and deemed the rest of the video "pretty awesome" as well. Whitney Self, writing for CMT.com, described the video as "an over-the-top colorful piece" done "in usual Dolly fashion". According to the video's director, Steven Lippman, the video was viewed over 170,000 times on YouTube prior to the release of the Backwoods Barbie album.

== Chart performance ==
"Better Get to Livin'" was released to radio on September 28, 2007, and peaked at number 48 on the Billboard Hot Country Songs chart. The song was Parton's first charting solo single since "Hello God" in 2002.

| Chart (2007–08) | Peak position |
|---|---|
| US Hot Country Songs (Billboard) | 48 |

== Notable performances ==
In September 2007, Parton gave the first public performance of "Better Get to Livin'" on the television program Dancing with the Stars, with an estimated audience of 20 million viewers. Later that year, Parton performed the song while leading the Macy's Thanksgiving Day Parade in New York City.
