= Moscow Circus (band) =

Post punk band formed in Long Eaton, Derbyshire, England

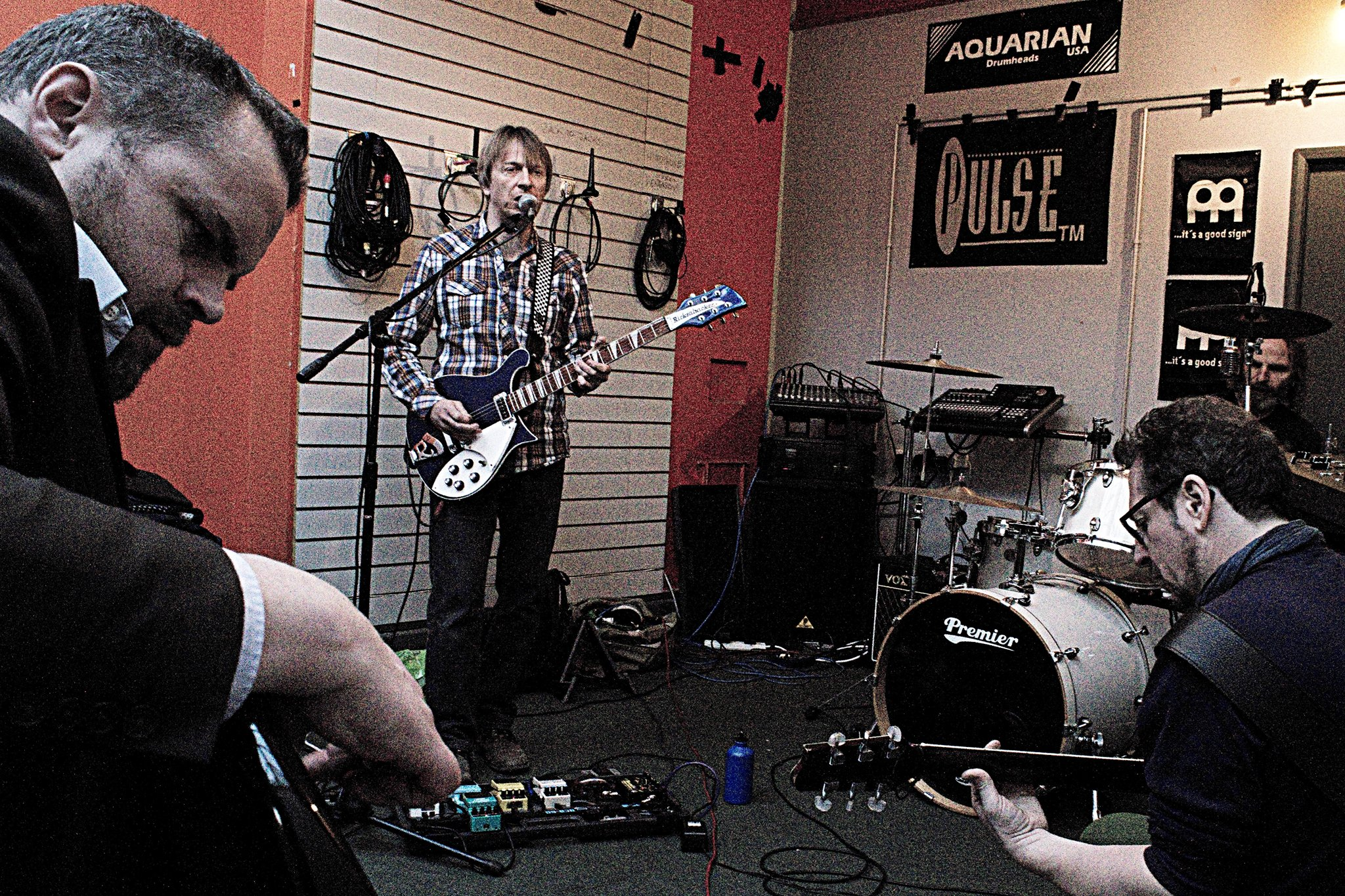
- Moscow Circus rehearsal in 2016, left to right: Pete Temperton, Jonathan Beckett, Tom Parratt, Mark Paulson.

Background information
- Also known as: Critical Hippo (1987-1988); Stigmata (1988-1989); Bloodsugar (1990-1991)
- Origin: Long Eaton, Derbyshire, U.K.
- Genres: Post-Punk; Indie, Folk-Rock
- Years active: 1987-1989; 1990-1991; 2007–present
- Label: Echolocation Records
- Members: Jonathan Beckett; Tom Parratt; Peter Temperton; Mark Paulson; Andrew Mainman (currently a touring member)
- Past members: Martin Haddelsey
- Website: www.moscowcircus.co.uk

Moscow Circus is a post-punk band formed in Long Eaton, Derbyshire in December 1987. The band currently comprises songwriter, guitarist, keyboardist, and vocalist, Jonathan Beckett, Tom Parratt on drums and backing vocals, Pete Temperton on bass Mark Paulson on guitar, and bassist Andrew Mainman who covers for Temperton when he is unavailable. After over 25 years since the band formed, they released their debut album Resounding in May 2016 on Echolocation Records.

== History ==
=== Early years (1987–1989) ===
Prior to the formation of Moscow Circus, in 1986, Tom Parratt and Jonathan Beckett formed a cover band called Out of Order who performed tracks by artists including David Bowie and OMD. Following the disbandment in 1987, Parratt and Beckett created a band called Great Big Word. This was the first band where the two of them played original songs together. The band produced one album together entitled Great Big Word! before splitting up in late 1987. During Beckett's time in Great Big Word, he acquired his first guitar which was a Shergold Activator, after the bassist Rod Tippett pointed it out to him whilst they were shopping.

In December 1987, Moscow Circus (originally called Critical Hippo) was formed by Beckett, Parratt, and Pete Temperton, who, prior to forming the band, had never played bass before, but had some musical background with woodwind and brass instruments; in order to play, the band borrowed a Westone Thunder 1A bass guitar from a friend. Later, in 1988, Temperton purchased his own bass, which was a Marlin Sidewinder.

At first the band rehearsed at home but after frequent complaints from their neighbours; they moved to the local community centre which they could rent for £5.00. But they prioritized buying records from Selectadisc - a music store in Nottingham, and going to the pub over this practice. Three weeks after forming the band, the band performed their debut gig at The Garage in Nottingham in January 1988, supporting The Legendary Dolphins.

The band then changed their name to Moscow Circus, then to Stigmata, and, in May 1988, the trio moved into a shared house in Dunkirk, Nottingham, and did several more gigs around the city before disbanding in 1989.

=== Bloodsugar (1990–1991) ===
The band reformed as Bloodsugar in August 1990, it was at this time that Martin Haddelsey was added to the trio. The band recorded demos of various songs on Pete Temperton's 4-track tape recorder; once a week, the band would come together to record the parts - with the drums being recorded at their place of rehearsal, and the guitars, vocals, and keyboards being recorded at Tom Parratt's house. The group continued to perform around various Nottingham venues before splitting up again in 1991.

After the split, Jonathan Beckett penned the song 'Snapshot', and him and Temperton demoed it, this was the youngest song that featured on their later album: Resounding. Whilst Beckett would work with both Temperton and Parratt on various other musical endeavors, the original lineup wouldn't come back together again for over fifteen years.

=== A Parallel Derbyshire (2007-2011) ===
In late 2007, Jonathan Beckett had the idea of bringing the band back together in celebration of the fortieth birthdays of two of the band members, himself and Pete Temperton; as Temperton hadn't played bass since the split, Beckett was unsure at first if he would agree. The band played their first gig since 1991, under the name Moscow Circus in 2008 at The Loft. Later on that year, the band performed at Nottingham's punk and alternative music venue: Junktion 7 on Saturday 22 November, which was their birthday celebration gig. Whilst the band only intended to come back as a birthday celebration: the gigs were well received and they realized how much they missed being together.

Prior to the reunion of the band, Beckett went to university to complete his music degree, during this time he took the 4-track demos from the Bloodsugar years and made new mixes of them, then, once the band had come back together, a track list was decided and artwork produced. This album was called A Parallel Derbyshire, and it was never officially released; instead it was distributed to the friends and members of the band in 2008. Some of the recordings from this album were later made available on Myspace.

Shortly after reforming, the band received their first ever US radio play when 'Princess Rainbow' was featured on a radio show called 'The 80s Underground' on Radio KSCU, Santa Clara, California.

=== Resounding (2012–2016) ===
Between 2012 and 2013, Moscow Circus began recording their debut album Resounding at Hypermonosonic Recordings, the name was suggested by Tom Parratt. All songs on Resounding were written between 1987 and 1991; some of the songs from the 2008 demo album A Parallel Derbyshire also made an appearance on the new release, such as 'Princess Rainbow', and 'Snapshot'. The band enlisted the help from Tiago Queiroz of Thee Eviltones as a producer as Beckett liked the guitar tones he produced on the Thee Eviltones record; Queiroz also featured on the album as an additional guitarist on two of the songs. The album was fully mixed and mastered by early 2014. Beckett had hoped that Moscow Circus would have the backing of a record label, but this didn't work out. The band decided to create their own label: Echolocation Records in 2015; the album was set to be released in the same year, but was postponed until 27 May 2016 due to the fact they scrapped the cover-art. The new cover-art was produced by Jim Donnelly.

From the album, the band decided to create music videos for two of the songs, these are: 'Princess Rainbow', which was created by Caroline Abbott in 2014, and 'Timebomb', made by Phil Hadley. The music video for 'Princess Rainbow' used footage from Nottingham Green Festival, where they played the song, and various others from their album on Sunday 1 September 2013.

When Resounding was released, it was met by praise from critics. The band celebrated the release at the Old Salutation Inn album launch show; before 'My Lifetime', Beckett announced that Mark Paulson had joined the band. Following the release of the album, Moscow Circus appeared on The Smelly Flowerpot on Cambridge 105 for an interview, and to perform some of the songs. At the end of the year, backing vocalist and keyboardist Martin Haddelsey, left the band.

=== Post-Resounding (2017–present) ===
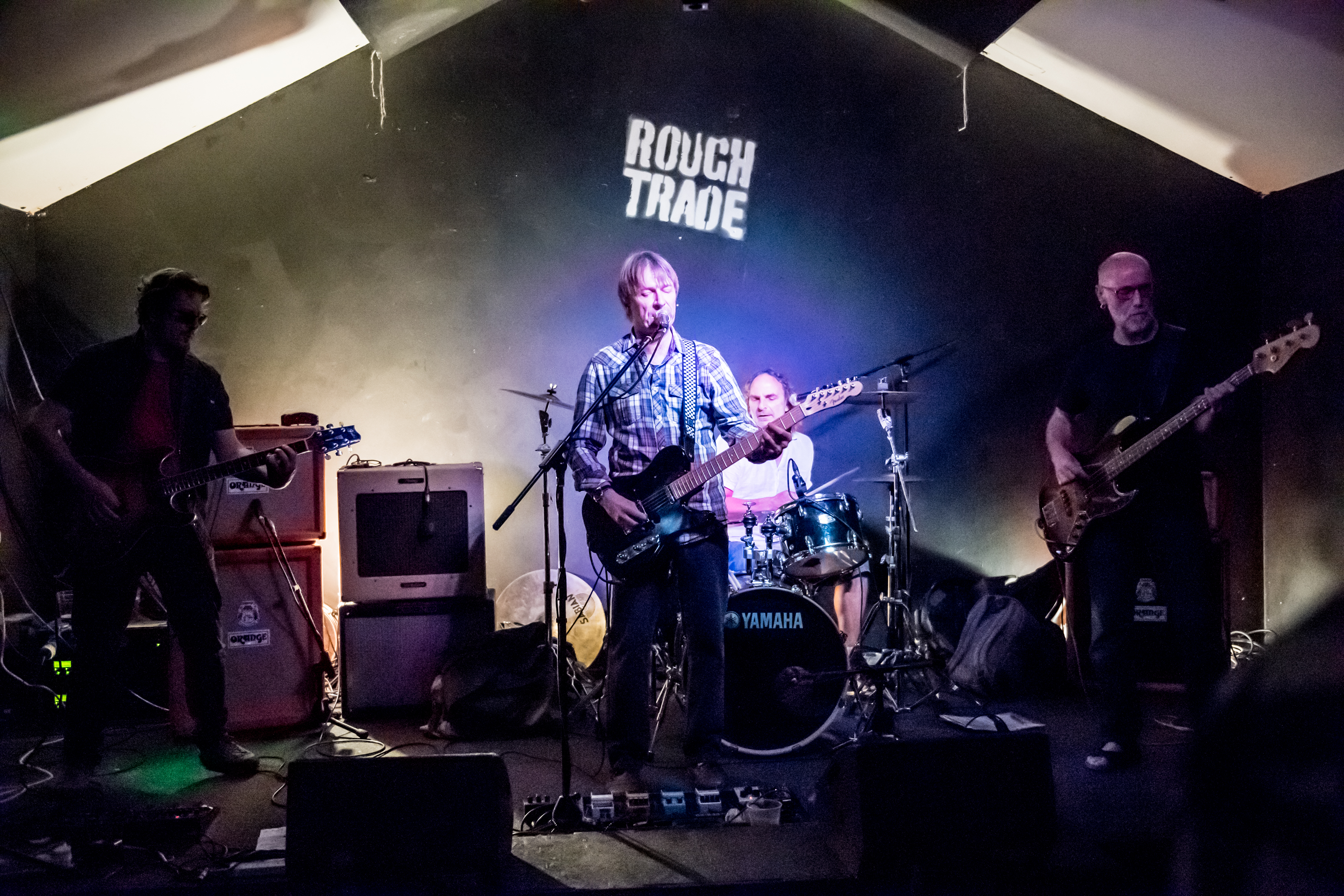
Moscow Circus pictured performing at Rough Trade in Nottingham in 2018

During the production of Resounding, three extra tracks were recorded at Hypermonosonic Recordings. These have been set to be released as a download.

The first of which, 'This Train', was officially released on 6 July 2018 on Echolocation Records, although it received its first radio play four days prior. The cover art was produced by Jim Donnelly. The release was covered by Mike Wright from Cambridge Music Reviews who stated that "Beckett [uses] various train metaphors as a platform for philosophical musings on mortality and destiny. The messages are wrapped in some surreal imagery."

'My Lifetime' then was released on 1 March 2019, the download also featured a 1990 demo version of the song.

== Musical style and influences ==
Moscow Circus' music has been described as post-punk, indie, and folk-rock. According to Kim Harten, Moscow Circus combine "indie rock and pop, psychedelia, vintage synth music, and the brooding atmospheres and emotional urgency of post-punk into a coherent whole."

The members share a lot of common ground regarding tastes in music; R.E.M. and Hüsker Dü were strong influences on 'Ex Genius'. The band also gained influence from post-punk bands such as Joy Division, Echo And The Bunnymen, Wire and Talking Heads - 'Once in a Lifetime' was the first single Jonathan Beckett purchased; as well as sixties psychedelic music, and garage punk. In an article in PennyBlackMusic, a Scottish music magazine, published on 22 December 2016, Beckett describes some of his favorite albums, these include: Talk Talk Talk by the Psychedelic Furs, Systems of Romance by Ultravox, Feline by The Stranglers; and Computer World by Kraftwerk - which he received for Christmas in 1981.

== Beckett's solo career ==
In 2004 Jonathan Beckett released the song 'She's a Vampire', written in 1998, it was released as part of a home-produced five-track EP. Beckett's music attracted the attention of Paul Simpson of The Wild Swans who stated:

"I'm a sucker for musical beauty, lyrical sadness and outsiderism, and they don't come more beautifully outsider than Jonathan Beckett. For me, stumbling upon Jonathan's music is a bit like chancing upon the ivy-covered remains of an architecturally significant stately home while out walking in the woods; a little decayed, ever so slightly scary perhaps, but beneath the ivy lie elegant mullioned windows, intricately carved stone bestiary and secret doors in the oak paneling."

Later, In June 2010, Beckett released an E.P. which shared the name of the song 'She's a Vampire'; this also featured the song 'Between Two Worlds', which was originally released in 2003 on a home-produced album named Start Point. She's a Vampire was released on the same record label that The Wild Swans were on: Occultation Recordings, as Simpson put Beckett in contact with Nick Halliwell - the owner, the E.P. was later re-released on Echolocation Records as a download. Featured on the E.P. as the bass player was Andrew Mainman, who would later become the bassist for Moscow Circus whenever Pete Temperton is unavailable. Beckett also notes in an interview for PennyBlackMusic that one of his musical heroes Will Sergeant, the guitarist of Echo and The Bunnymen, contacted him in 2010 to state that he loved 'She's a Vampire'.

In January 2012, he sang 'I Lost My Sense Of Humour At The Sacre Coeur' on the compilation album No Sleep Til Torcross, released on Vollwert Records (a small Indie label based in Berlin).

In March 2013, Beckett performed two Robyn Hitchcock songs on Dave Hammond's radio show on Cambridge 105.

== Band members ==
Current members

- Jonathan Beckett – lead vocals, guitar, keyboard (1987–present)
- Tom Parratt – drums, backing vocals (1987–present)
- Pete Temperton – bass (1987–present)
- Mark Paulson – guitar (2016–present)

Former members

- Martin Haddelsey – keyboard, backing vocals (1990–2016)

Current touring members

- Andrew Mainman – bass

Session musicians

- Tiago Queiroz – additional guitar on Resounding (2016)

== Discography ==
=== Albums ===
- A Parallel Derbyshire (2008, unreleased demo)
- Resounding (2016)

=== Singles ===
- 'Princess Rainbow' (2015)
- 'This Train' (2018)
- 'My Lifetime' (2019)

== Videography ==
- 'Princess Rainbow'
- 'Timebomb'
