= Hello, I'm Dolly Tour =

2004 concert tour by Dolly Parton

- Tour by Dolly Parton
- Start date: October 14, 2004
- End date: December 19, 2004
- Legs: 1
- No. of shows: 39 in North America

Dolly Parton concert chronology
- Halos & Horns Tour (2002); Hello, I'm Dolly Tour (2004); The Vintage Tour (2005)

The Hello, I'm Dolly Tour in 2004 was Dolly Parton's first concert tour since 2002, her first major tour in a decade, and her largest tour in two decades.

== History ==
After staging the very intimate, club-set Halos & Horns Tour in 2002, Parton returned with a venture on a much larger scale. The Hello, I'm Dolly Tour included new lighting, costumes, and included huge screens on the sides of the stage for each venue. Parton said:

"The show itself has every color of me in it, from gospel to bluegrass to country to the bigger production numbers, and to the pop hits that I've been fortunate to do through the years. I think there will be something for everybody. I wanted to do it in a big way so all of us can enjoy it. My band and I are really looking forward to this!"

The tour was originally slated to promote Blue Smoke, which was to be Parton's new album that was scheduled to include a mix of new Parton material ("I Dreamed About Elvis", "Blue Smoke") as well as new covers of older songs ("Imagine", "Me and Bobby McGee"). The album was supposed to be released after the tour was over, presumably in the beginning of the 2005. Those plans were pushed back however because of Parton's involvement with writing the score to 9 to 5: The Musical . It did eventually come to fruition, albeit becoming an album composed entirely of covers and was renamed Those Were The Days (2005).

"Blue Smoke" remains a fan favorite and was incredibly well received during these concerts. It was eventually released as the first single of her 2014 album Blue Smoke. "I Dreamed About Elvis" is a Parton-composed song that details the oft-told story that Elvis Presley wanted to record "I Will Always Love You"; those plans were never realized. It too was well received during these shows.

== The show ==
All shows were in theatre-style seating with special large-screen video presentations, wall curtains, lighting and carpeting brought in for these specific concerts. The opening act (and six out of the ten members of Dolly's backing band for her concerts) were then-new bluegrass band The Grascals.

Parton wore three different costumes throughout the tour. All basically the same style, they were white, blue, and pink. Costume changes happened on stage, by Parton using "add-ons." She added a flowing skirt for the piano numbers, a hippie skirt for the covers, and a country-style-type skirt for the "Tennessee Mountain Home" segment. For the encore, she returned wearing a flowy, accordion-sleeve robe.

She played piano on stage for the first time on "The Grass Is Blue" (and later "Brand New Key"). She had recently recorded "Baby, It's Cold Outside" with Rod Stewart for his album Stardust: The Great American Songbook, Volume III. During the show, her longtime back-up singer, and former brother-in-law, Richard Dennison filled in for Stewart with Parton climbing up on the piano with a martini glass and cigarette as a lounge torch singer. During a segment on her prior duets with Kenny Rogers, Parton operated a Rogers ventriloquist's puppet against pre-recorded dialogue by Rogers and later while singing (against pre-recorded vocals by Rogers) "Islands in the Stream". The puppet was used at only a few of the shows during the East Coast portion of the show and the song subsequently dropped from the setlist.

== Opening act ==
- The Grascals

== Set list ==
The following set list is representative of the October 14, 2004 show in Greenville, South Carolina . It is not representative of all concerts for the duration of the tour.

1. "Hello, I'm Dolly"
2. "Two Doors Down"
3. "9 to 5"
4. "Jolene" / "Why'd You Come in Here Lookin' Like That" / "Here You Come Again"
5. "The Grass Is Blue"
6. "Baby, It's Cold Outside"
7. "I Dreamed About Elvis"
8. "Viva Las Vegas"
9. "PMS Blues"
10. "Blue Smoke"
11. "Go to Hell"
12. "Me and Bobby McGee"
13. "Imagine"
14. "Islands in the Stream"
15. "My Tennessee Mountain Home"
16. "Coat of Many Colors"
17. "Smoky Mountain Memories"
18. "Thank God I'm a Country Girl"
19. "Little Sparrow"
20. "I Will Always Love You"

Encore

21. "Hello God"

=== Notes ===
- "Brand New Key", "Burnin' Love", "Welcome Home", "When Johnny Comes Marching Home", "Shine", and "Rocky Top" were performed at some shows.

== Tour dates ==
Date	City	Country	Venue
North America
October 14, 2004	Greenville	United States	Pepsi Pavilion
October 15, 2004	Atlanta	United States	Fox Theatre
October 16, 2004	Biloxi	United States	Biloxi Grand Theatre
October 17, 2004	Biloxi	United States	Biloxi Grand Theatre
October 19, 2004	Cleveland	United States	Gund Arena
October 20, 2004	Columbus	United States	Value City Arena
October 22, 2004	Rama	Canada	Casino Rama Entertainment Centre
October 23, 2004	Rama	Canada	Casino Rama Entertainment Centre
October 24, 2004	Rama	Canada	Casino Rama Entertainment Centre
October 26, 2004	Detroit	United States	Fox Theatre
October 27, 2004	Green Bay	United States	Theatre at the Resch Center
October 29, 2004	Saint Paul	United States	Theater at Xcel Energy Center
October 30, 2004	Omaha	United States	Qwest Center Arena
October 31, 2004	St. Louis	United States	The Concert Club
November 4, 2004	Raleigh	United States	Moonlight Theater
November 6, 2004	Norfolk	United States	Prism Theatre
November 7, 2004	Winston-Salem	United States	New Theatre at The Joel Coliseum
November 11, 2004	East Rutherford	United States	The Theater at CAA
November 12, 2004	Atlantic City	United States	Circus Maximus Theater
November 13, 2004	Uncasville	United States	Mohegan Sun Arena
November 14, 2004	Fairfax	United States	Patriot Center
November 17, 2004	Albany	United States	Pepsi Arena
November 18, 2004	Philadelphia	United States	Wachovia Spectrum
November 19, 2004	Wilkes-Barre	United States	Wachovia Arena at Casey Plaza
November 20, 2004	Reading	United States	Reading Eagle Theater
November 21, 2004	University Park	United States	Bryce Jordan Center
December 2, 2004 (Note: Originally scheduled to take place at Theater at the SBC Center, San Antonio.)	Austin	United States	The Theatre at the Frank Erwin Center
December 3, 2004	Dallas	United States	American Airlines Center
December 5, 2004	Houston	United States	Toyota Center
December 7, 2004	Las Vegas	United States	The Colosseum at Caesars Palace
December 8, 2004	Phoenix	United States	Dodge Theatre
December 9, 2004	Anaheim	United States	Theatre at the Arrowhead Pond
December 10, 2004	San Jose	United States	HP Pavilion at San Jose
December 11, 2004	Reno	United States	Hilton Theater
December 12, 2004	Sacramento	United States	ARCO Arena
December 16, 2004	Nampa	United States	Idaho Center
December 17, 2004	Portland	United States	Theater of the Clouds
December 18, 2004	Spokane	United States	The Star Theatre at the Spokane Arena
December 19, 2004 (Note: Originally scheduled to take place at Key Arena, Seattle on December 19.)	Everett	United States	Everett Events Center

=== Box score office data ===
Venue	City	Tickets sold / available	Gross revenue
American Airlines Center	Dallas	6,409 / 6,409	$261,225
Toyota Center	Houston	4,879 / 4,879	$228,737
The Colosseum at Caesars Palace	Las Vegas	3,979 / 3,979	$284,695
HP Pavilion at San Jose	San Jose	6,409 / 6,409	$261,225
ARCO Arena	Sacramento	5,736 / 5,736	$259,724
Idaho Center	Nampa	5,762 / 5,762	$258,853
Theater of the Clouds	Portland	5,117 / 5,117	$196,068
The Star Theatre at the Spokane Arena	Spokane	5,608 / 5,608	$210,188
Everett Events Center	Everett	4,908 / 4,908	$257,719
Total		48,807 / 48,807 (100%)	$2,218,434

== Crew ==
- Monitor Engineer: Bryan Vasquez
- System Tech: Bryan W. Baxley
- FOH Engineer: Matt Naylor
