= Galantis discography =

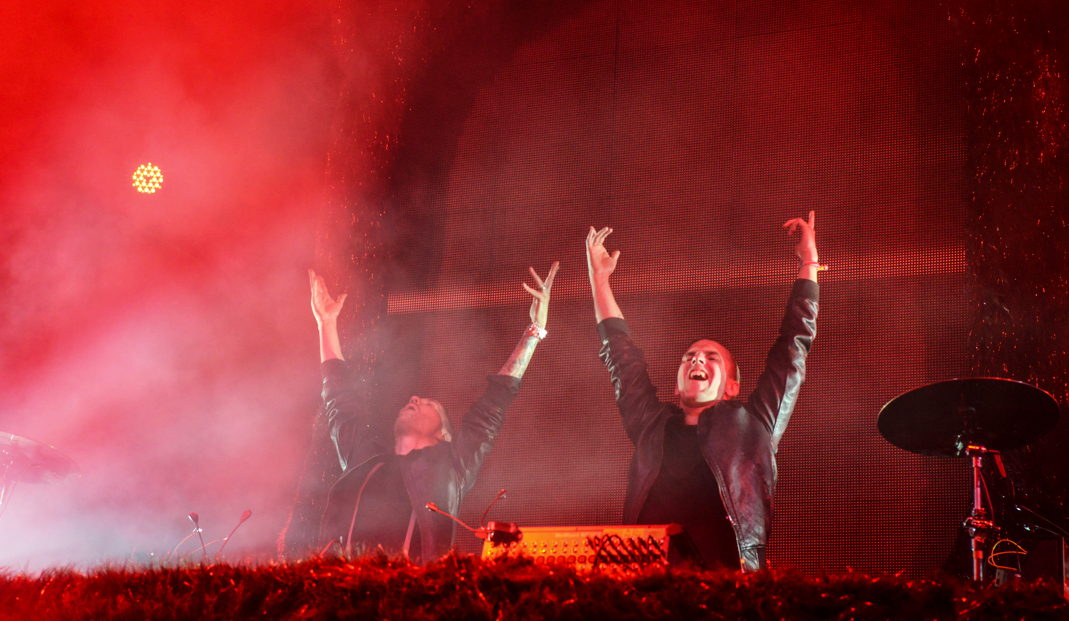
- The duo performing at the Coachella Valley Music and Arts Festival 2014.
- Studio albums: 4
- EPs: 3
- Singles: 62
- Promotional singles: 6
- Guest appearances: 2

Galantis is a Swedish electronic music production and songwriting act consisting of Christian "Bloodshy" Karlsson from Miike Snow, and formerly also Linus Eklöw aka Style of Eye. Galantis is best known for its biggest hit singles "Runaway (U & I)", "Peanut Butter Jelly" and "No Money".

The duo of Galantis initially met by chance at Karlsson's Robotberget studios in Stockholm, sometime in 2007. In 2009, Karlsson's band Miike Snow asked Eklöw, who produces and DJs as Style of Eye, to remix their song "Animal". After that, the two Swedes started hanging out in the studio together, playing each other songs and scraps of ideas.

Explaining what drew him to Eklöw, Karlsson says, "He's an amazing programmer and designer of soundscapes. It was artsy, in a way. He was different." The duo signed to Atlantic Records' dance imprint Big Beat Records in mid-2013. Recording in a studio in the Swedish archipelago in the Baltic Sea, the duo began to focus heavily on their artistic direction. They opt to combine the excitement and big energy of electronic music with meaningful songwriting.

The first composition they agreed upon was "Smile". After that, their direction became clear. "We felt the urge to fill the dance world up with songs and with songwriting. That created our sound," says Eklöw. "Smile" also marked the first instance of the "Seafox", a creature that is the brainchild of visual artist Mat Maitland. The "Seafox" is the Galantis mascot of sorts, appearing in all their videos, cover art and even their live show. In February, the duo released their second single "You". The track was subsequently played heavily at Winter Music Conference, becoming the 8th most Shazamed track at the festival.

Their debut self-titled EP Galantis was released on 1 April 2014. Galantis has had international success with their single "Runaway (U & I)", which debuted on 5 October 2014. The single is the lead single from their album Pharmacy, and reached the top 5 in Australia and the UK. It has been certified 2× Platinum in Australia, and Platinum in the UK, Norway and Sweden. Galantis released the single "Gold Dust" on 19 February 2015 through Stereogum. Galantis released their debut album Pharmacy on 8 June 2015. The album was available for pre-order on 20 April 2015. The 13-track album features the five singles "You" (from their first EP), "Runaway (U & I)", "Gold Dust", "Peanut Butter Jelly" and "In My Head". The duo uploaded each song to their YouTube channel with alternate artworks for each track.

== Studio albums ==
Title	Details	Peak chart positions										Certifications
Title	Details	SWE	AUS	BEL	CAN	NLD	NOR	NZ	UK	US	US Dance	Certifications
Pharmacy	Released: 8 June 2015; Label: Atlantic; Format: Digital download, CD	7	38	128	98	48	15	33	71	45	1	MC: Gold; RIAA: Gold; RMNZ: Gold
The Aviary	Released: 15 September 2017; Label: Atlantic; Format: Digital download, CD	—	40	—	47	—	—	—	58	102	4	MC: Gold; RMNZ: Gold
Church	Released: 7 February 2020; Label: Atlantic; Format: Digital download, CD	—	—	—	—	—	—	—	—	—	4	
Rx	Released: 17 May 2024; Label: Atlantic; Format: Digital download, CD	—	—	—	—	—	—	—	—	—	—	
"—" denotes an album that did not chart or was not released.

== Extended plays ==
Title	Details	Peak chart positions
Title	Details	US Dance
Raveheart	Released: 2012; Label: Big Beat, Atlantic; Format: Digital download	—
Galantis	Released: 1 April 2014; Label: Big Beat, Atlantic; Format: Digital download	72
The Devil's Tax Return: Volume 1	Released: 16 October 2026; Label: Counter; Format: Digital download	—
"—" denotes an album that did not chart or was not released.

== Singles ==
=== As lead artist ===
Title	Year	Peak chart positions										Certifications	Album
Title	Year	SWE	AUS	AUT	CAN	GER	NLD	NOR	NZ	UK	US	Certifications	Album
"Raveheart"	2012	—	—	—	—	—	—	—	—	—	—		Raveheart
"Smile"	2014	—	—	—	—	—	—	—	—	—	—		Galantis EP
"You"	2014	—	—	—	—	—	—	—	—	—	— (Note: "You" did not chart on the Billboard Hot 100, but peaked at number 19 on the Bubbling Under Hot 100 Singles chart.)		Galantis EP and Pharmacy
"Runaway (U & I)"	2014	25	4	39	96	58	3	12	6	4	— (Note: "Runaway (U & I)" did not chart on the Billboard Hot 100, but peaked at number 14 on the Bubbling Under Hot 100 Singles chart.)	GLF: 2× Platinum; ARIA: 2× Platinum; BPI: 2× Platinum; BVMI: Platinum; IFPI NOR: 2× Platinum; MC: 3× Platinum; RIAA: 3× Platinum; RMNZ: 3× Platinum	Pharmacy
"Gold Dust"	2015	—	—	—	—	—	—	—	—	—	—		Pharmacy
"Peanut Butter Jelly"	2015	17	3	70	—	76	81	17	18	8	—	GLF: Gold; ARIA: 3× Platinum; BPI: Platinum; IFPI NOR: Platinum; MC: Platinum; RIAA: Platinum; RMNZ: Platinum	Pharmacy
"In My Head"	2015	—	—	—	—	—	—	—	—	—	—		Pharmacy
"Louder Harder Better"	2016	—	—	—	—	—	—	—	—	—	—		Pharmacy
"No Money"	2016	4	6	9	51	10	6	1	16	4	88	ARIA: Platinum; BPI: 2× Platinum; BVMI: Platinum; IFPI AUT: Gold; MC: 2× Platinum; RIAA: 2× Platinum; RMNZ: 2× Platinum	The Aviary
"Make Me Feel" (with East & Young)	2016	— (Note: "Make Me Feel" did not enter the Swedish Singles Chart, but peaked at number nine on the Swedish Heatseeker chart.)	99	—	—	—	—	—	—	—	—		XOXO: The Album
"Love on Me" (with Hook n Sling)	2016	27	69	46	—	39	29	—	— (Note: "Love on Me" did not enter the NZ Top 40 Singles Chart, but peaked at number 10 on the NZ Heatseeker Singles Chart.)	16	—	BPI: Platinum; BVMI: Gold; MC: Platinum; RMNZ: 2× Platinum	The Aviary
"Pillow Fight"	2016	—	—	—	—	—	—	—	—	—	—		The Aviary
"Rich Boy"	2017	— (Note: "Rich Boy" did not enter the Swedish Singles Chart (Sverigetopplistan), but peaked at number 13 on the Swedish Heatseeker Singles Chart.)	—	—	—	—	—	—	—	60	—		Non-album single
"Hunter"	2017	24	—	37	—	35	68	16	— (Note: "Hunter" did not enter the NZ Top 40 Singles Chart, but peaked at number nine on the NZ Heatseeker Singles Chart.)	—	—	BVMI: Gold	The Aviary
"Tell Me You Love Me" (with Throttle)	2017	—	—	—	—	—	—	—	—	—	—	ARIA: Gold	The Aviary
"Spaceship" (featuring Uffie)	2018	92	—	—	—	—	—	—	—	—	—		Non-album single
"Satisfied" (featuring Max)	2018	85	—	—	—	—	—	—	— (Note: "Satisfied" did not enter the NZ Top 40 Singles Chart, but peaked at number 39 on the NZ Hot Singles Chart.)	—	—		Satisfied / Mama Look at Me Now
"Mama Look at Me Now"	2018	—	—	—	—	—	—	—	—	—	—		Satisfied / Mama Look at Me Now
"Emoji"	2018	—	—	—	—	—	—	—	—	—	—		Non-album singles
"San Francisco" (featuring Sofia Carson)	2018	—	—	—	—	—	—	—	—	—	—		Non-album singles
"Bones" (featuring OneRepublic)	2019	46	—	58	—	—	—	—	— (Note: "Bones" did not enter the NZ Top 40 Singles Chart, but peaked at number 13 on the NZ Hot Singles Chart.)	—	—	MC: Gold; RMNZ: Gold	Church
"I Found U" (with Passion Pit)	2019	—	—	—	—	—	—	—	—	—	—		Church
"We Can Get High" (with Yellow Claw)	2019	—	—	—	—	—	—	—	—	—	—		Church
"Roots" (with Valerie Broussard)	2019	— (Note: "Roots" did not enter the Swedish Singellista Chart, but peaked at number 17 on the Swedish Heatseeker Chart.)	—	—	—	—	—	—	—	—	—		Non-album single
"Holy Water"	2019	— (Note: "Holy Water" did not enter the Swedish Singellista Chart, but peaked at number seven on the Swedish Heatseeker Chart.)	—	—	—	—	—	—	—	—	—		Church
"Faith" (with Dolly Parton featuring Mr Probz)	2019	— (Note: "Faith" did not enter the Swedish Singellista Chart, but peaked at number one on the Swedish Heatseeker Chart.)	—	—	—	—	—	—	— (Note: "Faith" did not enter the NZ Top 40 Singles Chart, but peaked at number 25 on the NZ Hot Singles Chart.)	—	—	MC: Platinum; RIAA: Gold	Church
"The Lake" (with Wrabel)	2020	—	—	—	—	—	—	—	—	—	—		Non-album single
"I Fly"	2020	—	—	—	—	—	—	—	—	—	—		Scoob! The Album
"Only a Fool" (with Ship Wrek and Pink Sweats)	2020	—	—	—	—	—	—	—	—	—	—		Non-album singles
"Pretty Please" (with Jackson Wang)	2020	—	—	—	—	—	—	—	—	—	—		Non-album singles
"Fuck Tomorrow Now"	2020	—	—	—	—	—	—	—	—	—	—		Church
"Tu Tu Tu (That's Why We)" (with Nghtmre and Liam O'Donnell)	2020	—	—	—	—	—	75	—	—	—	—		Non-album singles
"Dandelion" (with Jvke)	2021	— (Note: "Dandelion" did not enter the Swedish Singellista Chart, but peaked at number seven on the Swedish Heatseeker Chart.)	—	—	—	—	—	—	— (Note: "Dandelion" did not enter the NZ Top 40 Singles Chart, but peaked at number 31 on the NZ Hot Singles Chart.)	—	—		Non-album singles
"The Best" (with Hook n Sling and Karen Harding)	2021	—	—	—	—	—	—	—	—	—	—		Non-album singles
"Heartbreak Anthem" (with David Guetta and Little Mix)	2021	36	46	58	86	57	23	23	— (Note: "Heartbreak Anthem" did not enter the NZ Top 40 Singles Chart, but peaked at number nine on the NZ Hot Singles Chart.)	3	—	BPI: 2× Platinum; IFPI AUT: Gold; MC: Platinum; RIAA: Gold; RMNZ: Platinum	Rx
"Tears for Later" (with Don Diablo)	2021	—	—	—	—	—	—	—	—	—	—		Forever
"Sweet Talker" (with Years & Years)	2021	— (Note: "Sweet Talker" did not enter the Swedish Singellista Chart, but peaked at number two on the Swedish Heatseeker Chart.)	—	—	—	—	—	—	— (Note: "Sweet Talker" did not enter the NZ Top 40 Singles Chart, but peaked at number 33 on the NZ Hot Singles Chart.)	26	—	BPI: Gold	Night Call
"Alien" (with Lucas & Steve and Ilira)	2021	—	—	—	—	—	—	—	—	—	—		Non-album singles
"When the Lights Go Down" (with Dvbbs featuring Cody Simpson)	2022	—	—	—	—	—	—	—	— (Note: "When the Lights Go Down" did not enter the NZ Top 40 Singles Chart, but peaked at number 36 on the NZ Hot Singles Chart.)	—	—		Non-album singles
"Run" (with Becky Hill)	2022	— (Note: "Run" did not enter the Swedish Singellista Chart, but peaked at number nine on the Swedish Heatseeker Chart.)	—	—	—	—	93	—	— (Note: "Run" did not enter the NZ Top 40 Singles Chart, but peaked at number nine on the NZ Hot Singles Chart.)	21	—	BPI: Gold	Only Honest on the Weekend (Deluxe)
"Good Luck" (with Mabel and Jax Jones)	2022	—	—	—	—	—	—	—	—	45	—		About Last Night...
"Fading Like a Flower" (with Roxette)	2022	90	—	—	—	—	—	—	—	—	—		Non-album singles
"1×1"	2022	—	—	—	—	—	—	—	—	—	—		Non-album singles
"DNA" (with Craig David)	2022	—	—	—	—	—	—	—	—	—	—		22
"Damn (You've Got Me Saying)" (with David Guetta and MNEK)	2022	— (Note: "Damn (You've Got Me Saying)" did not enter the Swedish Singellista Chart, but peaked at number two on the Swedish Heatseeker Chart.)	—	—	—	—	—	—	— (Note: "Damn (You've Got Me Saying)" did not enter the NZ Top 40 Singles Chart, but peaked at number 31 on the NZ Hot Singles Chart.)	—	—		Rx
"Hooked (Hot Stuff)" (with Rika)	2023	—	—	—	—	—	—	—	—	—	—		Non-album single
"I Want You" (with Icona Pop)	2023	—	—	—	—	—	—	—	—	—	—		Club Romantech
"Hungry Heart" (with Steve Aoki and Hayley Kiyoko)	2023	—	—	—	—	—	—	—	—	—	—		Hiroquest 2: Double Helix
"Fool 4 U" (with Jvke featuring Enisa)	2023	—	—	—	—	—	—	—	—	—	—		Rx
"Bang Bang (My Neurodivergent Anthem)"	2023	—	—	—	—	—	—	—	—	—	—		Rx
"Koala"	2023	—	—	—	—	—	—	—	—	—	—		Rx
"Dreamteam" (featuring Neon Trees)	2023	—	—	—	—	—	—	—	—	—	—		Rx
"Little Bit Yours" (featuring Hannah Boleyn)	2023	—	—	—	—	—	—	—	—	—	—		Rx
"One, Two & 3"	2024	—	—	—	—	—	—	—	—	—	—		Rx
"Lighter" (with 5 Seconds of Summer and David Guetta)	2024	— (Note: "Lighter" did not enter the Swedish Singellista Chart, but peaked at number one on the Swedish Heatseeker Chart.)	99	—	—	—	78	—	— (Note: "Lighter" did not enter the NZ Top 40 Singles Chart, but peaked at number seven on the NZ Hot Singles Chart.)	78	—		Rx
"Dust"	2024	—	—	—	—	—	—	—	—	—	—		Rx
"Mountains" (with Jonas Blue and Zoe Wees)	2024	—	—	—	—	—	—	—	—	—	—		Non-album singles
"Morning" (with Cheat Codes, Jason Derulo and De La Ghetto)	2024	—	—	—	—	—	—	—	—	—	—		Non-album singles
"Pretty Low" (with Dillon Francis and Arden Jones)	2024	—	—	—	—	—	—	—	—	—	—		Non-album singles
"8 Days"	2024	—	—	—	—	—	—	—	—	—	—		Non-album singles
"Circles" (with Peach Martine and Secs on the Beach)	2025	—	—	—	—	—	—	—	—	—	—		Non-album singles
"Stay a Little Longer" (with Joel Corry and Izzy Bizu)	2025	—	—	—	—	—	—	—	—	—	—		Non-album singles
"Stay Alive" (with the Devil's Tax Return)	2026	—	—	—	—	—	—	—	—	—	—		The Devil's Tax Return: Volume 1
"Do You Mind" (with the Devil's Tax Return)	2026	—	—	—	—	—	—	—	—	—	—		The Devil's Tax Return: Volume 1
"Can't Take My Eyes Off You" (with the Devil's Tax Return)	2026	—	—	—	—	—	—	—	—	—	—		The Devil's Tax Return: Volume 1
"1234" (with the Devil's Tax Return)	2026	—	—	—	—	—	—	—	—	—	—		The Devil's Tax Return: Volume 1
"When We Were Young"	2026	—	—	—	—	—	—	—	—	—	—		The Devil's Tax Return: Volume 1
"—" denotes a single that did not chart or was not released.

=== As featured artist ===
Title	Year	Album
"Jumbo" (A-Trak featuring Galantis)	2012	Tuna Melt EP

=== Promotional singles ===
Title	Year	Peak chart positions			Album
Title	Year	SWE Heat.	AUS	US Dance	Album
"True Feeling"	2017	1	—	25	The Aviary
"Girls on Boys" (featuring Rozes)	2017	3	96	32	The Aviary
"We Are Born to Play" (featuring Charli XCX)	2020	—	—	—	Super Nintendo World
"Steel"	2020	—	—	—	Church
"Unless It Hurts"	2020	—	—	—	Church
"Stella"	2020	—	—	—	Church
"—" denotes a single that did not chart or was not released.

== Guest appearances ==
Title	Year	Album
"Mercy" (with Kaskade)	2015	Automatic
"Scruffy-Looking Nerfherder"	2016	Star Wars Headspace

== Remixes ==
Title	Year	Original artist(s)
"Heart Weighs a Ton" (Galantis and Alex Metric Remix)	2014	Alex Metric
"Gold Dust" (Galantis and Elgot VIP Mix)	2015	Galantis
"Delilah" (Galantis Remix)	2015	Florence + The Machine
"In My Head" (Misha K and Galantis VIP Mix)	2016	Galantis
"Peanut Butter Jelly" (Maxum and Galantis VIP Mix)	2016	Galantis
"Dominos" (Galantis Remix)	2016	Peter Bjorn and John
"Out of My System" (Galantis Remix)	2016	Youngr
"Pillow Fight" (Galantis and CID VIP Mix)	2017	Galantis
"Shape of You" (Galantis Remix)	2017	Ed Sheeran
"Bloodstain" (Galantis Remix)	2017	Wrabel
"The Hunter" (Galantis and Misha K VIP Mix)	2017	Galantis
"True Feeling" (Galantis and Shndō VIP Mix)	2017	Galantis
"Fetish" (Galantis Remix)	2017	Selena Gomez (featuring Gucci Mane)
"Too Good at Goodbyes"	2017	Sam Smith
"Summer Days" (Galantis Remix)	2018	A R I Z O N A
"Entirety" (Galantis Remix)	2018	Shift K3Y (featuring A*M*E)
"Satisfied" (Galantis and Misha K VIP Mix)	2018	Galantis
"Mama Look at Me Now" (Galantis and Deniz Koyu VIP Mix)	2018	Galantis
"Think About You" (Galantis Remix)	2019	Kygo (featuring Valerie Broussard)
"Bones" (Galantis and Shndō VIP Mix)	2019	Galantis (featuring OneRepublic)
"Faith" (Galantis and Bali Bandits VIP Mix)	2019	Galantis and Dolly Parton (featuring Mr. Probz)
"Never Felt a Love Like This" (VIP Mix)	2020	Galantis and Hook n Sling (featuring Dotan)
"Don't Call Me" (Galantis Remix)	2020	Brando
"Popular Monster" (Galantis and Nghtmre Remix)	2020	Falling in Reverse
"Acredita no Véio (Listen to the Old Man)" (Galantis Version)	2020	Pelé and Rodrigo y Gabriela
"Cinema" (Galantis Remix)	2021	Benny Benassi (featuring Gary Go)
"Retrograde" (Galantis Remix)	2021	Aleyna Tilki
"Buenos Aires" (Galantis and Bali Bandits Remix)	2021	Tchami
"Die For a Man" (Galantis Remix)	2021	Bebe Rexha (featuring Lil Uzi Vert)
"Better Days" (Galantis Remix)	2021	Dermot Kennedy
"My Universe" (Galantis Remix)	2021	Coldplay (featuring BTS)
"Run" (Galantis and Misha K VIP Mix)	2022	Becky Hill and Galantis
"Fading Like a Flower" (Galantis and Roxette)	2022	Roxette and Galantis
"Lil Boo Thang" (Galantis Remix)	2023	Paul Russell

== Music videos ==
Title	Year	Directors
"Smile"	2013	Dano Cerny
"You"	2014	Dano Cerny
"Help"	2014	—
"Runaway (U & I)"	2015	Dano Cerny
"Gold Dust"	2015	Michael C. Mendelsohn
"Peanut Butter Jelly"	2015	Dano Cerny
"In My Head"	2015	Dano Cerny
"Louder Harder Better"	2016	Randi Luna Løfstedt
"No Money"	2016	Andrew Donoho
"Love on Me"	2016	Dano Cerny
"Make Me Feel"	2016	—
"Pillow Fight"	2016	Jeffrey A. Tang Andrew Yuyi Truong
"Hunter"	2017	Ben Fee
"True Feeling"	2017	Dalton Campbell
"Girls on Boys"	2017	Joe Zohar
"Tell Me You Love Me"	2017	MOSSS
"Spaceship"	2018	Ryan Huffman
"Satisfied"	2018	Dano Cerny
"Mama Look At Me Now"	2018	Jordan Pulmano
"Emoji"	2018	Dano Cerny
"San Francisco"	2018	Dano Cerny
"Bones"	2019	Spencer Hord
"We Can Get High"	2019	Sherif Higazy
"Holy Water"	2019	Jason Lester
"Faith"	2019	Dano Cerny
"We Are Born to Play"	2020	—
"Never Felt a Love Like This"	2020	Dano Cerny
"The Lake"	2020	—
"Only a Fool"	2020	Mero Estudio
"Pretty Please"	2020	Jackson Wang & Conglin
"Tu Tu Tu (That's Why We)"	2020	—
"Heartbreak Anthem"	2021	Samuel Douek
"Tears for Later"	2021	Thomas Jarrett
"Sweet Talker"	2021	Sophia Ray
"Alien"	2022	Tim Madden
"Run"	2022	Michael Holyk
"Good Luck"	2022	Isaac Rentz
"DNA"	2022	Toby Roscoe
"Damn (You've Got Me Saying)"	2022	Anze Skrube
"Hooked (Hot Stuff)"	2023	Ray Fiasco
"Hungry Heart"	2023	Hayley Kiyoko
"Bang Bang (My Neurodivergent Anthem)"	2023	Dano Cerny
"Koala"	2023	Anastasia Duchess
"Dreamteam"	2023	Juan Flores Mena
"Little Bit Yours"	2023	Michael C. Mendelsohn
"One, Two & 3"	2024	Michael C. Mendelsohn
"Lighter"	2024	Ryan Fleming
