= Svidden =

Swedish musician

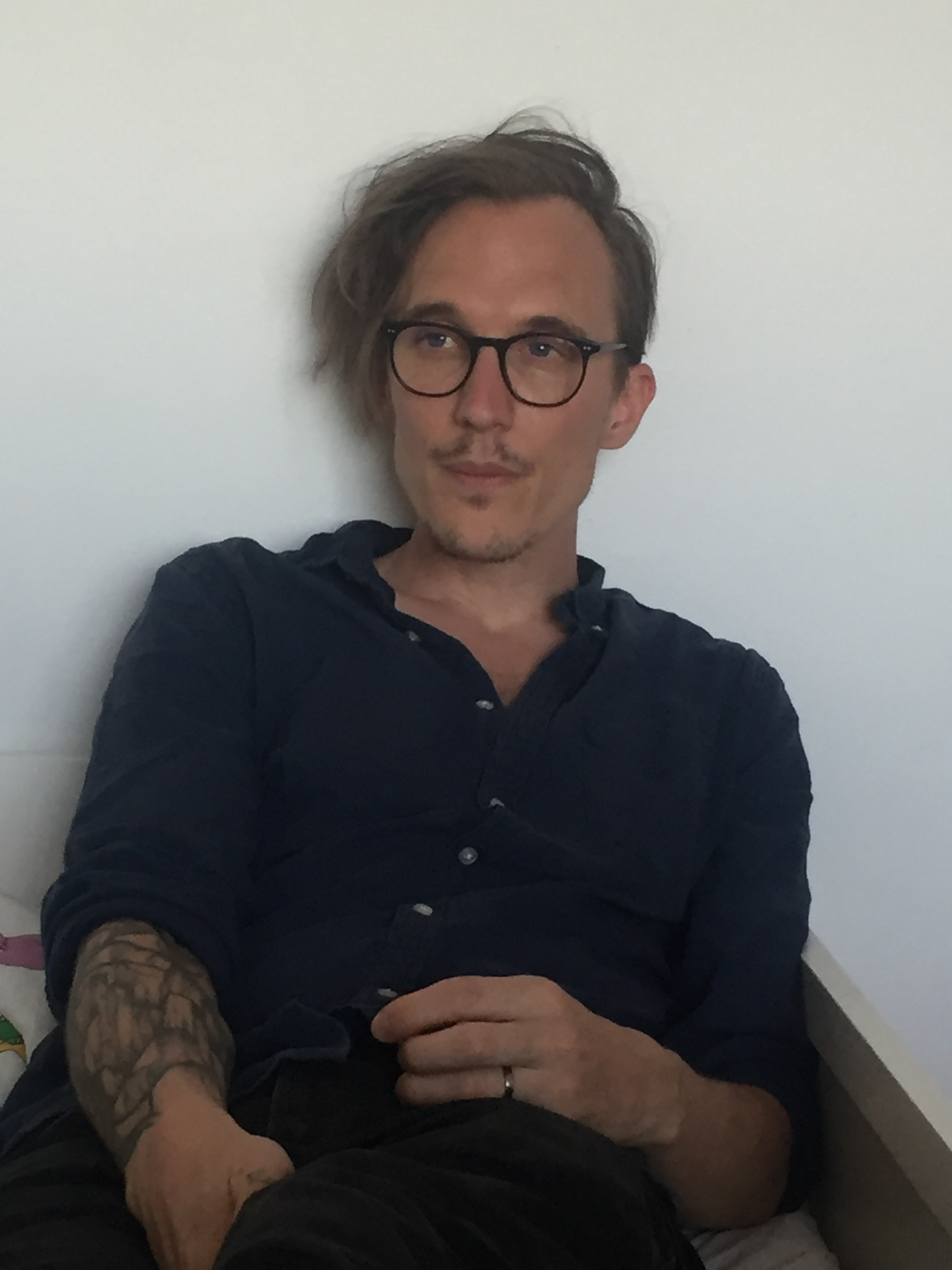

Background information
- Born: Jimmy Koitzsch; 1984 (age 41–42)
- Origin: Sweden
- Occupations: DJ; Songwriter; record producer

Jimmy Koitzsch, also known by his stage name Svidden (born 1984), is a Swedish DJ, record producer, songwriter and musician based in Stockholm. He began his career largely affiliated with the work of Style of Eye, who later went on to form the house music duo Galantis and producing most of their work.

Together with the duo, Svidden has written and produced multi-platinum selling hit singles like "Runaway (U & I)", "No Money", and "Peanut Butter Jelly".

Aside from the project, he has also collaborated with artists like Miike Snow, Hilary Duff, and Adam Lambert.

At the 58th Annual Grammy Awards in 2015, Svidden was nominated for a Grammy in the Best Dance recording category with the song "Runaway (U & I)".

In 2016 he, together with Galantis and Henrik Jonback, received SKAPs (Sweden composers and writers) award for "Producer of the year".

== Discography ==
=== Singles ===
Title	Year	Album
"Feel It Again" (with Seeb and Dan Caplen)	2020	Sad in Scandinavia
"Live You Down"	2023	
"You" (featuring Seeb)	2023	

=== Featured appearances ===
Year	Title	Album
2014	"Footprints" (Style of Eye featuring Svidden)	Footprints

=== Songwriting and production credits ===
Title	Year	Artist(s)	Album	Credits	Written with	Produced with
"We Got The World"	2012	Icona Pop	Icona Pop	Co-writer/Co-producer	Caroline Hjelt, Linus Eklow, Elof Loelv, Aino Jawo, Nicole Morier, Tove Lo	-
"Taken Over"	2013	Rebecca & Fiona	Non-album single	Co-writer/Producer	Fiona Fitzpatrick, Linus Eklow, Rebecca Scheja	-
"Smile"	2014	Galantis	Galantis EP	Co-writer	Christian Karlsson, Linus Eklow, Carl Lof, Salem Al Fakir, Vincent Pontare	-
"Kids" (featuring Sophia Somajo)	2014	Style of Eye	Footprints	Co-writer	Linus Eklow, Sophia Somajo, Ellinor Olovsdotter	-
"Revolution"	2014	Galantis	Galantis EP	Co-writer	Christian Karlsson, Linus Eklow, Henrik Jonback, Jennifer Decilveo, Leon Jean-Marie	-
"You"	2014	Galantis	Galantis EP	Co-writer	Christian Karlsson, Linus Eklow, Vincent Pontare, Carli Löf	-
"Help"	2014	Galantis	Galantis EP	Co-writer	Christian Karlsson, Linus Eklow, Catherine Dennis, Salem Al Fakir, Vincent Pontare	-
"Friend (Hard Times)"	2014	Galantis	Galantis EP	Co-writer	Christian Karlsson, Linus Eklow, Catherine Dennis, Seinabo Sey, Magnus Lidehäll	-
"The Heart That I'm Hearing"	2014	Galantis	Galantis EP	Co-writer	Christian Karlsson, Linus Eklow, Henrik Jonback, Jennifer Decilveo	-
"Runaway (U & I)"	2014	Galantis	Pharmacy	Co-writer/Co-producer	Christian Karlsson, Linus Eklow, Julia Karlsson, Anton Rundberg, Catherine Dennis	Galantis
"The Game" (featuring SAL)	2014	Style of Eye	Footprints	Co-writer/Producer	Linus Eklow, Joakim Jarl, Emma Koitzsch, Andreas Larsson	Style of Eye, Jarly
"Love Looks" (with Lars Allertz)	2014	Style of Eye	Footprints	Co-writer/Producer	Linus Eklow, Joakim Jarl	Style of Eye, Jarly
"Louder" (featuring Sirena)	2014	Style of Eye	Footprints	Co-writer/Producer	Linus Eklow, Joakim Jarl, Elsa Carmona Oljelund, Patrik Berggren	Style of Eye, Jarly
"Like You" (featuring Manotett & Sourz)	2014	Style of Eye	Footprints	Co-writer/Producer	Linus Eklow, Joakim Jarl, Hampus Norlander, Ola Holstad	Style of Eye, Jarly
"Sweetest Heartache" (with Asalto featuring Michel Zitron)	2014	Style of Eye	Footprints	Co-writer/Producer	Linus Eklow, Joakim Jarl, John Martin, Mans Wredenberg, Kevin Heber	Style of Eye, Jarly
"Here with Me" (featuring Laleh)	2014	Style of Eye	Footprints	Co-writer/Producer	Linus Eklow, Joakim Jarl, Laleh Pourkarim	Style of Eye, Jarly
"Take Your Time" (featuring Anna Ståhl)	2014	Style of Eye	Footprints	Co-writer/Producer	Linus Eklow, Joakim Jarl, Hannes Liden, Marcus Lindstrom	Style of Eye, Jarly, Hannes Liden, Marcus Lindstrom
"Footprints" (featuring Svidden)	2014	Style of Eye	Footprints	Featured artist/Co-writer/Producer	Linus Eklow, Joakim Jarl, Emma Koitzsch	Style of Eye, Jarly
"We Will Never Die" (featuring Grizzly)	2014	Style of Eye	Footprints	Co-writer/Producer	Linus Eklow, Joakim Jarl, Simone Yemaine	Style of Eye, Jarly
"Stockholm"	2014	Rebecca & Fiona	Beauty Is Pain	Co-writer/Producer	Fiona Fitzpatrick, Linus Eklow, Rebecca Scheja	Style of Eye
"Jump"	2014	Sharks	Non-album single	Co-writer/Producer	Alexander Papadimas, Linus Eklow, Joakim Jarl	Style of Eye, Jarly
"Sparks"	2015	Hilary Duff	Breathe In. Breathe Out.	Co-producer	-	Peter Thomas, Bloodshy, Emily Wright
"Gold Dust"	2015	Galantis	Pharmacy	Co-writer/Co-producer	Christian Karlsson, Linus Eklow, Catherine Dennis, Vincent Pontare	Galantis
"Peanut Butter Jelly"	2015	Galantis	Pharmacy	Co-writer/Co-producer	Christian Karlsson, Linus Eklow, Henrik Jonback, Martina Sorbara, Philip Hurtt, Anthony Bell	Galantis, The Young Professionals
"Forever Tonight"	2015	Galantis	Pharmacy	Co-writer/Co-producer	Christian Karlsson, Linus Eklow, Henrik Jonback, Jennifer Decilveo	Galantis
"In My Head"	2015	Galantis	Pharmacy	Co-writer/Co-producer	Christian Karlsson, Linus Eklow, Henrik Jonback, Jennifer Decilveo	Galantis
"Dancin' to the Sound of a Broken Heart"	2015	Galantis	Pharmacy	Co-writer/Co-producer	Christian Karlsson, Linus Eklow, Nicole Morier, Vincent Pontare	Galantis
"Louder, Harder, Better"	2015	Galantis	Pharmacy	Co-writer/Co-producer	Christian Karlsson, Linus Eklow, Catherine Dennis	Galantis
"Kill Em' with the Love"	2015	Galantis	Pharmacy	Co-writer/Co-producer	Christian Karlsson, Linus Eklow, Salem Al Fakir, Vincent Pontare	Galantis
"Call If You Need Me"	2015	Galantis	Pharmacy	Co-writer/Co-producer	Christian Karlsson, Linus Eklow, Elof Loelv, Salem Al Fakir, Vincent Pontare	Galantis
"Firebird"	2015	Galantis	Pharmacy	Co-writer/Co-producer	Christian Karlsson, Linus Eklow, Henrik Jonback, Martina Sorbara	Galantis
"Don't Care"	2015	Galantis	Pharmacy	Co-writer/Co-producer	Christian Karlsson, Linus Eklow, Ivo de Jong, Marc van Osterbaan, Leon Jean-Marie, Michael Jenner	Galantis, East & Young
"Water"	2015	Galantis	Pharmacy	Co-writer/Co-producer	Christian Karlsson, Linus Eklow, Andrew Jackson, Timothy Gordline	Galantis
"The Light"	2015	Adam Lambert	The Original High	Co-writer	Linus Eklow, Tiffany Amber, Lukas Loules	-
"Heavy Fire"	2015	Adam Lambert	The Original High	Co-writer/Producer	Adam Lambert, Julia Karlsson, Anton Rundberg, Linus Eklow, Joakim Jarl, Hampus Narlander, Elin Blom	Style of Eye, Jarly, Peter Carlsson
"Morning Sun"	2015	Melonia	Non-album single	Co-writer/Producer	Joakim Jarl	Jarly
"Klein Blue"	2015	Sophia Somajo	Freudian Slip	Co-writer/Producer	Per Eklund, Sophia Somajo	Per Eklund
"Mouth to Mouth"	2016	Sophia Somajo	Freudian Slip	Co-writer/Producer	Per Eklund,	Per Eklund
"Over and Over"	2016	Miike Snow	iii	Co-writer	Christian Karlsson, Pontus Winnberg, Andrew Wyatt	-
"No Money"	2016	Galantis	The Aviary	Co-writer/Producer	Christian Karlsson, Linus Eklow, Henrik Jonback, Nicholas Gale, Andrew Bullimore	Galantis, Henrik Jonback, Digital Farm Animals, Andrew Bullimore
"Darling"	2016	Melonia	Non-album single	Co-writer/Producer	Joakim Jarl, Alexander Papadimas	-
"Unreal"	2016	Melonia	Non-album single	Co-writer/Producer	Joakim Jarl	-
"Make Me Feel" (with East & Young)	2016	Galantis	Non-album single	Co-writer/Producer	Christian Karlsson, Linus Eklow, Henrik Jonback, Ivo de Jong, Marc van Osterbaan, Jonathan Hume, Michael Jenner	Galantis, East & Young, Henrik Jonback, Jon Hume
"Love on Me" (with Hook n Sling)	2016	Galantis	The Aviary	Co-writer/Producer	Christian Karlsson, Linus Eklow, Henrik Jonback, Anthony Maniscalco, Catherine Dennis, Laura White, Richard Boardman, Sarah Blanchard	Galantis, Hook n Sling, Henrik Jonback
"Pillow Fight"	2016	Galantis	The Aviary	Co-writer/Producer	Christian Karlsson, Linus Eklow, Henrik Jonback, Matthew Bair	Galantis, Henrik Jonback
"Rich Boy"	2017	Galantis	Non-album single	Co-writer/Producer	Christian Karlsson, Linus Eklow, Henrik Jonback, Chiara Hunter, Fridolin Walcher, Karen Poole	Galantis, Henrik Jonback, Freedo
"Hunter"	2017	Galantis	The Aviary	Co-writer/Producer	Christian Karlsson, Linus Eklow, Henrik Jonback, Hannah Wilson, Joshua Wilkinson, Ki McPhail	Galantis, Henrik Jonback, Josh Wilkinson, Ki Fitzgerald
"True Feeling"	2017	Galantis	The Aviary	Co-writer/Producer	Christian Karlsson, Linus Eklow, Henrik Jonback, Stephen Wrabel, Candy Shields	Galantis, Henrik Jonback
"Girls on Boys" (with ROZES)	2017	Galantis	The Aviary	Co-writer/Producer	Christian Karlsson, Linus Eklow, Henrik Jonback, Elizabeth Mencel, Tobias Gad, Rasmus Cantoreggi, Afshin Salmani	-
"Hey Alligator"	2017	Galantis	The Aviary	Co-writer/Producer	Christian Karlsson, Linus Eklow, Bonnie McKee, John Newman	Galantis, Henrik Jonback
"Salvage (Up All Night)" (featuring Poo Bear)	2017	Galantis	The Aviary	Co-writer/Producer	Christian Karlsson, Linus Eklow, Jason Boyd	Galantis, Henrik Jonback, Poo Bear
"Tell Me You Love Me" (with Throttle)	2017	Galantis	The Aviary	Co-writer/Producer	Christian Karlsson, Linus Eklow, Henrik Jonback, Robert Bergin, Eddie Jenkins	Galantis, Throttle, Henrik Jonback
"Hello"	2017	Galantis	The Aviary	Co-writer/Producer	Christian Karlsson, Linus Eklow, Henrik Jonback, Ross Golan, Eric Frederic, Jacob Kasher Hindlin, Ammar Malik	Galantis, Henrik Jonback
"Written in the Scars" (featuring Wrabel)	2017	Galantis	The Aviary	Co-writer/Producer	Christian Karlsson, Linus Eklow, Henrik Jonback, Stephen Wrabel, Andrew Jackson, Drew Pearson	Galantis, Henrik Jonback, Drew Pearson
"Call Me Home"	2017	Galantis	The Aviary	Co-writer/Producer	Christian Karlsson, Linus Eklow, Henrik Jonback, Samuel Martin	Galantis, Henrik Jonback, Sam Martin
"Standing When It All Falls Down" (featuring Roshi)	2017	John De Sohn	Non-album single	Co-writer/Producer	Andreas Moe, Björn Johnsson, Cassandra Ströberg	Björn Johnsson, Niklas Berwall
"Spaceship" (featuring Uffie)	2018	Galantis	TBA	Co-writer/Producer	Christian Karlsson, Linus Eklow, Henrik Jonback, John Theodore Geiger II, Ammar Malik, Evan Voytas	Galantis, Henrik Jonback
"Satisfied" (featuring Max)	2018	Galantis	TBA	Co-writer/Producer	Christian Karlsson, Linus Eklow, Henrik Jonback, Joshua Coleman, Joseph Spargur, Emily Schwartz, Scott Friedman, Maxwell Schneider	Galantis, Henrik Jonback
"Mama Look at Me Now"	2018	Galantis	TBA	Co-writer/Producer	Christian Karlsson, Linus Eklow, Henrik Jonback, Catherine Dennis, Carl Lehman	Galantis, Henrik Jonback
"Emoji"	2018	Galantis	TBA	Co-writer/Producer	Christian Karlsson, Linus Eklow, Henrik Jonback, Catherine Dennis	Galantis, Henrik Jonback
"San Francisco" (featuring Sofia Carson)	2018	Galantis	TBA	Co-writer/Producer	-	Galantis, Henrik Jonback
"Bones" (featuring OneRepublic)	2019	Galantis	TBA	Co-writer/Co-producer	Andrew Grammer, Ryan Tedder, David Brook, Brett McLaughlin, Daniel Majic, Justin Franks, Christian Karlsson, Linus Eklow, Henrik Jonback	Galantis, Henrik Jonback, Majic, DJ Frank E
"I Found You" (featuring Galantis)	2019	Passion Pit	TBA	Co-writer/Co-producer	Christian Karlsson, Henrik Jonback, Johannes Henriksson, Michael Angelakos, Richard Anderson	Christian Karlsson, Henrik Jonback, Johannes Henriksson, Michael Angelakos, Richard Anderson
"Better Off Without You" (featuring Shift K3Y)	2020	Becky Hill	TBA	Co-producer	Lewis Shay Jankel, Rebecca Claire Hill	Jarly, Shift K3Y
"I Think She Knows" (featuring My Marianne)	2020	Twelve	TBA	Co-producer	Tim Mosley, Nate "Danja" Hills, Justin Timberlake	Noel Svahn
"Mad World" (featuring XOV)	2020	Twelve	TBA	Co-producer	Gary Jules	Noel Svahn

== Remixes ==
Title	Year	Artist(s)
"Vart jag mig i världen vänder" Fugly remix	2011	Den Svenska Björnstammen
"Roar" Style of Eye remix	2013	Axwell, Ingrosso
"Clarity" Style of Eye remix	2013	Zedd, Foxes
"Love Louder" Style of Eye remix	2014	John Martin
"Delilah" Galantis remix	2015	Florence + The Machine
"Dominos" Galantis remix	2016	Peter, Bjorn and John
"Fetish" feat. Gucci Mane Galantis remix	2017	Selena Gomez
"Bloodstain" Galantis remix	2017	Wrabel
"Too Good At Goodbyes" Galantis remix	2017	Sam Smith
