= List of songs written by Cathy Dennis =

Cathy Dennis is a British singer-songwriter, record producer and actress. After a moderately successful international solo career, Dennis later received great success as a writer of pop songs, scoring eight UK number ones and winning five Ivor Novello Awards.

This is a list of released singles, songs and album tracks, recorded by other artists, that have been written or co-written by Cathy Dennis.

Below is a round-up of the chart positions achieved around the world by singles released featuring the writing credits of Cathy Dennis.

== Songwriting career ==
Dennis has achieved critical and commercial success as a songwriter, winning a number of award-winning songs and penning many international hit singles. She has also contributed backing vocals to many of these recordings. Dennis has provided songs for Simon Fuller acts such as the Spice Girls, S Club 7 and the Idol franchise contestants where she co-wrote "Bumper to Bumper", the B-side to the Spice Girls' first hit single "Wannabe".

Her highest-selling composition, "Can't Get You Out of My Head" (recorded by Kylie Minogue), spent four weeks at number one in Britain while also rekindling interest in Minogue in America (where it hit #7 on the Billboard Hot 100). Can't Get You Out of My Head sold over three million copies worldwide to become the world's second highest selling single in 2001. Her co-written single "I Kissed a Girl" by Katy Perry also hit No. 1 in the USA.

"Can't Get You Out of My Head" also won Dennis an Ivor Novello Award as 2001's most performed composition. She won the same award in 2003 for "Anything Is Possible". In the US, Dennis has received awards from Billboard, Grammy for compositions with Kylie Minogue and Britney Spears.

Dennis co-wrote the Pop Idol theme (re-used for numerous international remakes of the show, including American Idol), and many Idol contestants have recorded her songs, including Will Young, Gareth Gates, Kelly Clarkson, and Clay Aiken. Clarkson's single "Before Your Love" (a double a-side with "A Moment Like This") was Dennis' first US No. 1.

In 2011, Cathy had a cut on the soundtrack for the remake of the film Arthur starring Russell Brand, the song was called "Can't Buy You" and was produced by Mark Ronson. In 2014, she co-wrote a track on Chris Brown's album "X" which debuted at number 2 on the US Billboard 200 chart.

Most recently, Cathy has co-written 3 tracks on the Galantis album "Pharmacy", one of which, "Runaway (U & I)" reached No. 1 in the UK Dance chart and No. 9 in the US Dance chart.

== Full discography of songs written by Cathy Dennis ==
=== International singles and certifications ===
Year	Artist	Title	Peak chart positions											Certifications
Year	Artist	Title	UK	AUT	BEL	GER	IRE	NED	NZ	NOR	SWE	SWI	US	Certifications
1992	Dannii Minogue	"Love's on Every Corner"	44	—	—	—	—	—	—	—	—	—	—	
1999	S Club 7	"Two in a Million"	2	—	—	—	8	45	1	—	—	95	—	UK: Silver
2000	S Club 7	"Reach"	2	—	—	62	8	—	28	—	42	30	—	UK: Platinum
2000	S Club 7	"Natural"	3	—	—	42	17	—	—	—	—	64	—	
2000	S Club 7	"Never Had a Dream Come True"	1	—	—	—	2	—	31	—	10	—	10	UK: Platinum; SWE: Gold
2001	Kylie Minogue	"Can't Get You Out of My Head"	1	1	1	1	1	1	1	1	1	1	7	UK: 2× Platinum; AUT: Platinum; BEL: 2× Platinum; GER: Platinum; NZ: Gold; SWE: Platinum; SWI: Platinum; US: Gold
2001	S Club 7	"Have You Ever"	1	49	—	37	4	—	20	—	21	40	—	UK: Gold
2001	A*Teens	"Heartbreak Lullaby"	—	—	—	77	—	—	—	—	6	97	—	
2002	Will Young	"Anything Is Possible"	1	—	—	—	2	—	—	—	—	—	—	UK: 3× Platinum
2002	S Club Juniors	"One Step Closer"	2	—	—	—	5	—	—	—	—	—	—	UK: Silver
2002	allSTARS*	"Back When"	19	—	—	—	—	—	—	—	—	—	—	
2002	Kelly Clarkson	"Before Your Love"	—	—	—	—	—	—	—	—	—	—	1	US: Gold
2002	Kylie Minogue	"Come into My World"	8	59	35	47	—	35	20	—	—	66	91	
2003	S Club	"Say Goodbye"	2	—	—	84	6	—	—	—	—	—	—	
2003	Rachel Stevens	"Sweet Dreams My LA Ex"	2	—	25	64	3	79	—	5	24	63	—	UK: Silver
2004	Britney Spears	"Toxic"	1	5	6	4	1	6	2	1	2	4	9	UK: Gold; NZ: Gold; SWE: Gold; US: Gold
2004	Jentina	"French Kisses"	20	—	—	—	—	—	—	—	—	—	—	
2007	Sophie Ellis-Bextor	"Catch You"	8	—	—	—	29	84	—	—	—	92	—	
2007	Sugababes	"About You Now"	1	4	28	4	2	16	18	7	40	21	—	UK: Gold
2007	David Guetta	"Baby When the Light"	50	62	15	59	—	30	—	—	35	25	—	
2008	Katy Perry	"I Kissed a Girl"	1	1	1	1	1	3	1	1	1	1	1	UK: Platinum; AUT: Platinum; BEL: Gold; GER: Platinum; NZ: Platinum; SWE: Platinum; SWI: Platinum; US: 5× Platinum
2009	Jonas Brothers	"Paranoid"	56	—	—	65	27	—	—	20	53	—	37	
2009	Kris Allen	"No Boundaries"	92	—	—	—	—	—	—	—	—	—	11	
2009	Adam Lambert	"No Boundaries"	—	—	—	—	—	—	38	—	—	—	72	
2010	Diana Vickers	"Once"	1	—	—	—	3	—	—	—	—	—	—	UK: Silver
2010	Mark Ronson	"Somebody to Love Me"	55	—	16	—	—	—	—	—	—	—	—	
2011	Sophie Ellis-Bextor	"Off & On"	—	—	—	—	—	—	—	—	—	—	—	
2013	Kelly Clarkson	"4 Carats"	—	—	—	—	—	—	—	—	—	—	—	
2014	Galantis	"Runaway (U & I)"	4	39	6	58	6	3	6	12	25	42	—	UK: Platinum; NZ: Platinum; SWE: 2× Platinum
2015	Galantis	"Gold Dust"	—	—	—	—	—	—	—	—	—	—	—	
2016	Galantis	"Love on Me"	16	46	11	39	19	29	—	—	27	64	—	UK: Gold; GER: Gold; IT: Platinum
2018	Galantis	"Mama Look at Me Now"	—	—	—	—	—	—	—	—	—	—	—	
2018	Galantis	"Emoji"	—	—	—	—	—	—	—	—	—	—	—	
2019	Galantis	"Holy Water"	—	—	—	—	—	—	—	—	—	—	—	
2022	KT Tunstall	"I Am the Pilot"	—	—	—	—	—	—	—	—	—	—	—	

=== All credited contributions ===
indicates a background vocal contribution.

indicates an un-credited vocal contribution.

Year	Artist	Album	Song	Co-written with
1991	Liu Xiaohui	In Your Dreams	"Lover in the Stars"	Danny Poku
1992	Priscilla Chan	Return	"Moon"	Michael Leeson, Terence Britten
1992	Dannii Minogue	Get into You	"Love's on Every Corner"	Danny Poku, Paul Taylor
1993	Lirian	Am I Really in Love?	"Senior Love Home"	Shep Pettibone, Tony Shimkin
1994	Liu Xiaohui	Change to Select	"Lover in the Stars"	Danny Poku
1994	Linda Wong	Boundless Moment	"Emotional Ensemble"	Terence Britten
1996	Spice Girls	Non-album single	"Bumper to Bumper"	Melanie Brown, Emma Bunton, Melanie Chrisholm, Geraldine Horner, Paul "Pablo" Wilson, Andy Watkins
1998	Phil Roy	As Good As It Gets OST	"Under Stars"	Phil Roy, Heitor Pereira
1999	21st Century Girls	21st Century Girls	"Teenage Attack"	Leanne Garner, Fiona Garner, Katelyn Turney, Meriam Mohammad, Charlotte Fendek, Todrick Allen
1999	21st Century Girls	21st Century Girls	"Drive"	Leanne Garner, Fiona Garner, Katelyn Turney, Meriam Mohammad, Charlotte Fendek
1999	S Club 7	S Club	"Two in a Million"	Simon Ellis
1999	S Club 7	S Club	"Viva La Fiesta"	Hallegir Rustan, Mikkel Eriksen, Tor Hermansen
1999	S Club 7	S Club	"I Really Miss You"	Eliot Kennedy, Patrick Lincoln
1999	S Club 7	S Club	"Hope for the Future"	Danny Poku
1999	S Club 7	S Club	"So Right"	Danny Poku
2000	S Club 7	7	"Reach"	Andrew Todd
2000	S Club 7	7	"Natural"	Norma Ray, Jean Fredenucci, Andrew Todd
2000	S Club 7	7	"I'll Keep Waiting"	Simon Ellis
2000	S Club 7	7	"All in Love Is Fair"	Simon Ellis
2000	S Club 7	7	"Love Train"	Andrew Todd
2000	S Club 7	7	"I'll Be There"	Danny Poku
2000	S Club 7	7	"Never Had a Dream Come True"	Simon Ellis
2000	S Club 7	Non-album single	"If It's Love"	Simon Ellis
2000	Hooverphonic	The Magnificent Tree	"Jackie Cane"	Alexander Callier
2000	S Club 7	Non-album single	"Perfect Christmas"	Simon Ellis
2001	A-Teens	Teen Spirit	"Heartbreak Lullaby"	Jan Kask, Peter Mansson
2001	Kylie Minogue	Fever	"Can't Get You Out of My Head"	Robert Davis
2001	Kylie Minogue	Fever	"Come into My World"	Robert Davis
2001	Kylie Minogue	Fever	"Dancefloor"	Steve Anderson
2001	S Club 7	Sunshine	"Have You Ever"	Andrew Frampton, Christopher Braide
2001	S Club 7	Sunshine	"Boy Like You"	Lauren Christy
2001	S Club 7	Sunshine	"Sunshine"	Joanne O'Meara, Paul Cattermole, Bradley McIntosh, Tina Barrett, Hannah Spearritt, Rachel Stevens, Jonathan Lee, Yak Bondy
2001	S Club 7	Sunshine	"Dance, Dance, Dance"	Julian Gingell, Barry Stone
2001	S Club 7	Sunshine	"Right Guy"	Bradley McIntosh
2001	Hear'Say	Everybody	"Suddenly"	Oskar Paul
2001	Hear'Say	Everybody	"Home Again"	Simon Ellis
2002	Will Young	From Now On	"Anything Is Possible"	Christopher Braide
2002	S Club 8	Together	"One Step Closer"	Michael Percy, Timothy Lever
2002	Allstars	Allstars	"Back When"	Michael Percy, Timothy Lever
2002	Kelly Clarkson	Non-album single	"Before Your Love"	Gary Burr, Desmond Child
2002	Will Young	From Now On	"Lover Won't You Stay"	Guy Chambers
2002	Will Young	From Now On	"Lovestruck"	William Young
2002	Will Young	From Now On	"What's in Goodbye"	Burt Bacharach
2002	Will Young	From Now On	"Cruel to Be Kind"	William Young
2002	S Club 8	Together	"Wherever You Are"	Simon Ellis
2002	S Club 8	Together	"Anytime Anywhere"	Andrew Todd
2002	Gareth Gates	What My Heart Wants to Say	"Tell Me One More Time"	Oskar Paul, Andrew Fromm
2002	S Club 7	Seeing Double	"Do It Till We Drop"	John Lisners
2002	S Club 7	Seeing Double	"Who Do You Think You Are?"	John Lisners
2003	Jason Prince	The Collection	"Evergreen"	Christopher Braide
2003	Gareth Gates	Go Your Own Way	"Dance Again"	Steve McCutcheon
2003	Celine Dion	One Heart	"Reveal"	Greg Wells
2003	Delta Goodrem	Innocent Eyes	"Throw It Away"	Gary Barlow, Eliot Kennedy
2003	Ronan Keating	Non-album single	"This is It"	Ronan Keating, Christopher Braide
2003	S Club 7	Best: The Greatest Hits of S Club 7	"Say Goodbye"	Christopher Braide
2003	Amy Studt	False Smiles	"Seconds Away"	Amy Studt
2003	Thalía	Thalía	"Misbehavin'"	David Siegel, Steven Morales
2003	Rachel Stevens	Funky Dory	"Sweet Dreams My LA Ex"	Christian Karlsson, Pontus Winnberg, Henrik Jonback
2003	Rachel Stevens	Funky Dory	"Glide"	Christian Karlsson, Pontus Winnberg, Henrik Jonback
2003	Rachel Stevens	Funky Dory	"Heaven Has to Wait"	Anders Bagge, Arnthor Birgisson
2003	Rachel Stevens	Funky Dory	"Little Secret"	Guy Chambers
2003	S Club 8	Sundown	"Drawn to You"	Ian Allan, Kieron Bass, Mark Bass, Nathan Bass
2003	Clay Aiken	Measure of a Man	"Measure of a Man"	Steven Morales, David Siegel
2003	Britney Spears	In the Zone	"Showdown"	Britney Spears, Christian Karlsson, Pontus Winnberg, Henrik Jonback
2003	Britney Spears	In the Zone	"Toxic"	Christian Karlsson, Pontus Winnberg, Henrik Jonback
2003	Kylie Minogue	Body Language	"After Dark"	Christopher Braide
2003	Will Young	Non-album single	"Ticket to Love"	William Young
2003	Hooverphonic	Sit Down and Listen To	"The Last Thing I Need is You"	Alexander Callier, Paul Campbell
2004	TEARs	Non-album single	"I Found Love"	Robert Davis
2004	Emma Bunton	Free Me	"Lay Your Love on Me"	Emma Bunton
2004	Janet Jackson	Damita Jo	"Island Life"	Janet Jackson, Scott Storch
2004	Jentina	Jentina	"French Kisses"	Jentina Chapman, Greg Wells
2004	Delta Goodrem	Mistaken Identity (single)	"How a Dream Looks"	Guy Chambers
2004	Delta Goodrem	Mistaken Identity	"Analyst"	Delta Goodrem, Guy Chambers
2004	Delta Goodrem	Mistaken Identity	"Electric Storm"	Delta Goodrem, Guy Chambers
2004	Delta Goodrem	Mistaken Identity	"Sanctuary"	Delta Goodrem, Guy Chambers
2005	JamX	Non-album single	"Blue Monday" (with DeLeon featuring Bernard Sumner)	Gillian Gilbert, Peter Hook, Paul Harris, Bernard Sumner, Robert Davis
2005	Sugababes	Non-album single	"Like the Weather"	Mutya Buena, Keisha Buchanan, Heidi Range, Guy Sigsworth
2005	Sugababes	Taller in More Ways	"Bruised"	Mutya Buena, Keisha Buchanan, Heidi Range, Guy Sigsworth
2006	P!nk	I'm Not Dead	"Centerfold"	Greg Kurstin
2006	Emma Bunton	Life in Mono	"Mischievous"	Emma Bunton, Greg Kurstin
2007	Sophie Ellis-Bextor	Trip the Light Fantastic	"Catch You"	Greg Kurstin, Rhys Barker
2007	Melanie C	This Time	"Protected"	Melanie Chisholm, Guy Chambers
2007	David Guetta	Pop Life	"Baby When the Light" (featuring Cozi)	Pierre Guetta, Joachim Garraud, Steve Angello
2007	Sugababes	Change	"About You Now"	Lukasz Gottwald
2007	Sugababes	Change	"Surprise"	Lukasz Gottwald
2007	Sugababes	Change	"Open the Door"	Keisha Buchanan, Heidi Range, Lukasz Gottwald
2007	Róisín Murphy	Non-album single	"Sunshine"	Róisín Murphy, Dean Honer, Richard Barrett
2007	Carrie Underwood	Carnival Ride	"You Won't Find This"	Thomas Shapiro
2007	Nana Tanimura	Non-album single	"Jealous Girl"	Richard Nowels Jr.
2007	Jordin Sparks	Jordin Sparks	"Young and in Love"	Christian Karlsson, Pontus Winnberg, Henrik Jonback
2007	Kylie Minogue	X	"Sensitized"	Serge Gainsbourg, Guy Chambers
2008	Leon Jean-Marie	Bent Out of Shape	"Bed of Nails"	Leon Jean-Marie, Mark Ronson, Johnny Pearson
2008	Katy Perry	One of the Boys	"I Kissed a Girl"	Katheryn Hudson, Lukasz Gottwald, Benjamin Levin
2008	Vanessa Hudgens	Identified	"Identified"	Lukasz Gottwald, Karl Sandberg
2008	Vanessa Hudgens	Identified	"First Bad Habit"	Lukasz Gottwald
2008	Vanessa Hudgens	Identified	"Don't Ask Why"	Lukasz Gottwald, Beau Dozier
2008	Vanessa Hudgens	Identified	"Amazed" (featuring Lil Mama)	Lukasz Gottwald, Benjamin Levin, Niatia Kirland
2008	David Cook	David Cook	"Heroes"	David Cook, Raine Maida
2009	Jonas Brothers	Lines, Vines and Trying Times	"Paranoid"	Nicholas Jonas, Joseph Jonas, Kevin Jonas II, John Fields
2009	Daniel Merriweather	Love & War	"Chainsaw"	William Hawkshaw
2010	Belinda Peregrin	Carpe Diem	"Duele"	Belinda Peregrin, Nacho Peregrin, Christopher Braide
2010	Livvi Franc	Non-album single	"Automatik"	Olivia Waithe, Evan Kidd Bogart, Nadir Khayat
2010	Diana Vickers	Songs from the Tainted Cherry Tree	"Once"	Francis White
2010	Sophie Ellis-Bextor	Non-album single	"Sophia Loren"	Christopher Rojas
2010	Pixie Lott	Turn It Up Louder	"Doing Fine (Without You)"	Victoria Lott, Christopher Braide
2010	The Wanted	The Wanted	"Replace Your Heart"	Kasia Livingston, Greg Kurstin
2010	Hooverphonic	The Night Before	"Identical Twin"	Alexander Callier
2010	Mark Ronson & The Business Intl.	Record Collection	"Somebody to Love Me" (featuring Boy George and Andrew Wyatt)	Mark Ronson, Anthony Rossomando, Andrew Wyatt, Alexander Greenwald, Jason Sellards, Keinan Warsame, Nicholas Movshon
2010	Christina Aguilera	Bionic	"So What You Got" (recorded but unreleased)	Christina Aguilera, Dr Luke
2011	Sophie Ellis-Bextor	Make a Scene	"Revolution"	Sophie Ellis-Bextor, Greg Kurstin
2011	Sophie Ellis-Bextor	Make a Scene	"Off & On"	Róisín Murphy, Adam Wiles
2011	Hitomi	Spirit	"Sweet & Honey"	James Nosanow
2011	Jake Zyrus	Infinity	"Lost the Best Thing"	Carsten Schack, Sean Hurley
2011	Pixie Lott	Young Foolish Happy	"Come Get It Now"	Victoria Lott, Benjamin Hudson McIldowie, Robin French
2012	Little Mix	DNA	"Case Closed"	Perrie Edwards, Jessica Nelson, Leigh-Anne Pinnock, Jade Thirlwall, Bobbie Lamond, Darren Lewis, Iylola Babalola
2013	Mark Knight	Non-album single	"Your Love"	Mark Knight, Andrew Meecham, Dean Meredith, Robert Davis
2013	Diane Birch	Speak a Little Louder	"Love and War"	Diane Birch, James Nosanow
2013	Kelly Clarkson	Wrapped in Red	"4 Carats"	Kelly Clarkson, Olivia Waithe, Greg Kurstin
2014	Galantis	Galantis EP	"Help"	Christian Karlsson, Linus Eklow, Jimmy "Svidden" Koitzsch, Salem Al Fakir, Vincent Pontare
2014	Galantis	Galantis EP	"Friend (Hard Times)"	Christian Karlsson, Linus Eklow, Jimmy "Svidden" Koitzsch, Seinabo Sey, Magnus Lidehäll
2014	Dreabb	Non-album single	"La Mia Divinita"	Christian Karlsson, Pontus Winnberg, Henrik Jonback
2014	Chris Brown	X	"Don't Be Gone Too Long"	Christopher Brown, Michael McHenry, Ryan Buendia, Kyle Edwards, Jean-Baptiste Kouame, Scott Hoffman, Clarence Coffee Jr.
2014	Galantis	Pharmacy	"Runaway (U & I)"	Christian Karlsson, Linus Eklow, Jimmy "Svidden" Koitzsch, Julia Karlsson, Anton Rundberg
2014	AlunaGeorge	Non-album single	"Supernatural"	Aluna Francis, George Reid, Scott Hoffman
2015	Galantis	Pharmacy	"Gold Dust"	Christian Karlsson, Linus Eklow, Jimmy "Svidden" Koitzsch, Vincent Pontare
2015	Galantis	Pharmacy	"Louder, Harder, Better"	Christian Karlsson, Linus Eklow, Jimmy "Svidden" Koitzsch
2016	Santigold	99¢	"Banshee"	Santi White, Patrik Berger, John Hill, Sarah Hudson
2016	AlunaGeorge	I Remember	"Heartbreak Horizon"	Aluna Francis, George Reid
2016	Galantis	The Aviary	"Love on Me" (with Hook n Sling)	Christian Karlsson, Linus Eklow, Jimmy "Svidden" Koitzsch, Henrik Jonback, Anthony Maniscalco, Laura White, Richard Boardman, Sarah Blanchard
2017	Liv Dawson	Non-album single	"Searching"	Olivia Dawson, Howard Lawrence, Guy Lawrence, James Napier, Christian Karlsson, Pontus Winnberg, Henrik Jonback
2017	Cashmere Cat	9	"Plz Don't Go" (featuring Jhene Aiko)	Magnus August Hoiberg, Benjamin Levin, Jhene Chilombo, Daniella Vidmar
2017	EXO	Universe EP	"Stay"	Robert Gerongco, Samuel Gerongco, Terence Lam
2018	Fairlane	Non-album single	"Uncover You" (featuring Ilsey)	Nina Woodford-Wells, Ilsey Juber, Andrew Goldstein
2018	Galantis	Non-album single	"Mama Look at Me Now"	Christian Karlsson, Linus Eklow, Jimmy "Svidden" Koitzsch, Henrik Jonback, Carl Lehman
2018	Galantis	Non-album single	"Emoji"	Christian Karlsson, Linus Eklow, Jimmy "Svidden" Koitzsch, Henrik Jonback
2019	Galantis	Church	"Holy Water"	Christian Karlsson, Linus Eklow, Jimmy "Svidden" Koitzsch, Pontus Winnberg, Henrik Jonback
2020	Galantis	Church	"Steel"	Christian Karlsson, Henrik Jonback, Salem Al Fakir, Vincent Pontare, Jan Postma, Jordi Fluiter
2020	Galantis	Church	"Unless It Hurts"	Christian Karlsson, Henrik Jonback, Salem Al Fakir, Vincent Pontare, Jan Postma, Jordi Fluiter
2020	Galantis	Church	"Stella"	Christian Karlsson, Henrik Jonback, Jan Postma, Jordi Fluiter
2020	Galantis	Church	"F*** Tomorrow Now"	Christian Karlsson, Henrik Jonback, Jan Postma, Jordi Fluiter
2020	Agnes	Non-album single	"Goodlife"	Agnes Carlsson, Salem Al Fakir, Vincent Pontare
2022	KT Tunstall	Nut	"I Am the Pilot"	KT Tunstall, Martin Terefe
2022	KT Tunstall	Nut	"Dear Shadow"	KT Tunstall
2023	S Club	Non-album single	"These Are the Days"	Simon Ellis, Johanne Ellis

== Song awards ==
- Ivor Novello Awards 2002 – PRS Most Performed Work – "Can't Get You Out of My Head"
- Ivor Novello Awards 2002 – International Hit of the Year – "Can't Get You Out of My Head"
- Ivor Novello Awards 2002 – Ivors Dance Award – "Can't Get You Out of My Head"
- Ivor Novello Awards 2003 – Best-selling UK single – "Anything is Possible"
- Grammy Awards 2004 – Best Dance Recording – "Come into my World"
- Grammy Awards 2005 – Best Dance Recording – "Toxic"
- ASCAP Awards 2005 – Most Performed Song – "Toxic"
- Ivor Novello Awards 2005 – PRS Most Performed Work – "Toxic"
- UK Music Industry Woman of The Year Award (2006)
- ASCAP Awards 2007 – TV Theme – American Idol
- Honorary Doctorate of Music, University of East Anglia (2012)
- Grammy Awards 2016 – Best Dance Recording – "Runaway (U & I)" (Nominated)
