= Girls on Boys =

Promotional single by Galantis and Rozes

from the album The Aviary
- Released: 1 September 2017
- Genre: Dance-pop
- Length: 2:59
- Label: Atlantic; WEA
- Songwriters: Henrik Jonback; Toby Gad; Rasmus Cantoreggi; Christian Karlsson; Josh Cumbee; Jimmy Koitzsch; Linus Eklöw; Afshin Salmani; Elizabeth Mencel
- Producers: Afsheen; Josh Cumbee; Toby Gad; Galantis

"Girls on Boys" is a song by Swedish electronic dance music production duo Galantis and American singer-songwriter Rozes. It was written by Rozes, Henrik Jonback, Rasmus Cantoreggi, Svidden, Afshin Salmani, Galantis, Toby Gad and Josh Cumbee, with production handled by the latter three and Afsheen. The song was released via Atlantic Records and WEA International on 1 September 2017, as the second promotional single from the duo's second studio album, The Aviary (2017).

== Background ==
Galantis said of the song in a press release: "It's a style of songwriting that's been a part of Galantis from the start, but we never really had the chance to show you. We had our battles with this one. It took a million turns, but it also forced us to go somewhere we haven't been before, and we're stoked to be sharing." Rozes explained the inspiration behind the song, saying:

"'Girls On Boys' is about attempting to fix a broken heart with a night of flashy distractions, which is only a short-term remedy. One of my co-writers went through a break-up and we were talking about how he was coping, which was mostly by keeping busy, hanging out with friends, and partying like everything was fine."

She furthered: "The upbeat vibe of the song masks the darker lyrics, which reveal that the money, diamonds and champagne won't fix the feeling of missing the person you love and feeling alone." Galantis also confirmed the dates for The Aviary tour in Autumn in celebration of the single release.

== Critical reception ==
Kat Bein of Billboard deemed the song a "latest chipmunk-squeal feel-good anthem ready to heat up your last days of summer". He felt Rozes gave "powerful, raspy performance well-balanced against the shiny synths and future pop production". Jeffrey Yau of Your EDM felt the chorus "livens up" the song "with the melodic yet euphoric elements that have come to define Galantis", and the drop, which he described as "light and fluffy", stands out as an example of the duo's "pop-making prowess". Erik of EDM Sauce thinks that the duo "changes things up quite a bit" with this song, and "continued to demonstrate they know what they are doing production wise". He regarded the song as a combination of "future, trap, tropical and just plain electro elements" into "a gorgeous production". Mike Wass of Idolator believed that the song is "their most accessible and euphoric offering since 'No Money'".

== Remixes ==
Two months later after the single released, a remix EP came out exclusively on Beatport that contained a VIP mix by Galantis & DJ B-Sights, a remix by DJ Kaidro, a remix by signed Armada Music artist Dave Winnel (producer), & a remix by DJ Gregor Salto.

== Credits and personnel ==
Credits adapted from Tidal.

- Galantis – songwriting, production, mixing, programming, arranging
- Rozes – songwriting, vocals
- Henrik Jonback – songwriting
- Toby Gad – songwriting, production, programming, arranging
- Rasmus Cantoreggi – songwriting
- Josh Cumbee – songwriting, production, programming, arranging
- Svidden – songwriting
- Afshin Salmani – songwriting
- Elizaberh Mencel – songwriting
- Afsheen – production, programming, arranging
- Cass Irvine – mastering engineering
- Niklas Flyckt – mixing

== Charts ==
Chart (2017)	Peak position
Australia (ARIA)	96
New Zealand Heatseekers (RMNZ)	3
Sweden Heatseekers (Sverigetopplistan)	3
US Hot Dance/Electronic Songs (Billboard)	32
