= Pillow fight (disambiguation) =

A pillow fight is a common game using pillows as weapons.

Pillow fight may also refer to:

- Pillow Fight (Galantis song), 2016
- Pillow Fight (Tinashe song), 2026
- Pillow Fight, a song by James Marriott from the album Don't Tell the Dog
- Pillow Fight, a song by Iggy Azalea from the album The End of an Era
