= Hunter (Galantis song) =

Single by Galantis

from the album The Aviary
- Released: 5 May 2017
- Length: 3:04
- Label: Atlantic; WMG
- Songwriter(s): Ki Fitzgerald; Henrik Jonback; Linus Eklöw; Josh Wilkinson; Jimmy Koitzsch; Christian Karlsson; Hannah Wilson
- Producer(s): Jimmy Koitzsch; Henrik Jonback; Galantis; Ki Fitzgerald (co.); Josh Wilkinson (co.)

Galantis singles chronology
"Rich Boy" (2017)	"Hunter" (2017)	"Tell Me You Love Me" (2017)

Music video
- "Hunter" on YouTube

"Hunter" is a song by Swedish electronic music duo Galantis, released on May 5, 2017, via Atlantic Recording in the United States and WEA International elsewhere around the globe. It was written by Josh Wilkinson, Hannah Wilson, Ki Fitzgerald, Henrik Jonback, Jimmy Koitzsch and Galantis, with production handled by the latter three.

== Background ==
Galantis celebrated the release of "Hunter" with a Facebook Live event, in which they acknowledged their fans and answered questions submitted by viewers. “Hunter” was played in the background throughout the segment.

The duo appeared on Last Call with Carson Daly in May 2017 to perform "Hunter", as well as "No Money" and "Peanut Butter Jelly".

== Music video ==
The music video, which was directed by Ben Fee, premiered on the duo's Vevo account on 29 June 2017. The video features Galantis' mascot, the Seafox, accompanied by a host of ornately dressed forest creatures on the hunt for a magical remedy.

== Track listing ==
Digital download
No.	Title	Length
1.	"Hunter"	3:04

Digital download – Remixes EP
No.	Title	Length
1.	"Hunter" (NGHTMRE and Rickyxsan Remix)	2:28
2.	"Hunter" (Henry Fong Remix)	3:01
3.	"Hunter" (Mike Williams Remix)	3:50
4.	"Hunter" (Made in June Remix)	3:14
5.	"Hunter" (Galantis and Misha K VIP Mix)	2:54

Digital download - Beatport exclusive
No.	Title	Length
1.	"Hunter" (Olin Batista Remix)	3:55
2.	"Hunter" (David Puentez Remix)	4:13
3.	"Hunter" (ALIGEE Remix)	3:09

== Credits and personnel ==
Credits adapted from Tidal.

- Galantis – composing, producing, mixing, programming, arranging
- Ki Fitzgerald – composing, co-producing, programming
- Henrik Jonback – composing, producing, arranging
- Josh Wilkinson – composing, co-producing, programming
- Jimmy Koitzsch – composing, producing, arranging
- Hannah Wilson – composing, vocals
- Cass Irvine – mastering engineering
- Niklas Flyckt – mixing

== Charts ==
=== Weekly charts ===
Chart (2017)	Peak position
Austria (Ö3 Austria Top 40)	37
Czech Republic (Rádio – Top 100)	9
Czech Republic (Singles Digitál Top 100)	72
Germany (GfK)	35
Netherlands (Dutch Top 40)	34
Netherlands (Single Top 100)	68
New Zealand Heatseekers (RMNZ)	9
Norway (VG-lista)	16
Scotland (OCC)	43
Slovakia (Singles Digitál Top 100)	71
Sweden (Sverigetopplistan)	24
Switzerland (Schweizer Hitparade)	93
US Hot Dance/Electronic Songs (Billboard)	21

=== Year-end charts ===
Chart (2017)	Position
Sweden (Sverigetopplistan)	78
US Hot Dance/Electronic Songs (Billboard)	90

== Certifications ==
Region	Certification	Certified units/sales
Germany (BVMI)	Gold	200,000^{‡}
^{‡} Sales+streaming figures based on certification alone.

== Release history ==
Region	Date	Format	Version	Label	Ref.
United States	5 May 2017	Digital download	Original	Atlantic	
United States	16 July 2017	Digital download	Remixes EP	Atlantic	
