= Rich Boy (song) =

Single by Galantis

from the album The Aviary
- Released: 17 February 2017
- Genre: Tropical house
- Length: 3:03
- Label: Big Beat; WMG
- Songwriters: Linus Eklow; Chiara Hunter; Henrik Jonback; Jimmy "Svidden" Koitzsch; Karen Poole; Fridolin Walcher
- Producers: Galantis; Svidden; Jonback; Freedo

Galantis singles chronology
"Pillow Fight" (2016)	"Rich Boy" (2017)	"Hunter" (2017)

"Rich Boy" is a song by Swedish electronic music duo Galantis, featuring uncredited vocals from 8-year-old girl Ava Rifat and Australian singer-songwriter Chiara Hunter which makes them both sing the same over and over. It was released on 17 February 2017.

== Track listing ==
Digital download
No.	Title	Length
1.	"Rich Boy"	3:03

Digital download – remixes EP
No.	Title	Length
1.	"Rich Boy" (Quintino Remix)	3:37
2.	"Rich Boy" (Felix Cartal Remix)	3:04
3.	"Rich Boy" (Bali Bandits Remix)	2:58
4.	"Rich Boy" (Zack Martino Remix)	2:35
5.	"Rich Boy" (Said the Sky Remix)	2:58

== Charts ==
Chart (2017)	Peak position
Mexico Airplay (Billboard)	42
Scottish Singles Sales (Official Charts)	20
Sweden Heatseeker (Sverigetopplistan)	13
UK Singles (Official Charts)	60
US Hot Dance/Electronic Songs (Billboard)	31

== Release history ==
Region	Date	Format
United States	17 February 2017	Digital download
United Kingdom	17 February 2017	Digital download
