= Rozes (musician) =

American singer (born 1993)

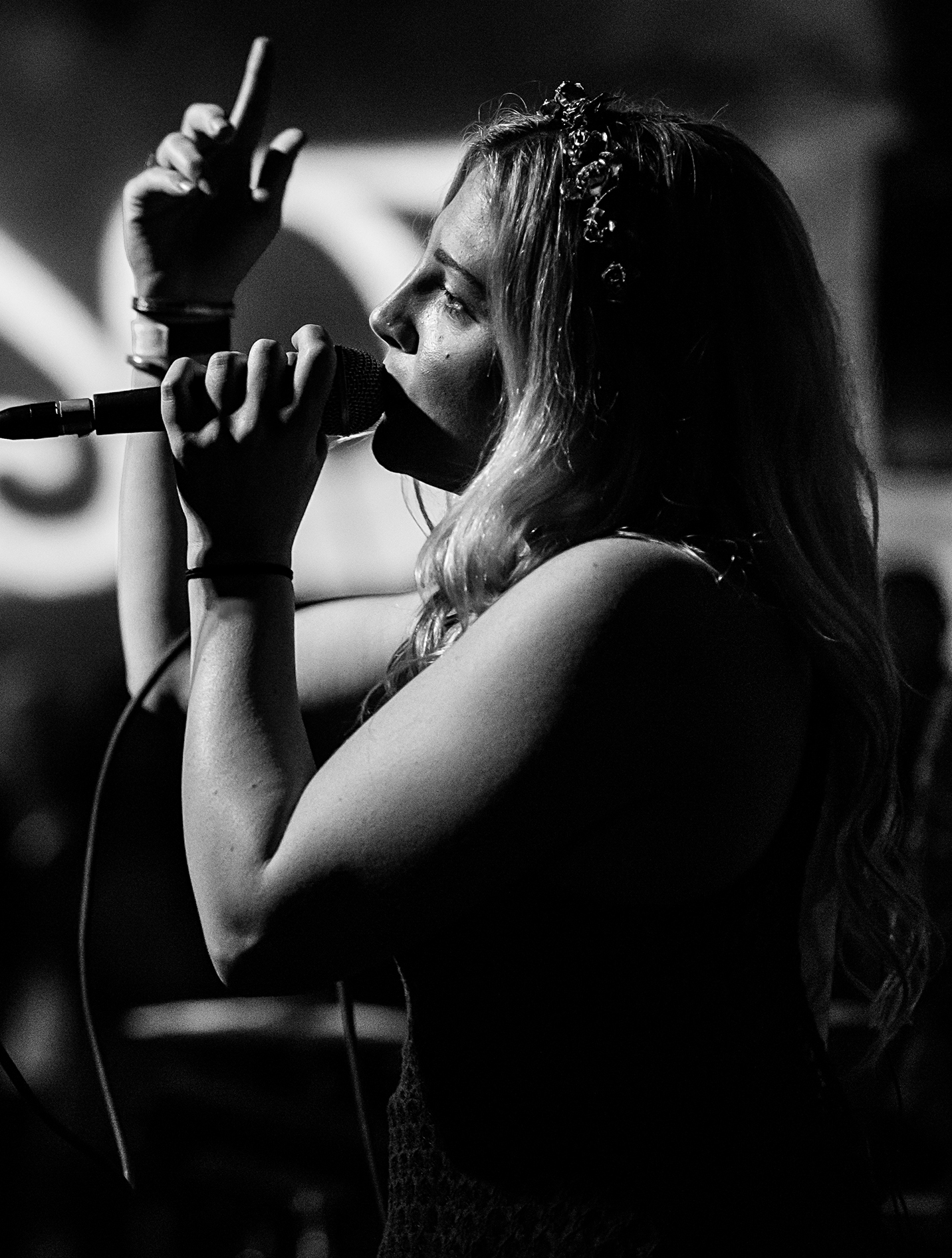
- Rozes performing in 2016

Background information
- Born: Elizabeth Mencel; April 14, 1993 (age 33); Montgomeryville, Pennsylvania, U.S.
- Genres: Pop; dance; EDM
- Occupations: Musician; singer; songwriter
- Instrument: Vocals
- Years active: 2014–present
- Website: www.rozessounds.com

Elizabeth McQuiston (née Mencel; born April 14, 1993), known professionally as Rozes (stylized in all capitals or as R O Z E S), is an American musician, singer and songwriter from Montgomeryville, Pennsylvania. She is best known for her 2015 collaboration, "Roses", with duo The Chainsmokers. She also featured in Galantis' song "Girls on Boys".

== Early life and education ==
A native of Montgomeryville, Pennsylvania, McQuiston grew up in a gospel-influenced home and first studied piano at age six. Eventually she also became proficient in clarinet, saxophone, guitar, violin, flute, and trumpet.

McQuiston first started her musical career at North Penn High School in Montgomery County, Pennsylvania. Soon after, she earned an associate degree from Montgomery County Community College and then transferred to Temple University in Philadelphia. After one year at Temple, McQuiston chose to pursue music as a full-time career and left college.

== Career ==
In October 2014, under her professional moniker Rozes, McQuiston was featured on and wrote Just a Gent's "Limelight", which reached #1 on Hype Machine and has over 2 million plays on SoundCloud.

McQuiston was featured on The Chainsmokers' 2015 hit, "Roses", which she co-wrote with Andrew Taggart of The Chainsmokers. Released on June 16, 2015, the single peaked at number six on the Billboard Hot 100, as well as number one on Billboard's Hot Dance/Electronic Songs chart for the week of January 9, 2016.

McQuiston's debut EP, Burn Wild, was released on February 14, 2016.

In 2017, McQuiston signed a deal with Photo Finish Records, where she released singles "Where Would We Be" (with Nicky Romero), "Canyons", and "Famous". Her debut EP under Photo Finish "i don't know where i'm going, but i'm on my way" was released on August 24, 2018.

In 2019, McQuiston released her track "Halfway There", which became the official anthem to the 2019 Women's March on NYC via The Women's March Alliance.

McQuiston released her second album with Photo Finish Records in 2020 named "Crazy", which features a duet with Mat Kearney.

== Discography ==
=== Extended plays ===
Title	Details
Burn Wild	Released: February 14, 2016; Label: Self-released; Format: Digital download
I Don't Know Where I'm Going, but I'm on My Way	Released: August 24, 2018; Label: Photo Finish Records; Format: Digital download
A Very Rozes Christmas	Released: November 30, 2018; Label: Photo Finish Records; Format: Digital download

=== Singles ===
==== As lead artist ====
Year	Title	Peak chart positions	Album
Year	Title	US Dance	Album
2015	"R U Mine"	—	Burn Wild
2015	"In n Out"	—	Burn Wild
2016	"Fragile"	—	Burn Wild
2016	"Hangin' On"	—	Non-album singles
2016	"Under the Grave"	—	Non-album singles
2017	"Matches" (with Cash Cash)	38	Say It Like You Feel It
2017	"Canyons"	—	I Don't Know Where I'm Going, but I'm on My Way
2017	"Famous"	—	I Don't Know Where I'm Going, but I'm on My Way
2018	"Where Would We Be" (with Nicky Romero)	—	I Don't Know Where I'm Going, but I'm on My Way
2018	"Demons" (with Felix Snow)	—	Non-album singles
2018	"Mean to Me" (with Stayloose)	—	Non-album singles
2019	"Halfway There"	—	TBA
2019	"Call Me"	—	TBA
2019	"Walls" (with Mat Kearney)	—	TBA
2021	"Out Loud (with Fairlane (Artist) and JT Roach)	—	Non-album single
"—" denotes a single that did not chart or was not released.

==== As a featured artist ====
Year	Title	Peak chart positions										Certifications	Album
Year	Title	US	US Elec.	AUS	CAN	DEN	FIN	NL	NOR	SWE	UK	Certifications	Album
2014	"Limelight" (Just a Gent featuring Rozes)	—	—	—	—	—	—	—	—	—	—		Non-album single
2015	"Roses" (The Chainsmokers featuring Rozes)	6	1	5	6	30	18	28	8	13	16	RIAA: 8× Platinum; ARIA: 4× Platinum; BPI: Platinum; BRMA: Gold; FIMI: 2× Platinum; GLF: 4× Platinum; IFPI DEN: Platinum; IFPI NOR: Platinum; MC: 5× Platinum; RMNZ: 5× Platinum	Bouquet
2016	"All of Me" (Big Gigantic featuring Logic and Rozes)	—	19	—	—	—	—	—	—	—	—		Brighter Future
2019	"One Day" (Sam Feldt and Yves V featuring Rozes)	—	—	—	—	—	—	—	—	—	—		Non-album single
2019	"Chains" (Fractures featuring Rozes)	—	—	—	—	—	—	—	—	—	—		TBA
2020	"Be Somebody” (Neffex featuring Rozes)	—	—	—	—	—	—	—	—	—	—		New Beginnings
"—" denotes a single that did not chart or was not released.

==== Promotional singles ====
Year	Title	Peak chart positions			Album
Year	Title	SWE Heat.	AUS	US Dance	Album
2017	"Girls on Boys" (with Galantis)	3	96	32	The Aviary
