= Dandelion (Galantis and Jvke song) =

Single by Galantis and Jvke
- Released: 8 January 2021
- Genre: Pop
- Length: 2:20
- Label: Big Beat
- Songwriters: Christian Karlsson; Jake Lawson; Zac Lawson
- Producers: Christian Karlsson; Jvke; Zac Lawson

Galantis singles chronology
"Tu Tu Tu (That's Why We)" (2020)	"Dandelion" (2021)	"The Best" (2021)

Jvke singles chronology
"Upside Down" (2020)	"Dandelion" (2021)	"This Is What Falling in Love Feels Like" (2021)

"Dandelion" is a song by Swedish DJ duo Galantis and American singer, songwriter and producer Jvke. It was released on 8 January 2021 via Big Beat Records. It describes "a story of fleeting love".

== Background ==
Galantis live-streamed on Instagram with Jvke, and announced the collaboration. In an interview, Galantis said the song "came about after Jvke requested to hop on a Galantis Instagram Live. I recognized him from TikTok and I asked him what he was up to. He said he was working on an idea for a song and started to sing it for me. I really loved the vibe, and he asked if I was down to work on it together. We ended up sending it back and forth, and it became this natural organic collaboration with no real plan or goal. The past year has really changed how we make music and work with other artists, with negative circumstances actually opening doors to unlikely opportunities."

== Composition ==
The song is written in the key of G major, with a tempo of 118 beats per minute.

== Critical reception ==
Niko Sani of edm.com described that the song "[is] a hypnotic, pop-infused anthem that's reminiscent of what longtime listeners fell in love with on the duo's debut album Pharmacy. Lewis Partington of We Rave You praised: "The low-key house-infused track is a perfect winter warmer to bring a bit of heat into a cold morning."

== Lyric video ==
An accompanying lyric video was released on 9 January 2021. It shows series of "pastel flowers and backdrops", Jvke "dances in various scenes throughout the video."

== Charts ==
=== Weekly charts ===
Weekly chart performance for "Dandelion"
Chart (2021)	Peak position
New Zealand Hot Singles (RMNZ)	31
Sweden Heatseeker (Sverigetopplistan)	7
US Hot Dance/Electronic Songs (Billboard)	19

=== Year-end charts ===
Year-end chart performance for "Dandelion"
Chart (2021)	Position
US Hot Dance/Electronic Songs (Billboard)	40

== Release history ==
Release history for "Dandelion"
Region	Date	Format	Label	Ref.
Various	8 January 2021	Digital download; streaming	Big Beat	
