= Make Me Feel (Galantis and East & Young song) =

Single by Galantis and East & Young

from the album XOXO (Music from the Netflix Original Film)
- Released: 11 August 2016
- Length: 3:28
- Label: Big Beat; WMG
- Songwriters: Christian Karlsson; Henrik Jonback; Ivo de Jong; Jimmy Koitzsch; Jon Hume; Linus Eklow; Marc Van Oosterbaan; Michiel Jenner
- Producers: Svidden; East & Young; Galantis; Jonback; Hume

Galantis and East & Young singles chronology
"No Money" (2016)	"Make Me Feel" (2016)	"Love on Me" (2016)

"Make Me Feel" is a collaborative single, written and performed by Galantis and East & Young. It was released on 11 August 2016, through Big Beat Records as the soundtrack to the 2016 film XOXO.

== Charts ==
Chart performance for "Make Me Feel"
Chart (2016)	Peak position
Australia (ARIA)	99
Sweden Heatseeker (Sverigetopplistan)	9
