= True Feeling =

Promotional single by Galantis

from the album The Aviary
- Released: 12 July 2017
- Genre: Dance; pop; EDM
- Length: 3:58
- Label: Atlantic; WEA
- Songwriter(s): Candy Shields; Stephen Wrabel; Christian 'Bloodshy' Karlsson; Jimmy 'Svidden' Koitzsch; Linus 'Style Of Eye' Eklöw; Henrik Jonback
- Producer(s): Svidden; Galantis; Henrik Jonback

Music video
- "True Feeling" on YouTube

"True Feeling" is a song by Swedish electronic dance music duo Galantis. It was written by Candy Shields, Stephen Wrabel, Jimmy 'Svidden' Koitzsch, Galantis and Henrik Jonback, with production handled by the latter three, and Wrabel on vocals. The song was released through Atlantic Records and WEA International on 12 July 2017, accompanied by the announcement of the duo's second studio album, The Aviary.

== Background ==
On 11 July 2017, Galantis shared a preview of "True Feeling" on social media, alongside the announcement of the upcoming studio album's title and the single's release date.

== Music video ==
The music video was directed by Dalton Campbell. It featured footage of Galantis on tour and fan testimonials. Natalie Rao of This Song Is Sick described the video as "equally fun-loving" as the song.

== Critical reception ==
David Rishty of Billboard magazine wrote: "In true Galantis fashion, their latest output embraces warm pads, bright percussion and soaring vocals that confidently skate between dance and pop." Natalie Rao of This Song Is Sick wrote: "'True Feeling' draws you in from the first note with a subdued, tropical-style lead-in. The lyrics pair well with the steady build of the production, breaking into a lighthearted drop that ties together tropical notes, upbeat percussion and smooth vocals." Matthew Meadow of YourEDM regarded the song as "a bouncy and vocal-driven melody" and is "EDM pop at its purest". Steph Evans of Earmilk described the song as "infectious". Lisa-sun Nguyen of EDM Identity wrote: "The track captures the essence of Galantis with crisp vocals and a fun-loving sound." Rajrishi Murthi of the Bangin Beats wrote: "Mesmerizing male vocals take over the proceedings before being joined by airy chords which dominate the breaks. With a subtle percussive work on offer, the buildup leaves us to the climax with a playful, bouncy lead fit for the ongoing summer season."

== Track listing ==
Digital download
No.	Title	Length
1.	"True Feeling"	3:58

Digital download – Galantis and shndō VIP Mix
No.	Title	Length
1.	"True Feeling" (Galantis and shndō VIP Mix)	3:25

== Credits and personnel ==
Credits adapted from Tidal.

- Galantis – composing, producing, mixing, arranging
- Candy Shields – composing
- Wrabel – composing, vocals
- Svidden – composing, producing, arranging
- Henrik Jonback – composing, producing, arranging
- Niklas Flyckt – mixing

== Charts ==
Chart (2017)	Peak position
Scotland (OCC)	51
Sweden Heatseeker (Sverigetopplistan)	1
US Hot Dance/Electronic Songs (Billboard)	25

== Release history ==
Region	Date	Format	Version	Label	Ref.
Various	12 July 2017	Digital download	Original	Atlantic; WEA	
Various	21 July 2017	Digital download	Galantis and shndō VIP Mix	Atlantic; WEA	
