= Love on Me =

Single by Galantis featuring Hook n Sling and Laura White

from the album The Aviary
- Released: 30 September 2016
- Genre: Dance-pop
- Length: 3:25
- Label: Big Beat; WMG
- Songwriters: Richard Boardman; Sarah Blanchard; Laura White; Linus Eklöw; Christian Karlsson; Jimmy Koitzsch; Henrik Jonback; Anthony Maniscalco
- Producers: Galantis; Hook n Sling; Svidden; Jonback

Galantis singles chronology
"Make Me Feel" (2016)	"Love on Me" (2016)	"Pillow Fight" (2016)

Hook n Sling singles chronology
"Break Yourself" (2015)	"Love on Me" (2016)	"If You're Hearing This" (2017)

"Love on Me" is a song by Swedish electronic music duo Galantis and Australian DJ Hook n Sling, featuring uncredited vocals of English singer-songwriter Laura White. It was released on 30 September 2016.

== Music video ==
A music video, directed by Dano Cerny, was released to YouTube on 4 October 2016. It was filmed at the Buddhist temples Wat Tham Sue (วัดถ้ำเสือ; [th]) and Wat Tham Khao Noi (วัดถ้ำเขาน้อย; [th]) in Kanchanaburi province, Thailand and features choreographers dressed up as Tibetan monks in bright-colored robes performing choreographed dance sequences.

== Track listing ==
Digital Download
No.	Title	Length
1.	"Love On Me"	3:25

Digital Download – Remixes EP
No.	Title	Length
1.	"Love On Me" (Ookay Remix)	3:47
2.	"Love On Me" (CID Remix)	3:10
3.	"Love On Me" (Madison Mars Remix)	3:08
4.	"Love On Me" (Alex Metric Remix)	4:47
5.	"Love On Me" (Peter Bjorn and John Remix)	3:03

Digital Download - Beatport exclusive
No.	Title	Length
1.	"Love On Me" (Galantis & Misha K VIP Mix)	4:30

== Charts ==
=== Weekly charts ===
Chart (2016–17)	Peak position
Australia (ARIA)	69
Austria (Ö3 Austria Top 40)	46
Belgium (Ultratip Bubbling Under Flanders)	11
Belgium (Ultratop 50 Wallonia)	34
Czech Republic Airplay (ČNS IFPI)	77
Czech Republic Singles Digital (ČNS IFPI)	68
Germany (GfK)	39
Ireland (IRMA)	19
Netherlands (Dutch Top 40)	32
Netherlands (Single Top 100)	29
New Zealand Heatseekers (RMNZ)	10
Poland Airplay (ZPAV)	45
Scottish Singles Sales (Official Charts)	9
Slovakia Airplay (ČNS IFPI)	56
Slovakia Singles Digital (ČNS IFPI)	65
Sweden (Sverigetopplistan)	27
Switzerland (Schweizer Hitparade)	64
UK Singles (Official Charts)	16
UK Dance (Official Charts)	4
US Hot Dance/Electronic Songs (Billboard)	18

=== Year-end charts ===
Chart (2016)	Position
US Hot Dance/Electronic Songs (Billboard)	99
Chart (2017)	Position
US Hot Dance/Electronic Songs (Billboard)	89

== Certifications ==
Region	Certification	Certified units/sales
Canada (Music Canada)	Platinum	80,000^{‡}
Germany (BVMI)	Gold	200,000^{‡}
Italy (FIMI)	Platinum	50,000^{‡}
New Zealand (RMNZ)	2× Platinum	60,000^{‡}
United Kingdom (BPI)	Platinum	600,000^{‡}
^{‡} Sales+streaming figures based on certification alone.
