= The Aviary (album) =

Studio album by Galantis
- Released: 15 September 2017
- Recorded: 2016–2017
- Genre: EDM
- Length: 40:20
- Label: Big Beat (Atlantic)
- Producers: Galantis; Svidden; Henrik Jonback; Hook n Sling; Digital Farm Animals; Andrew Bullimore; Ki Fitzgerald; Joshua Wilkinson; Toby Gad; AFSHeeN; Josh Cumbee; Poo Bear; Throttle; Ricky Reed

Galantis chronology
Pharmacy (2015)	The Aviary (2017)	Church (2020)

Singles from The Aviary
- 1. "No Money" Released: 31 March 2016; 2. "Love on Me" Released: 30 September 2016; 3. "Pillow Fight" Released: 15 December 2016; 4. "Rich Boy" Released: 17 February 2017; 5. "Hunter" Released: 5 May 2017; 6. "Tell Me You Love Me" Released: 15 September 2017

The Aviary is the second studio album by Swedish electronic dance music act Galantis. It was released on 15 September 2017 through Big Beat Records and Atlantic Records, and features appearances from Throttle, Reece Bullimore, Hook n Sling, ROZES, Hannah Wilson and Wrabel.

On 16 February 2017, the duo released the single "Rich Boy" along with a lyric video directed by We Wrk Wknds. Along with the announcement of the album, it was also announced that the single "Rich Boy" would be excluded from the track list of the album. The album was made available for pre-order on 12 July 2017.

== Singles ==
On 1 April 2016, the pair released the single "No Money", which became their first single to debut on the US Billboard Hot 100. On 5 August 2016, they released the standalone single "Make Me Feel" for the soundtrack to Netflix's original film, XOXO.

On 30 September 2016, Galantis and Hook n Sling released the collaborative single "Love on Me" followed by a music video for the track on 4 October 2016, directed by Dano Cerny. On 15 December 2016, they released a lyric video for "Pillow Fight", which the band has said "brings back the original Galantis heart and roots". On 5 May 2017, the duo released the single "Hunter", to be accompanied by a music video which has already been filmed.

On 8 December 2017, Galantis released "Tell Me You Love Me" as the fifth and final single from the album.

=== Promotional singles ===
On 12 July 2017, it was announced on social media that Galantis' second studio album would be titled The Aviary, accompanied by the release of the promotional single titled "True Feeling". The track "Girls on Boys", a collaboration with American singer-songwriter Rozes, was released as the second promotional single on 1 September 2017 and was revealed on 24 August 2017.

== Track listing ==
The Aviary track listing
No.	Title	Writer(s)	Producer(s)	Length
1.	"True Feeling"	Stephen Wrabel; Candy Shields; Christian Karlsson; Jimmy Koitzsch; Henrik Jonback; Linus Eklöw	Galantis; Svidden; Jonback	3:58
2.	"Hey Alligator"	Bonnie McKee; Johnnie Newman; Karlsson; Koitzsch; Jonback; Eklöw	Galantis; Svidden; Jonback	3:29
3.	"Girls on Boys" (with Rozes)	Josh Cumbee; Elizabeth Mencel; Toby Gad; Karlsson; Koitzsch; Jonback; Eklöw; Rasmus Cantoreggi; Afshin Salmani	Galantis; Gad; AFSHeeN; Cumbee	2:59
4.	"Salvage (Up All Night)" (featuring Poo Bear)	Jason Boyd; Karlsson; Koitzsch; Jonback; Eklöw	Galantis; Svidden; Jonback; Poo Bear^{[c]}	3:17
5.	"Tell Me You Love Me" (with Throttle)	Sarah Aarons; Robert Michael Bergin; Eddie Jenkins; Karlsson; Koitzsch; Jonback; Eklöw	Galantis; Throttle; Svidden; Jonback	3:10
6.	"Hello"	Ross Golan; Jacob Kasher Hindlin; Ammar Malik; Eric Frederic; Karlsson; Koitzsch; Jonback; Eklöw	Galantis; Svidden; Jonback	3:43
7.	"Hunter"	Joshua Wilkinson; Ki Fitzgerald; Hannah Wilson; Karlsson; Koitzsch; Jonback; Eklöw	Galantis; Svidden; Jonback; Wilkinson^{[c]}; KiFi^{[c]}	3:04
8.	"Written in the Scars" (featuring Wrabel)	Wrabel; Andrew Jackson; Drew Pearson; Karlsson; Koitzsch; Jonback; Eklöw	Galantis; Svidden; Jonback; Pearson^{[c]}	3:23
9.	"Call Me Home"	Sam Martin; Karlsson; Koitzsch; Jonback; Eklöw	Galantis; Svidden; Jonback; Martin^{[a]}	3:25
10.	"Love on Me" (with Hook n Sling)	Karlsson; Eklöw; Koitzsch; Jonback; Anthony Maniscalco; Richard Boardman; Sarah Blanchard; Laura White	Galantis; Hook N Sling; Svidden; Jonback	3:25
11.	"Pillow Fight"	Karlsson; Eklöw; Koitzsch; Jonback; Golan	Galantis; Svidden; Jonback	3:17
12.	"No Money"	Karlsson; Eklöw; Koitzsch; Jonback; Nicholas Gale; Andrew Bullimore	Galantis; Svidden; Jonback; Digital Farm Animals^{[a]}; BullySongs^{[v]}	3:10

The Aviary – Japanese edition (bonus tracks)
No.	Title	Writer(s)	Producer(s)	Length
13.	"Love on Me" (CID remix; with Hook N Sling)	Boardman; Blanchard; White; Dennis; Eklöw; Karlsson; Koitzsch; Jonback; Hook N Sling	Galantis; Hook N Sling; Svidden; Jonback; CID^{[r]}
14.	"Hunter" (Henry Fong remix)	Karlsson; Koitzsch; Wilkinson; Fitzgerald; Jonback	Galantis; Svidden; Jonback; Wilkinson^{[c]}; KiFi^{[c]}; Henry Fong^{[r]}
15.	"No Money" (Dillon Francis remix)	Karlsson; Eklöw; Koitzsch; Jonback; Bullimore; Gale	Galantis; Svidden; Jonback; Digital Farm Animals^{[a]}; BullySongs^{[v]}; Dillon Francis^{[r]}

Notes

- ^{[c]} signifies a co-producer
- ^{[a]} signifies an additional producer
- ^{[v]} signifies a vocal producer
- ^{[r]} signifies a remix producer
- "True Feeling" features lead vocals from Wrabel
- "Hey Alligator" features vocals from Bonnie McKee
- "Tell Me You Love Me" features vocals from Sarah Aarons
- "Hello" features vocals from Leon Jean Marie & Ross Golan
- "Hunter" features lead vocals from Hannah Wilson
- "Call Me Home" features vocals from Sam Martin
- "Love on Me" features vocals from Laura White
- "Pillow Fight" features vocals from Ross Golan & Matthew Koma
- "No Money" features vocals from Reece Bullimore
- "Rich Boy" features vocals from Chiara Hunter

== Charts ==
Chart performance for The Aviary
Chart (2017)	Peak position
Australian Albums (ARIA)	40
Canadian Albums (Billboard)	47
Dutch Albums (Album Top 100)	135
Japanese Albums (Oricon)	105
New Zealand Heatseeker Albums (RMNZ)	4
UK Albums (Official Charts)	58
US Billboard 200	102
US Top Dance Albums (Billboard)	4

== Certifications ==
Certifications for The Aviary
Region	Certification	Certified units/sales
Canada (Music Canada)	Gold	40,000^{‡}
New Zealand (RMNZ)	Gold	7,500^{‡}
^{‡} Sales+streaming figures based on certification alone.
