= Pillow Fight (Galantis song) =

Single by Galantis

from the album The Aviary
- Released: 15 December 2016
- Genre: Tropical house
- Length: 3:17
- Label: Atlantic; WMG
- Songwriters: Christian Karlsson; Jimmy Koitzsch; Linus Eklow; Ross Golan; Henrik Jonback
- Producers: Galantis; Koitzsch; Jonback

Galantis singles chronology
"Love on Me" (2016)	"Pillow Fight" (2016)	"Rich Boy" (2017)

Music video
- "Pillow Fight" on YouTube

"Pillow Fight" is a song by Swedish electronic music duo Galantis. Written by Ross Golan, Galantis, Jimmy Koitzsch and Henrik Jonback, with production handled by the latter three, it was released on 15 December 2016 via Atlantic and WMG.

== Background ==
The track was first unveiled during Galantis' performance in San Jose, as part of their California College tour.

"In lots of ways 'Pillow Fight' brings back the original Galantis heart and roots, and reminds us why we started this project," Galantis said in a press release. "Launch yourself in every wave, live and breathe the full-throttle mentality, we'll go to sleep tomorrow."

On 13 January, they released a VIP mix of the track with American DJ and producer CID.

== Track listing ==
Digital download
No.	Title	Length
1.	"Pillow Fight"	3:17

Digital download – Galantis and CID VIP Mix
No.	Title	Length
1.	"Pillow Fight" (Galantis and CID VIP Mix)	4:12

== Charts ==
Chart (2017)	Peak position
US Hot Dance/Electronic Songs (Billboard)	19

== Release history ==
Region	Date	Format	Label	Ref.
United States	15 December 2016	Digital download	Atlantic	
Various	15 December 2016	Digital download	WMG	
United States	13 January 2017	Digital download – Galantis and CID VIP Mix	Atlantic	
Various	13 January 2017	Digital download – Galantis and CID VIP Mix	WMG	
