= No Money (song) =

Single by Galantis

from the album The Aviary
- Released: 31 March 2016
- Genre: Progressive house; dance-pop
- Length: 3:09
- Label: Big Beat (Atlantic)
- Songwriters: Christian Karlsson; Linus Eklöw; Jimmy Koitzsch; Henrik Jonback; Andrew Bullimore; Nicholas Gale
- Producers: Galantis; Svidden; Jonback; Digital Farm Animals; Bullimore

Galantis singles chronology
"Louder Harder Better" (2016)	"No Money" (2016)	"Make Me Feel" (2016)

Music video
- "No Money" on YouTube

"No Money" is a song by Swedish electronic music duo Galantis. It was released on 31 March 2016 as the lead single from their second studio album, The Aviary (2017). The song features uncredited vocals from Reece Bullimore, son of Beatbullyz's Andrew Bullimore and is written by Digital Farm Animals and Andrew Bullimore. It samples the amen break, most prominently at 1:44. It was commercially successful, peaking at number one in Norway and reaching the top ten in Sweden, the United Kingdom, Ireland, Australia, Austria, the Netherlands and Denmark. Additionally, it became their first single to chart on the US Billboard Hot 100 in the United States, peaking at number 88.

== Music video ==
The video starts with a young girl sewing a picture of the Galantis' Seafox in a jacket while humming the song. She paints her nose and wears the jacket and leaves the house through the window with her face painted like an animal. Other children walk with their face painted to an abandoned building. The girl then slowly makes her way to the building, while more children with their face painted join her. The girl then enters the building and confronts another girl with her face painted. The two then have a dance-off, with the first girl winning while the other falls and disappears. The video features product placement by Converse All-Star shoes.

== Track listing ==
Digital download
No.	Title	Length
1.	"No Money"	3:09

Digital download – Remixes
No.	Title	Length
1.	"No Money" (Moti Remix)	4:21
2.	"No Money" (Dillon Francis Remix)	4:41
3.	"No Money" (Lucky Charmes Remix)	4:03

Digital download – Remixes, Pt. 2
No.	Title	Length
1.	"No Money" (Curbi Remix)	3:41
2.	"No Money" (Wuki Remix)	3:15
3.	"No Money" (Chet Porter Remix)	3:04
4.	"No Money" (Miska K Remix)	4:01

== Charts ==
=== Weekly charts ===
Chart (2016–17)	Peak position
Australia (ARIA)	6
Austria (Ö3 Austria Top 40)	9
Belgium (Ultratop 50 Flanders)	22
Belgium Dance (Ultratop Flanders)	10
Belgium (Ultratop 50 Wallonia)	2
Belgium Dance (Ultratop Wallonia)	1
Canada Hot 100 (Billboard)	51
Czech Republic Airplay (ČNS IFPI)	3
Denmark (Tracklisten)	9
Finland (Suomen virallinen lista)	6
France (SNEP)	64
Germany (GfK)	10
Hungary (Dance Top 40)	36
Hungary (Rádiós Top 40)	36
Hungary (Single Top 40)	22
Hungary (Stream Top 40)	8
Ireland (IRMA)	5
Italy (FIMI)	15
Mexico Ingles Airplay (Billboard)	2
Netherlands (Dutch Top 40)	5
Netherlands (Global Top 40)	23
Netherlands (Single Top 100)	6
New Zealand (Recorded Music NZ)	16
Norway (VG-lista)	1
Poland Airplay (ZPAV)	11
Poland (Video Chart)	2
Portugal (AFP)	17
Russia Airplay (Tophit)	16
Scottish Singles Sales (Official Charts)	7
Slovakia Airplay (ČNS IFPI)	82
Spain (Promusicae)	26
Sweden (Sverigetopplistan)	4
Switzerland (Schweizer Hitparade)	13
UK Singles (Official Charts)	4
UK Dance (Official Charts)	2
US Billboard Hot 100	88
US Hot Dance/Electronic Songs (Billboard)	7
US Dance Club Songs (Billboard)	26

=== Year-end charts ===
Chart (2016)	Position
Argentina (Monitor Latino)	68
Australia (ARIA)	58
Austria (Ö3 Austria Top 40)	33
Belgium (Ultratop Flanders)	67
Belgium (Ultratop Wallonia)	32
Denmark (Tracklisten)	50
France (SNEP)	127
Germany (Official German Charts)	37
Italy (FIMI)	38
Netherlands (Dutch Top 40)	33
Netherlands (Single Top 100)	32
Poland (ZPAV)	50
Spain (PROMUSICAE)	50
Sweden (Sverigetopplistan)	27
Switzerland (Schweizer Hitparade)	42
UK Singles (Official Charts Company)	30
US Hot Dance/Electronic Songs (Billboard)	21

== Certifications ==
Region	Certification	Certified units/sales
Australia (ARIA)	Platinum	70,000^{‡}
Austria (IFPI Austria)	Gold	15,000^{‡}
Belgium (BRMA)	Platinum	20,000^{‡}
Brazil (Pro-Música Brasil)	3× Platinum	180,000^{‡}
Canada (Music Canada)	2× Platinum	160,000^{‡}
Denmark (IFPI Danmark)	Platinum	90,000^{‡}
France (SNEP)	Platinum	133,333^{‡}
Germany (BVMI)	Platinum	400,000^{‡}
Italy (FIMI)	3× Platinum	150,000^{‡}
New Zealand (RMNZ)	2× Platinum	60,000^{‡}
Poland (ZPAV)	Diamond	100,000^{‡}
Portugal (AFP)	Platinum	10,000^{‡}
Spain (Promusicae)	2× Platinum	80,000^{‡}
Switzerland (IFPI Switzerland)	Gold	15,000^{‡}
United Kingdom (BPI)	2× Platinum	1,200,000^{‡}
United States (RIAA)	2× Platinum	2,000,000^{‡}
^{‡} Sales+streaming figures based on certification alone.
