= Henrik Jonback =

Swedish producer and songwriter

Henrik Jonback (born 1973) is a Swedish producer, songwriter and musician.

== Career ==
Jonback's writing credits include Britney Spears, Madonna, Avicii, Galantis, Miike Snow, Kelis, Kylie Minogue, David Guetta, Dolly Parton, OneRepublic, Ms. Dynamite, Sugababes, and Christina Milian. He has worked in close collaboration with producers Bloodshy & Avant over the years. Jonback co-wrote "Toxic" with Cathy Dennis and Bloodshy & Avant; it became one of the best selling singles of 2004.

== Discography ==
=== 2026 ===
From Galantis, The Devil's Tax Return: Volume 1

- ”Stay Alive" (Producer & Musician)
- ”Do You Mind" (Producer & Musician)
- ”Can’t Take My Eyes Off You" (Producer & Musician)
- ”When You Were Young" (Producer & Musician)
- ”1234" (Producer & Musician)
- ”Red Eyes" (Producer & Musician)

From The Amplifetes's Fascination

- ”Fascination"

=== 2025 ===
From Joel Corry, Galantis, Izzy Bizu's Stay a Little Longer

- ”Stay A Little Longer" (Producer, Writer & Musician)

From Galantis, Peach Martine, secs on the beach's Circles

- ”Circles" (Producer, Writer & Musician)

From The Amplifetes's Idiots

- ”Idiots"

From Daniel Adams-Ray's Pandemi, Palestina & Heartache

- ”Hoppa eller hoppas" (Writer)
- ”Hur förklarar man sånt för datorer” (Writer)

=== 2024 ===
From BULLI's Planes

- ”Planes" (Producer, Writer, Musician)

From Galantis's Rx

- ”8 Days" (Producer, Writer & Musician)

From BULLI's Show Me The Way

- ”Show Me The Way" (Producer, Writer, Musician)

From Galantis's Rx

- ”Get You Alone" (Producer, Writer, Musician & Mixer)
- ”Side Effects (feat. Rain Davis)" (Producer, Writer & Musician)
- ”6 Feet Down" (Producer, Writer & Musician)

From Galantis, David Guetta & 5 Seconds of Summer's Lighter

- ”Lighter" (Producer, Writer & Musician)

From Galantis's One, Two, & 3

- ”One, Two, & 3" (Producer, Writer & Musician)

=== 2023 ===
From Galantis, Hannah Boleyn's Little Bit Yours

- ”Little Bit Yours" (Writer & Musician)

From The Amplifetes's Spin It

- ”Spin It"

From Galantis's BANG BANG! (My Neurodivergent Anthem)

- ”BANG BANG (My Neurodivergent Anthem)" (Producer, Writer & Musician)

From Icona Pop, Galantis's I Want You

- ”I Want You" (Producer, Writer & Musician)

From RIKA, Galantis's Hooked (Hot Stuff)

- ”Hooked (Hot Stuff)" (Producer, Writer & Musician)

=== 2022 ===
From DVBBS and Galantis (feat Cody Simpson) When The Lights Go Down

- ”When The Lights Go Down" (Writer & Producer)

=== 2021 ===
From Galantis, Lucas & Steve, ILIRA's Alien

- ”Alien" (Producer & Writer)

From Galantis (with David Guetta & Little Mix)'s Heartbreak Anthem

- ”Heartbreak Anthem" (Writer & Musician)

From Hook n Sling, Galantis, Karen Harding's The Best

- ”The Best" (Writer)

From Daniel Adams-Ray's Döda Hjärtan Kan Slå Igen

- ”Tunna Kläder" (Writer & Musician)
- ”Hannas Sång" (Writer & Musician)

From Galantis, JVKE's Dandelion

- ”Dandelion" (Writer & Musician)

=== 2020 ===
From Galantis, Ship Wrek, Pink Sweat$'s Only a Fool (with Pink Sweat$)

- ”Only a Fool (with Pink Sweat$)" (Producer & Musician)

From Galantis's The Lake

- "The Lake (with Wrabel)" (Producer, Writer & Musician)

From Galantis's Church

- "Steel" (Producer, Writer & Musician)
- "Faith (with Dolly Parton) feat. Mr Probz" (Producer, Writer & Musician)
- "Unless It Hurts" (Producer, Writer & Musician)
- "Never Felt A Love Like This (with Hook N Sling) feat. Dotan" (Producer, Writer & Musician)
- "Holy Water" (Producer, Writer & Musician)
- "Stella" (Producer, Writer & Musician)
- "I Found U (with Passion Pit)" (Producer, Writer & Musician)
- "Fuck Tomorrow Now" (Producer, Writer & Musician)
- "Miracle (with Bali Bandits)" (Producer, Writer & Musician)
- "Feel Something (feat. Flyckt)" (Producer, Writer & Musician)
- "We Can Get High (with Yellow Claw)" (Producer, Writer & Musician)
- "Bones (feat. OneRepublic)" (Producer, Writer & Musician)

=== 2019 ===
From Galantis & Dolly Parton feat Mr. Probz's Faith

- "Faith" (Producer, Writer & Musician)

From Galantis's Holy Water

- "Holy Water" (Producer, Writer & Musician)

From Galantis & Yellow Claw's We Can Get High

- "We Can Get High" (Producer, Writer & Musician)

From Passion Pit & Galantis's I Found U

- "I Found U" (Producer, Writer & Musician)

From Galantis's Bones (feat. OneRepublic)

- "Bones (feat. OneRepublic)" (Producer, Writer & Musician)

=== 2018 ===
From Galantis's San Francisco (with Sofia Carson)

- "San Francisco (with Sofia Carson)" (Producer, Writer & Musician)

From HUMAN's IRL

- "Lights" (Writer & Musician)
- "Love Letter" (Producer, Writer & Musician)
- "Ghost" (Producer, Writer & Musician)
- "Ghetto" (Producer, Writer & Musician)

From Galantis's Emoji

- "Emoji" (Producer, Writer & Musician)

From Galantis's Satisfied (feat MAX) & Mama Look At Me Now

- "Satisfied (feat MAX)" (Producer, Writer & Musician)
- "Mama Look at Me Now" (Producer, Writer & Musician)

From Galantis (feat Uffie)'s Spaceship

- "Spaceship" (Producer, Writer & Musician)

=== 2017 ===
From Galantis's The Aviary

- "True Feeling" (Producer, Writer & Musician)
- "Hey Alligator" (Producer, Writer & Musician)
- "Girls On Boys" (Producer, Writer & Musician)
- "Salvage (Up All Night)" (Producer, Writer & Musician)
- "Tell Me You Love Me" (Producer, Writer & Musician)
- "Hello" (Producer, Writer & Musician)
- "Hunter" (Producer, Writer & Musician)
- "Written In The Scars" (Producer, Writer & Musician)
- "Call Me Home" (Producer, Writer & Musician)
- "Love On Me" (Producer, Writer & Musician)
- "Pillowfight" (Producer, Writer & Musician)
- "No Money" (Producer, Writer & Musician)

From Shapov's Four Corners

- "More Than Love" (Co-Producer, Writer & Musician)

=== 2016 ===
From Gina Dirawi's Hurt You So Bad

- "Hurt You So Bad" (Producer, Writer & Musician)

From Galantis and East & Young's Make Me Feel from XOXO the Netflix Original film

- "Make Me Feel" (Producer, Writer & Musician)

From Daniel Adams-Ray's För Er

- "Isabel" (Producer, Writer & Musician)
- "Olof" (Producer, Writer & Musician)

=== 2015 ===
From Miike Snow's iii

- "Genghis Khan" (Co-Producer, Writer & Musician)
- "Back Of The Car" (Co-Producer, Writer & Musician)

From Avicii's Stories

- "Somewhere In Stockholm" (Writer & Musician)

From Petter's Mitt Folk

- "Mitt Folk" (Producer, Writer & Musician)
- "Pris På Mitt Huvud" (Producer, Writer & Musician)

From Galantis's Pharmacy

- "Peanut Butter Jelly" (Writer)
- "Forever Tonight" (Writer, Musician)
- "In My Head" (Writer, Musician)
- "Firebird" (Writer, Musician)

From Daniel Adams-Ray's Thinking Of Sunshine

- "Thinking Of Sunshine " (Producer, Writer & Musician)

=== 2014 ===
From Mapei's Hey Hey

- "Things You Know Nothing About" (Producer, Writer & Musician)

From Gina Dirawi's LOVE

- "LOVE" (Producer, Writer & Musician)

From Daniel Adams-Ray's Babbelover

- "Babbelover (Henrik Jonback Remix)"

From Galantis's Galantis EP

- "Revolution" (Writer & Musician)
- "The Heart That I'm Hearing" (Writer & Musician)

=== 2013 ===
From Daniel Adams-Ray's Innan vi suddas ut

- "Aldrig Mer Gå Ensam" (Producer, Writer & Musician)
- "Precis Som Jag" (Producer, Writer & Musician)
- "Innan Vi Suddas Ut" (Producer, Writer & Musician)
- "Babbelover" (Producer, Writer & Musician)
- "Tårarnas Reservoar" (Producer, Writer & Musician)
- "Svär På Mammas Grav" (Producer, Writer & Musician)
- "Drömfångare" (Producer, Writer & Musician)
- "Redo Att Dö" (Producer, Writer & Musician)
- "Allt Det Där Jag Aldrig Blev" (Producer, Writer & Musician)
- "Där Regnbågen Tar Slut" (Musician)

From The Amplifetes's Where Is the Light

- "Interlude - House Call"
- "Where Is The Light"
- "You Want It"
- "My Heart Is Leaving Town"
- "You/Me/Evolution"
- "Tracey Clark"
- "Keep On Running"
- "Start:Stop"
- "Never Going Back"
- "S.E.O.K.L"
- "This Can't Be It"

=== 2012 ===
From Maskinen's Framgång & Efterfrågan

- "Stora Trygga Vargen" (Producer, Writer & Musician)

From Zowie's Love Demolition

- "My Calculator" (Producer, Writer & Musician)
- "The Bang Bangs" (Producer, Writer & Musician)

=== 2011 ===
From Britney Spears' Femme Fatale

- "How I Roll" (Producer, Writer & Musician)
- "Trip To Your Heart" (Producer, Writer & Musician)

Richee

- Dawn Tales (Remake of Madonna's How High)

=== 2010 ===
From The Amplifetes' The Amplifetes

- "Intro"
- "It's My Life"
- "Maxine"
- "Somebody New"
- "Blinded By The Moonlight"
- "When The Music Died"
- "There She Walks"
- "A Million Men"
- "There Will Never Be Another One"
- "Fokker"
- "It Can't Rain All The Time"

=== 2009 ===
From Miike Snow's Miike Snow

- "Animal" (Writer)
- "Black & Blue" (Writer)

From BoA's Best & USA

- "Universe" (Writer & Musician)

From BoA's BoA

- "Did Ya" (Writer & Musician)
- "Eat You Up" (Producer & Musician)
- "Look Who's Talking" (Producer, Writer & Musician)
- "Hypnotic Dancefloor (Producer & Musician)

=== 2008 ===
From Britney Spears' Circus

- "Unusual You" (Writer & Musician)
- "Phonography" (Writer & Musician)
- "Trouble" (iTunes Pre-order bonus track) (Writer & Musician)

From Crystal Kay's Namida no Saki ni (涙のさきに; Beyond the Tears)

- "Dream World" (SOIDOG MIX) Remixed together with Bloodshy & Avant
- "Namida no Saki ni (涙のさきに; Beyond the Tears)" (SOIDOG MIX) Remixed together with Bloodshy & Avant"

From Sean Garrett's Turbo 919

- "Turbo 919" (Writer & Musician)

From Leon Jean Marie's Bent out of shape

- "You Must Know" (Writer & Musician)
- "Bring It On" (Musician)
- "East End Blues" (Writer & Musician)
- "Jumpin Off the Block" (Writer & Musician)

=== 2007 ===
From Britney Spears' Blackout

- "Piece of Me" (UK #2, US #18) 3 time VMA winner (Musician)
- "Radar" (co-produced by The Clutch) (US #88, SWE #8) (Writer & Musician)
- "Freakshow" (Writer & Musician)

From Jordin Sparks

- "Shy Boy" (Writer & Musician)
- "Young and in Love" (Writer & Musician)

From Kevin Michael

- "We All Want the Same Thing" featuring Lupe Fiasco (Writer & musician)
- "Hoodbuzzin" (Musician)
- "Lollipop" (unreleased) (Writer & Musician)

From Kylie Minogue's X

- "Nu-di-ty" (Musician)
- "Speakerphone" (Writer & Musician)

From the soundtrack Music and Lyrics: Music from the Motion Picture

- "Haley Bennett - Buddha's Delight" (Writer & Musician)

=== 2006 ===
From Kelis' Kelis Was Here

- "Fire" featuring Spragga Benz (Writer & Musician)

=== 2005 ===
From Britney Spears' Someday (I Will Understand) - CD Single and Britney & Kevin: Chaotic - Bonus CD

- "Chaotic" (Writer & Musician)
- "Mona Lisa" (Musician)

From Brooke Valentine's Chain Letter

- "Blah-Blah-Blah" featuring Ol Dirty Bastard (Writer & Musician)
- "American Girl" (Writer & Musician)
- "Thrill of the Chase" (Writer & Musician)

From Madonna's Confessions on a Dance Floor

- "How High" (Writer & Musician)
- "Like It or Not" (Writer & Musician)

From Rob Thomas' ...Something to Be

- "This Is How a Heart Breaks" (Writer)

From Utada's Exodus

- "You Make Me Want to Be a Man" (Musician)

=== 2004 ===
From Britney Spears' Greatest Hits: My Prerogative

- "My Prerogative" (UK #3) (Musician)
- "Do Somethin'" (UK #6) (Writer & Musician)
- "(I've Just Begun) Having My Fun" (Writer & Musician)

From Christina Milian's It's About Time

- "I Need More" (Writer & Musician)

From Ms. Dynamite's Judgement Days

- "Not Today" (#7 UK) (Writer & Musician)
- "Shavaar" (#7 UK) (Writer & Musician)

From Bro´sis' Showtime

- "Freaky Deaky" (Writer & Musician)
- "My One And Only" (Writer & Musician)

From Guy Sebastian's Beautiful Life

- "Anthem Of Why" (Writer & Musician)

=== 2003 ===
From Britney Spears' In the Zone

- "Toxic" (UK #1, US #9) Grammy Award winner (Writer & Musician)
- "Showdown" (Writer & Musician)

From Rachel Stevens' Funky Dory

- "Sweet Dreams My L.A. Ex" (UK #2) (Writer & Musician)
- "Glide" (Writer & Musician)

From Janet Jackson Damita Jo

- "Slo Love" (Musician)

From Billy Crawford's Ride

- "The Way She Rocks My World" (bonus track) (Writer & Musician)

From Jody Lei's Showdown

- "Showdown" (Writer & Musician)

From Ruby Amanfu's Sugah

- "Some of That Marley" (Writer & Musician)

From Lene Nystrøm's Play With Me

- "Up in Smoke" (Writer & Musician)

=== 2002 ===
From Santana Shaman

- "Let me love you tonight" (Musician)

From Christina Milian's Christina Milian

- "When You Look at Me" (#3 UK) (Writer & Musician)
- "Last Call" (Writer & Musician)
- "Snooze You Lose" (Writer & Musician)

From Ms. Dynamite's A Little Deeper

- "It Takes More" (Bloodshy Main mix) - (#7 UK) (Musician)
- "Brother" (Writer & Musician)
- "Put Him Out" - (A Little Deeper) (#28 UK) (Writer & Musician)

From Sugababes' Angels with Dirty Faces

- "Switch" (Writer & Musician)
- "Supernatural" (Musician)

From Samantha Mumba's The Collection

- "I'm Right Here"(#5 UK) (Writer & Musician)

=== 2001 ===
- Amanda - "You Don't Stand A Chance" (Writer & Musician)
- Amanda - "Call Me" (Writer & Musician)
- Stella Soleil - "Let's Just Go To Bed" (Writer & Musician)

From Bardot's Play It Like That

- "ASAP" (Writer & Musician)
- "When The Cat's Away" (Writer & Musician)

=== 2000 ===
From Richard Blackwood's "You'll Love To Hate This"

- "1,2,3,4 - Get With The Wicked" (Writer & Musician)
- "Someone There For Me" (Writer & Musician)

== Awards ==
- ASCAP Award for Most Performed Song - "Toxic" - 2005
- Ivor Novello Award - Performing Right Society (PRS) Most Performed Work - "Toxic" - 2005
- SMFF Award - 2006
- SKAP Award - "Toxic" - 2006
- SKAP Award - Producer of the year - "Galantis" - 2016
