= Hook n Sling =

Australian musician

Hook N Sling
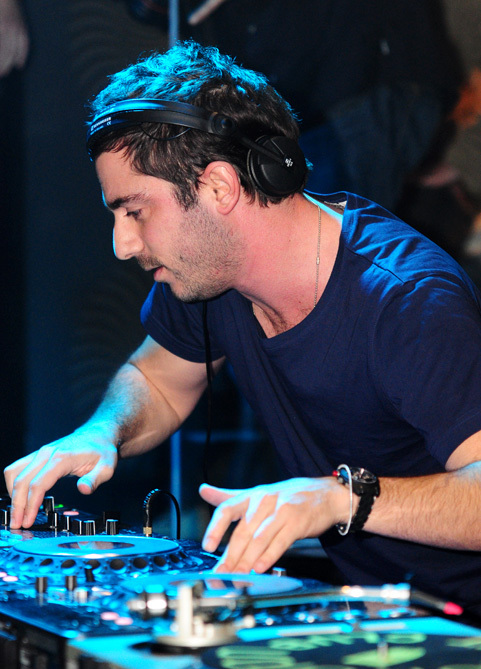
- Hook N Sling in 2009

Background information
- Born: Anthony Maniscalco; 12 November 1977 (age 48); Sydney, New South Wales, Australia
- Origin: Sydney, New South Wales, Australia
- Genres: House
- Occupations: Songwriter, producer, DJ
- Years active: 2007–present
- Labels: Spinnin' Records, Axtone Records
- Website: www.hooknsling.com

Anthony Maniscalco (born 12 November 1977), better known by his stage name Hook N Sling, is an Australian record producer, songwriter and DJ, currently residing in Los Angeles, California.

== Musical career ==
In 2007 he received an ARIA Music Awards nomination, a DMC Buzz Chart No. 1 and several Pete Tong plays for his breakout tune "The Bump". Hook N Sling has played at venues and festivals across the world including Pacha, Space Ibiza, Global Gathering, Future Music Festival and Stereosonic.

In 2011 he toured the United States and played with Wolfgang Gartner at the infamous Music Box in Los Angeles. He also claimed a Hype Machine number one with the track "Take You Higher" with Goodwill.

In February 2012 he set off on a tour across the United States, Dominican Republic and Canada.

In 2014 his single "Tokyo by Night" was released with a remix from Swedish DJ Axwell on his label Axtone. The remix premiered on 18 April 2014 and gained BBC Radio 1 support from Danny Howard. It topped the Beatport charts the week after its release.

== Discography ==
=== Extended plays ===
Year	Title	Release date	Label
2004	"Number Cruncher"	30 November 2004	Hussle n Bussle
2007	"Silver Service"	15 June 2007	Hussle n Bussle
2008	"Plastic Wrap"	7 February 2008	Hussle Recordings
2009	"Highball / Another Night"	4 March 2009	Hussle Recordings

=== Singles ===
Year	Title	Release date	Label	Note
2007	"The Bump"	2007	Hussle Recordings	
2008	"The Best Thing (2008)"	21 July 2008	Hussle Recordings	No. 27 ARIA Singles Chart
2009	"Working Kings Cross" (with Adam K)	20 July 2009	Hussle Recordings	
2010	"Gotta Make a Move" (featuring Snob Scrilla)	7 February 2010	Astrx	
2011	"Diamonds in the Sky" (with TV Rock featuring Rudy)	18 March 2011	Flamingo Recordings	No. 12 DMC Ade Buzz Chart
2011	"Edge of the Earth" (with Richard Dinsdale and Sam Obernik)	12 July 2011	Stealth Recordings	
2011	"Take You Higher" (with Goodwill)	28 July 2011	Astrx	No. 1 Hype Machine, Gold Sales in Belgium, No. 1 iTunes (Main Singles Chart) in Belgium, No. 1 iTunes (Electronic Singles Chart) in Italy
2012	"Surrender" (with Evermore)	25 June 2012	Spinnin' Records	No. 7 Beatport (Progressive House Chart)
2012	"Reason" (with NERVO)	7 September 2012	Spinnin' Records	No. 2 Beatport (Main Chart), No. 4 Hype Machine
2013	"Don't You Know"	26 April 2013	Spinnin' Records	No. 3 ARIA Club Chart, No. 9 Beatport (Progressive House Chart)
2013	"Magnet" (with Chris Willis)	5 August 2013	Spinnin' Records	
2014	"Celebrate" (Hook n Sling Remix) (vs. Empire of the Sun)	25 February 2014	Capitol Records	
2014	"Tokyo by Night" (Axwell Remix) (featuring Karin Park)	28 April 2014	Axtone Records	No. 1 Beatport (Main Chart)
2014	"Tokyo by Night" (featuring Karin Park)	20 October 2014	Diversion Recordings	
2014	"Momentum"	10 November 2014	Doorn Records	No. 1 DMC ADE Buzz Chart (16 October 2014)
2015	"Break Yourself" (featuring Far East Movement and Pusha T)	14 August 2015	Polydor	
2016	"Love on Me" (with Galantis)	30 September 2016	Big Beat Records	
2017	"Open Your Eyes" (with Sam Feldt)	24 February 2017	Spinnin' Records	
2017	"If You're Hearing This"(with Parson James and Betty Who)	30 June 2017	RCA Records	
2017	"Arms Around Me" (featuring Digital Farm Animals)	25 August 2017	Hook Industries Inc.	
2018	"Shoot Down The Sun"	13 April 2018	Hook Industries Inc.	
2018	"Turning Me On"	23 November 2018	Spinnin' Records	
2019	"Superstars" (featuring The Loose Cannons)	6 September 2019	Spinnin' Records	
2021	"Break My Heart" (featuring Nico & Vinz)	26 November 2021	Universal Music	
2022	"Afterparty" (with Loud Luxury)	2 December 2022	Armada Music	

=== Music videos ===
Year	Title	Director	Release date	Label	Note
2008	"The Best Thing (2008)"	Nicolas Randall & Scott Otto Anderson	21 July 2008	Hussle Recordings	
2011	"Take You Higher" (with Goodwill)	Benn Jae	6 November 2011	Nettwerk Music	Over 8.7 million views on YouTube
2012	"Reason" (with NERVO)	Alex de Bonrepos & Kyle Padilla	7 September 2012	Spinnin' Records	Over 6.9 million views on YouTube
2014	"Tokyo by Night" (featuring Karin Park)	Teun van der Zalm & Daan Verbiest	24 October 2014	Diversion Recordings	

=== Remixes ===
Year	Artist	Title
2006	Sarah McLeod	He Doesn't Love You (Hook n Sling Vocal Mix) and (Hook n Sling Dub Mix)
2006	Martijn ten Velden and Paul Harris	I Wish U Would
2006	WhoMadeWho	Out the Door
2007	Darren Hayes	Step into the Light
2007	Tonite Only	Danger (The Bomb) (Hook n Sling and Kid Kenobi Remix)
2007	Stanton Warriors	Shake It Up
2007	Nasty Tales	Come On-A My House (Hook n Sling's 'Dump Your Dealer' Remix) and (Hook n Sling's 'Fly Boy' Remix)
2007	Bass Kleph	Coup d'état
2007	Subsource	This Town
2007	Toby Neal	Do You Really (Want My Love)
2008	Cadence	Lazy Love
2008	James Harcourt	Mea Culpa
2008	Calvin Harris	I'm Not Alone
2008	Cobra Dukes	Leave the Light On
2008	The Potbelleez	Are You with Me
2009	Miike Snow	Silvia (Hook n Sling and Goodwill Remix)
2009	Miami Horror	Sometimes
2009	La Roux vs. Dataworx	In for the Kill (Hook n Sling Edit)
2009	Style of Eye featuring Stephen Simmonds	Galore
2009	Fedde Le Grand featuring Mitch Crown	Let Me Be Real (Hook n Sling and Goodwill Remix)
2009	David Vendetta	She Turns Around
2009	Sam La More	I Wish It Could Last
2010	Pocket808 featuring Nathan Hudson	Ghostship
2010	Chris Sorbello	So Lonely
2010	Paul Harris, Michael Gray, Jon Pearn featuring Amanda Wilson	Caught Up
2010	Rhythm Masters and MYNC featuring Wynter Gordon	I Feel Love (Hook n Sling and Goodwill Remix)
2010	Bass Kleph	Where Do We Go
2010	Ou Est Le Swimming Pool	Jackson's Last Stand
2011	The Aston Shuffle feat. Lovers Electric	Start Again
2011	Hard Rock Sofa and St. Brothers	Blow Up (Hook n Sling and Goodwill Remix)
2011	Wolfgang Gartner featuring will.i.am	Forever
2011	NERVO featuring Afrojack and Steve Aoki	We're All No One
2011	Flo Rida	Good Feeling
2012	Michael Calfan	Mozaik
2013	The Presets	Fall
2013	Kaskade	Atmosphere
2014	Lana Del Rey	Ultraviolence
2015	Sultan + Ned Sheperd featuring Denny White	Don't Let Me Down
2016	Matoma and Becky Hill	False Alarm
2017	Cheat Codes and Demi Lovato	"No Promises"
2018	Clara Mae	"I'm Not Her"
2018	Kygo and Miguel	"Remind Me to Forget"
2019	Robin Schulz featuring Harlœ	"All This Love"
2019	Ava Max	"Torn"
2021	Faouzia and John Legend	"Minefields"

=== Mix compilations ===
- 2008 Clubbers Guide Ministry of Sound
- 2009 Progression 2 (Ministry of Sound)
- 2010 Clubbers Guide Ministry of Sound
- 2011 The Annual Ministry of Sound

== Awards and nominations ==
=== ARIA Music Awards ===
The ARIA Music Awards is an annual awards ceremony that recognises excellence, innovation, and achievement across all genres of Australian music.

Year	Nominee / work	Award	Result
2007	"The Bump" (with Kid Kenobi)	Best Dance Release	Nominated

=== Berlin Music Video Awards ===
The Berlin Music Video Awards is an international music festival that promotes the art of music videos.

Year	Nominee / work	Award	Result
2016	BREAK YOURSELF	Best Concept	Nominated
