= Galantis =

Swedish electronic music act

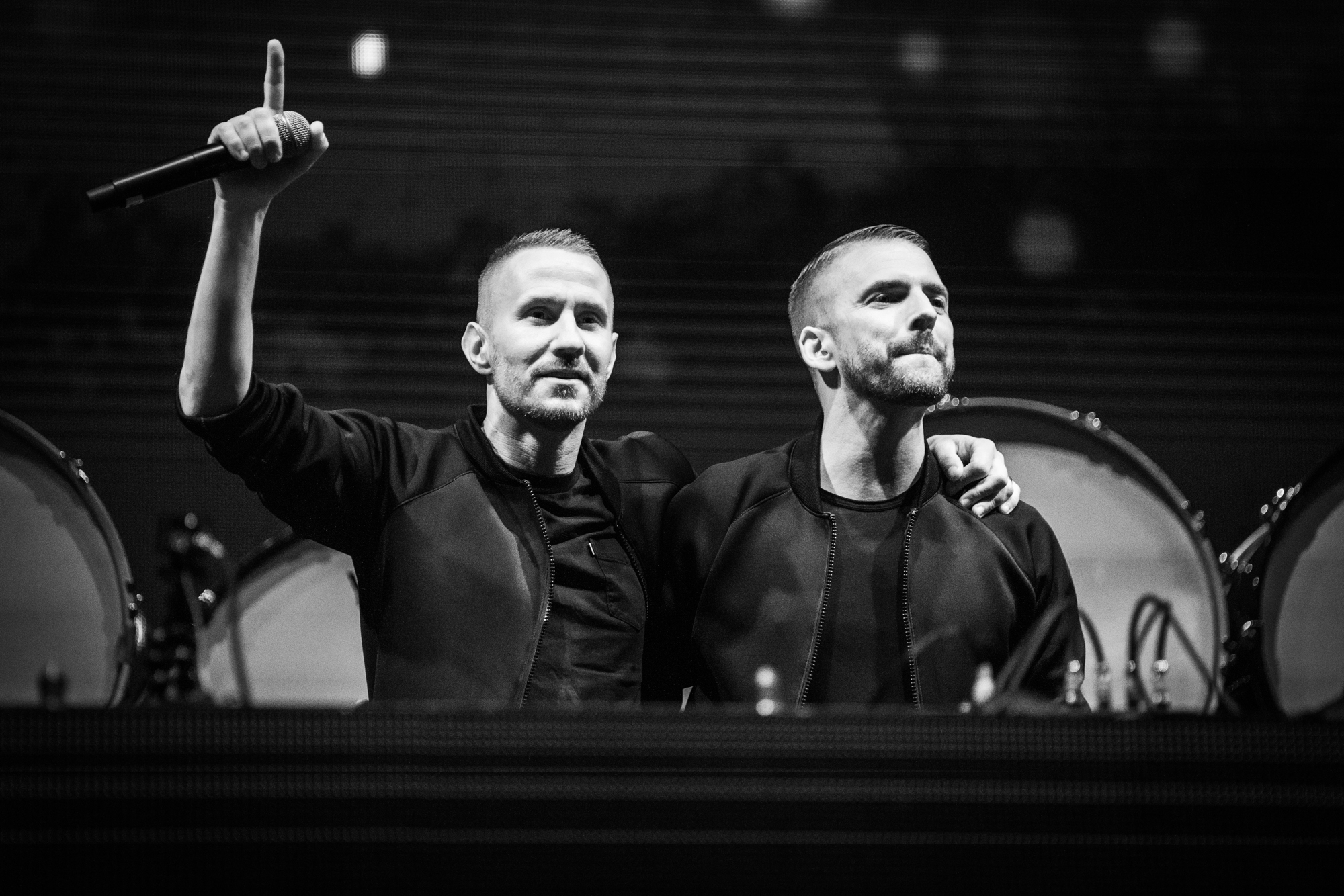
- Galantis performing in 2018

Background information
- Origin: Stockholm, Sweden
- Genres: EDM, progressive house, dance pop, big room house, electro house
- Instruments: Programming; synthesiser; piano; turntable; guitar
- Years active: 2012–present
- Labels: Big Beat; Atlantic; Warner
- Members: Bloodshy
- Past members: Style of Eye
- Website: wearegalantis.com

Galantis is a Swedish electronic music act consisting of producer Christian "Bloodshy" Karlsson. Formerly, it was a duo, alongside rising musician Style of Eye, until he decided to part ways with the project shortly after their second album The Aviary in 2017. However, he made appearances in live performances and music videos as part of the project up until 2021.

Galantis had their first international success with "Runaway (U & I)" released in 2014, followed by their other hits "Peanut Butter Jelly" and "No Money".

== History ==
=== 2007–2012: Early career ===
The duo initially met by chance at Karlsson's Robotberget studios in Stockholm, sometime in 2007. In 2009, Karlsson's band Miike Snow asked Eklöw, who produces and DJs as Style of Eye, to remix their song "Animal". After that, the two started hanging out in the studio together, playing each other songs and scraps of ideas. Explaining what drew him to Eklöw, Karlsson says, "He's an amazing programmer and designer of soundscapes. It was artsy, in a way. He was different."

There were many unfinished ideas that the pair fiddled with and then abandoned, but it wasn't until sometime in 2012 that things really came together, when they stopped the loop-based and software approach common in modern dance music, and switched to Karlsson's usual method of beginning a song on guitar or piano. The duo figured out their own approach—once they create a foundation with a simple arrangement, they build it up with stirring keyboards, monumental drums, imploring vocals and inventive flourishes. "We keep the song naked, and when we feel like we have the right one, we put some clothes on it and see how it feels," says Karlsson. "We realized, this is Galantis, this is our band," Karlsson adds.

=== 2013–2014: "You", "Smile", Galantis EP, "Runaway (U & I)", and international breakthrough ===
The duo signed to Atlantic Records' dance imprint Big Beat Records in mid-2013. Recording in a studio in the Swedish archipelago in the Baltic Sea, the duo began to focus heavily on their artistic direction. They opt to combine the excitement and big energy of electronic music with meaningful songwriting. The first composition they agreed upon was "Smile". After that, their direction became clear. "We felt the urge to fill the dance world up with songs and with songwriting that created our sound," says Eklöw.

Karlsson has said: "We always start with the song. We use guitar, piano, and bass lines we don't keep to figure out which clothes we're going to put on each melody and lyric. I think that's different than a lot of others in the dance scene. They have a beat they love and then force a top line on top of it. I feel like that makes it sound like a remix. I'd rather do it our way, it's more fun too." The first single with Big Beat Records, "Smile", was released that following November. Its controversial video premiered on Stereogum. "Smile" received several remixes from various artists, and an extended mix by dance music heavyweight Kaskade.

"Smile" also marked the first instance of the "Seafox", a creature that is the brainchild of visual artist Mat Maitland. The "Seafox" is the Galantis mascot, appearing in their videos, cover art and their live show.

In February, the duo released their second single "You". The track was subsequently played heavily during Ultra Music Festival and Miami Music Week, becoming the 8th most Shazamed track at the festival. Their debut self-titled EP Galantis was released on 1 April 2014.

Galantis had international success with their single "Runaway (U & I)", which debuted on 5 October 2014. The single is the second single from their debut album Pharmacy. The song subsequently went to the top of Spotify's Global and US Viral charts and became a top 10 Spotify track in the Netherlands, Belgium and Finland. In America, the track peaked at number 1 on the Billboard Twitter Emerging Artists chart. "Runaway (U & I)" has been certified Gold in Finland, 3× Gold in the Netherlands and Platinum in Norway and Sweden. Galantis released the single "Gold Dust" on 19 February 2015, through Stereogum and reached number 1 on Hype Machine's Popular Chart.

Karlsson and Eklöw said: "When we started Galantis, we set out to challenge each other and experiment with all of the sounds and ideas that we find exciting. We built a studio on a small island in the Baltic Sea and our surroundings became a source of inspiration for the EP."

The first song, "Smile", has been featured by Kaskade, Diplo, Tiesto, Dada Life, Steve Angello, and Pete Tong, who featured it as an "Essential Tune", a feature on his BBC Radio 1 show. Their single "You" follows with a piano and vocal hook with the custom "Galantis filter", which blends male and female vocals together. Their song "Revolution" contains synths and a beat with an intended message of never giving up on your ambitions. "Help" follows and builds a piano melody into an anthem of resiliency. "Friend (Hard Times)" pairs a vocal with a deep house groove, while "The Heart That I'm Hearing" contains synths and a skittering rhythm.

=== 2015: Pharmacy ===
Galantis released their debut album Pharmacy on 8 June 2015. The album was available for pre-order on 20 April 2015. The album features the four singles "You" (from their first EP), "Runaway (U & I)", "Gold Dust", and "Peanut Butter Jelly". The 13-track album is the first LP from Galantis. The duo uploaded each song to their YouTube channel with alternate artworks for each track. The seventh track "Kill 'Em With The Love" is the only track with the seafox from the album cover. Whilst "Firebird" shares one with their most recognisable single, "Runaway (U & I)". On 21 May 2015, Galantis began their summer tour in support of Pharmacy which ended on 6 August 2015. There were 22 dates on the tour in total, with various performances in multiple continents including Europe and North America, and each performance was for some kind of music festival.

=== 2016–2017: The Aviary ===
On 1 April 2016, the pair released the single "No Money", which became their first single to debut on the US Billboard Hot 100. On 5 August 2016, they released the standalone single "Make Me Feel" for the soundtrack to Netflix's original film, XOXO. This song later became one of the most popular songs on the billboard hot 100, reaching the top 50.

On 30 September 2016, Galantis and Hook N Sling released the collaborative single "Love on Me" followed by a music video for the track on 4 October 2016, directed by Dano Cerny. On 15 December 2016, they released a lyric video for "Pillow Fight", which the band has said "brings back the original Galantis heart and roots." On 16 February 2017, the duo released the single "Rich Boy" along with a lyric video directed by We Wrk Wknds. On 5 May 2017, the duo released the single "Hunter", to be accompanied by a music video which has already been filmed. On 11 July 2017, it was announced on social media that Galantis' second studio album would be titled The Aviary, accompanied by the release of another single titled "True Feeling".

=== 2018–2020: Church ===
On 19 April 2018, Galantis was quoted in an interview with Las Vegas Weekly, stating that "we have new music coming out very soon. We're excited to let it free for the world." Subsequently, on 14 May 2018, the duo teased the release of their new single, "Spaceship" featuring Uffie, by posting a collage of all previous album covers, followed by a question mark. The posts and subsequent comments across social channels indicated that Galantis would premiere the song during their set at Hangout Music Festival, on 18 May 2018. On 16 May 2018, the group decided to release the single's album art on social accounts to further promote the song's release date. On 13 July 2018, the group released 2 songs called "Satisfied" featuring MAX and "Mama Look at Me Now" with a new album art cover of the seafox. In January 2019, the band released a “sizzle reel” in which they confirmed a new single "Bones" featuring OneRepublic would be coming in 2019. It was released on 25 January 2019. In mid-January 2020, Galantis and Charli XCX released a song to promote Universal Studios Japan's Super Nintendo World, this song was named "We Are Born to Play". Galantis released their third studio album Church, on 7 February 2020. Church consisted of fourteen songs and included collaborations with artists such as Yellow Claw, Passion Pit, Hook N Sling, Dotan, Dolly Parton, Mr. Probz and John Newman.

=== 2020–present: New singles ===
After the release of their third studio album, the duo worked on a single with Wrabel, titled "The Lake". They also released a song titled "I Fly" with Faouzia for the movie Scoob!. Galantis then collaborated with Pink Sweat$ and Ship Wrek on "Only a Fool", which was released on 29 May 2020, and with Jackson Wang of Got7 on the single "Pretty Please".

On 21 May 2021, Galantis released the single "Heartbreak Anthem" with French DJ David Guetta and British girl group Little Mix.

== Members ==
=== Christian Karlsson ===
Christian "Bloodshy" Karlsson has worked as part of the production duo Bloodshy & Avant and the Swedish indie pop band Miike Snow. Karlsson has co-written and co-produced tracks for artists such as Katy Perry, Britney Spears, Jennifer Lopez, Kylie Minogue and Madonna. Specifically, Karlsson co-wrote the Britney Spears single "Toxic", which eventually earned an Ivor Novello award (for songwriting and composition) and a Grammy for Best Dance Recording. Karlsson is also a founding member of Swedish artist collective and record label Ingrid.

=== Linus Eklöw (former member) ===
Linus Eklöw, known by his stage name Style of Eye, co-wrote and produced Icona Pop's song "I Love It" featuring Charli XCX. Eklöw, a Sundsvall-born and Stockholm-based DJ and producer, resides in the techno genre and comes from the underground scene. He explores a range of musical styles, from techno to house via distinct percussion and minimal, floating melodies. After growing up in a jazz and soul oriented family and playing a drumkit at age 10, Eklöw transitioned to electronic music after getting his first computer aged 15 and making "weird downtempo dubbeat and trip hop". DJing upbeat drum and bass followed at 16, and Linus moved into studio production with releases and remixes on such labels as Classic Recordings, Tiny Sticks and Rabid Records.

== Discography ==
- Pharmacy (2015)
- The Aviary (2017)
- Church (2020)
- Rx (2024)

== Touring ==
=== Coachella ===
Galantis debuted their live show at Coachella Valley Music and Arts Festival on 12 April 2014. Their performance came less than two weeks after their first release. In a Billboard Poll, which asked fans to vote on Coachella 2014's Best Dance Music Moment, Galantis beat Calvin Harris, Flume, Chromeo, Disclosure and Girl Talk with 52% of the vote. Their performance garnered praise from Dancing Astroaut, LA Times and Billboard, among others. Dubbed 'Seafoxchella', their live set debuted original songs and remixes from such genres as pop, electro, and house. The duo played an hour-long set at the Gobi Tent, with live controllers, visuals, and seafox stage set. Highlights included their single "Smile", as well as remixes to their other tune, "You". Following the second weekend of the festival, the duo kicked off their first live tour with a string of dates in North America.

Galantis have performed at Coachella 2014, and recently in 2017. The group's performances are characterized by them waving seafox flags, jumping from the stage, and doing other stunts that increase the energy of their shows.

The duo have begun another world tour in support of their second album, The Aviary. The tour begins in United States at Ultra Music Festival as they travel across the country before returning to Europe.

=== Headlining ===
- Louder Harder Better Tour (2016)
- The Aviary Tour (2017–2018)
- Church of Galantis Tour (2020)

== Awards and nominations ==
Year	Awards	Category	Recipient	Outcome	Ref.
2016	Grammy Awards	Best Dance Recording	"Runaway (U & I)"	Nominated	
2016	International Dance Music Awards	Best Electro/Progressive House Track	"Peanut Butter Jelly"	Nominated	
2016	International Dance Music Awards	Best Music Video	"Peanut Butter Jelly"	Nominated	
2016	International Dance Music Awards	Best Progressive House/Electro DJ	Galantis	Nominated	
2016	International Dance Music Awards	Best Artist (Group)	Galantis	Nominated	
2016	International Dance Music Awards	Best Full Length Studio Recording	Pharmacy	Nominated	
2016	Electronic Music Awards & Foundation Show	Album of the Year	Pharmacy	Nominated	
2016	Electronic Music Awards & Foundation Show	Single of the Year	"Runaway (U & I)"	Nominated	
2016	MTV Europe Music Awards	Best Swedish Act	Galantis	Nominated	
2016	NRJ Music Awards	Best New DJ	Galantis	Nominated	
2017	MTV Europe Music Awards	Best Swedish Act	Galantis	Nominated	
2022	Brit Awards	Best International Song	"Heartbreak Anthem" (with David Guetta and Little Mix)	Nominated	
2022	iHeartRadio Music Awards	Dance Song of The Year	"Heartbreak Anthem" (with David Guetta and Little Mix)	Nominated	
2022	Grammis	Electro/Dance of the Year	"Heartbreak Anthem"/"Dandelion"/"Alien"	Nominated	
