= Eddie Rabbitt discography =

- Studio albums: 15
- Compilation albums: 7
- Singles: 47
- Music videos: 7
- #1 singles: 20

The following is a discography of American country music singer-songwriter Eddie Rabbitt.

== Studio albums ==
=== 1970s ===
Title	Album details	Peak chart positions		
Title	Album details	US Country	US	CAN Country
Eddie Rabbitt	Release date: August 1975; Label: Elektra Records; Formats: LP, 8-track, cassette	41	—	—
Rocky Mountain Music	Release date: October 1976; Label: Elektra Records; Formats: LP, 8-track, cassette	14	—	—
Rabbitt	Release date: May 24, 1977; Label: Elektra Records; Formats: LP, 8-track, cassette	4	—	—
Variations	Release date: March 14, 1978; Label: Elektra Records; Formats: LP, 8-track, cassette	9	143	9
Loveline	Release date: May 9, 1979; Label: Elektra Records; Formats: LP, 8-track, cassette	5	91	—
"—" denotes releases that did not chart

=== 1980s ===
Title	Album details	Peak chart positions				Certifications (sales threshold)
Title	Album details	US Country	US	AUS	CAN Country	Certifications (sales threshold)
Horizon	Release date: June 20, 1980; Label: Elektra Records; Formats: LP, 8-track, cassette	1	19	96	5	CAN: Platinum; US: Platinum
Step by Step	Release date: July 31, 1981; Label: Elektra Records; Formats: LP, cassette	1	23	—	—	US: Gold
Radio Romance	Release date: October 1, 1982; Label: Elektra Records; Formats: LP, cassette	5	31	—	—	
The Best Year of My Life	Release date: September 17, 1984; Label: Warner Bros. Records; Formats: LP, cassette	22	—	—	—	
Rabbitt Trax	Release date: March 24, 1986; Label: RCA Records; Formats: LP, cassette	6	—	—	—	
I Wanna Dance with You	Release date: March 1, 1988; Label: RCA Records; Formats: LP, cassette	34	—	—	—	
"—" denotes releases that did not chart

=== 1990s ===
Title	Album details	Peak positions
Title	Album details	US Country
Jersey Boy	Release date: April 17, 1990; Label: Capitol Records; Formats: CD, cassette	34
Ten Rounds	Release date: August 27, 1991; Label: Liberty Records; Formats: CD, cassette	—
Beatin' the Odds	Release date: September 23, 1997; Label: Intersound Records; Formats: CD, cassette	—
Songs from Rabbittland	Release date: April 10, 1998; Label: CEMA; Formats: CD, cassette	—
"—" denotes releases that did not chart

== Compilation albums ==
Title	Album details	Peak chart positions			Certifications (sales threshold)
Title	Album details	US Country	US	CAN Country	Certifications (sales threshold)
The Best of Eddie Rabbitt	Release date: 1979; Label: Elektra Records; Formats: LP, 8-track, cassette	12	151	4	US: Gold
Greatest Hits Vol. II	Release date: 1983; Label: Warner Bros. Records; Formats: LP, cassette	4	131	—	
Number Ones	Release date: May 28, 1985; Label: Warner Bros. Records; Formats: LP, cassette	34	—	—	
The Great Hits of Eddie Rabbitt	Release date: July 28, 1989; Label: RCA Records; Formats: LP, cassette	—	—	—	
All Time Greatest Hits	Release date: 1991; Label: Warner Bros. Records; Formats: CD	—	—	—	
Ten Years of Greatest Hits	Release date: March 12, 1991; Label: Liberty Records; Formats: CD, cassette	—	—	—	
Essentials	Release date: April 22, 2003; Label: Warner Strategic; Formats: CD	—	—	—	
Number One Hits	Release date: May 12, 2009; Label: Rhino Entertainment; Formats: CD, music download	71	—	—	
"—" denotes releases that did not chart

== Singles ==
=== 1960s and 1970s ===
Year	Single	Peak chart positions									Album
Year	Single	US Country	US	US AC	AUS	CAN Country	CAN	CAN AC	NZ	UK	Album
1964	"Six Nights and Seven Days"	—	—	—	—	—	—	—	—	—	Non-album singles
1968	"The Bed"	—	—	—	—	—	—	—	—	—	Non-album singles
1969	"Kentucky Rain"	—	—	—	—	—	—	—	—	—	Non-album singles
1974	"You Get to Me"	34	—	—	—	50	—	—	—	—	Eddie Rabbitt
1975	"Forgive and Forget"	12	—	—	—	21	—	—	—	—	Eddie Rabbitt
1975	"I Should Have Married You"	11	—	—	—	42	—	—	—	—	Eddie Rabbitt
1976	"Drinkin' My Baby (Off My Mind)"	1	—	—	—	1	—	—	—	—	Rocky Mountain Music
1976	"Rocky Mountain Music"	5	76	48	—	1	—	—	—	—	Rocky Mountain Music
1977	"Two Dollars in the Jukebox"	3	—	—	—	2	—	—	—	—	Rocky Mountain Music
1977	"I Can't Help Myself"	2	77	—	—	5	—	—	—	—	Rabbitt
1977	"We Can't Go On Living Like This"	6	—	—	—	1	—	—	—	—	Rabbitt
1978	"Hearts on Fire"	2	—	—	—	9	—	—	—	—	Variations
1978	"You Don't Love Me Anymore'	1	53	18	—	3	70	—	—	—	Variations
1978	"I Just Want to Love You"	1	—	47	—	2	—	—	—	—	Variations
1979	"Every Which Way but Loose"	1	30	26	32	1	47	4	28	41	Every Which Way but Loose (soundtrack)
1979	"Suspicions"	1	13	9	66	1	41	7	—	—	Loveline
1979	"Pour Me Another Tequila"	5	—	—	—	3	—	—	—	—	Loveline
"—" denotes releases that did not chart

=== 1980s ===
Year	Single	Peak chart positions									Certifications (sales threshold)	Album
Year	Single	US Country	US	US AC	AUS	CAN Country	CAN	CAN AC	NZ	UK	Certifications (sales threshold)	Album
1980	"Gone Too Far"	1	82	35	—	7	—	—	—	—		Loveline
1980	"Drivin' My Life Away"	1	5	3	100	2	45	2	22	—	US: Gold	Horizon
1980	"I Love a Rainy Night"	1	1	1	6	4	11	—	8	53	US: Gold	Horizon
1981	"Step by Step"	1	5	3	83	1	23	2	25	—		Step by Step
1981	"Someone Could Lose a Heart Tonight"	1	15	10	—	4	—	—	—	—		Step by Step
1982	"I Don't Know Where to Start"	2	35	9	—	13	—	—	—	—		Step by Step
1982	"You and I" (with Crystal Gayle)	1	7	2	81	1	35	1	—	81		Radio Romance
1983	"You Can't Run from Love"	1	55	2	—	1	—	4	—	—		Radio Romance
1983	"You Put the Beat in My Heart"	10	81	15	—	4	—	30	—	—		Greatest Hits Vol. II
1984	"Nothing Like Falling in Love"	10	—	38	—	1	—	—	—	—		Greatest Hits Vol. II
1984	"B-B-B-Burnin' Up with Love"	3	—	36	—	2	—	—	—	—		The Best Year of My Life
1985	"The Best Year of My Life"	1	—	—	—	1	—	—	—	—		The Best Year of My Life
1985	"Warning Sign"	4	—	—	—	3	—	—	—	—		The Best Year of My Life
1985	"She's Comin' Back to Say Goodbye"	6	—	—	—	22	—	—	—	—		The Best Year of My Life
1985	"A World Without Love"	10	—	35	—	27	—	—	—	—		Rabbitt Trax
1986	"Repetitive Regret"	4	—	—	—	5	—	—	—	—		Rabbitt Trax
1986	"Both to Each Other (Friends and Lovers)" (with Juice Newton)	1	—	—	—	1	—	—	—	—		Rabbitt Trax
1986	"Gotta Have You"	9	—	—	—	6	—	—	—	—		Rabbitt Trax
1988	"I Wanna Dance with You"	1	—	—	—	1	—	—	—	—		I Wanna Dance with You
1988	"The Wanderer"	1	—	—	—	1	—	—	—	—		I Wanna Dance with You
1988	"We Must Be Doin' Somethin' Right"	7	—	—	—	2	—	—	—	—		I Wanna Dance with You
1989	"That's Why I Fell in Love with You"	66	—	—	—	65	—	—	—	—		I Wanna Dance with You
1989	"On Second Thought"	1	—	—	—	1	—	—	—	—		Jersey Boy
"—" denotes releases that did not chart

=== 1990s ===
Year	Single	Peak chart positions		Album
Year	Single	US Country	CAN Country	Album
1990	"Runnin' with the Wind"	8	6	Jersey Boy
1990	"It's Lonely Out Tonite"	32	32	Jersey Boy
1990	"American Boy"	11	—	Jersey Boy
1991	"Tennessee Born and Bred"	58	82	Jersey Boy
1991	"Hang Up the Phone"	50	87	Ten Rounds
1992	"You Look Like an Angel"	—	—	Ten Rounds
1995	"I Made a Promise" (with Crystal Gayle)	—	—	Gordy (soundtrack)
1998	"Love May Never Pass This Way Again"	—	—	Beatin' the Odds
"—" denotes releases that did not chart

== Music videos ==
Year	Video	Director
1988	"The Wanderer"	Jack Cole
1989	"On Second Thought"	Steve Boyle
1991	"Tennessee Born and Bred"	Greg Crutcher
1995	"I Made a Promise" (with Crystal Gayle)	
