= The Best of Eddie Rabbitt =

Greatest hits album by Eddie Rabbitt
- Released: 1979
- Genre: Country
- Length: 28:12
- Label: Elektra
- Producer: David Malloy, Snuff Garrett

Eddie Rabbitt chronology
Variations (1978)	The Best of Eddie Rabbitt (1979)	Loveline (1979)

The Best of Eddie Rabbitt is the first compilation album by American country music artist Eddie Rabbitt. It was released in 1979 via Elektra Records.

== Track listing ==
No.	Title	Writer(s)	Length
1.	"Drinkin' My Baby (Off My Mind)"	Eddie Rabbitt, Even Stevens	2:23
2.	"Rocky Mountain Music"	Rabbitt	3:33
3.	"Do You Right Tonight"	Rabbitt, Stevens	2:30
4.	"Two Dollars in the Jukebox"	Rabbitt	2:22
5.	"I Can't Help Myself"	Rabbitt, Stevens	3:10
6.	"We Can't Go On Living Like This"	Rabbitt, Stevens	3:29
7.	"Hearts on Fire"	Rabbitt, Stevens, Dan Tyler	2:34
8.	"You Don't Love Me Anymore"	Alan Ray, Jeff Raymond	3:19
9.	"I Just Want to Love You"	Rabbitt, Stevens, David Malloy	4:01
10.	"Every Which Way but Loose"	Steve Dorff, Snuff Garrett, Milton Brown	2:51

== Chart performance ==
Chart (1979)	Peak position
US Top Country Albums (Billboard)	12
US Billboard 200	151
Canadian RPM Country Albums	4
