= Beatin' the Odds (Eddie Rabbitt album) =

Studio album by Eddie Rabbitt
- Released: September 23, 1997
- Recorded: 1997
- Studios: American JTM Studio, Quad Studios and Sound Stage Studios (Nashville, Tennessee)
- Genre: Country
- Length: 40:55
- Label: Intersound
- Producers: Tim Kish; Eddie Rabbitt

Eddie Rabbitt chronology
Ten Rounds (1991)	Beatin' the Odds (1997)	Songs from Rabbittland (1998)

Professional ratings
Review scores
Source	Rating
Allmusic	4/5 stars

Beatin' the Odds is the fourteenth studio album by country artist Eddie Rabbitt, released in 1997 by Intersound Records. The album was recorded by Rabbitt after undergoing chemotherapy and having had a part of his lung removed to combat cancer. It was released eight months before his death. It included six new songs and six re-recordings of past hits including "I Love a Rainy Night" and "Drivin' My Life Away" from Horizon, "On Second Thought" and "American Boy" from Jersey Boy, "Two Dollars in the Jukebox" from Rocky Mountain Music and "Suspicions" from Loveline.

Despite Rabbitt's condition, Allmusic gave the album four stars and commented that "his vocal talent shines as brightly in this full-length offering as in any of the many others he completed during his long career."

== Track listing ==
1. "Great Old American Town" (Eddie Rabbitt, Jenny Yates) - 3:53
2. "It's Me I'm Runnin' From" (Tim Nichols, Rabbitt) - 3:21
3. "I'll Make Everything Alright" (Robert Ellis Orrall, Rabbitt) - 2:33
4. "You've Come to the Right Heart" (Nichols, Rabbitt) - 3:49
5. "Love May Never Pass This Way Again" (Roger Cook, Rabbitt) - 3:26
6. "I'm There" (Rabbitt, Jimmy Hyde) - 3:24
7. "Drivin' My Life Away" (David Malloy, Rabbitt, Even Stevens) - 3:17
8. "Suspicions" (Malloy, Randy McCormick, Rabbitt, Stevens) - 4:58
9. "Two Dollars in the Jukebox" (Rabbitt) - 2:23
10. "I Love a Rainy Night" (Malloy, Rabbitt, Stevens) - 3:13
11. "On Second Thought" (Rabbitt) - 3:37
12. "American Boy" (Rabbitt) - 3:12

== Personnel ==
- Eddie Rabbitt – lead vocals, backing vocals, acoustic guitar
- Gary Prim – keyboards
- Larry Byrom – electric guitar
- Chris Leuzinger – acoustic guitar, electric guitar
- Sonny Garrish – pedal steel guitar
- Mike Brignardello – bass
- Milton Sledge – drums
- Aubrey Haynie – fiddle
- Jim Horn – flute
- Michael Black – backing vocals (2, 8)
- Kim Morrison – backing vocals (2, 8)

=== Production ===
- Eddie Rabbitt – producer
- Tim Kish – producer, track recording, overdub recording, mixing, mastering
- Terry Alldaffer – tracking assistant, overdub assistant
- Thomas Johnson – tracking assistant
- Randy LeRoy – mastering
- Final Stage Mastering (Nashville, Tennessee) – mastering location
- John Scarpati – photography
- Scott Larsen – graphic design
