= Step by Step =

Step by Step may refer to:

== Film and television ==
- Step by Step (1946 film), an American film directed by Phil Rosen
- Step by Step (2002 film), a Belgian film directed by Philippe Blasband
- Step by Step (TV series), a 1990s American sitcom

=== Television episodes ===
- "Step by Step" (Cyberchase)
- "Step by Step" (Heartland)
- "Step by Step" (Holmes on Homes)
- "Step by Step" (Merseybeat)

== Music ==
=== Albums ===
- Step by Step (Chisato Moritaka album), 1994
- Step by Step (Eddie Rabbitt album) or the title song (see below), 1981
- Step by Step (Linda George album), 1975
- Step by Step (New Kids on the Block album) or the title song (see below), 1990
- Step by Step: The Greatest Hits or the title song, by Wet Wet Wet, 2013
- Step by Step, by Peter Tork and Shoe Suede Blues, 2013
- Step by Step, by Stephanie Cheng, 2004
- Step by Step, by Tommy Smith, 1988

=== Songs ===
- "Step by Step" (Annie Lennox song), 1992; covered by Whitney Houston, 1997
- "Step by Step" (Ayumi Hamasaki song), 2015
- "Step by Step" (Braxe + Falcon song), 2022
- "Step by Step" (Eddie Rabbitt song), 1981
- "Step by Step" (New Kids on the Block song), 1990
- "Step by Step" (Silver Pozzoli song), 1985
- "Step by Step", by the Alan Parsons Project from Eye in the Sky, 1982
- "Step by Step", by BoyNextDoor from No Genre, 2025
- "Step by Step", by the Crests, 1960
- "Step by Step", by Joe Simon from The Power of Joe Simon, 1973
- "Step by Step", by Rich Mullins from The World as Best as I Remember It, 1991
- "Step by Step", by Sia, 2018
- "Step by Step", by Slushii from Out of Light, 2017
- "Step by Step", a theme song from the anime Case Closed, 1996

== Other uses ==
- Strowger switch or step-by-step, an early electromechanical telephone switching system
- Step by Step, a 1989 exhibition and book of photography by Sirkka-Liisa Konttinen
