= Pure Love =

Pure Love may refer to:

== Film and TV ==
- Pure Love (2013 TV series), a South Korean television series
- Pure Love (2014 TV series), a Philippine television series
- Pure Love (film), a 2016 South Korean film
- Loveshhuda (transl. Pure Love), a 2016 Indian Hindi-language film

== Music ==
- Pure Love (band), English-American rock band
- Pure Love (album), 1974 album by Ronnie Milsap
- "Pure Love" (Ronnie Milsap song), 1974
- "Pure Love" (Arash song), 2008
- "Pure Love", a 2013 single by Bomba Estéreo

== See also ==
- Love
