= B-B-B-Burnin' Up with Love =

"B-B-B-Burnin' Up With Love"

Single by Eddie Rabbitt

from the album The Best Year of My Life
- B-side: "747"
- Released: May 19, 1984
- Genre: Country
- Length: 2:31
- Label: Warner Bros. Nashville
- Songwriter(s): Eddie Rabbitt; Even Stevens; Billy Joe Walker Jr.
- Producer(s): Even Stevens; Eddie Rabbitt

Eddie Rabbitt singles chronology
"Nothing Like Falling in Love" (1984)	"B-B-B-Burnin' Up With Love" (1984)	"The Best Year of My Life" (1984)

"B-B-B-Burnin' Up with Love" is a song co-written and recorded by American country music artist Eddie Rabbitt. It was released in May 1984 as the first single from the album The Best Year of My Life. The song reached number 3 on the Billboard Hot Country Singles & Tracks chart. It was written by Rabbitt, Even Stevens and Billy Joe Walker Jr.

== Chart performance ==
Chart (1984)	Peak position
US Hot Country Songs (Billboard)	3
US Adult Contemporary (Billboard)	36
Canadian RPM Country Tracks	2
