= She's Comin' Back to Say Goodbye =

Single by Eddie Rabbitt

from the album The Best Year of My Life
- B-side: "Dial That Telephone"
- Released: July 13, 1985
- Genre: Country
- Length: 3:05
- Label: Warner Bros. Nashville
- Songwriter(s): Eddie Rabbitt; Even Stevens
- Producer(s): Even Stevens; Eddie Rabbitt; Jimmy Bowen

Eddie Rabbitt singles chronology
"Warning Sign" (1985)	"She's Comin' Back to Say Goodbye" (1985)	"A World Without Love" (1985)

"She's Comin' to Say Goodbye" is a song co-written and recorded by American country music artist Eddie Rabbitt. It was released in July 1985 as the fourth single from the album The Best Year of My Life. The song reached number 6 on the Billboard Hot Country Singles & Tracks chart. It was written by Rabbitt and Even Stevens.

== Chart performance ==
Chart (1985)	Peak position
US Hot Country Songs (Billboard)	6
Canadian RPM Country Tracks	22
