= Jersey Boys (disambiguation) =

Jersey Boys is a musical based on the songs of the Four Seasons.

Jersey Boy or Jersey Boys may also refer to:

== People ==
- Enzo Amore and Colin Cassady, a professional wrestling tag team known as "The Jersey Boys"

== Film ==
- Jersey Boys (film), a 2014 adaptation of the eponymous 2005 jukebox musical

== Music ==
- Jersey Boy (1990), the 12th studio album by country artist Eddie Rabbitt
- Jersey Boys: Original Broadway Cast Recording, an album of songs from the 2005 musical

== See also ==
- Jersey Girl (disambiguation)
- Jersey Girls
