= Gone Too Far (Eddie Rabbitt song) =

Single by Eddie Rabbitt

from the album Loveline
- B-side: "Loveline"
- Released: February 1980
- Genre: Country
- Length: 3:27
- Label: Elektra
- Songwriters: David Malloy; Eddie Rabbitt; Even Stevens
- Producer: David Malloy

Eddie Rabbitt singles chronology
"Pour Me Another Tequila" (1979)	"Gone Too Far" (1980)	"Drivin' My Life Away" (1980)

"Gone Too Far" is a song co-written and recorded by American country music artist Eddie Rabbitt. It was released in February 1980 as the third single from the album Loveline. The song was Rabbitt's sixth number one on the country chart. The single stayed at number one for a single week and spent a total of ten weeks on the country chart. It was written by Rabbitt, Even Stevens and David Malloy.

== Charts ==
=== Weekly charts ===
Chart (1980)	Peak position
Canada Country Singles (RPM)	7
US Hot Country Songs (Billboard)	1
US Billboard Hot 100	82
US Adult Contemporary (Billboard)	35
US Cash Box Top 100	95

=== Year-end charts ===
Chart (1980)	Position
US Hot Country Songs (Billboard)	26
