= Variations (Eddie Rabbitt album) =

Studio album by Eddie Rabbitt
- Released: March 14, 1978
- Studios: Quadrafonic Sound (Nashville, Tennessee)
- Genres: Country pop, country rock
- Label: Elektra
- Producer: David Malloy

Eddie Rabbitt chronology
| Rabbitt (1977) | Variations (1978) | The Best of Eddie Rabbitt (1979) |

Singles from Variations
- 1. "Hearts on Fire" Released: February 18, 1978; 2. "You Don't Love Me Anymore" Released: May 1978; 3. "I Just Want to Love You" Released: October 1978

Professional ratings
Review scores
| Source | Rating |
|---|---|
| AllMusic | 3/5 stars |

Variations is the fourth studio album by American country music artist Eddie Rabbitt. It was released in 1978 under the Elektra Records label. The album produced three singles: "Hearts on Fire", which peaked at number two on the country charts, and two country number one hits: "You Don't Love Me Anymore", which also peaked at 18 on Adult Contemporary charts; and "I Just Want to Love You". "Kentucky Rain", a song co-written by the artist and originally recorded by Elvis Presley in 1970, was also included on the album.

Rabbitt's father, Thomas Rabbitt, plays Irish fiddle on "Song of Ireland".

== Track listing ==
| No. | Title | Writer(s) | Length |
|---|---|---|---|
| 1. | "Hearts on Fire" | Eddie Rabbitt, Even Stevens, Dan Tyler | 2:33 |
| 2. | "The Room at the Top of the Stairs" | Tyler, Stevens | 3:42 |
| 3. | "Crossin' the Mississippi" | Rabbitt, Stevens | 2:54 |
| 4. | "Plain as the Pain on My Face" | Rabbitt, Stevens | 2:21 |
| 5. | "Hurtin' for You" | Rabbitt, Stevens, David Malloy | 3:20 |
| 6. | "You Don't Love Me Anymore" | Alan Ray, Jeff Raymond | 3:20 |
| 7. | "Kentucky Rain" | Rabbitt, Dick Heard | 3:56 |
| 8. | "I Just Want to Love You" | Rabbitt, Stevens, Malloy | 4:10 |
| 9. | "Caroline" | Rabbitt, Stevens, Malloy | 3:12 |
| 10. | "Song of Ireland" | Rabbitt, Stevens, Malloy | 4:31 |

== Personnel ==
- Eddie Rabbitt – lead vocals, harmony vocals, acoustic guitars
- Hargus "Pig" Robbins – pianos
- John Christopher – acoustic guitars
- Michael Spriggs – acoustic guitars
- Bobby Thompson – acoustic guitars
- Steve Gibson – electric guitars
- Chris Leuzinger – electric guitars
- Reggie Young – electric guitars
- Sonny Garrish – steel guitar
- Joe Osborn – bass
- Norbert Putnam – bass
- Jack Williams – bass
- Buster Phillips – drums
- Lisa Silver – fiddle
- Thomas Rabbitt – Irish fiddle (10)
- David Briggs – string arrangements
- David Campbell – string arrangements
- Jackie Cusic – backing vocals
- Janie Fricke – backing vocals
- Diane Tidwell – backing vocals
- Bergen White – backing vocals

=== Production ===
- David Malloy – producer
- Gene Eichelberger – engineer
- James Stroud – assistant engineer
- Quadrafonic Studios – recording location
- Glenn Meadows – mastering at Masterfonics (Nashville, Tennessee)
- Ron Coro – design
- Jim Shea – photography

== Charts ==
=== Weekly charts ===
| Chart (1978) | Peak position |
|---|---|
| US Billboard 200 | 143 |
| US Top Country Albums (Billboard) | 9 |

=== Year-end charts ===
| Chart (1979) | Position |
|---|---|
| US Top Country Albums (Billboard) | 43 |

=== Singles ===
| Year | Song | Chart | Position |
|---|---|---|---|
| 1978 | "Hearts on Fire" | Hot Country Singles | 2 |
| 1978 | "You Don't Love Me Anymore" | Hot Country Singles | 1 |
| 1978 | "I Just Want To Love You" | Hot Country Singles | 1 |
