= You Don't Love Me Anymore =

You Don't Love Me Anymore may refer to:

- "You Don't Love Me Anymore" (Eddie Rabbitt song)
- "You Don't Love Me Anymore" ("Weird Al" Yankovic song)
