= Beatin' the Odds =

Beatin' the Odds may refer to:

- Beatin' the Odds (Molly Hatchet album), 1980
- Beatin' the Odds (Eddie Rabbitt album), 1997
