= Eddie Rabbitt (album) =

Studio album by Eddie Rabbitt
- Released: August 1975
- Recorded: 1975
- Genre: Country
- Label: Elektra
- Producer: David Malloy

Eddie Rabbitt chronology
Eddie Rabbitt (1975)	Rocky Mountain Music (1976)

Professional ratings
Review scores
Source	Rating
Allmusic	3.5/5 stars

Eddie Rabbitt is the debut studio album by American country music artist Eddie Rabbitt, released in 1975 under the Elektra Records label. The album produced three singles: "You Get to Me", "Forgive and Forget", and "I Should Have Married You". The latter two both reached the top 15 in country music charts. Also included on the album was "Pure Love", a song written by Rabbitt that had been originally recorded by Ronnie Milsap the previous year.

== Track listing ==
=== Side A ===
No.	Title	Writer(s)	Length
1.	"Love Me to Sleep"	Eddie Rabbitt	2:56
2.	"Forgive and Forget"	Rabbitt, Even Stevens	3:14
3.	"Long Gone""	Rabbitt	2:53
4.	"Pure Love"	Rabbitt	2:26
5.	"When I Was Young"	Rabbitt	3:59

== Track listing ==
=== Side B ===
No.	Title	Writer(s)	Length
6.	"Savin' My Love for My Baby"	Rabbitt	1:53
7.	"I Should Have Married You"	Rabbitt, Stevens	3:13
8.	"Sweet Janine"	Rabbitt	3:51
9.	"You Get to Me"	Rabbitt	2:45
10.	"It Just Ain't Hit Me Yet"	Rabbitt, Stevens	2:52
11.	"Leavin'"	Rabbitt, Stevens	2:27

== Chart positions ==
Chart (1975)	Peak position
U.S. Top Country Albums	41

=== Singles ===
Year	Song	Chart	Position
1974	"You Get To Me"	Hot Country Singles	34
1975	"Forgive and Forget"	Hot Country Singles	12
1975	"I Should Have Married You"	Hot Country Singles	11
