= A Rose by Any Other Name =

A Rose by Any Other Name may refer to:

- "A rose by any other name would smell as sweet", a quotation from the play Romeo and Juliet by William Shakespeare
- A Rose by Any Other Name (album), by the country music artist Ronnie Milsap
- A Rose, By Any Other Name, a music project of Josh Scogin
- Rose by Any Other Name..., a modern romantic comedy film

== See also ==
- "Rose is a rose is a rose is a rose", a quotation from the 1913 poem Sacred Emily by Gertrude Stein
