= American Boy (disambiguation) =

"American Boy" is a 2008 song by Estelle.

American Boy may also refer to:

== Books ==
- The American Boy (magazine), a boy's magazine published 1899–1941
- American Boy, a novel by Larry Watson
- The American Boy, a novel by Andrew Taylor

== Film ==
- American Boy: A Profile of Steven Prince, a 1978 documentary film by Martin Scorsese

== Music ==
- "American Boy" (Kombinaciya song), a 1990 Russian pop song by Kombinaciya
- "American Boy" (Eddie Rabbitt song), a country song by Eddie Rabbitt
- "American Boy", a song by Chris Isaak from Always Got Tonight, 2002
- "American Boy", a 2018 song by Little Mix from LM5

== See also ==
- American Dad!
