= Warning Sign (disambiguation) =

Warning sign may refer to:

- A traffic warning sign is a type of sign which indicates a potential hazard, obstacle or condition requiring special attention
- Safety sign, a sign that warns of a hazard, prohibited action, required action or equipment, and locations of safety equipment or exits
- Hazard symbol, recognisable symbols designed to warn about hazardous or dangerous materials, locations, or objects
- Warning label, label attached to a product (such as chemicals or tobacco) warning the user about risks associated with its use

== Media ==
- Warning Sign (film), a 1985 American film directed by Hal Barwood
- "Warning Signs", an episode of the TV series The Walking Dead
- "Warning Sign" (song), by Eddie Rabbitt, 1985
- "Warning Sign", by Coldplay from A Rush of Blood to the Head, 2002
- "Warning Sign", by Nick Heyward, 1984
- "Warning Sign", by Talking Heads from More Songs About Buildings and Food, 1978
