= Jersey Girl =

Jersey Girl may refer to:

- Jersey Girls, the media name for four American women who lost their husbands in the September 11, 2001 terrorist attacks
- Jersey Girl (1992 film), an American romantic comedy starring Dylan McDermott and Jami Gertz
- Jersey Girl (2004 film), an American romantic comedy starring Ben Affleck and Liv Tyler
- "Jersey Girl" (song), a song composed and originally sung by American singer-songwriter Tom Waits

== See also ==
- Jersey Boy, a 1990 album by Eddie Rabbitt
- Jersey Boys (disambiguation)
