= Someone Could Lose a Heart Tonight =

Single by Eddie Rabbitt

from the album Step by Step
- B-side: "Nobody Loves Me Like My Baby"
- Released: November 1981
- Recorded: March 1981
- Genre: Country pop; adult contemporary
- Length: 3:26
- Label: Elektra
- Songwriters: David Malloy; Eddie Rabbitt; Even Stevens
- Producer: David Malloy

Eddie Rabbitt singles chronology
"Step by Step" (1981)	"Someone Could Lose a Heart Tonight" (1981)	"I Don't Know Where to Start" (1982)

"Someone Could Lose a Heart Tonight" is a song co-written and recorded by American country music artist Eddie Rabbitt. The song was written by Rabbitt, Even Stevens and David Malloy.

"Someone Could Lose a Heart Tonight" was released in November 1981 as the second single from the album Step by Step. The song went to number one for one week and spent a total of seventeen weeks on the country chart, becoming Rabbitt's tenth number one country single. "Someone Could Lose a Heart Tonight" also crossed over to the Top 40, peaking at number fifteen.

== Charts ==
=== Weekly charts ===
Chart (1981–1982)	Peak position
Canada Country Singles (RPM)	4
US Hot Country Songs (Billboard)	1
US Adult Contemporary (Billboard)	10
US Billboard Hot 100	15

=== Year-end charts ===
Chart (1982)	Position
US Hot Country Songs (Billboard)	45
