= The Best Year of My Life (song) =

Single by Eddie Rabbitt

from the album The Best Year of My Life
- B-side: "Over There"
- Released: September 1984
- Genre: Country
- Length: 3:12
- Label: Warner Bros. Nashville
- Songwriter(s): Eddie Rabbitt; Even Stevens
- Producer(s): Even Stevens; Eddie Rabbitt; Jimmy Bowen

Eddie Rabbitt singles chronology
"B-B-B-Burnin' Up with Love" (1984)	"The Best Year of My Life" (1984)	"Warning Sign" (1985)

"The Best Year of My Life" is a song co-written and recorded by American country music artist Eddie Rabbitt. It was released in September 1984 as the second single and title track from the album The Best Year of My Life. The single was Rabbitt's twelfth number one on the country chart. The single stayed at number one for one week and spent a total of fourteen weeks on the country chart. The song was written by Rabbitt and Even Stevens.

== Chart performance ==
Chart (1984–1985)	Peak position
US Hot Country Songs (Billboard)	1
Canadian RPM Country Tracks	1
