= Pour Me Another Tequila =

Single by Eddie Rabbitt

from the album Loveline
- B-side: "I Will Never Let You Go Again"
- Released: October 22, 1979
- Genre: Country
- Length: 3:26
- Label: Elektra
- Songwriter(s): Eddie Rabbitt; Even Stevens; David Malloy
- Producer(s): David Malloy

Eddie Rabbitt singles chronology
"Suspicions" (1979)	"Pour Me Another Tequila" (1979)	"Gone Too Far" (1980)

"Pour Me Another Tequila" is a song co-written and recorded by American country music artist Eddie Rabbitt. It was released in October 1979 as the second single from the album Loveline. The song reached number 5 on the Billboard Hot Country Singles & Tracks chart. It was written by Rabbitt, Even Stevens and David Malloy.

== Chart performance ==
Chart (1979–1980)	Peak position
US Hot Country Songs (Billboard)	5
Canadian RPM Country Tracks	3
