= A Rose by Any Other Name (album) =

A Rose By Any Other Name

Compilation album by Ronnie Milsap
- Released: 1975
- Genre: Country
- Length: 31:03
- Label: Warner Bros.
- Producers: Dan Penn, Chips Moman

Ronnie Milsap chronology
Legend in My Time (1975)	A Rose By Any Other Name (1975)	Night Things (1975)

Professional ratings
Review scores
Source	Rating
Allmusic	link

A Rose By Any Other Name is a compilation album by American country music artist Ronnie Milsap. It was released in 1975 by Warner Bros. Records. Five songs are from Ronnie Milsap, two songs were released as singles in 1970, and three songs were previously unreleased. "You And Me, Me And You" was recorded at Quadrophonic studios in Nashville, Produced by Glen Spreen.

The album reached #23 on the Country charts. Allmusic stated that the additions to the tracks from Ronnie Milsap "push[ed] the album closer toward country" than the debut but that it "doesn't hold together as well as the original debut." The publication described the album "as a fitfully entertaining record instead of a cohesive one."

== Track listing ==
No.	Title	Writer(s)	Source	Length
1.	"She Even Woke Me Up To Say Goodbye"	Doug Gilmore, Mickey Newbury	Previously unreleased	3:25
2.	"Please Don't Tell Me How the Story Ends"	Kris Kristofferson	Ronnie Milsap	3:00
3.	"You And Me, Me And You"	Will Jennings, Troy Seals	Previously unreleased	3:18
4.	"I Just Can't Help Believin'"	Barry Mann, Cynthia Weil	Previously unreleased	2:57
5.	"Keep On Smiling"	Karen Oldham, Spooner Oldham	Ronnie Milsap	3:21
6.	"A Rose By Any Other Name"	Irwin Levine, Toni Wine	Single from 1970	2:41
7.	"Crying"	Joe Melson, Roy Orbison	Ronnie Milsap	3:16
8.	"Blue Skies Of Montana"	S. Oldham, Dan Penn	Ronnie Milsap	3:25
9.	"Why"	Swain Schafer	Ronnie Milsap	3:03
10.	"Loving You's A Natural Thing"	Mark James, George Klein, Glen Spreen	Single from 1970	2:37

== Chart ==
Chart (1975)	Peak position
U.S. Top Country Albums	23
