= A Legend in My Time =

Studio album by Ronnie Milsap
- Released: 1975
- Studios: RCA Victor Studios, Nashville, Tennessee
- Genre: Country
- Length: 29:54
- Label: RCA Victor
- Producers: Tom Collins, Jack D. Johnson

Ronnie Milsap chronology
| Pure Love (1974) | A Legend in My Time (1975) | A Rose by Any Other Name (1975) |

Singles from A Legends in My Time
- 1. "(I'd Be) A Legend in My Time" Released: November 30, 1974; 2. "Too Late to Worry, Too Blue to Cry" Released: March 15, 1975

Professional ratings
Review scores
| Source | Rating |
|---|---|
| Allmusic | link |

A Legend in My Time is the fourth studio album by American country music artist Ronnie Milsap, released in 1975. Two singles were released from the album, including the Don Gibson penned "(I'd Be) A Legend in My Time," which reached No. 1 on country charts and Al Dexter's "Too Late to Worry, Too Blue to Cry", which peaked at #6.

The album reached No. 4 on Country charts and made its debut on the Billboard 200 chart, peaking at #138. Allmusic stated that the tempo was "switched up" "a little" from the previous album, marking it as having a bit more "variety." In 1975, it was named as the Country Music Association's Album of the Year.

== Track listing ==
| No. | Title | Writer(s) | Length |
|---|---|---|---|
| 1. | "Busiest Memory in Town" | Dennis Morgan | 2:49 |
| 2. | "Too Late to Worry, Too Blue to Cry" | Al Dexter | 3:05 |
| 3. | "(I'd Be) A Legend in My Time" | Don Gibson | 2:53 |
| 4. | "The Biggest Lie" | John Schweers | 2:27 |
| 5. | "Country Cookin'" | Ronnie Milsap | 3:54 |
| 6. | "She Came Here for the Change" | Bobby Barker, Charles Quillen | 2:56 |
| 7. | "I'll Leave This World Loving You" | Wayne Kemp, Mack Vickery | 2:43 |
| 8. | "I'm Still Not Over You" | Milsap | 2:50 |
| 9. | "I Honestly Love You" | Jeff Barry, Peter Allen | 3:23 |
| 10. | "Clap Your Hands" | Kent Robbins | 2:54 |

== Personnel ==
- Ronnie Milsap - lead vocals
- The Nashville Edition - backing vocals
- Bobby Thompson - banjo
- Mike Leech - bass
- Kenny Malone - drums
- Jim Buchanan, Tommy Williams - fiddle
- Harold Bradley, Jimmy Capps, Steve Gibson, Glenn Keener, Jerry Shook, Chip Young - guitar
- Charlie McCoy - harmonica
- Ronnie Milsap, Hargus "Pig" Robbins, Jay Spell - piano
- Pete Drake, Lloyd Green, John Hughey - steel guitar
- Bergen White - string arrangements (tracks 2,3,7,9)
- Joe Zinkan - upright bass
- Charlie McCoy, Farrell Morris - vibraphone

Technical

- Al Pachucki, Bill Vandervort - recording engineer
- Raeanne Rubenstein - photography

== Charts ==
| Chart (1975) | Peak position |
|---|---|
| U.S. Top Country Albums | 4 |

=== Singles ===
| Year | Song | US Country |
|---|---|---|
| 1974 | "(I'd Be) a Legend in My Time | 1 |
| 1975 | "Too Late to Worry, Too Blue to Cry" | 6 |
