= I Can't Help Myself (Eddie Rabbitt song) =

Single by Eddie Rabbitt

from the album Rabbitt
- B-side: "She Loves Me Like She Means It"
- Released: April 2, 1977
- Genre: Country
- Length: 3:12
- Label: Elektra
- Songwriter(s): Eddie Rabbitt; Even Stevens
- Producer(s): David Malloy

Eddie Rabbitt singles chronology
"Two Dollars in the Jukebox" (1976)	"I Can't Help Myself" (1977)	"We Can't Go On Living Like This" (1977)

"I Can't Help Myself" is a song co-written and recorded by American country music artist Eddie Rabbitt. Even Stevens shares a co-writing credit. It was released in April 1977 as the first single from the album Rabbitt. The song reached number 2 on the Billboard Hot Country Singles & Tracks chart.

== Chart performance ==
Chart (1977)	Peak position
US Hot Country Songs (Billboard)	2
US Billboard Hot 100	71
Canadian RPM Country Tracks	5
