= Runnin' with the Wind =

Single by Eddie Rabbitt

from the album Jersey Boy
- B-side: "Feel Like a Stranger"
- Released: April 7, 1990
- Genre: Country
- Length: 4:06
- Label: Capitol
- Songwriters: Eddie Rabbitt; Reed Nielsen
- Producer: Richard Landis

Eddie Rabbitt singles chronology
"On Second Thought" (1989)	"Runnin' with the Wind" (1990)	"It's Lonely Out Tonite" (1990)

"Runnin' with the Wind" is a song co-written and recorded by American country music artist Eddie Rabbitt. It was released in April 1990 as the second single from the album Jersey Boy. The song reached number 8 on the Billboard Hot Country Singles & Tracks chart. It was written by Rabbitt and Reed Nielsen.

== Chart performance ==
Chart (1990)	Peak position
Canada Country Singles (RPM)	6
US Hot Country Songs (Billboard)	8

=== Year-end charts ===
Chart (1990)	Position
Canada Country Tracks (RPM)	75
