= I Wanna Dance with You =

Studio album by Eddie Rabbitt
- Released: March 1, 1988
- Recorded: 1987
- Studios: Treasure Isle Recorders, The Money Pit, The Garage Studio and Sixteenth Avenue Sound (Nashville, Tennessee); Ocean Way Recording and The Grey Room (Hollywood, California)
- Genre: Country
- Length: 33:28
- Label: RCA Records
- Producer: Richard Landis

Eddie Rabbitt chronology
Rabbitt Trax (1986)	I Wanna Dance with You (1988)	Jersey Boy (1990)

Singles from I Wanna Dance with You
- 1. "I Wanna Dance with You" Released: January 1988; 2. "We Must Be Doin' Somethin' Right" Released: October 8, 1988; 3. "That's Why I Fell in Love with You" Released: May 13, 1989

I Wanna Dance with You is the eleventh studio album by American country music artist Eddie Rabbitt, released by RCA Records in 1988. The album produced four singles including the title track, a cover of Dion DiMucci's 1961 hit "The Wanderer", "We Must Be Doin' Somethin' Right" and "That's Why I Fell in Love with You". The first two singles both topped the country charts.

== Track listing ==
No.	Title	Writer(s)	Length
1.	"I Wanna Dance with You"	Eddie Rabbitt, Billy Joe Walker Jr.	3:10
2.	"She's an Old Cadillac"	Rabbitt	3:24
3.	"The Wanderer"	Ernie Maresca	3:22
4.	"We Must Be Doin' Somethin' Right"	Rabbitt, Reed Nielsen	3:35
5.	"That's Why I Fell in Love with You"	Rabbitt, Walker, Even Stevens	2:46
6.	"He's a Cheater"	Rabbitt, Nielsen	4:11
7.	"Rhonda"	Rabbitt, Stevens	4:26
8.	"Workin' Out"	Rabbitt, Stevens, Richard Landis	3:50
9.	"I Don't Worry 'Bout You"	Rabbitt, Stevens, Randy McCormick	4:23

== Personnel ==
- Eddie Rabbitt – lead vocals, harmony vocals, guitars
- Philip Aaberg – keyboards
- Jim Lang – keyboards
- Rhett Lawrence – keyboards
- Randy McCormack – keyboards
- Larry Williams – keyboards
- Larry Byrom – guitars
- George Doering – guitars
- Vince Gill – guitars
- Brent Rowan – guitars
- Billy Joe Walker Jr. – guitars
- David Hungate – bass
- James Stroud – drums
- Joel Peskin – saxophone solos
- Charles Calello – arrangements
- Alex Brown – backing vocals
- Marlena Jeter – backing vocals
- Jon Joyce – backing vocals
- Herb Pedersen – backing vocals
- Joe Pizzulo – backing vocals
- Sandy Simmons – backing vocals

=== Production ===
- Richard Landis – producer
- Csaba Pectoz – recording (1–3, 5–9)
- Tom Singers – engineer (4)
- John David Parker – recording assistant (1–3, 5–9)
- Mike Poole – recording assistant (1–3, 5–9)
- Jim Dineen – overdub recording
- Clark Schleicher – overdub assistant
- Rick Ruggieri – horn and string recording
- Ed Thacker – mixing at The Grey Room
- Wally Traugott – mastering at Capitol Mastering (Hollywood, California)
- Bill Brunt – art direction
- Mary Hamilton – art direction
- Lynn Goldsmith – photography

== Chart performance ==
=== Album ===
Chart (1988)	Peak position
U.S. Billboard Top Country Albums	34

=== Singles ===
Year	Single	Peak positions	
Year	Single	US Country	CAN Country
1988	"I Wanna Dance with You"	1	1
1988	"The Wanderer"	1	1
1988	"We Must Be Doin' Somethin' Right"	7	*
1989	"That's Why I Fell in Love with You"	66	65
