= Ten Rounds (Eddie Rabbitt album) =

Studio album by Eddie Rabbitt
- Released: August 27, 1991
- Recorded: 1991
- Studios: The Music Mill and MasterMix (Nashville, Tennessee)
- Genre: Country
- Length: 35:38
- Label: Capitol Records
- Producer: Richard Landis

Eddie Rabbitt chronology
Jersey Boy (1990)	Ten Rounds (1991)	Beatin' the Odds (1997)

Ten Rounds is the thirteenth studio album by country artist Eddie Rabbitt, released in 1991 by Capitol Records. The album produced one single, "Hang Up the Phone", which was the last charting single of his career. The track "747" had previously appeared on Rabbitt's 1980 album Horizon.

Rabbitt wrote the song "C-Rap (Country Rap)" in response to his dissatisfaction with rap music.

== Track listing ==
All tracks written by Eddie Rabbitt; "You Look Like an Angel" and "I'll Get Along Without You Just Fine" co-written by Reed Nielsen.

1. "747" – 3:08
2. "You Look Like an Angel" – 3:28
3. "I'll Get Along Without You Just Fine" – 3:27
4. "Hang Up the Phone" – 3:09
5. "Sorry That I'm Sorry Again" – 2:35
6. "C-Rap (Country Rap)" – 3:03
7. "You Are Everything to Me" – 3:35
8. "Destiny" – 4:09
9. "Will We Ever Love Again" – 4:09
10. "Wish I Had Somebody to Love" – 4:33

== Personnel ==
Compiled from liner notes.

=== Musicians ===
- Eddie Rabbitt – lead vocals, backing vocals
- David Briggs – acoustic piano, synthesizers
- Richard Landis – organ
- Joey Miskulin – accordion
- Steve Gibson – electric guitars
- Brent Mason – electric guitars
- Billy Joe Walker, Jr. – acoustic guitars
- Paul Franklin – steel guitar
- David Hungate – bass
- Paul Leim – drums, drum programming
- Terry McMillan – harmonica, percussion
- Glen Duncan – fiddle

=== Production ===
- Richard Landis – producer
- Jim Cotton – digital recording, mixing
- Grahame Smith – recording assistant
- Joe Scaife – mixing
- Greg Parker – mix assistant
- Hank Williams – mastering
- Kate Haggerty – project coordinator
- Virginia Team – art direction
- Jerry Joyner – design
- Slick Lawson – photography
- Moress Nanas Golden Entertainment – management

== Charts ==
Singles
Year	Song	US Country
1991	"Hang Up the Phone"	50
