= Tennessee Born and Bred =

1990 song by Eddie Rabbit

Single by Eddie Rabbitt

from the album Jersey Boy
- Released: 1991
- Genre: Country
- Length: 3:09
- Label: Capitol
- Songwriters: Eddie Rabbitt; Reed Nielsen
- Producer: Richard Landis

Eddie Rabbitt singles chronology
"American Boy" (1990)	"Tennessee Born and Bred" (1991)	"Hang Up the Phone" (1991)

"Tennessee Born and Bred" is a song recorded by American country music artist Eddie Rabbitt and released in 1991 as the fifth and final single from his twelfth studio album Jersey Boy. The song was written by Rabbitt and Reed Nielsen, and produced by Richard Landis. The song reached number 58 on the Billboard Hot Country Singles & Tracks chart.

== Background ==
On March 16, 1991, Cash Box listed the song at number three on their top three 'most added singles' on country radio.

== Music video ==
The song's music video was directed by Greg Crutcher and produced by Carolyn Betts for Dream Ranch Pictures. It took a day to shoot at Smiley Hollow Barn, near Ridgetop, on 28 September 1990. The shoot required approximately 150 extras, with people openly invited via an advert in The Tennessean to turn up at the barn dressed in "orange and blue fall clothing". Rabbitt's wife makes an appearance in the video as the woman taking photographs.

== Critical reception ==
In a review of the single, Billboard described "Tennessee Born and Bred" as an "acoustic, bluegrass-sprinkled feast of sound" and "one of the most infectious songs Rabbitt has ever recorded". They praised the song's "breakneck speed", "good humor" and "sweet energy", but felt the lyrics contained clichés. Cash Box considered it a "snappy number" with "fun and excitement" and Rabbitt's "stinging vocals". They added, "...and if Rabbitt's firey-edge performance doesn't set you to a sizzle, the rootsy electricity which pours from excellent bluegrass-flavored instrumentation will!"

The Gavin Report described the track as a "light-hearted song [with] a spirited bluegrass feel". In a retrospective review of Jersey Boy, Charlotte Dillon of AllMusic picked "Tennessee Born and Bred" as a song that "Eddie Rabbitt fans might especially enjoy".

== Charts ==
Chart (1991)	Peak position
Canada Country Singles (RPM)	82
US Hot Country Songs (Billboard)	58
US Country Singles (Cash Box)	25
