= Forgive and Forget (Eddie Rabbitt song) =

1975 song by Eddie Rabbitt

Single by Eddie Rabbitt

from the album Eddie Rabbitt
- B-side: "Pure Love"
- Released: 1975
- Genre: Country
- Length: 3:12
- Label: Elektra
- Songwriters: Eddie Rabbitt; Even Stevens
- Producer: David Malloy

Eddie Rabbitt singles chronology
"You Get to Me" (1974)	"Forgive and Forget" (1975)	"I Should Have Married You" (1975)

"Forgive and Forget" is a song recorded by American country music artist Eddie Rabbitt and released in 1975 as the second single from his self-titled debut album. The song was written by Rabbitt and Even Stevens, and produced by David Malloy. It was Rabbitt's second country hit, reaching number 12 on the Billboard Hot Country Singles & Tracks chart.

== Critical reception ==
On its release as a single, Cash Box wrote, "Rabbitt steps out and strikes a blow for women with this soft, easy ballad, featuring rich vocals and excellent production."

== Charts ==
Chart (1975)	Peak position
Canada Country Singles (RPM)	21
US Hot Country Songs (Billboard)	12
US Top 100 Country (Cash Box)	14
