= Hang Up the Phone =

1991 song by Eddie Rabbitt

Single by Eddie Rabbitt

from the album Ten Rounds
- Released: 1991
- Genre: Country
- Length: 3:09
- Label: Capitol
- Songwriter: Eddie Rabbitt
- Producer: Richard Landis

Eddie Rabbitt singles chronology
"Tennessee Born and Bred" (1991)	"Hang Up the Phone" (1991)	"You Look Like an Angel" (1992)

"Hang Up the Phone" is a song recorded by American country music artist Eddie Rabbitt and released in 1991 as the lead single from his thirteenth studio album Ten Rounds. The song was written by Rabbitt and produced by Richard Landis. It was Rabbitt's final entry on the Billboard Hot Country Singles & Tracks chart, where it reached number 50.

== Background ==
Rabbitt has described "Hang Up the Phone" as a "country shuffle". He told the Star-Gazette in 1991, "I wrote it in the living room when the kids were playing around and picking up the phone. At one point, I said, 'Hang up the phone'."

On its release, "Hang Up the Phone" was met with some resistance by country radio. It was initially met with encouraging support and was gaining new adds throughout August. On September 7, 1991, the song was listed by Cash Box at number three on their top three 'high debuts' for country radio.

When the song reached no further than number 50 in the Billboard country charts, Rabbitt told the Miami Herald, "You have so many acts that come out at the same time and radio has only two or three slots to fill. It doesn't bother me, we'll get 'em with the next single."

== Critical reception ==
In a review of Ten Rounds, Billboard picked the "up-tempo" "Hang Up the Phone" as a "strong cut". Mario Tarradell of the Miami Herald described the song as being in the "traditional country vein" with lyrics about "saving a dying relationship". He considered it reminiscent of Rabbitt's 1990 chart-topper "On Second Thought".

Dennis Miller, writing for the Star-Gazette, considered the song to "sail gently along with a memorable tune and hook". Linda Lynn of The Daily Oklahoman considered "Hang Up the Phone" to be one of the "jumpier tune[s]" on the album.

== Charts ==
Chart (1991)	Peak position
Canada Country Singles (RPM)	87
US Hot Country Songs (Billboard)	50
US Top 100 Country Singles (Cash Box)	38
