= Where My Heart Is =

Studio album by Ronnie Milsap
- Released: September 1973
- Studio: RCA Victor Studios, Nashville, Tennessee
- Genre: Country
- Length: 27:39
- Label: RCA Victor
- Producer: Tom Collins, Jack D. Johnson

Ronnie Milsap chronology
Ronnie Milsap (1971)	Where My Heart Is (1973)	Pure Love (1974)

Professional ratings
Review scores
Source	Rating
Allmusic	4/5 stars

Where My Heart Is is the second studio album by American country music artist Ronnie Milsap. It was released in 1973 by RCA Records. It was Milsap's first album to chart, peaking at #5 on country album charts, and was his first to produce singles. The tracks "I Hate You" and "(All Together Now) Let's Fall Apart" both reached the top ten on country charts and the song "That Girl Who Waits on Tables" peaked at #11.

== Track listing ==
No.	Title	Writer(s)	Length
1.	"That Girl Who Waits on Tables"	Bobby Barker	2:57
2.	"I Hate You"	Dan Penn, Leroy Daniels	2:47
3.	"You're Stronger Than Me"	Hank Cochran, Jimmy Key	2:50
4.	"Branded Man"	Merle Haggard	3:06
5.	"Where Love Goes When It Dies"	Charles Quillen	2:37
6.	"Brothers, Strangers and Friends"	Dallas Frazier, A.L. "Doodle" Owens	3:06
7.	"(All Together Now) Let's Fall Apart"	Johnny Koonse	2:24
8.	"Comin' Down with Love"	James Bullington	2:26
9.	"Pass Me By (If You're Only Passing Through)"	Hillman Hall	2:51
10.	"You're Drivin' Me Out of Your Mind"	Koonse	2:35

== Charts ==
=== Weekly charts ===
Chart (1973)	Peak position
U.S. Top Country Albums	5

=== Singles ===
Year	Song	US Country
1973	"(All Together Now) Let's Fall Apart"	10
1973	"I Hate You"	10
1973	"That Girl Who Waits on Tables"	11
