= I Should Have Married You =

1975 song by Eddie Rabbitt

Single by Eddie Rabbitt

from the album Eddie Rabbitt
- B-side: "Sweet Janine"
- Released: 1975
- Genre: Country
- Length: 3:10
- Label: Elektra
- Songwriter(s): Eddie Rabbitt; Even Stevens
- Producer(s): David Malloy

Eddie Rabbitt singles chronology
"Forgive and Forget" (1975)	"I Should Have Married You" (1975)	"Drinkin' My Baby (Off My Mind)" (1976)

"I Should Have Married You" is a song recorded by American country music artist Eddie Rabbitt and released in 1975 as the third and final single from his self-titled debut album. The song was written by Rabbitt and Even Stevens, and produced by David Malloy. It was Rabbitt's third country hit, reaching number 11 on the Billboard Hot Country Singles & Tracks chart.

== Critical reception ==
On its release as a single, Cash Box noted the song's "strong lyric" and Malloy's "fine production".

== Charts ==
Chart (1975)	Peak position
US Hot Country Songs (Billboard)	11
US Top 100 Country (Cash Box)	11
