= Pure Love (album) =

Studio album by Ronnie Milsap
- Released: April 1974
- Studios: RCA Victor Studios, Nashville, Tennessee
- Genre: Country
- Length: 27:50
- Label: RCA Victor
- Producers: Tom Collins, Jack D. Johnson

Ronnie Milsap chronology
Where My Heart Is (1973)	Pure Love (1974)	A Legend in My Time (1975)

Singles from Pure Love
- 1. "Pure Love" Released: March 30, 1974; 2. "Please Don't Tell Me How the Story Ends" Released: July 20, 1974

Professional ratings
Review scores
Source	Rating
Allmusic	4.5/5 stars

Pure Love is the third studio album by American country music artist Ronnie Milsap, released in 1974 by RCA Records. The album produced two #1 hits for Milsap, including his first hit "Pure Love" penned by Eddie Rabbitt and "Please Don't Tell Me How the Story Ends," which marked his debut on the Billboard Hot 100 chart, peaking at #95.

Pure Love reached #8 on Country album charts. Allmusic described the album as having "a solid country foundation" highlighting "My Love Is Deep, My Love Is Wide" and "Blue Ridge Mountains Turnin' Green" as being among a "strong set of songs."

== Track listing ==
No.	Title	Writer(s)	Length
1.	"My Love Is Deep, My Love Is Wide"	Ben Peters	2:34
2.	"Amazing Love"	John Schweers	3:18
3.	"Pure Love"	Eddie Rabbitt	2:21
4.	"Four Walls"	George Campbell, Marvin Moore	3:06
5.	"Streets of Gold"	Jim Lunsford	2:15
6.	"Love the Second Time Around"	Schweers	3:02
7.	"Please Don't Tell Me How the Story Ends"	Kris Kristofferson	2:44
8.	"All My Roads (Lead Back to You)"	Bob Morrison	2:32
9.	"Behind Closed Doors"	Kenny O'Dell	2:53
10.	"Blue Ridge Mountains Turnin' Green"	Lunsford	3:05

== Charts ==
=== Weekly charts ===
Chart (1974)	Peak position
US Top Country Albums (Billboard)	8

=== Year-end charts ===
Chart (1974)	Position
US Top Country Albums (Billboard)	31

=== Singles ===
Year	Song	US Country
1974	"Pure Love"	1
1974	"Please Don't Tell Me How the Story Ends"	1
