= Hearts on Fire (Eddie Rabbitt song) =

Single by Eddie Rabbitt

from the album Variations
- B-side: "The Girl on My Mind"
- Released: February 18, 1978
- Genre: Country
- Length: 2:36
- Label: Elektra
- Songwriter(s): Eddie Rabbitt; Dan Tyler; Even Stevens
- Producer(s): David Malloy

Eddie Rabbitt singles chronology
"We Can't Go On Living Like This" (1978)	"Hearts on Fire" (1978)	"You Don't Love Me Anymore" (1978)

"Hearts on Fire" is a song co-written and recorded by American country music artist Eddie Rabbitt. It was released in February 1978 as the first single from the album Variations. The song reached number 2 on the Billboard Hot Country Singles & Tracks chart. It was written by Rabbitt, Dan Tyler and Even Stevens.

== Chart performance ==
Chart (1978)	Peak position
US Hot Country Songs (Billboard)	2
Canadian RPM Country Tracks	9
