= Loveline (Eddie Rabbitt album) =

Studio album by Eddie Rabbitt
- Released: May 9, 1979
- Studios: Muscle Shoals (Sheffield, Alabama); Village Recorder (Los Angeles, California); Woodland (Nashville, Tennessee); Capitol (Hollywood, California)
- Genres: Country, soft rock
- Label: Elektra
- Producer: David Malloy

Eddie Rabbitt chronology
The Best of Eddie Rabbitt (1979)	Loveline (1979)	Horizon (1980)

Singles from Loveline
- 1. "Suspicions" Released: May 1979; 2. "I Just Want to Love You" Released: October 1979

Professional ratings
Review scores
Source	Rating
Allmusic	3.5/5 stars

Loveline is the fifth studio album by American country music artist Eddie Rabbitt. It was released in 1979 under the Elektra Records label. The album produced three singles including "Suspicions", which reached number one on country charts, 13 on the Billboard 100 and 9 on the Adult Contemporary chart. The other singles included "Pour Me Another Tequila" and "Gone Too Far", which peaked at 5 and 1, respectively, on Country Charts. The song "I Don't Wanna Make Love (With Anyone But You)" previously appeared on Rabbitt's album Rocky Mountain Music and was re-recorded for this album.

Loveline reached number four on country album charts and received generally positive reviews. Allmusic retrospectively gave the album 3.5 stars out of 5 and praised it for its "R&B influence" and "disco feel" along with the track's "inspired melodies and unusual chord progressions."

The title song was later recorded by Dr. Hook; their version became their last entry on the Billboard Hot 100, reaching No. 60 in 1982.

== Track listing ==
No.	Title	Writer(s)	Length
1.	"Pour Me Another Tequila"	David Malloy, Eddie Rabbitt, Even Stevens	3:25
2.	"Gone Too Far"	Malloy, Rabbitt, Stevens	3:22
3.	"Loveline"	Malloy, Rabbitt, Stevens	3:28
4.	"One and Only One"	Paul Overstreet, Stevens, Rabbitt, Malloy	3:22
5.	"Suspicions"	Malloy, Randy McCormick, Rabbitt, Stevens	4:18
6.	"So Fine"	Malloy, Rabbitt, Stevens	3:20
7.	"I Will Never Let You Go Again"	Rabbitt, Stevens	3:52
8.	"Amazing Love"	Rabbitt, Dan Tyler, Malloy, Stevens	3:52
9.	"It's Always Like the First Time"	Rabbitt	3:51
10.	"I Don't Wanna Make Love (With Anyone But You)"	Rabbitt	4:45

== Personnel ==
- Eddie Rabbitt – lead vocals, backing vocals
- Randy McCormick – keyboards (1–8, 10), string arrangements
- Barry Beckett – keyboards (9)
- Larry Byrom – acoustic guitar, electric lead guitar (1–4, 6–10)
- Jimmy Johnson – electric rhythm guitar (1–4, 6–10)
- Tim May – electric guitar (5)
- Dennis Belfield – bass guitar
- Norbert Putnam – bass guitar (1, 3, 7, 9, 10)
- David Hood – bass guitar (2, 4, 6, 8)
- David Hungate – bass guitar (5)
- Roger Hawkins – drums
- Steve Forman – percussion
- Ernie Watts – flute (5)
- Larry Muhoberac – string arrangements
- Sherry Grooms – backing vocals
- Michelle Gruska – backing vocals
- Sara Taylor – backing vocals

=== Production ===
- David Malloy – producer, remixing
- Peter Granet – engineer, remixing
- Danny Hilley – engineer
- Bill Fair – assistant engineer
- Carla Frederick – assistant engineer
- Steve Hirsch – assistant engineer
- Mitchell Tannenbaum – assistant engineer
- David Yates – assistant engineer
- Darrell Johnson – mastering at JVC Cutting Center (Hollywood, California)
- Ron Coro – art direction
- Johnny Lee – art direction
- Lynn Goldsmith – front cover photography
- Aaron Rapoport – back cover photography
- Gerard Huerta – logo design

== Charts ==
=== Weekly charts ===
Chart (1979)	Peak position
US Billboard 200	91
US Top Country Albums (Billboard)	5

=== Year-end charts ===
Chart (1979)	Position
US Top Country Albums (Billboard)	28
Chart (1980)	Position
US Top Country Albums (Billboard)	27

=== Singles ===
Year	Song	US Country	US singles	US AC
1979	"Suspicions"	1	13	9
1979	"Pour Me Another Tequila"	5	-	-
1980	"Gone Too Far"	1	82	35
