= Rabbitt (album) =

Studio album by Eddie Rabbitt
- Released: May 24, 1977
- Studio: Quadrafonic Sound (Nashville, Tennessee)
- Genre: Country
- Label: Elektra
- Producer: David Malloy

Eddie Rabbitt chronology
Rocky Mountain Music (1976)	Rabbitt (1977)	Variations (1978)

Singles from Rabbitt
- 1. "I Can't Help Myself" Released: April 2, 1977; 2. "We Can't Go On Living Like This" Released: August 25, 1977

Professional ratings
Review scores
Source	Rating
Allmusic	4/5 stars

Rabbitt is the third studio album by American country music artist Eddie Rabbitt, released in 1977 under the Elektra Records label. The album produced the singles "We Can't Go on Living Like This" and "I Can't Help Myself" which peaked at 6 and 2, respectively, on the United States country singles chart.

Rabbitt was re-released along with his debut album Eddie Rabbitt in 2006.

== Track listing ==
No.	Title	Writer(s)	Length
1.	"I'm a Little Bit Lonesome"	Eddie Rabbitt	3:17
2.	"I Can't Help Myself"	Rabbitt, Even Stevens	3:10
3.	"Stop, Look and Listen"	Rabbitt, Stevens	2:47
4.	"The Girl on My Mind"	Rabbitt, Stevens, David Malloy	2:36
5.	"You Make Love Beautiful"	Rabbitt, Alan Ray, Malloy	2:40
6.	"Sure Thing"	Rabbitt, Stevens	2:48
7.	"Jewelry Store"	Alan Ray	3:22
8.	"We Can't Go On Living Like This"	Rabbitt, Stevens	3:30
9.	"Is There a Country Song on the Jukebox?"	Rabbitt	3:41
10.	"She Loves Me Like She Means It"	Rabbitt, Stevens, Malloy	2:46

== Personnel ==
- Eddie Rabbitt – lead vocals, harmony vocals, acoustic guitars
- Hargus "Pig" Robbins – pianos
- Shane Keister – synthesizers
- Michael Spriggs – acoustic guitars
- Bobby Thompson – acoustic guitars
- Steve Gibson – electric guitars
- Reggie Young – electric guitars
- Sonny Garrish – steel guitar
- Jack Williams – bass
- Larrie Londin – drums
- Kenny Malone – drums
- Farrell Morris – percussion
- David Briggs – string arrangements
- Mike Suttle – harmony vocals

=== Production ===
- David Malloy – producer
- Gene Eichelberger – engineer
- James Stroud – assistant engineer
- Quadrafonic Studios (Nashville, Tennessee) – recording location
- Glenn Meadows – mastering at Masterfonics (Nashville, Tennessee)
- Tony Lane – art direction
- Anne Blackford Garner – design
- Jonathan Exley – photography
- Michael Manoogian – logo design

== Chart positions ==
Chart (1977)	Peak position
U.S. Top Country Albums	4

=== Singles ===
Year	Song	Chart	Position
1977	"I Can't Help Myself"	Hot Country Singles	2
1977	"We Can't Go on Living Like This"	Hot Country Singles	6
