= I Don't Know Where to Start =

Single by Eddie Rabbitt

from the album Step by Step
- B-side: "Skip-a-Beat"
- Released: April 10, 1982
- Genre: Country
- Length: 3:26
- Label: Elektra
- Songwriter: Thom Schuyler
- Producer: David Malloy

Eddie Rabbitt singles chronology
"Someone Could Lose a Heart Tonight" (1981)	"I Don't Know Where to Start" (1982)	"You and I" (1982)

"I Don't Know Where to Start" is a song written by Thom Schuyler, and recorded by American country music artist Eddie Rabbitt. It was released in April 1982 as the third single from the album Step by Step. The song reached number 2 on the Billboard Hot Country Singles & Tracks chart and number 35 on the Billboard Hot 100, his last solo top-40 pop hit.

== Chart performance ==
Chart (1982)	Peak position
Canada Country Singles (RPM)	13
US Hot Country Songs (Billboard)	2
US Billboard Hot 100	35
US Adult Contemporary (Billboard)	9
