= I Wanna Dance with You (song) =

Single by Eddie Rabbitt

from the album I Wanna Dance with You
- B-side: "Gotta Have You"
- Released: January 1988
- Genre: Country
- Length: 3:15
- Label: RCA Victor
- Songwriters: Eddie Rabbitt; Billy Joe Walker Jr.
- Producer: Richard Landis

Eddie Rabbitt singles chronology
"Gotta Have You" (1986)	"I Wanna Dance with You" (1988)	"The Wanderer" (1988)

"I Wanna Dance with You" is a song co-written and recorded by American country music artist Eddie Rabbitt. It was released in January 1988 as the first single and title track from the album I Wanna Dance with You. The song was Eddie Rabbitt's thirteenth number one country single as a solo artist. The single went to number one for one week and spent a total of fourteen weeks on the country chart. It was written by Rabbitt and Billy Joe Walker Jr.

== Charts ==
=== Weekly charts ===
Chart (1988)	Peak position
US Hot Country Songs (Billboard)	1
Canadian RPM Country Tracks	1

=== Year-end charts ===
Chart (1988)	Position
US Hot Country Songs (Billboard)	14
