= 14th Academy of Country Music Awards =

US music awards ceremony in 1979

- Date: May 2, 1979
- Location: Hollywood Palladium, Los Angeles, California
- Hosted by: Roy Clark; Barbara Mandrell; Dennis Weaver

Highlights
- Most wins: Kenny Rogers; Oak Ridge Boys (2 each)
- Most nominations: Kenny Rogers (5)

Television/radio coverage
- Network: NBC

The 14th Academy of Country Music Awards ceremony was held on May 2, 1979, at the Hollywood Palladium, Los Angeles, California. It was hosted by Roy Clark, Barbara Mandrell and Dennis Weaver.

== Winners and nominees ==
Winners are shown in bold.

Entertainer of the Year	Top Male Vocalist of the Year
**Kenny Rogers**; Roy Clark; Loretta Lynn; Willie Nelson; Dolly Parton	**Kenny Rogers**; Larry Gatlin; Merle Haggard; Eddie Rabbitt; Don Williams
Top Female Vocalist of the Year	Top Vocal Group of the Year
**Barbara Mandrell**; Crystal Gayle; Loretta Lynn; Anne Murray; Dolly Parton	**Oak Ridge Boys**; Dave & Sugar; Statler Brothers; Conway Twitty and Loretta Lynn; Dottie West and Kenny Rogers
Single Record of the Year	Song of the Year
**"Tulsa Time"** — **Don Williams**; "Georgia on My Mind" — Willie Nelson; "Mammas Don't Let Your Babies Grow Up to Be Cowboys" — Waylon Jennings and Willie Nelson; "Out of My Head and Back in My Bed" — Loretta Lynn; "Talking in Your Sleep" — Crystal Gayle	**"You Needed Me"** — **Randy Goodrum**; "Burgers and Fries" — Ben Peters; "I'm Always on a Mountain When I Fall" — Chuck Howard; "Mammas Don't Let Your Babies Grow Up to Be Cowboys" — Ed Bruce, Patsy Bruce; "The Gambler" — Don Schlitz
Top New Male Vocalist	Top New Female Vocalist
**John Conlee**; Lee Dresser; Con Hunley; Ronnie McDowell; Kenny O'Dell	**Cristy Lane**; Susie Allanson; Zella Lehr; Charly McClain; Bonnie Tyler
Album of the Year
**Y'all Come Back Saloon — Oak Ridge Boys**; Every Time Two Fools Collide — Dottie West and Kenny Rogers; It Was Almost Like a Song — Ronnie Milsap; Let's Keep It That Way — Anne Murray; Stardust — Willie Nelson
Pioneer Award
**Eddie Dean**
Tex Ritter Award
**The Electric Horseman**
