= It's Lonely Out Tonite =

Single by Eddie Rabbitt

from the album Jersey Boy
- Released: August 4, 1990
- Genre: Country
- Length: 3:33
- Label: Capitol
- Songwriters: Eddie Rabbitt, Reed Nielsen
- Producer: Richard Landis

Eddie Rabbitt singles chronology
"Runnin' with the Wind" (1990)	"It's Lonely Out Tonite" (1990)	"American Boy" (1990)

"It's Lonely Out Tonite" is a song co-written and recorded by American country music artist Eddie Rabbitt. It was released in August 1990 as the third single from the album Jersey Boy. The song reached #32 on the Billboard Hot Country Singles & Tracks chart. The song was written by Rabbitt and Reed Nielsen.

== Chart performance ==
Chart (1990)	Peak position
US Hot Country Songs (Billboard)	32
Canadian RPM Country Tracks	32
