= Warning Sign (song) =

Single by Eddie Rabbitt

from the album The Best Year of My Life
- B-side: "Go to Sleep Big Bertha"
- Released: February 23, 1985
- Genre: Country
- Length: 3:14
- Label: Warner Bros. Nashville
- Songwriter(s): Eddie Rabbitt; Even Stevens
- Producer(s): Even Stevens; Eddie Rabbitt; Jimmy Bowen

Eddie Rabbitt singles chronology
"The Best Year of My Life" (1984)	"Warning Sign" (1985)	"She's Comin' Back to Say Goodbye" (1985)

"Warning Sign" is a song co-written and recorded by American country music artist Eddie Rabbitt. It was released in February 1985 as the third single from the album The Best Year of My Life. The song reached number 4 on the Billboard Hot Country Singles & Tracks chart. It was written by Rabbitt and Even Stevens.

== Chart performance ==
Chart (1985)	Peak position
US Hot Country Songs (Billboard)	4
Canadian RPM Country Tracks	3
