= We Can't Go On Living Like This =

Single by Eddie Rabbitt

from the album Rabbitt
- B-side: "You Make Love Beautiful"
- Released: August 20, 1977
- Genre: Country
- Length: 3:35
- Label: Elektra
- Songwriter(s): Eddie Rabbitt; Even Stevens
- Producer(s): David Malloy

Eddie Rabbitt singles chronology
| "I Can't Help Myself" (1977) | "We Can't Go On Living Like This" (1977) | "Hearts on Fire" (1978) |

"We Can't Go On Living Like This" is a song co-written and recorded by American country music artist Eddie Rabbitt. It was released in August 1977 as the second single from the album Rabbitt. The song reached number six on the Billboard Hot Country Singles & Tracks chart. It was written by Rabbitt and Even Stevens.

== Chart performance ==
| Chart (1977) | Peak position |
|---|---|
| US Hot Country Songs (Billboard) | 6 |
| Canadian RPM Country Tracks | 1 |
