= That's Why I Fell in Love with You =

Single by Eddie Rabbitt

from the album I Wanna Dance with You
- B-side: "She's an Old Cadillac"
- Released: April 28, 1989
- Genre: Country
- Length: 2:46
- Label: RCA Victor
- Songwriters: Billy Joe Walker Jr.; Even Stevens; Eddie Rabbitt
- Producer: Richard Landis

Eddie Rabbitt singles chronology
"We Must Be Doin' Somethin' Right" (1988)	"That's Why I Fell in Love with You" (1989)	"On Second Thought" (1989)

"That's Why I Fell in Love with You" is a song co-written and recorded by American country music singer Eddie Rabbitt. It was released in April 1989 as the fourth and final single from his eleventh studio album I Wanna Dance with You. The song was written by Billy Joe Walker Jr., Even Stevens and Rabbitt, and produced by Richard Landis.

== Background ==
After the number one chart successes with the first two singles from I Wanna Dance with You, "That's Why I Fell in Love with You" was originally a contender for the album's third single release. It was dropped in favour of releasing "We Must Be Doin' Somethin' Right" which gained Rabbitt another top 10 hit. "That's Why I Fell in Love with You" was then released in April 1989 as the fourth and final single from the album. The song reached number 66 on the US Billboard Hot Country Singles and number 65 on the Canadian RPM Country Singles chart. At the time, "That's Why I Fell in Love with You" was Rabbitt's lowest charting single on both the US and Canadian Country charts since his commercial breakthrough as a solo artist in 1974.

Speaking of the song, Rabbitt told The Cincinnati Enquirer in 1989, "I really like the last line of that song, which goes, 'when we're close like this, there's one where there were two.' That's a great little piece of business. Just saying it gives me chill bumps."

== Critical reception ==
Upon its release as a single, Billboard wrote, "Rabbitt's vocals move gently across this well-penned ballad. Simple production and strongly quiet guitar line enhance the song's sincerity and sensitivity." In a review of I Wanna Dance with You, Jerry Sharpe of the Scripps Howard News Service described the song as "country pop" and "a man's tender tribute to the woman he loves". Larry Kart of the Chicago Tribune considered the song to be "beautiful" and "certain to re-endear Rabbitt to his female partisans".

== Cover versions ==
In 1993, "That's Why I Fell in Love With You" was covered by Dutch singer Piet Veerman for his album A Winter's Tale. In 1994, the song was also included as the B-side to Veerman's single "Recuerda".

== Track listing ==
7-inch single

1. "That's Why I Fell in Love with You" - 2:46
2. "She's an Old Cadillac" - 3:24

7-inch single (promo)

1. "That's Why I Fell in Love with You" - 2:46
2. "That's Why I Fell in Love with You" - 2:46

== Personnel ==
Production

- Richard Landis – producer
- Charlie Calello – arranger

== Charts ==
Chart (1989)	Peak position
Canada Country Tracks (RPM)	65
US Hot Country Songs (Billboard)	66
