= The Best Year of My Life =

Studio album by Eddie Rabbitt
- Released: September 17, 1984
- Recorded: 1984
- Studios: Emerald Sound Studios, Sound Stage Studios, The Garage Studio and GroundStar Studios (Nashville, Tennessee)
- Genre: Country
- Length: 31:43
- Label: Warner Bros. Nashville (original label); Liberty
- Producers: Eddie Rabbitt; Even Stevens; Jimmy Bowen

Eddie Rabbitt chronology
Greatest Hits Vol. II (1983)	The Best Year of My Life (1984)	Rabbitt Trax (1986)

Singles from The Best Year of My Life
- 1. "B-B-B-Burnin' Up with Love" Released: May 19, 1984; 2. "The Best Year of My Life" Released: September 1984

The Best Year of My Life is the ninth studio album by American country music artist Eddie Rabbitt. It was released in 1984 under the Warner Bros. Records label, but the rights to the album have since been sold to Liberty Records. The album marked the end of Rabbitt's crossover success. Four singles were released from the album including "B-B-B-Burnin' Up With Love", which peaked at No. 3 on country charts, the title track, which rose to No. 1, "Warning Sign", which charted at No. 4 and "She's Comin' Back to Say Goodbye", which peaked at No. 6. The album itself ranked No. 22 on the country albums chart.

== Track listing ==
All songs written by Eddie Rabbitt and Even Stevens except as indicated.

No.	Title	Writer(s)	Length
1.	"Warning Sign"		2:51
2.	"Could've Been Somebody Else"		3:02
3.	"Dial That Telephone"		3:19
4.	"B-B-B-Burnin' Up with Love"	Rabbitt, Stevens, Billy Joe Walker Jr.	2:30
5.	"Every Night I Fall in Love with You" (duet with Hillary Kanter)		3:35
6.	"The Best Year of My Life"		3:11
7.	"Big Brown Eyes"		3:38
8.	"She's Comin' Back to Say Goodbye"		3:06
9.	"Over There"	Rabbitt	2:42
10.	"Go to Sleep Big Bertha"		3:40

== Personnel ==
- Adapted from AllMusic:
- Eddie Rabbitt – vocals, harmony vocals, acoustic guitar
- John Barlow Jarvis – keyboards
- Randy McCormick – keyboards, synth string arrangements
- Larry Byrom – electric guitar, acoustic guitar
- Billy Joe Walker Jr. – electric guitar, acoustic guitar
- Reggie Young – electric guitar
- Spady Brannan – bass
- David Hungate – bass
- Tom Robb – bass
- Matt Betton – drums
- Paul Leim – percussion
- Even Stevens – percussion
- Paul Overstreet – additional harmony vocals
- Hillary Kanter – vocals (4)

=== Production ===
- Jimmy Bowen – producer (1–3, 5–10)
- Eddie Rabbitt – producer
- Even Stevens – producer
- David Hassinger – chief engineer
- Dave Adams – assistant engineer
- Mark Coddington – assistant engineer
- Ben Harris – assistant engineer
- Vicki Hicks – assistant engineer
- Tim Kish – assistant engineer
- Russ Martin – assistant engineer
- Ron Treat – assistant engineer
- Glenn Meadows – mastering at Masterfonics (Nashville, Tennessee)
- Simon Levy – art direction
- Michael Rey – design
- Mark Tucker – photography
- Stan Moress – management

== Chart performance ==
=== Weekly charts ===
Chart (1984)	Peak position
US Top Country Albums (Billboard)	22

=== Year-end charts ===
Chart (1985)	Position
US Top Country Albums (Billboard)	50

=== Singles ===
Year	Single	Peak chart positions		
Year	Single	US Country	US AC	CAN Country
1984	"B-B-B-Burnin' Up with Love"	3	36	2
1985	"The Best Year of My Life"	1	—	1
1985	"Warning Sign"	4	—	3
1985	"She's Comin' Back to Say Goodbye"	6	—	22
