= Rocky Mountain Music (song) =

Single by Eddie Rabbitt

from the album Rocky Mountain Music
- B-side: "Do You Right Tonight"
- Released: June 5, 1976
- Genre: Country, country rock, bluegrass
- Length: 3:35
- Label: Elektra
- Songwriter: Eddie Rabbitt
- Producer: David Malloy

Eddie Rabbitt singles chronology
"Drinkin' My Baby (Off My Mind)" (1976)	"Rocky Mountain Music" (1976)	"Two Dollars in the Jukebox" (1976)

"Rocky Mountain Music" is a song written and recorded by American country music artist Eddie Rabbitt. It was released in June 1976 as the second single and title track from the album Rocky Mountain Music. The song reached number 5 on the Billboard Hot Country Singles & Tracks chart.

German singer Jürgen Drews released a German version titled "Barfuß durch den Sommer", lit. 'barefoot through the summer', which reached number 6 on the German charts and number 22 on the Austrian charts.

== Charts ==
Rocky Mountain Music weekly peak chart positions
Chart (1976)	Peak position
US Hot Country Songs (Billboard)	5
US Billboard Hot 100	76
US Adult Contemporary (Billboard)	48
Canadian RPM Country Tracks	1

Rocky Mountain Music year-end chart positions
Chart (1976)	Position
US Hot Country Songs (Billboard)	33
