= Step by Step (Eddie Rabbitt song) =

Single by Eddie Rabbitt

from the album Step by Step
- B-side: "My Only Wish"
- Released: July 1981
- Genre: Country; soft rock
- Length: 3:41
- Label: Elektra
- Songwriters: Eddie Rabbitt; David Malloy; Even Stevens
- Producer: David Malloy

Eddie Rabbitt singles chronology
"I Love a Rainy Night" (1980)	"Step by Step" (1981)	"Someone Could Lose a Heart Tonight" (1981)

"Step by Step" is a crossover song co-written and recorded by American country music artist Eddie Rabbitt. It was released in July 1981 as the first single and title track from the album Step by Step. The song was Rabbitt's ninth number one single on the country chart. The single stayed at number one for one week and spent a total of 11 weeks on the country chart. It was written by Rabbitt, Even Stevens and David Malloy.

== Content ==
In the song, the narrator instructs a friend on how to attract the attentions of a woman to whom he's attracted, concluding the chorus with "step by step, you'll win her love".

"Step by Step" maintained Eddie Rabbitt's crossover appeal when the single made it to number five in the Top 40.

== Chart performance ==
Chart (1981)	Peak position
Canada Top Singles (RPM)	23
Canada Adult Contemporary (RPM)	2
Canada Country Singles (RPM)	1
US Hot Country Songs (Billboard)	1
US Adult Contemporary (Billboard)	3
US Billboard Hot 100	5
Australia (Kent Music Report)	83

Year-end chart (1981)	Rank
US Top Pop Singles (Billboard)	75
