= Step by Step (Eddie Rabbitt album) =

Studio album by Eddie Rabbitt
- Released: July 31, 1981
- Studios: Caribou Ranch (Nederland, Colorado); Woodland (Nashville, Tennessee); Sound Castle Recorders (Los Angeles, California); Sunset Sound (Hollywood, California)
- Genre: Country
- Length: 33:28
- Labels: Elektra (original label); Liberty
- Producer: David Malloy

Eddie Rabbitt chronology
Horizon (1980)	Step by Step (1981)	Radio Romance (1982)

Singles from Step by Step
- 1. "Step by Step" Released: July 1981; 2. "Someone Could Lose a Heart Tonight" Released: November 1981; 3. "I Don't Know Where to Start" Released: April 10, 1982

Professional ratings
Review scores
Source	Rating
Allmusic	4.5/5 stars

Step by Step is the seventh studio album by American country music artist Eddie Rabbitt. It was originally released in 1981 under the Elektra Records label but the rights to the album were later sold to Liberty Records. The album continued the crossover success established in the singer's two previous albums. Three singles were produced including the "title track", which went to number one on country charts and reached the top 5 on both the Adult Contemporary and Billboard 100 charts. "Someone Could Lose a Heart Tonight" also reached number one on country charts and made the top 15 on the other two. "I Don't Know Where to Start" peaked at two and nine on the country and adult contemporary charts, respectively.

Like Horizon, Step by Step reached number one on country album charts and ultimately achieved gold status. Allmusic retrospectively gave the album 4.5 out of 5 stars.

== Track listing ==
No.	Title	Writer(s)	Length
1.	"Early in the Mornin"	Eddie Rabbitt, David Malloy	2:19
2.	"Bring Back the Sunshine"	Rabbitt, Even Stevens	3:33
3.	"Skip a Beat"	Rabbitt, Stevens, Larry Byrom, Malloy	3:15
4.	"Dim Dim the Lights"	Malloy, Stevens, Rabbitt	2:49
5.	"Rivers"	Rabbitt, Byrom, Malloy, Stevens	2:46
6.	"Step by Step"	Rabbitt, Stevens, Malloy	3:41
7.	"Someone Could Lose a Heart Tonight"	Rabbitt, Malloy, Stevens	3:28
8.	"I Don't Know Where to Start"	Thom Schuyler	3:26
9.	"Nobody Loves Me Like My Baby"	Rabbitt	5:01
10.	"My Only Wish"	Rabbitt, Stevens, Malloy	3:07

== Chart performance ==
=== Album ===
Chart (1981)	Peak position
U.S. Billboard Top Country Albums	1
U.S. Billboard 200	23

=== Singles ===
Year	Single	Peak chart positions					
Year	Single	US Country	US	US AC	CAN Country	CAN	CAN AC
1981	"Step by Step"	1	5	3	1	23	2
1981	"Someone Could Lose a Heart Tonight"	1	15	10	4	—	—
1982	"I Don't Know Where to Start"	2	35	9	13	—	—

== Personnel ==
- Eddie Rabbitt – lead and backing vocals, acoustic guitar
- Randy McCormick – keyboards, synthesizers, string arrangements
- Larry Byrom – electric guitars, acoustic guitar
- Billy Joe Walker Jr. – electric guitars, acoustic guitar
- Don Barrett – bass
- David Hungate – bass
- James Stroud – drums, percussion
- Larry Muhoberac – string arrangements
- David Malloy – backing vocals (2)

=== Production ===
- David Malloy – producer
- Peter Granet – engineer
- Terry Christian – second engineer
- Mitch Gibson – second engineer
- David "Gino" Giorgini – second engineer
- Russ Martin – second engineer
- Greg Fulginiti – mastering at Artisan Sound Recorders (Hollywood, California)
- John Coulter – art direction
- Lynn Goldsmith – photography
- Stan Moress – management
