= I Just Want to Love You =

Single by Eddie Rabbitt

from the album Variations
- B-side: "Crossin' the Mississippi"
- Released: October 1978
- Genre: Country
- Length: 4:11
- Label: Elektra
- Songwriter(s): Eddie Rabbitt; Even Stevens; David Malloy
- Producer(s): David Malloy

Eddie Rabbitt singles chronology
"You Don't Love Me Anymore" (1978)	"I Just Want to Love You" (1978)	"Every Which Way but Loose" (1979)

For the Jay-Z song, see I Just Wanna Love U (Give It 2 Me).

"I Just Want to Love You" is a song co-written and recorded by American country music artist Eddie Rabbitt. It was released in October 1978 as the third single from the album Variations. The song was Rabbitt's third number one on the country chart. The single stayed at number one for a week and spent a total of eleven weeks on the chart. It was written by Rabbitt, Even Stevens and David Malloy.

== Chart performance ==
Chart (1978)	Peak position
US Hot Country Songs (Billboard)	1
US Adult Contemporary (Billboard)	47
Canadian RPM Country Tracks	2
