= Rocky Mountain Music =

Studio album by Eddie Rabbitt
- Released: October 1976
- Genre: Country
- Length: 30:35
- Label: Elektra
- Producer: David Malloy

Eddie Rabbitt chronology
Eddie Rabbitt (1975)	Rocky Mountain Music (1976)	Rabbitt (1977)

Singles from Rocky Mountain Music
- 1. "Drinkin' My Baby (Off My Mind)" Released: February 1976; 2. "Rocky Mountain Music" Released: June 5, 1976; 3. "Two Dollars in the Jukebox" Released: November 6, 1976

Professional ratings
Review scores
Source	Rating
Allmusic	4/5 stars

Rocky Mountain Music is the second studio album by American country music artist Eddie Rabbitt. It was released in 1976 under the Elektra Records label. The album produced three singles: "Drinkin' My Baby (Off My Mind)", which became Rabbitt's first number one hit on the Country charts; the title track, which peaked at number 5 and "Two Dollars in the Jukebox", which reached number 3. The song "I Don't Wanna Make Love (With Anyone But You)" was re-recorded for the album Loveline.

All songs, with the exception of "Could You Love A Poor Boy, Dolly" (penned by Even Stevens) were either written or co-written by Rabbitt. All co-written songs paired Rabbitt with Stevens, with the exception of "Tullahoma Dancing Pizza Man" which was a collaboration of Rabbitt and Chris Gantry.

== Track listing ==
No.	Title	Writer(s)	Length
1.	"Do You Right Tonight"	Eddie Rabbitt, Even Stevens	2:33
2.	"I Can't Get This Ring Off My Finger"	Rabbitt, Stevens	2:46
3.	"Rocky Mountain Music"	Rabbitt	3:37
4.	"Two Dollars in the Jukebox"	Rabbitt	2:26
5.	"I Don't Wanna Make Love (With Anyone But You)"	Rabbitt	2:49
6.	"I Just Got To Have You"	Rabbitt, Stevens	2:39
7.	"Tullahoma Dancing Pizza Man"	Rabbitt, Chris Gantry	2:50
8.	"Ain't I Something"	Rabbitt	2:21
9.	"There's Someone She Lies To (To Lay Here With Me)"	Rabbitt, Stevens	3:27
10.	"Could You Love A Poor Boy, Dolly"	Stevens	2:49
11.	"Drinkin' My Baby (Off My Mind)"	Rabbitt, Stevens	2:24

== Personnel ==
- Eddie Rabbitt - acoustic guitar, lead vocals, backing vocals
- David Briggs - piano
- Johnny Christopher - acoustic guitar
- Sonny Garrish - steel guitar
- Steve Gibson - electric guitar
- Lea Jane Singers - background vocals
- Shane Keister - piano, synthesizer
- Mike Leech - bass guitar
- Larrie Londin - drums
- Farrell Morris - percussion
- Joe Osborn - bass guitar
- Hargus "Pig" Robbins - piano
- Hal Rugg - steel guitar
- Buddy Spicher - fiddle, violin
- Michael Spriggs - acoustic guitar
- Bobby Thompson - acoustic guitar, banjo
- Pete Wade - acoustic guitar
- Jack Williams - bass guitar
- Reggie Young - electric guitar

== Chart positions ==
Chart (1976)	Peak position
U.S. Top Country Albums	14

=== Singles ===
Year	Song	Chart	Position
1976	"Drinkin' My Baby (Off My Mind)"	Hot Country Singles	1
1976	"Rocky Mountain Music"	Hot Country Singles	5
1977	"Two Dollars in the Jukebox"	Hot Country Singles	3
