= You Get to Me =

1974 song by Eddie Rabbitt

Single by Eddie Rabbitt

from the album Eddie Rabbitt
- B-side: "Que Pasa"
- Released: 1974
- Genre: Country
- Length: 2:45
- Label: Elektra
- Songwriter: Eddie Rabbitt
- Producer: David Malloy

Eddie Rabbitt singles chronology
"Kentucky Rain" (1968)	"You Get to Me" (1974)	"Forgive and Forget" (1975)

"You Get to Me" is a song recorded by American country music artist Eddie Rabbitt and released in 1974 as the first single from his self-titled debut album. The song was written by Rabbitt and produced by David Malloy. It was Rabbitt's first country hit, reaching number 34 on the Billboard Hot Country Singles & Tracks chart.

== Critical reception ==
On its release as a single, Cash Box described "You Get to Me" as a "fine country rocker" and "laid-back in the great tradition". They added, "The instrumentation is very mellow, the tune is well paced and Eddie's vocal power is mellow." In a review of Eddie Rabbitt, Don Weller of the Honolulu Star-Bulletin considered "You Get to Me" as one of a few tracks to have "an easy rolling flow".

== Charts ==
Chart (1974)	Peak position
Canada Country Singles (RPM)	50
US Hot Country Songs (Billboard)	34
