= Please Don't Tell Me How the Story Ends =

Single by Ronnie Milsap

from the album Pure Love
- B-side: "Streets of Gold"
- Released: July 1974
- Recorded: May 1971 (original Warner Bros. version); January 1974 (RCA version)
- Genre: Country
- Length: 2:41
- Label: RCA Victor
- Songwriter: Kris Kristofferson
- Producers: Tom Collins, Jack D. Johnson

Ronnie Milsap singles chronology
"Pure Love" (1974)	"Please Don't Tell Me How the Story Ends" (1974)	"(I'd Be) A Legend in My Time" (1974)

"Please Don't Tell Me How the Story Ends" is a song written by Kris Kristofferson and first recorded by Bobby Bare, who included it on his Where Have All the Seasons Gone album in January 1971.

Kristofferson recorded the song with Rita Coolidge for their final duet album, Natural Act, and later with Mark Knopfler for The Austin Sessions.

== Ronnie Milsap version ==
In 1974, the song was recorded by American country music artist Ronnie Milsap. It was released in July, as the second single from the album Pure Love. The song was his fourth country hit and second number one on the country chart. With this song Milsap won his first Grammy award for Best Country Vocal Performance. The single stayed at number one for two weeks and spent a total of nine weeks on the country chart. Milsap himself recorded an earlier version of the song, released on his 1971 self-titled album while recording for Warner Bros. Records.

=== Charts ===
Chart (1974)	Peak position
US Billboard Hot 100	95
US Hot Country Songs (Billboard)	1
Canadian RPM Country Tracks	1
