= Drinkin' My Baby (Off My Mind) =

Single by Eddie Rabbitt

from the album Rocky Mountain Music
- B-side: "When I Was Young"
- Released: February 1976
- Recorded: January 1976
- Genre: Country
- Length: 2:24
- Label: Elektra
- Songwriters: Eddie Rabbitt; Even Stevens
- Producer: David Malloy

Eddie Rabbitt singles chronology
"I Should Have Married You" (1975)	"Drinkin' My Baby (Off My Mind)" (1976)	"Rocky Mountain Music" (1976)

"Drinkin' My Baby (Off My Mind)" is a song by American country music artist Eddie Rabbitt. It was released in February 1976 as the first single from the album Rocky Mountain Music. The song was Rabbitt's fourth country hit and the first of fifteen solo number-one country hits. The single stayed at number one for one week and spent a total of twelve weeks on the country chart. The song was written by Rabbitt, along with Even Stevens.

== Charts ==
Chart (1976)	Peak position
U.S. Billboard Hot Country Singles	1
US Hot Country Songs (Billboard)	1
