= Songs from Rabbittland =

Studio album by Eddie Rabbitt
- Released: Late 1997
- Genre: Country, children's music
- Label: Cema Special Markets
- Producer: Eddie Rabbitt

Eddie Rabbitt chronology
Beatin' the Odds (1997)	Songs from Rabbittland (1997)

Professional ratings
Review scores
Source	Rating
Allmusic	2.5/5 stars

Songs from Rabbittland is the fifteenth and final studio album by country artist Eddie Rabbitt. The album was released in late 1997 and contained 17 children's songs, jokes, and stories told by Rabbitt that he wrote for his kids. There were no singles released from this album. This was Rabbitt's last studio album before his death at the age of 56 on May 7, 1998.

Rabbitt stated that the album was made up of "17 songs, jokes, and stories I wrote for my kids as they were growing up."

== Track listing ==
All tracks were composed by Eddie Rabbitt.

1. "Hi Kids" - :09
2. "Come with Me (Rabbittland)" - 3:02
3. "Why, Why, Why" - 2:27
4. "Who's That Pullin' on Me?" - 2:07
5. "Mr. Eddie & Miss Angela, No. 1" - :32
6. "Heat 'Em up, Eat 'Em Up" - :46
7. "You Can Do Anything" - 3:06
8. "Andrew the Squirrel" - 2:25
9. "Mr. Eddie & Miss Angela, No. 2" - :12
10. "Woodchuck" - :27
11. "Puppy" - 2:04
12. "26 Sheep Story" - :57
13. "All the Little Animals" - 2:33
14. "Friend" - 3:18
15. "Mr. Eddie & Miss Angela, No. 3" - :27
16. "Can You Tell Me a Story" - 2:21
17. "Sleepy Deepy Do" - :51

== Personnel ==
- Don Barrett - bass guitar
- Lee Garner - acoustic guitar, electric guitar
- Eddie Rabbitt - acoustic guitar, lead vocals, background vocals
- Gene Sisk - sound effects, keyboards
