= Ronnie Milsap (album) =

Studio album by Ronnie Milsap
- Released: August 1971
- Studios: American Sound Studio, Memphis; Muscle Shoals Sound Studios; Quadrafonic Sound Studios, Nashville; Ardent Studios, Memphis; Record Plant, Los Angeles; Wally Heider Studios, San Francisco
- Genre: Country
- Length: 33:51
- Label: Warner Bros.
- Producer: Dan Penn

Ronnie Milsap chronology
Ronnie Milsap (1971)	Where My Heart Is (1973)

Professional ratings
Review scores
Source	Rating
Allmusic	4/5 stars

Ronnie Milsap is the debut studio album by American country music artist Ronnie Milsap. It was released in 1971 on Warner Bros. Records.

Among the tracks on the album is "Please Don't Tell Me How the Story Ends", which he re-recorded in 1974 after he signed a contract with RCA Nashville and established himself as a hitmaker in country music. The remake went on to be a No. 1 hit on the Billboard Hot Country Singles chart.

== Track listing ==
1. "Dedicate the Blues to Me" (Huey P. Meaux) – 3:20
2. "Sunday Rain" (Mark James) – 3:09
3. "Please Don't Tell Me How the Story Ends" (Kris Kristofferson) – 3:00
4. "Sweet Little Rock & Roller" (Chuck Berry) – 3:17
5. "Blue Skies of Montana" (Spooner Oldham, Dan Penn) – 5:29
6. "Sanctified" (Jim Dickinson, Bob McDill) – 3:33
7. "Keep on Smiling (1980)" (Karen Oldham, Spooner Oldham) – 3:21
8. "The Cat Was a Junkie" (Bobby Weinstein, Jon Stroll)
9. "Crying" (Joe Melson, Roy Orbison) – 2:30
10. "Not for the Love of a Woman" (Nat Foster) – 3:08
11. "Why" (Swain Schaefer) – 3:04

== Personnel ==
- Ronnie Milsap – vocals, keyboards
- Eddie Hinton, Gimmer Nicholson, James Burton, Johnny Christopher, Reggie Young, Tippy Armstrong, Wayne Perkins – guitar
- Chris Ethridge, Mike Leech, Norbert Putnam – bass
- Bobby Emmons, Bobby Wood, David Briggs, Glen Spreen, Jim Dickinson, Swain Schaefer – Hammond B-3 organ
- Gene Chrisman, Kenny Buttrey, Roger Hawkins – drums
- Hayward Bishop – percussion
- Andrew Love, Wayne Jackson, Ed Logan – horns
- The Black Berries – backing vocals
- Glen Spreen – string arrangements

Technical

- Dan Penn, Gene Eichelberger, Jim Johnson, Marlin Greene, Ralph Rhodes, Terry Manning – engineers
- Ed Thrasher – art director
- Jim Marshall – photography
