= Drivin' My Life Away =

1980 single by Eddie Rabbitt

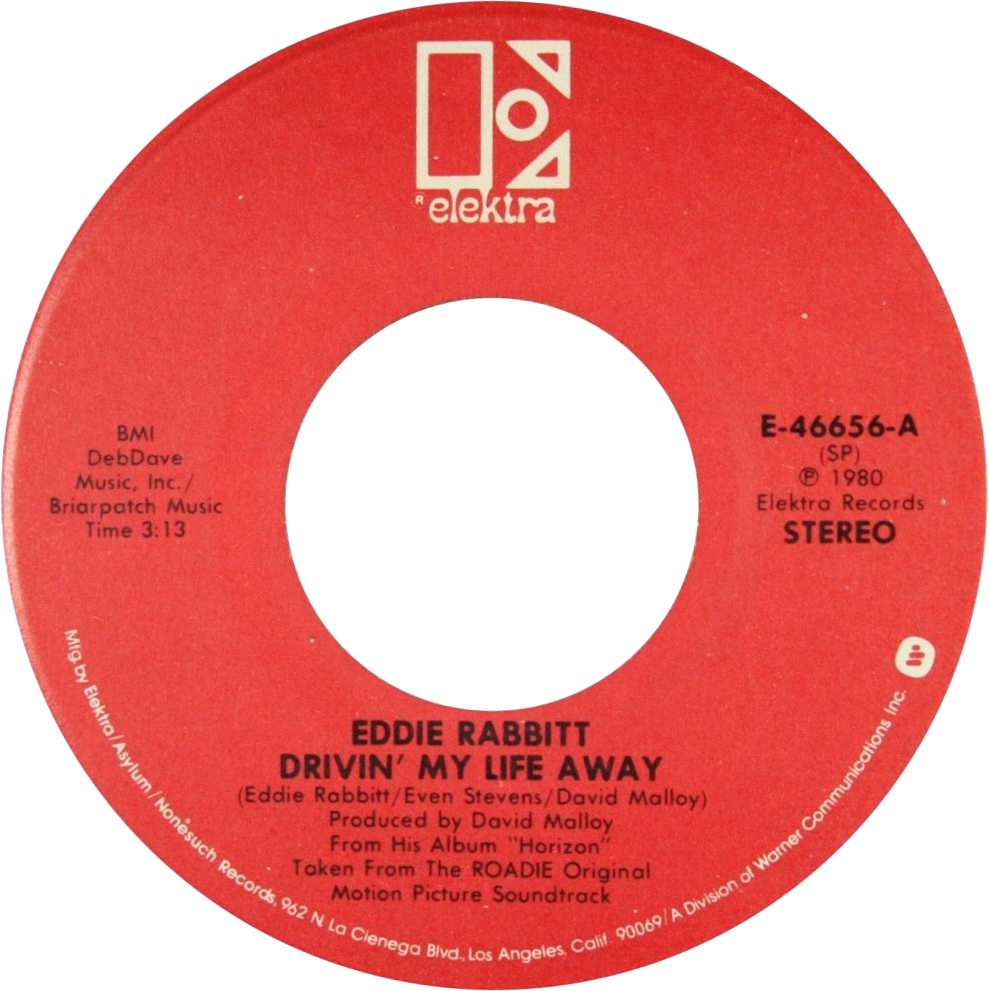
- A-side label of US single

Single by Eddie Rabbitt

from the album Horizon
- B-side: "Pretty Lady"
- Released: June 9, 1980
- Recorded: 1980
- Length: 3:17
- Label: Elektra
- Songwriters: David Malloy; Eddie Rabbitt; Even Stevens
- Producer: David Malloy

Eddie Rabbitt singles chronology
"Gone Too Far" (1980)	"Drivin' My Life Away" (1980)	"I Love a Rainy Night" (1980)

Alternative release
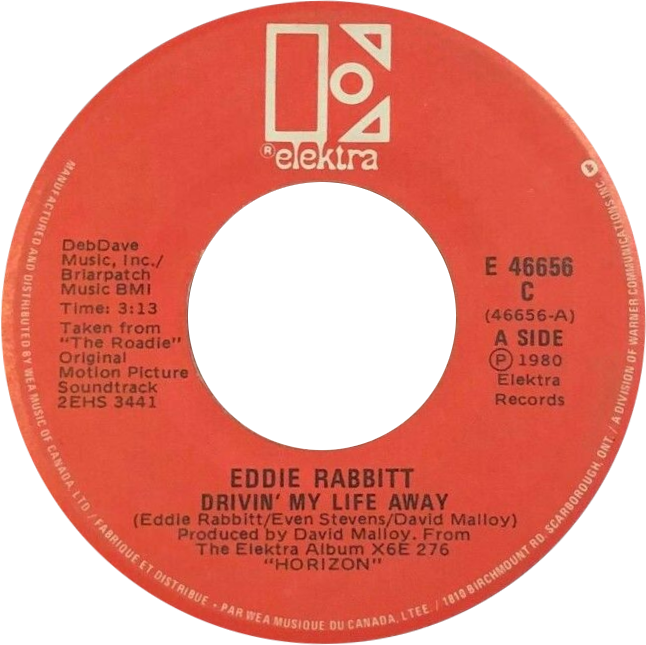
- Side A of Canadian single

"Drivin' My Life Away" is a song co-written and recorded by American country music artist Eddie Rabbitt. It was released in June 1980 as the first single from the album Horizon. The song was written by Rabbitt, Even Stevens, and David Malloy.

== Content ==
The song is a look into the life of truck drivers and the long periods of time they spend away from home.

== Commercial performance ==
Although many of Rabbitt's successful songs were country-pop material, "Drivin' My Life Away" began its peak popularity as a crossover song. The song peaked at number five on the Billboard Hot 100 and set the stage for his biggest career hit: "I Love a Rainy Night", which reached the top on the country, Hot 100, and adult contemporary charts in early 1981. Two more crossover hits – "Step by Step" and "You and I" (the latter a duet with Crystal Gayle) – followed in 1981 and 1982.

On Billboard's Hot Country Singles chart, it was his seventh out of 17 career chart toppers, spanning from 1976 through 1990.

In 1981, "Drivin' My Life Away" was certified gold for sales of half a million units by the Recording Industry Association of America. It has also sold a further 267,000 digital copies in the US since it became available for download.

== Uses in media ==
- It was featured on the soundtrack of the 1980 movie Roadie starring Meat Loaf and Art Carney.
- The song was covered in Kidsongs' 1987 video "What I Want to Be".
- The song was covered in the 1987 episode "Cup A' Joe" from season three of The A-Team.
- It was also featured on the soundtrack of the movie Black Dog starring Patrick Swayze, Randy Travis, and Meat Loaf.
- The song was featured in the 2016 film Everybody Wants Some!! at a scene that takes place at a Texas country bar.
- In Eddie Rabbitt's 1990 country hit "Running with the Wind", he mentions the 1980 crossover hit "Drivin' My Life Away" with the following lyric: I listen to the windshield wipers go/Just like the song I used to know/I'm drivin' my life away, hey/Drivin' my life away.
- The song is featured in the 2018 program The Americans, season six, episode four, during a line-dancing scene.
- The song is featured at the beginning and the end of the 2018 film Finding Steve McQueen.
- The song is featured as part of the soundtrack for the video game NASCAR 25.

== Charts ==
"Drivin' My Life Away" was released in 1980 as the first single from his album Horizon. It reached number one on the Hot Country Singles in 1980, and peaked at number five on the Billboard Hot 100.

Chart (1980)	Peak position
Australia (Kent Music Report)	100
Canadian RPM Country Tracks	2
Canada Top Singles (RPM)	45
Canada Adult Contemporary (RPM)	2
Dutch Top 40	27
Netherlands (Single Top 100)	32
New Zealand (Recorded Music NZ)	22
US Billboard Hot 100	5
US Hot Country Songs (Billboard)	1
US Billboard Adult Contemporary	3

Year-end chart (1980)	Rank
US Top Pop Singles (Billboard)	85
US Hot Country Songs (Billboard)	18

== Certifications ==
Certifications for "Change Me"
Region	Certification	Certified units/sales
New Zealand (RMNZ)	Gold	15,000^{‡}
^{‡} Sales+streaming figures based on certification alone.

== Rhett Akins cover ==
"Drivin' My Life Away"

Single by Rhett Akins

from the album Black Dog soundtrack
- B-side: "A Man with 18 Wheels"
- Released: April 1998
- Genre: Country
- Length: 3:06
- Label: Decca
- Songwriters: David Malloy; Eddie Rabbitt; Even Stevens
- Producers: Frank Liddell, Greg Droman

Rhett Akins singles chronology
"Better Than It Used to Be" (1998)	"Drivin' My Life Away" (1998)	"Highway Sunrise" (2002)

In 1998, country music artist Rhett Akins recorded a cover version of this song for the soundtrack to the 1998 film Black Dog. This cover, released with Lee Ann Womack's "A Man with 18 Wheels" on the B-side, peaked at number 56 on the country music charts.

Akins told Billboard that he was "apprehensive" about recording the song because of the familiarity of Rabbitt's original version. He also said that he wanted to record the song "the way I want to do it", but also that he wanted it to fit with the tone of the movie. As he did not know what the movie was going to be about, he consulted its director, Kevin Hooks, who flew to Nashville and told him the movie's plot and tone. Akins felt that the movie "was going to be high energy", so he made his rendition "a pretty rockin' track, real edgy".

Deborah Evans Price of Billboard panned Akins' cover, saying, "Akins delivery doesn't have the zip and punch of Rabbitt's energetic version, and the production sounds like a watered-down version of the original."

=== Charts ===
Chart (1998)	Peak position
Canada Country Singles (RPM)	61
US Hot Country Songs (Billboard)	56
