= We Must Be Doin' Somethin' Right =

Single by Eddie Rabbitt

from the album I Wanna Dance with You
- B-side: "He's a Cheater"
- Released: October 8, 1988
- Genre: Country
- Length: 3:35
- Label: RCA Victor
- Songwriters: Eddie Rabbitt; Reed Nielsen
- Producer: Richard Landis

Eddie Rabbitt singles chronology
"The Wanderer" (1988)	"We Must Be Doin' Somethin' Right" (1988)	"That's Why I Fell in Love with You" (1989)

"We Must Be Doin' Somethin' Right" is a song co-written and recorded by American country music artist Eddie Rabbitt. It was released in October 1988 as the third single from the album I Wanna Dance with You. The song reached number 7 on the Billboard Hot Country Singles & Tracks chart. It was written by Rabbitt and Reed Nielsen.

== Chart performance ==
Chart (1988–1989)	Peak position
US Hot Country Songs (Billboard)	7
Canadian RPM Country Tracks	2
