= I Love a Rainy Night =

Single by Eddie Rabbitt

from the album Horizon
- B-side: "Short Road to Love"
- Released: November 10, 1980
- Recorded: 1980
- Genre: Country; rockabilly
- Length: 3:08
- Label: Elektra
- Songwriters: David Malloy; Eddie Rabbitt; Even Stevens
- Producer: David Malloy

Eddie Rabbitt singles chronology
"Drivin' My Life Away" (1980)	"I Love a Rainy Night" (1980)	"Step by Step" (1981)

Professional ratings
Review scores
Source	Rating
Billboard	(unrated)

"I Love a Rainy Night" is a song co-written and recorded by American country music artist Eddie Rabbitt. It was released in November 1980 as the second single from his album Horizon. It reached number one on the Hot Country Singles, Billboard Hot 100, and Adult Contemporary Singles charts in early 1981. It was written by Rabbitt, Even Stevens, and David Malloy.

== Song history ==
According to music historian Fred Bronson, "I Love a Rainy Night" was 12 years in the making. Rabbitt had a collection of old tapes he kept in the basement of his home. While rummaging through the tapes one day in 1980, he heard a fragment of a song he had recorded one rainy night in the late 1960s.

"It brought back the memory of sitting in a small apartment, staring out the window at one o'clock in the morning, watching the rain come down," wrote Bronson in The Billboard Book of Number One Hits. "He sang into his tape recorder, 'I love a rainy night, I love a rainy night.'"

Upon rediscovery of the old lyrics, Rabbitt completed the song (with help from frequent songwriting partners Even Stevens and David Malloy) and recorded it.

The result included vivid descriptions of a man's fondness for thunderstorms and the peace it brings him ("I love to hear the thunder/watch the lightnin' when it lights up the sky/you know it makes me feel good") and a renewed sense of hope of pleasant weather in the morning that the storms bring ("Showers wash all my cares away/I wake up to a sunny day").

The song's other distinctive feature is its rhythmic pattern of alternating finger snaps and hand claps, which was included with the help of percussionist Farrell Morris, who, according to The Billboard Book of Number One Country Hits, mixed two tracks of each to complete the record.

== Chart performance ==
On February 28, the song succeeded Dolly Parton's hit film theme song "9 to 5" in the number-one position on the Billboard Hot 100 pop singles chart. On March 14, Parton's song returned to the top spot – the last time that the pop chart featured back-to-back "country" singles in the top position until August 2023, when Jason Aldean's "Try That in a Small Town" succeeded "Last Night" by Morgan Wallen.

"I Love a Rainy Night" came during Rabbitt's peak popularity as a crossover artist. The follow-up to "Drivin' My Life Away" (number one country, number five Hot 100), the song was Rabbitt's only Hot 100 number one. But his crossover success continued with the follow-ups "Step by Step" and "You and I" (the latter a duet with Crystal Gayle).

On Billboard's Hot Country Singles chart, it was his eighth out of 17 career chart-toppers, spanning from 1976 to 1990.

"I Love a Rainy Night" was certified gold for sales of one million units by the Recording Industry Association of America.

== Charts ==
=== Weekly charts ===
Chart (1980–1981)	Peak position
Australia (Kent Music Report)	6
Canadian RPM Country Tracks	4
Canada Top Singles (RPM)	11
New Zealand Singles Chart	8
UK Singles Chart	53
US Hot Country Songs (Billboard)	1
US Billboard Hot 100	1
US Adult Contemporary (Billboard)	1

=== Year-end charts ===
Year-end chart (1981)	Rank
Australia (Kent Music Report)	54
Canada Top Singles (RPM)	74
US Top Pop Singles (Billboard)	8

=== All-time charts ===
Chart (1958–2018)	Position
US Billboard Hot 100	474

== See also ==
- List of Billboard Hot 100 number-one singles of 1981
