= American Boy (Eddie Rabbitt song) =

1990 single by Eddie Rabbitt

Single by Eddie Rabbitt

from the album Jersey Boy
- Released: August 1990
- Genre: Country
- Length: 3:12
- Label: Capitol
- Songwriter: Eddie Rabbitt
- Producer: Richard Landis

Eddie Rabbitt singles chronology
"It's Lonely Out Tonite" (1990)	"American Boy" (1990)	"Tennessee Born and Bred" (1991)

"American Boy" is a song written and recorded by American country music artist Eddie Rabbitt. It was released in August 1990 as the fourth single from his album Jersey Boy. The song reached number 11 on country charts and was his final song to reach the top 40 on the chart.

The song was popular among United States servicemen and their families during the 1991 Gulf War and was used by Senator Bob Dole during his 1996 campaign for President of the United States. A re-recorded version of the song was later released on Rabbitt's 1997 album Beatin' the Odds

== Campaign song ==
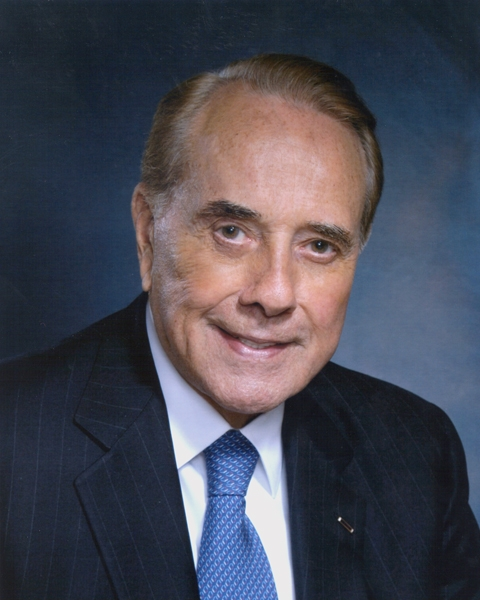
Senator Bob Dole

In October 1996, Bob Dole asked Rabbitt to use the song at political rallies for his campaign for presidency, according to Rabbitt he stated "I'm really a big fan and I really enjoy your music and I really like your song." Rabbitt answered Dole's request by stating "With my pleasure, you can use my song." "American Boy" replaced "Dole Man" (a rework of the 1967 song "Soul Man") and "Born in the U.S.A." as the campaign song of Bob Dole's run against incumbent president Bill Clinton.

== Chart positions ==
Chart (1990)	Peak position
US Hot Country Songs (Billboard)	11
