= Two Dollars in the Jukebox =

Single by Eddie Rabbitt

from the album Rocky Mountain Music
- B-side: "Don't Wanna Make Love (With Anyone but You)"
- Released: November 6, 1976
- Genre: Country
- Length: 2:23
- Label: Elektra
- Songwriter(s): Eddie Rabbitt
- Producer(s): David Malloy

Eddie Rabbitt singles chronology
"Rocky Mountain Music" (1976)	"Two Dollars in the Jukebox" (1976)	"I Can't Help Myself" (1977)

"Two Dollars in the Jukebox" is a song written and recorded by American country music artist Eddie Rabbitt. It was released in November 1976 as the third single from the album Rocky Mountain Music. The song reached number 3 on the Billboard Hot Country Singles & Tracks chart.

== Charts ==
=== Weekly charts ===
Chart (1976–1977)	Peak position
US Hot Country Songs (Billboard)	3
Canadian RPM Country Tracks	2

=== Year-end charts ===
Chart (1977)	Position
US Hot Country Songs (Billboard)	38
