= On Second Thought =

Single by Eddie Rabbitt

from the album Jersey Boy
- B-side: "Only One Love In My Life"
- Released: November 1989
- Genre: Country
- Length: 3:37
- Label: Capitol Records
- Songwriter: Eddie Rabbitt
- Producer: Richard Landis

Eddie Rabbitt singles chronology
"That's Why I Fell in Love with You" (1989)	"On Second Thought" (1989)	"Runnin' with the Wind" (1990)

"On Second Thought" is a song written and recorded by American country music artist Eddie Rabbitt. It was released in November 1989 as the first single from the album Jersey Boy. The song topped both the United States and Canadian country charts for two weeks in 1990. It was the final No. 1 song for Rabbitt, who died from lung cancer in 1998.

The song marked a return to traditional country for Rabbitt since his emergence as a crossover success in the late 1970s and early 1980s. It had been described as a "country shuffle." A re-recorded version of the song was also included on his 1997 album Beatin' the Odds.

== Music video ==
A music video was filmed for the song, and was directed by Steve Boyle. It was filmed in black-and-white, and features Rabbitt performing on the fictitious TV show "Goodnight Ranch Party".

== Chart positions ==
Chart (1989–1990)	Peak position
Canada Country Singles (RPM)	1
US Hot Country Songs (Billboard)	1

=== Year-end charts ===
Chart (1990)	Position
Canada Country Tracks (RPM)	21
US Country Songs (Billboard)	3
