= Horizon (Eddie Rabbitt album) =

Studio album by Eddie Rabbitt
- Released: June 20, 1980
- Studios: Caribou Ranch (Nederland, Colorado); Woodland (Nashville, Tennessee); Sunset Sound Recorders (Hollywood, California); The Village Recorder (Los Angeles, California)
- Genre: Country
- Length: 30:47
- Label: Elektra
- Producer: David Malloy

Eddie Rabbitt chronology
Loveline (1979)	Horizon (1980)	Step by Step (1981)

Singles from Horizon
- 1. "Drivin' My Life Away" Released: June 9, 1980; 2. "I Love a Rainy Night" Released: November 10, 1980

Horizon is the sixth studio album by American country music artist Eddie Rabbitt. It was released in 1980 under the Elektra Records label. The album produced two singles, both of which reached number one on country charts. The lead-off single "Drivin' My Life Away" reached number 5 on the Billboard Hot 100 and number 9 on the Adult Contemporary chart. The other single, "I Love a Rainy Night" reached number one on all three charts, the only single in Rabbitt's career ever to do so. In 2009, the album was released in CD format.

== Reception ==
Professional ratings
Review scores
Source	Rating
AllMusic	4.5/5 stars

Horizon reached number one on country album charts and ultimately reached platinum status. AllMusic retrospectively gave the album 4.5 stars out of 5 and praised the tracks on side one for their "sun-inspired, guitar-based productions, heavy on the echo" but described the second side as being "a bit ballad-heavy." The review described the album as a "rockabilly release".

== Track listing ==
All tracks written by Eddie Rabbitt, David Malloy and Even Stevens, except where noted.

No.	Title	Writer(s)	Length
1.	"I Love a Rainy Night"		3:11
2.	"747"	Rabbitt	3:07
3.	"Drivin' My Life Away"		3:17
4.	"Short Road to Love"	Rabbitt, Stevens	2:37
5.	"Rockin' with My Baby"		2:31
6.	"I Need to Fall in Love Again"	Paul Overstreet, Stevens	2:31
7.	"So Deep in Your Love"		3:25
8.	"What Will I Write"		3:01
9.	"Pretty Lady"		3:28
10.	"Just the Way It Is"	Rabbitt, Stevens	3:45

== Chart performance ==
=== Album ===
Chart (1980)	Peak position
U.S. Billboard Top Country Albums	1
U.S. Billboard 200	19
Australia (Kent Music Report)	96
Canadian RPM Country Albums	5

=== Singles ===
Year	Single	Peak chart positions					
Year	Single	US Country	US	US AC	CAN Country	CAN	CAN AC
1980	"Drivin' My Life Away"	1	5	3	2	45	2
1980	"I Love a Rainy Night"	1	1	1	4	11	—

== Personnel ==
As listed in liner notes

- Eddie Rabbitt – lead vocals, harmony vocals, acoustic guitars
- Alan Feingold – acoustic piano
- Randy McCormick – keyboards, synthesizers, string arrangements
- Larry Byrom – electric guitars
- Don Barrett – bass
- David Hungate – bass
- Norbert Putnam – bass
- James Stroud – drums, percussion
- Farrell Morris – percussion
- Larry Muhoberac – string arrangements
- Sherry Grooms – additional backing vocals
- David Malloy – additional backing vocals
- Paul Overstreet – additional backing vocals

=== Production ===
- David Malloy – producer
- Peter Granet – engineer
- Greg Edward – assistant engineer
- Carla Frederick – assistant engineer
- David "Gino" Giorgini – assistant engineer
- Steve Goostree – assistant engineer
- David Leonard – assistant engineer
- Mike Reese – mastering at The Mastering Lab (Hollywood, California)
- Beverly Parker – photography
- Stan Moress – management
