= You Don't Love Me Anymore (Eddie Rabbitt song) =

Single by Eddie Rabbitt

from the album Variations
- B-side: "Caroline"
- Released: May 1978
- Genre: Country, soft rock
- Length: 3:22
- Label: Elektra
- Songwriters: Alan Ray; Jeff Raymond
- Producer: David Malloy

Eddie Rabbitt singles chronology
"Hearts on Fire" (1978)	"You Don't Love Me Anymore" (1978)	"I Just Want to Love You" (1978)

"You Don't Love Me Anymore" is a song written by Alan Ray and Jeff Raymond, and recorded by American country music artist Eddie Rabbitt. It was released in May 1978 as the second single from the album Variations. The song was Rabbitt's second number one on the country chart. The single stayed at number one for one week and spent a total of ten weeks on the country chart.

== Chart performance ==
Chart (1978)	Peak position
US Hot Country Songs (Billboard)	1
US Billboard Hot 100	53
US Adult Contemporary (Billboard)	18
US Cash Box Top 100	64
Canadian RPM Country Tracks	3
Canadian RPM Top Singles	70
