= Pure Love (Ronnie Milsap song) =

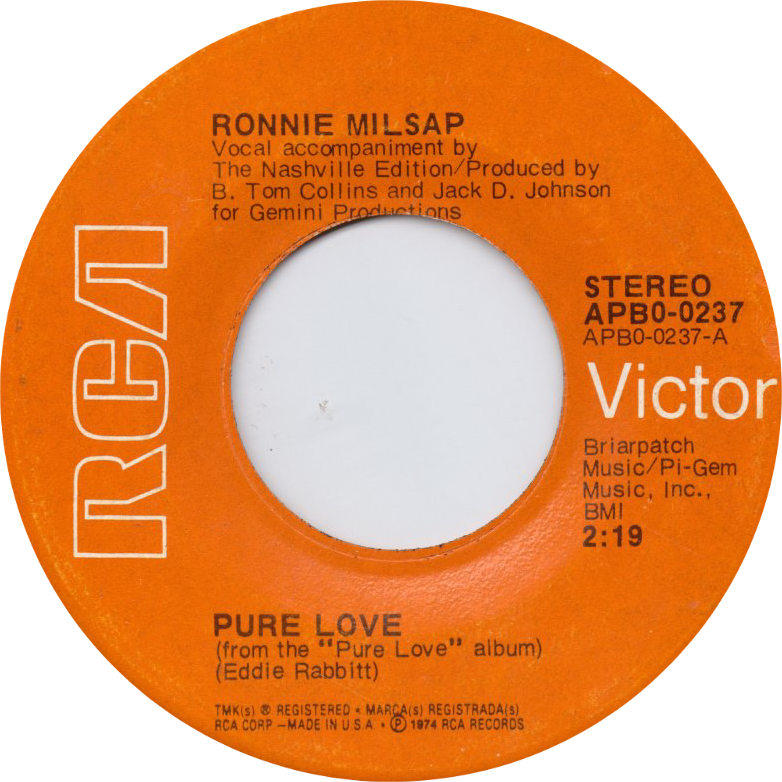

Single by Ronnie Milsap

from the album Pure Love
- B-side: "Love the Second Time Around"
- Released: March 30, 1974
- Recorded: January 1974
- Genre: Country
- Length: 2:21
- Label: RCA Victor
- Songwriter: Eddie Rabbitt
- Producers: Tom Collins, Jack D. Johnson

Ronnie Milsap singles chronology
"That Girl Who Waits on Tables" (1973)	"Pure Love" (1974)	"Please Don't Tell Me How the Story Ends" (1974)

"Pure Love" is the song which also marked the first country chart-topping single by its writer, Eddie Rabbitt, a country music singer.

== Background ==
Eddie Rabbitt had tasted previous success with 70's "Kentucky Rain", sung by Elvis Presley. In "Pure Love", Rabbitt compares "pure love" to such things as milk, honey and the Cap'n Crunch breakfast cereal, before pointing out that the love shared between the protagonist and his/her object of affection is "99 44/100 percent pure" (borrowing from the old Ivory soap advertising slogan). Eddie Rabbitt would later record the song as the B-side to his 1975 single "Forgive and Forget".

== Chart performance ==
Chart (1974)	Peak position
Australia (Kent Music Report)	71
US Hot Country Songs (Billboard)	1
Canadian RPM Country Tracks	2
