= Jersey Boy =

Studio album by Eddie Rabbitt
- Released: April 9, 1990
- Recorded: 1989
- Studios: Nightingale Studios, Quad Studios and Woodland Sound Studios (Nashville, Tennessee)
- Genre: Country
- Length: 36:27
- Label: Capitol Records
- Producer: Richard Landis

Eddie Rabbitt chronology
I Wanna Dance with You (1988)	Jersey Boy (1990)	Ten Rounds (1991)

Singles from Jersey Boy
- 1. "On Second Thought" Released: November 1989; 2. "Runnin' with the Wind" Released: April 7, 1990; 3. "American Boy" Released: August 1990; 4. "It's Lonely Out Tonite" Released: August 4, 1990; 5. "Tennessee Born and Bred" Released: 1991

Professional ratings
Review scores
Source	Rating
Allmusic	4/5 stars

Jersey Boy is the twelfth studio album by American country music artist Eddie Rabbitt. It was released in 1990 by Capitol Records. The album produced five singles including "On Second Thought", the final number one country hit of Rabbitt's career, and "American Boy", which became a popular song among American soldiers and citizens during the Gulf War.

Jersey Boy reached number 34 on country album charts. Allmusic gave the album four out of five stars citing the tracks "Only One Love in My Life", "Feel Like a Stranger" and "Tennessee Born and Bred" as songs "that Eddie Rabbitt fans might especially enjoy."

== Track listing ==
No.	Title	Writer(s)	Length
1.	"Tennessee Born and Bred"	Eddie Rabbitt, Reed Nielsen	3:42
2.	"On Second Thought"	Rabbitt	3:38
3.	"Runnin' with the Wind"	Rabbitt, Nielsen	4:05
4.	"They're Tearin' My Little Town Down"	Nielsen	2:39
5.	"American Boy"	Rabbitt	3:13
6.	"Hold on to Me (The Rain Song)"	Rabbitt, Nielsen	4:19
7.	"Feel Like a Stranger"	Rabbitt, Nielsen	3:23
8.	"It's Lonely Out Tonite"	Rabbitt, Nielsen	3:33
9.	"Jersey Boy"	Rabbitt	4:41
10.	"Only One Love in My Life"	Rabbitt, Nielsen	3:10

== Personnel ==
- Eddie Rabbitt – lead vocals, backing vocals, acoustic guitar
- Reed Nielsen – keyboards, acoustic guitar, additional backing vocals
- Matt Rollings – keyboards
- Joey Miskulin – accordion
- Larry Byrom – electric guitar
- Steve Gibson – electric guitar
- Vince Gill – electric guitar, mandolin, additional backing vocals
- Billy Joe Walker Jr. – acoustic guitar
- Béla Fleck – banjo
- Paul Franklin – dobro, pedal steel guitar
- David Hungate – bass
- Paul Leim – drums
- Richard Landis – percussion, additional backing vocals
- Mark O'Connor – fiddle
- Billy Thomas – additional backing vocals

=== Production ===
- Richard Landis – producer
- Joe Bogan – track recording
- Brad Jones – tracking assistant
- Lynn Peterzell – overdub recording
- Tom Oates – overdub assistant
- Jim Dineen – mixing at The Grey Room (Hollywood, California)
- David Scott – mix assistant
- Glenn Meadows – mastering at Masterfonics (Nashville, Tennessee)
- Wally Traugott – mastering at Capitol Studios (Hollywood, California)
- Anita Surace – project coordinator
- Virginia Team – art direction
- Jerry Joyner – design
- Beverly Parker – photography
- Moress Nanas Golden Entertainment – management

== Chart performance ==
=== Album ===
Chart (1990)	Peak position
U.S. Billboard Top Country Albums	34

=== Singles ===
Year	Single	Peak positions	
Year	Single	US Country	CAN Country
1989	"On Second Thought"	1	1
1990	"Runnin' with the Wind"	8	6
1990	"It's Lonely Out Tonite"	32	32
1990	"American Boy"	11	—
1991	"Tennessee Born and Bred"	58	82
