= Eddie Rabbitt =

American country singer (1941–1998)

- Rabbitt in 1990

Background information
- Born: Edward Thomas Rabbitt; November 27, 1941; New York City, U.S.
- Died: May 7, 1998 (aged 56) Nashville, Tennessee, U.S.
- Genre: Country
- Occupations: Singer; songwriter
- Instruments: Vocals; guitar
- Years active: 1964–1997
- Labels: Elektra; RCA; Warner Bros.; Capitol; Liberty
- Spouse: Janine Girardi (m. 1976)

Edward Thomas Rabbitt (November 27, 1941 – May 7, 1998) was an American country music singer and songwriter.

His career began as a songwriter in the late 1960s, composing hits such as "Kentucky Rain" for Elvis Presley in 1970 and "Pure Love" for Ronnie Milsap in 1974. Later in the 1970s, Rabbitt emerged as a performer and helped develop the county-pop crossover style which became prevalent in the 1980s. His hits included "Suspicions", "I Love a Rainy Night" (a number-one hit single on the Billboard Hot 100), "Drivin' My Life Away" and "Every Which Way but Loose" (the theme from the film of the same title). His duets "Both to Each Other (Friends and Lovers)" with Juice Newton and "You and I" with Crystal Gayle later appeared on the soap operas Days of Our Lives and All My Children.

== Early life ==
Rabbitt was born to Irish immigrants Thomas Michael and Mae (née Joyce) Rabbitt in Brooklyn, New York City, in 1941, and was raised in the nearby community of East Orange, New Jersey. His father was an oil-refinery refrigeration worker, and a skilled fiddle and accordion player, who often entertained in local New York City dance halls. By age 12, Rabbitt was a proficient guitar player, having been taught by his scoutmaster, Bob Scwickrath. During his childhood, Rabbitt became a self-proclaimed "walking encyclopedia of country music". After his parents divorced, he dropped out of East Orange High School at age 16. His mother, Mae, explained that Eddie "was never one for school [because] his head was too full of music." He later obtained a high school diploma at night school.

== Career ==
=== Early career ===
Rabbitt worked as a mental hospital attendant in the late 1950s, but like his father, he fulfilled his love of music by performing at the Six Steps Down club in his hometown. He later won a talent contest and was given an hour of Saturday-night radio show time to broadcast a live performance from a bar in Paterson, New Jersey. In 1964, he signed his first record deal with 20th Century Records and released the singles "Next to the Note" and "Six Nights and Seven Days". Four years later, with $1,000 to his name, Rabbitt moved to Nashville, where he began his career as a songwriter. During his first night in the town, Rabbitt wrote "Working My Way Up to the Bottom", which Roy Drusky recorded in 1968. To support himself, Rabbitt worked as a truck driver, soda jerk, and fruit picker in Nashville. He was ultimately hired as a staff writer for the Hill & Range Publishing Company for $37.50 per week. As a young songwriter, Rabbitt socialized with other aspiring writers at Wally's Clubhouse, a Nashville bar; he said the other patrons and he had "no place else to go."

Rabbitt became successful as a songwriter in 1969, when Elvis Presley recorded his song "Kentucky Rain". The song went gold and cast Rabbitt as one of Nashville's leading young songwriters. Presley also recorded Rabbitt's song "Patch It Up", which was featured in the concert film Elvis: That's the Way It Is, and a lesser-known Rabbitt song called "Inherit the Wind" on the album Back in Memphis. While eating Cap'n Crunch, he penned "Pure Love", which Ronnie Milsap rode to number one in 1974. This song led to a contract offer from Elektra Records.

Rabbitt signed with Elektra Records in 1975. His first single under that label, "You Get to Me", made the top 40 that year, and two songs in 1975, "Forgive and Forget" and "I Should Have Married You", nearly made the top 10. These three songs, along with a recording of "Pure Love", were included on Rabbitt's 1975 self-named debut album. In 1976, he released his critically acclaimed album Rocky Mountain Music, which included Rabbitt's first number-one country hit, "Drinkin' My Baby (Off My Mind)". In 1977, his third album, Rabbitt, was released, and made the top five on the Country Albums chart. Also in 1977, the Academy of Country Music named Rabbitt "Top New Male Vocalist of the Year". By that time, Rabbitt had a good reputation in Nashville and was being compared by critics to singer Kris Kristofferson. That year, at Knott's Berry Farm, Rabbitt appeared at the Academy of Country Music Awards and sang several of his songs from Rocky Mountain Music. He won the Top New Male Vocalist of the Year award.

=== Crossover success ===
While still relatively unknown, Rabbitt toured with and opened for crossover star Kenny Rogers, and also for Dolly Parton on a number of dates during her 1978 tour. Following the 1978 release of Variations, which included two more number-one hits, Rabbitt released his first compilation album, The Best of Eddie Rabbitt. It produced Rabbitt's first crossover single, "Every Which Way But Loose", which topped country charts and reached the top 30 on both the Billboard Hot 100 and Adult Contemporary, and was featured in the 1978 Clint Eastwood movie of the same title. The song also broke the record for highest chart debut, entering at number 18. Rabbitt held this record alone until it was matched by Garth Brooks's 2005 single "Good Ride Cowboy." The record was broken in 2006 upon the number-17 chart entrance of Keith Urban's "Once in a Lifetime." Rabbitt's next single, the R&B-flavored "Suspicions" from his 1979 album Loveline, was an even greater crossover success, reaching number one on Country charts, the top 15 on the Billboard Hot 100, and number five on the Adult Contemporary charts. He was given his own television special on NBC, first airing on July 10, 1980, which included appearances by such performers as Emmylou Harris and Jerry Lee Lewis. By this point, Rabbitt had been compared to a "young Elvis Presley".

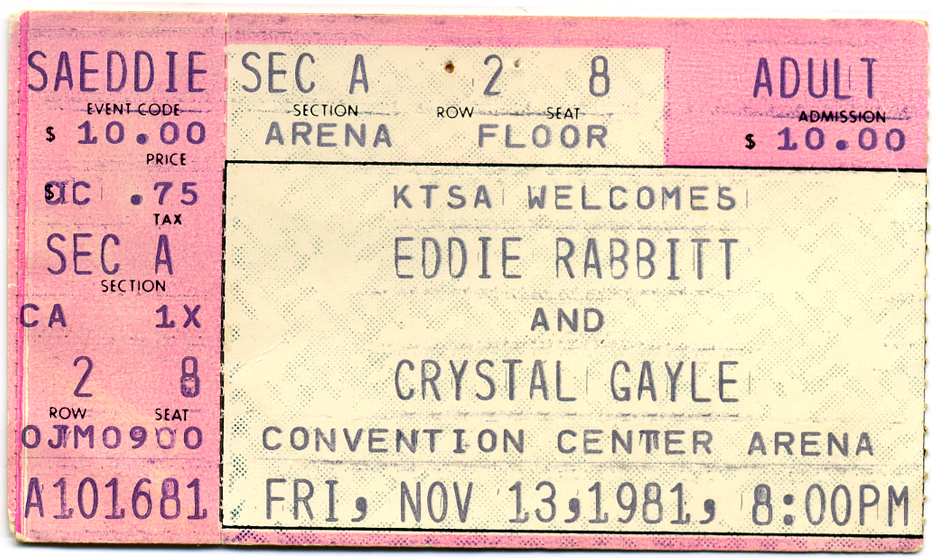
A ticket stub to an Eddie Rabbitt and Crystal Gayle joint performance in San Antonio, Texas, in 1981

Rabbitt's next album, Horizon, reached platinum status and contained the biggest crossover hits of his career, "I Love a Rainy Night" and "Drivin' My Life Away." Rabbitt developed "Rainy Night" from a song fragment he penned during a 1960s thunderstorm. "Drivin'" recalled Rabbitt's tenure as a truck driver, and was inspired by Bob Dylan's song "Subterranean Homesick Blues". His popularity was so great at this point that he was offered his own variety television show, which he respectfully declined, saying "It's not worth the gamble."

The release of his 1981 Step by Step album continued Rabbitt's crossover success as all three singles reached the top 10 on both Country and Adult Contemporary charts. The title track became Rabbitt's third straight single to reach the top five on the Country, Adult Contemporary, and Billboard Hot 100 charts. The album ultimately reached gold status, Rabbitt's last album to do so. Rabbitt teamed up with another country pop crossover star, Crystal Gayle, on "You and I", which was included on his 1982 album Radio Romance. The duet reached number one on the Billboard Country chart and became a pop smash, peaking at number seven and number two, respectively, on the Billboard Hot 100 and Adult Contemporary charts. It was used as a love theme for a couple on the soap opera All My Children. The song "You Put the Beat in My Heart" from Rabbitt's second compilation, Greatest Hits - Volume II (1983), was his last crossover hit, reaching number 15 on the Adult Contemporary chart.

=== Late career ===
During the 1980s, Rabbitt moved further from crossover-styled music. His 1984 album The Best Year of My Life produced a number-one country hit and three more top-10 country hits, but none had crossover success. The illness and subsequent death of his son put his career on hold following the 1985 RCA Records release Rabbitt Trax, which included the number one "Both to Each Other (Friends and Lovers)", a duet with country pop star Juice Newton. Like "You and I", the song was used as the theme for a soap opera, Days of Our Lives.

Rabbitt returned from his hiatus in 1988 with the release of I Wanna Dance With You, which despite somewhat negative reviews produced two number-one songs, a cover of Dion's "The Wanderer" and the album's title track. Additionally, "We Must Be Doin' Somethin' Right" entered the top 10, although the album's final single "That's Why I Fell in Love with You" stalled at number 66. Rabbitt's Capitol Records album Jersey Boy was reviewed positively, as was its single "On Second Thought", Rabbitt's last number-one hit. The album also included "American Boy", a patriotic tune popular during the Gulf War and used in Bob Dole's 1996 presidential campaign.

Rabbitt was among the many country singers who suffered a dramatic decline in chart success beginning in 1991. That year, he released Ten Rounds, which produced the final charting single of his career, "Hang Up the Phone". Following that release, he left Capitol Records to tour with his band Hare Trigger.

In 1997, Rabbitt signed with Intersound Records, but was soon diagnosed with lung cancer. After a round of chemotherapy, he released the album Beatin' the Odds. In 1998, he released his last studio album, Songs from Rabbittland.

== Musical styles ==
Rabbitt used innovative techniques to tie country music themes with light rhythm and blues-influenced tempos. His songs often used echo, as Rabbitt routinely sang his own background vocals. In a process called the "Eddie Rabbitt Chorale", Rabbitt compensated for what Billboard Magazine described as a "somewhat thin and reedy voice" by recording songs in three-part harmonies. His music was compared to rockabilly, particularly the album Horizon, which was noted as having an Elvis-like sound. Rabbitt remarked that he liked "a lot of the old Memphis sounds that came out of Sun Records" during the 1950s, and that he "wanted to catch the magic of a live band". He credited such wide-ranging artists as Bob Dylan, Steely Dan, Elvis Presley, and Willie Nelson with influencing his works. When putting together an album, Rabbitt tried to make sure he put in "ten potential singles...no fillers, no junk." He remembered listening to albums as a child and hearing "two hits and a bunch of garbage".

Rabbitt believed that country music was "Irish music" and that "the minor chords in [his] music gave it that mystical feel". Although he did not strive to produce pop music, his songs helped influence the direction of country music, leading to the Urban Cowboy era during the 1980s. Critic Harry Sumrall of the San Jose Mercury News said that Rabbitt was "like a hot corn dog: nothing fancy, nothing frilly. You know what you're getting and you like it...never a country purist, Rabbitt nonetheless makes music that is plain and simple, with all of the virtues that make good country good. [His songs] might be brisk, but they are also warm and familiar, like the breeze that wafts in over the fried artichokes."

During the early 1990s, Rabbitt voiced criticism of hip hop music, particularly rap, which he said was sending a negative message to youth. He stated that the music was "inciting a generation" and that it had helped to contribute to the high rates of teenaged pregnancy, high-school dropouts, and rapes during this period.

== Personal life ==
When Rabbitt arrived in Nashville during the late 1960s, a friend gave him a pet chicken. Rabbitt said he had "an affinity for animals", and he kept the bird for a while before giving it to a farmer. During his Nashville days in the early 1970s, Rabbitt had a pet monkey, Jojo. Before his Rocky Mountain Music tour, the monkey bit Rabbitt, leaving his right arm in bandages.

In 1976, Rabbitt married Janine Girardi, whom he called "a little thing about five feet tall, with long, black beautiful hair, and a real pretty face". He had previously written the songs "Pure Love" and "Sweet Janine" for her. They had three children, Demelza, Timmy, and Tommy. Timmy was diagnosed with biliary atresia upon birth. The condition required a liver transplant for survival and he underwent one in 1985, but the attempt failed and he died. Rabbitt temporarily put his career on hiatus, saying, "I didn't want to be out of the music business, but where I was was more important."

Rabbitt felt his responsibility as an entertainer was to be a good role model and he was an advocate for many charitable organizations, including the Special Olympics, Easter Seals, and the American Council on Transplantation, of which he served as honorary chairman. He also worked as a spokesman for the Muscular Dystrophy Association and United Cerebral Palsy.

Rabbitt was a registered Republican and allowed Bob Dole to use his song "American Boy" during Dole's 1996 presidential campaign.

Rabbitt was also a fan of Star Trek: The Next Generation and visited the set during the show's fifth season in 1991–92.

== Death ==
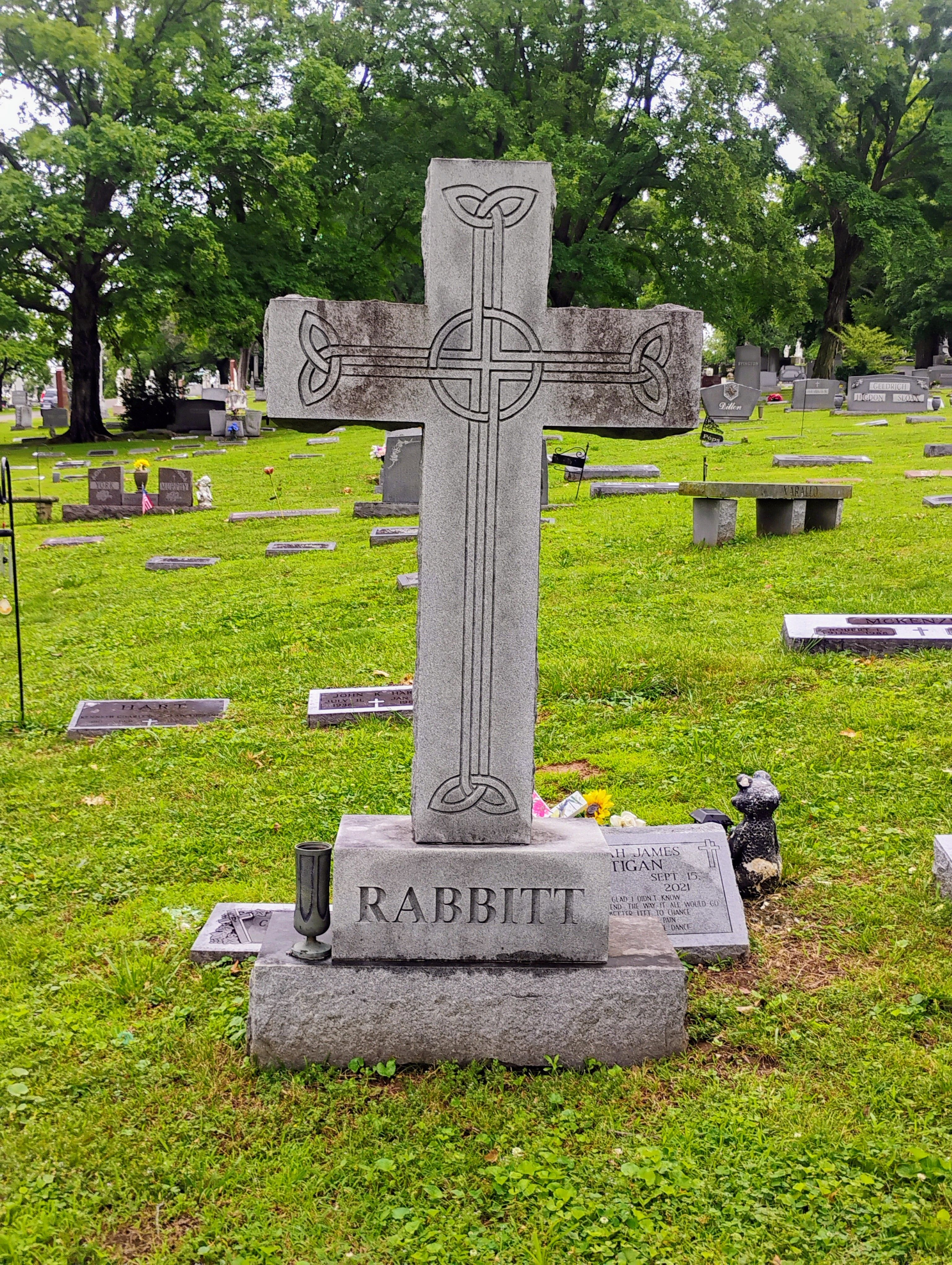
Rabbitt's grave in 2025

Rabbitt died on May 7, 1998, in Nashville from lung cancer at the age of 56. He had been diagnosed with the disease in March 1997 and had received radiation treatment and surgery to remove part of one lung. His body was interred at Calvary Cemetery in Nashville on May 8. No media outlets reported the death until after the burial at the family's request.

The news came as a surprise to many in Nashville, including the performer's agent, who "had no idea Eddie was terminal" and had talked to him often, remarking that Rabbitt "was always upbeat and cheerful" in the final months of his life. Although he was widely believed to have been born in 1944 (this year can still be found in older publications and texts), at the time of his death, he was revealed to have been born in 1941.

== Awards and nominations ==
=== As a songwriter ===
Year	Organization	Award
1979	Music City News	Country Songwriter of the Year
1979	BMI	Robert J. Burton Award ("Suspicions")
1980	BMI	Song of the Year ("Suspicions")
1981	Grammy Awards	Nominated for Best Country Song ("Drivin' My Life Away")
1996	BMI	Three Million-Air award ("I Love a Rainy Night")
1996	BMI	Two Million-Air award ("Kentucky Rain")
1998	Nashville Songwriters Foundation	Nashville Songwriters Hall of Fame
2016	ACM Honors	ACM Poet's Award

=== Grammy Awards ===
Year	Nominee / work	Award	Result
1980	"Every Which Way but Loose"	Best Male Country Vocal Performance	Nominated
1981	"Drivin' My Life Away"	Best Male Country Vocal Performance	Nominated
1982	"Step by Step"	Best Male Country Vocal Performance	Nominated

=== American Music Awards ===
Year	Nominee / work	Award	Result
1980	"Suspicions"	Favorite Country Single	Nominated
1982	Eddie Rabbitt	Favorite Pop/Rock Male Artist	Nominated

=== Academy of Country Music Awards ===
Year	Nominee / work	Award	Result
1978	Eddie Rabbitt	Top New Male Vocalist	Won
1979	Eddie Rabbitt	Top Male Vocalist of the Year	Nominated
1981	Eddie Rabbitt	Top Male Vocalist of the Year	Nominated
1981	Eddie Rabbitt	Entertainer of the Year	Nominated
1981	"Drivin' My Life Away"	Single Record of the Year	Nominated
1983	Crystal Gayle and Eddie Rabbitt	Top Vocal Duo of the Year	Nominated

=== Country Music Association Awards ===
Year	Nominee / work	Award	Result
1983	Eddie Rabbitt and Crystal Gayle	Vocal Duo of the Year	Nominated
