= Even Stevens (songwriter) =

American songwriter

- Born: Bruce Noel Stevens; Cincinnati, Ohio, U.S.
- Origin: Nashville, Tennessee, U.S.
- Genres: Country
- Occupation: Songwriter
- Years active: 1974-1999
- Label: Elektra

Bruce Noel "Even" Stevens is an American songwriter. He is known for his collaborations with Eddie Rabbitt, and has also written songs for the Oak Ridge Boys.

== Biography ==
Stevens was born in Cincinnati and grew up in Lewistown, Ohio. His father, who was a minister, introduced him to music through their local touring and recording family group, The Gospel Balladeers. He was educated at the Indian Lake High School.

After finishing his education, Stevens briefly pursued barbering before joining the U.S. Coast Guard as a Morse Code operator. Stationed in California, he began performing in local folk clubs, penning songs, and selling his artwork. Returning to Ohio, Stevens planned to enroll in art school. However, an invitation from his musician uncle, Bob, led him to relocate to Nashville, Tennessee in 1970, a temporary visit that evolved into a permanent stay.

Stevens survived on minimal accommodations, worked as an airport parking lot attendant, and began collaborating with fellow budding songwriter, Eddie Rabbitt, in 1972. The pair, alongside David Malloy, formed a publishing venture, DebDave/Briarpatch. In 1973, Stevens saw his first song, "I'm in for Stormy Weather," performed by Sammi Smith.

Early adopters of Stevens' work included artists such as George Jones, Stella Parton, and Billy Walker. Rabbitt began achieving success with their co-written songs in 1975, leading to numerous No. 1 hits.

Stevens recorded an album titled Thorn on the Rose in 1977, and several singles for Elektra Records between 1975 and 1978 but discovered a stronger affinity for songwriting over performing.

The Malloy/Rabbitt/Stevens trio saw significant success with songs like "I Love a Rainy Night," "Drivin' My Life Away," and "Step By Step," becoming pop-crossover sensations in 1980–81. "Suspicions," another joint effort, was named BMI's 1980 Country Song of the Year.

Stevens' other successful collaborations resulted in hits like Conway Twitty's "Crazy in Love" (1990), Ricky Skaggs' "Lovin' Only Me" (1989), and The Oak Ridge Boys' "No Matter How High" (1989). He also penned the 1979 Dr. Hook pop hit "When You're in Love with a Beautiful Woman" solo.

The song "Love Will Turn You Around," co-written with Thom Schuyler, David Malloy, and its performer, Kenny Rogers, was ASCAP's 1982 Country Song of the Year. Stevens also received accolades for a series of Miller Beer jingles.

By 2015, he had garnered 55 BMI songwriting honors.

== Discography ==
Year	Single	Peak chart positions
Year	Single	US Country
1975	"Let the Little Boy Dream"	38
1975	"Huckelberry Pie" (with Sammi Smith)	81
1977	"The King of Country Music Meets the Queen of Rock & Roll" (with Sherry Grooms)	97
