= Greatest Hits Vol. II (Eddie Rabbitt album) =

Greatest hits album by Eddie Rabbitt
- Released: 1983
- Genre: Country
- Length: 37:35
- Label: Warner Bros. Records
- Producer: David Malloy

Eddie Rabbitt chronology
Radio Romance (1982)	Greatest Hits Vol. II (1983)	The Best Year of My Life (1984)

Greatest Hits Vol II is the second compilation album by American country music artist Eddie Rabbitt. It was released in 1983 via Warner Bros. Records. The albums includes the singles "You Put the Beat in My Heart" and "Nothing Like Falling in Love".

== Track listing ==
No.	Title	Writer(s)	Length
1.	"I Love a Rainy Night"	Eddie Rabbitt, Even Stevens, David Malloy	3:08
2.	"Drivin' My Life Away"	Rabbitt, Stevens, Malloy	3:14
3.	"Step by Step"	Rabbitt, Stevens, Malloy	3:41
4.	"You and I" (duet with Crystal Gayle)	Frank J. Myers	3:56
5.	"Suspicions"	Rabbitt, Stevens, Malloy, Randy McCormick	4:19
6.	"You Put the Beat in My Heart"	Don Pfrimmer, Rick Giles	4:49
7.	"Nothing Like Falling in Love"	Thom Schuyler, Jim Schnaars	3:59
8.	"Someone Could Lose a Heart Tonight"	Rabbitt, Stevens, Malloy	3:26
9.	"You Can't Run from Love"	Rabbitt, Stevens, Malloy	3:40
10.	"Gone Too Far"	Rabbitt, Stevens, Malloy	3:22

== Chart performance ==
Chart (1983)	Peak position
US Top Country Albums (Billboard)	4
US Billboard 200	131
