= Million Reasons =

2016 single by Lady Gaga

Single by Lady Gaga

from the album Joanne
- Released: October 29, 2016
- Studio: Shangri-La, Gypsy Palace (Malibu); Electric Lady (New York City)
- Genre: Country
- Length: 3:25
- Label: Streamline; Interscope
- Songwriters: Stefani Germanotta; Hillary Lindsey; Mark Ronson
- Producers: Ronson; Lady Gaga; BloodPop

Lady Gaga singles chronology
| "Perfect Illusion" (2016) | "Million Reasons" (2016) | "The Cure" (2017) |

Music video
- "Million Reasons" on YouTube

"Million Reasons" is a song recorded by American singer Lady Gaga for her fifth studio album, Joanne (2016). Initially released as a promotional single, it was released to radio stations on October 29, 2016, as the album's second single. The track was written by Gaga, Hillary Lindsey and Mark Ronson, and produced by Ronson, Gaga and BloodPop. It grew organically from the conversations that Lindsey and Gaga were having one day, with the title phrase lifted from the singer's musings about the men in her life.

The track is a country song with pop influences. It lyrically delves on "heartbreak and hope" during a relationship, as well as Gaga's religious faith during the chorus, ultimately making it a song with a positive message. Critics appreciated the track's simple production and lyrics. Commercially, "Million Reasons" reached the top 10 of the charts in Hungary, Slovakia, Switzerland, the United States, and Venezuela as well as the top 20 in Canada, Italy, and Scotland. The track received a nomination for Best Pop Solo Performance at the 60th Annual Grammy Awards.

An accompanying music video was directed by Ruth Hogben and Andrea Gelardin, and continues the story established in the video for her previous single, "Perfect Illusion". It shows Gaga singing in a white studio, and also her in a desert, breaking down before being rescued by her friends. In order to promote "Million Reasons", the singer performed it on her Dive Bar Tour (2016), multiple television appearances, the Victoria's Secret Fashion Show 2016, the Super Bowl LI halftime show, the 2017 Coachella Valley Music and Arts Festival, the 60th Grammy Awards, Joanne World Tour (2017–2018) and the Mayhem Ball (2025-2026). Cover versions of the song were recorded by singer Kelsea Ballerini and the duo of Bob Weir and Trey Anastasio.

== Background and release ==
Following the release of lead single "Perfect Illusion" on September 9, 2016, Gaga announced the Dive Bar Tour, a promotional concert series where the singer performed at various dive bars in the United States. However, the venues for the concert series remained undisclosed to have a more intimate approach. The campaign was sponsored by Bud Light, and premiered on October 5, 2016. Simultaneously, a live broadcast of the event was streamed on Bud Light's official Facebook page. On October 2, 2016, several publications claimed that during the first show of the tour, a new song titled "Million Reasons" would be performed, in addition to "Perfect Illusion".

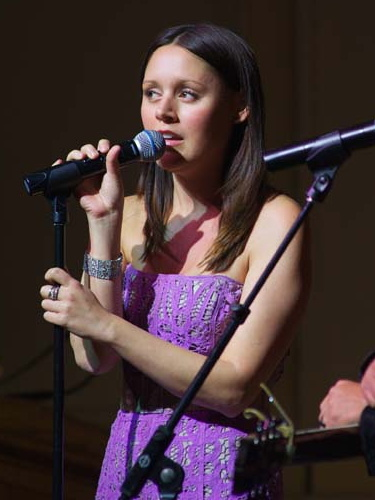
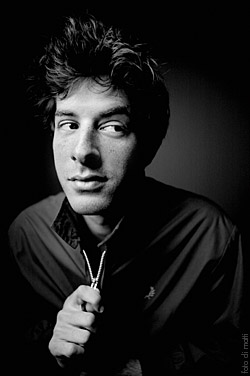
Hillary Lindsey (left) and Mark Ronson (right) co-wrote "Million Reasons" with Gaga.

During the Dive Bar Tour, Gaga recalled that she and musician Hillary Lindsey were seated in couches and having a back-and-forth conversation with guitar and piano. The singer asked questions about the men in her life, including her father and boyfriends, wondering why they would give her million reasons to leave them, but all she wanted was to have one reason to stay. Lindsey, who previously had experiences in writing country songs in Nashville, was identified by Interscope as a potential collaborator on Joanne. The label's A&R Aaron Bay-Schuck, who had heard the initial Joanne material, introduced Gaga to Lindsey. They bonded over drinks and Gaga also played initial demos of some of the tracks she had written. Lindsey remembered that Gaga's personal experiences and stories resulted in many ideas for songs. "Million Reasons" was similarly picked from their conversations, including the title phrase. It was a straightforward songwriting session according to Lindsey, with Gaga using an old school typewriter.

"Million Reasons" was made available as a promotional digital download to those who pre-ordered Joanne through iTunes on October 6, 2016. However, following the song's commercial surge when Gaga appeared on the Carpool Karaoke segment of The Late Late Show with James Corden, "Million Reasons" was selected as the second single from Joanne. It was released to American contemporary hit radio stations on November 8, 2016.

== Recording and composition ==
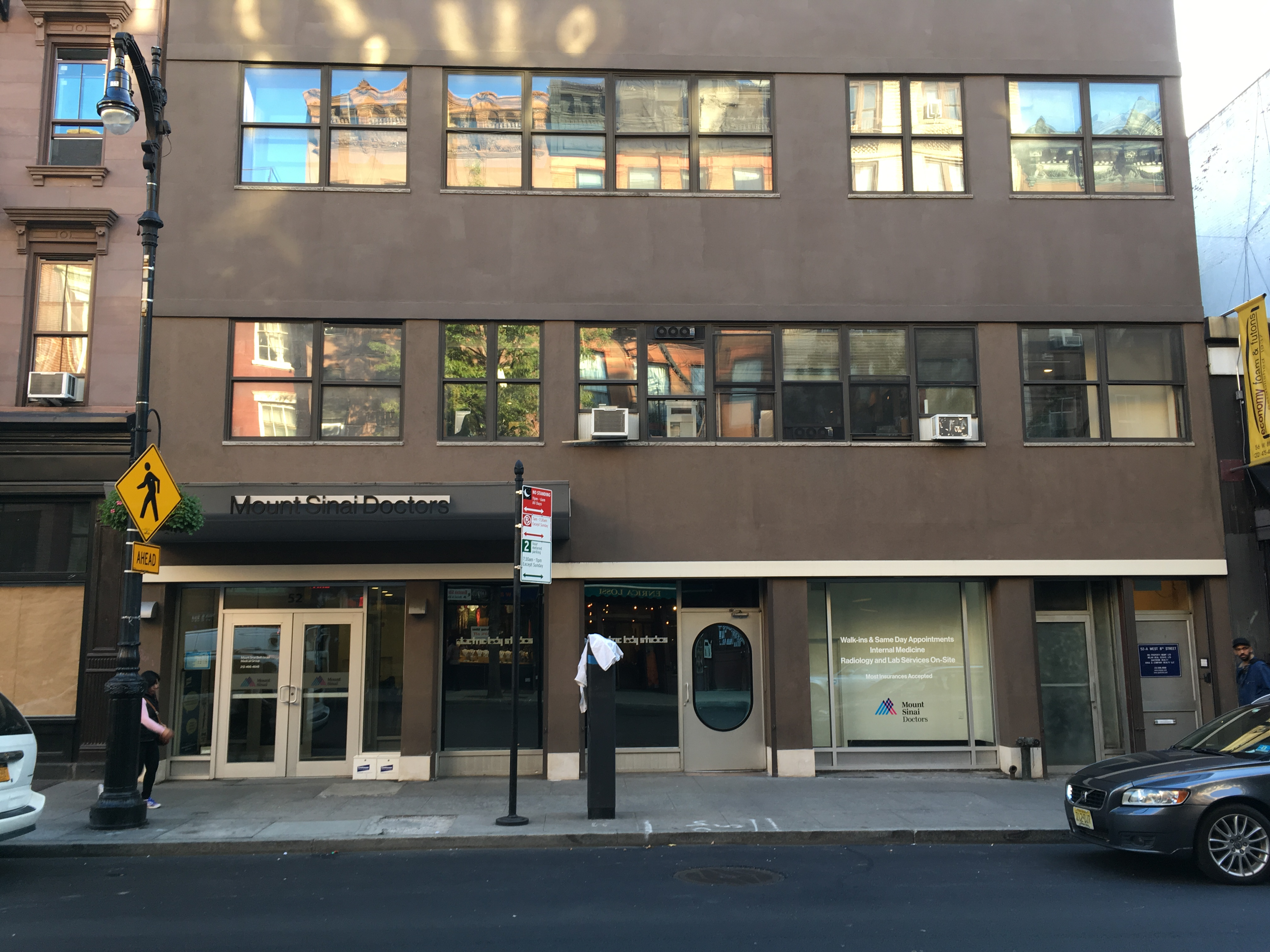
Electric Lady Studios, one of the recording locations of the song

Gaga co-wrote and co-produced "Million Reasons" alongside Mark Ronson, while Lindsey and BloodPop provided additional songwriting and production, respectively. The track was recorded and mixed at Shangri-La and Gypsy Palace Studios in Malibu, California, as well as Electric Lady Studios in New York by Joshua Blair, Joe Visciano and Brandon Bost. The mastering was performed at Sterling Sound Studios by Tom Coyne and Randy Merrill. Instrumentation for the song included piano by Gaga, guitars by Lindsey and Ronson. BloodPop handled the additional instrumentation including keyboards, rhythm track and string programming.

"Million Reasons" has been described as a country ballad. According to Emily Mackay of NME, "Million Reasons" serves as a "potent, sky-clutching reminder of Gaga's way with a bare-bone ballad". Gaga described the track as "a country song mixed with funk and rock ‘n’ roll", with "a hip-hop feeling" despite not being a hip-hop song itself. Idolator's Patrick Bowman agreed and described it as a "country-tinged [...] quiet ballad" while Stephen L. Betts from Rolling Stone called it a pop song which had a country music appeal, similar to singer Beyoncé's "Daddy Lessons". Michael Cragg from The Guardian found this reminiscent of Carrie Underwood's characteristic style, which he called country balladry. Lyndsey Parker from Yahoo! Music joked that it was obviously written by country music artists. In the composition, the singer's vocals are layered among "faintly strummed guitars" and varying degrees of percussion. Gaga described the genre as a "country song mixed with funk and rock 'n' roll" and felt that the composition was unexpected, with underlying tones of hip-hop.

"Million Reasons" is written in the key of C major with its tempo swinging around 64 beats per minute, and is accompanied by piano and guitar. Gaga's vocals span from G_{3} to E_{5} in the song, which in common time, follows a progression of C–Am–F–G, with a chorus of F–C–Am–G. During the song's chorus, Gaga croons "You're giving me a million reasons to let you go / You're giving me a million reasons to quit the show". Its discussion of heartbreak and hope, as described by International Business Times's Nicholas Mojica, was guaranteed to "resonate with [the] listeners" of the record. Bustle's Amy Roberts theorized that, like most of the songs from Joanne, "Million Reasons" had extra hidden depth in its lyrics and predicted it to be about Gaga's separated boyfriend Taylor Kinney. The phrase "quit the show" was described as a metaphor by Roberts about Gaga feeling dejected about her life, with the second verses confirming this. Both romantic heartbreak as catalyst and religious faith of the singer were represented as different sides of the lyrics. Roberts concluded by saying that "[t]hough the song may seem extremely fraught with sadness, confusion and heartache, its main message appears to be a pretty positive one".

== Critical reception ==
"Million Reasons"
A 19 second sample of "Million Reasons", which illustrates the first chorus of the track, with the layered vocals from Gaga, and the different percussion instruments used. The lyrics also showcase the romantic heartbreak and religious faith of the singer in them.

Cady Lang, writing for Time appreciated the touching quality of the recording's nature, which she described as heartbreaking. Craig Jenkins of Vulture compared its potential appeal to "Daddy Lessons" as well and felt they both shared a "big left-field bid for country-radio airplay". International Business Times''s Nicholas Mojica ranked "Million Reasons" at number six on his list of the best songs from Joanne; he acclaimed its lyrics and noted the contributions made by Lindsey.

The staff at Idolator selected "Million Reasons" to review as part of their 'Rated & Reviewed' column series. Robbie Daw from the publication congratulated the singer for creating a "super-produced" country version of her 2011 single "You and I". Rachel Sonis agreed and found it to be simple and sweet, awarding the track a rating of 8.5 out of 10. However, both Carl Williott and Mike Wass were disappointed, with the latter claiming: "this era is shaping up to be even worse than I imagined." It ultimately received an average score of 6.1/10 from the writers. Similarly, Bowman from the same website called it one of Joanne's "more forgettable tracks". Although The Atlantic's Spencer Kornhaber found it to be a "sturdily crafted" single, he found Gaga to be neglectful of the song's details and claimed that American singer-songwriter Taylor Swift could excel exceptionally better at the same craft. Kristen S. Hé of Vulture felt the song is elevated by Gaga's "raw vocals", "though the lyrics and bland arrangement lack the precise, lived-in details of a truly great country song."

Billboard ranked "Million Reasons" at number 35 on their "100 Best Pop Songs of 2016" list. Rena Gross from the magazine said that "traffic-stopping vocal delivery perfectly encapsulates our longing for the impossible". Gary Trust from the publication wrote an article titled "With 'Million Reasons,' Is Lady Gaga Bringing Back 'The Vocalist Era'?" where he interviewed radio programmers and theorized that the track "is reminding radio, and fans, of Gaga's talents, beyond her trademark quirky costumes and persona". The programmers commented that the traditional nature of the track was suited for playing on contemporary American radio. "Million Reasons" received a nomination in the category for Best Pop Solo Performance at the 60th Annual Grammy Awards.

== Chart performance ==
Gaga singing "Million Reasons" at the 2016 Royal Variety Performance

Following its original announcement as Joanne's first promotional single, "Million Reasons" entered several record charts. In the United States, it debuted at number 76 on the Billboard Hot 100, becoming her 24th career entry and second from Joanne. It later reached number 57 on the Hot 100. The entry was aided by sales of 15,000 digital downloads, which allowed it to enter the Digital Songs component chart at number 38. The song debuted at number 38 on the Mainstream Top 40 chart for the week ending December 13, 2016. The same week, after Gaga's performance at the 2016 Victoria's Secret Fashion Show, "Million Reasons" reached a new peak of number 52 on the Hot 100. The placement was aided by sales of 44,000 digital downloads (up 144%), which enabled it to jump from number 34 to number six on the Digital Songs, becoming her 16th top-10 song on the chart. It has been streamed 24.4 million times in the country.

Following Gaga's Super Bowl LI halftime show performance, "Million Reasons" re-entered the Hot 100 at number four, equaling the record set by LL Cool J and Jennifer Lopez' "Control Myself" for the then-highest re-entry in the chart's history; the record was broken by The Weeknd's "Blinding Lights" in January 2021. The placement was aided by the song reaching number one on the Digital Songs Chart with sales of 149,000 copies (up by 1,334%), 7.6 million US streams and 15 million in radio airplay. "Million Reasons" became Gaga's 14th top-10 release in the country, and her first single to achieve that ranking since "Applause" (2013).

It was also her fifth number one on the Digital Songs chart since "Born This Way", which held the top position in 2011. "Million Reasons" debuted on the Radio Songs chart at number 36 with 32 million audience impressions, and has reached a peak of number 24 on the chart. It also achieved peaks of numbers 17 and 5 on the Mainstream Top 40 and Adult Top 40 charts respectively. The top ten placement in the Adult Top 40 chart was her first since "Applause" also reached the same peak in 2013. "Million Reasons" has been certified triple platinum by the Recording Industry Association of America (RIAA), and sold 1.1 million digital copies in the United States as of February 2018.

The song debuted at number 48 in the United Kingdom and peaked at number 11 in Scotland, in charts compiled and published by the Official Charts Company. Following Gaga's performance of the song at The X Factor, "Million Reasons" re-entered the UK Singles Chart at number 60, with sales of 10,396 copies. It further climbed up the charts the next week, aided by the performance on Alan Carr and its music video. The track moved from number 60 to number 39, with sales of 15,943 units, reaching a new peak on the UK Singles Chart and becoming Gaga's 18th top 40 single. In France, it debuted at number 107 according to SNEP, and was the ninth highest entry for the week of October 8, 2016. The following week, it peaked at number 29 and became the chart's highest moving entry, jumping a total of 76 positions. Elsewhere, it peaked at number 34 in Australia and number seven in Switzerland, becoming her highest peak in the latter since "Applause" in 2013.

== Music video ==
=== Background and synopsis ===
An accompanying music video for "Million Reasons" was directed by Ruth Hogben and Andrea Gelardin, who had also helmed the video for the previous single, "Perfect Illusion". Gaga announced that the music video for "Million Reasons" would be a continuation of that for "Perfect Illusion". It was released on December 14, 2016, on MTV followed by a worldwide release to Vevo. The video begins with the singer laying across the desert floor from the ending of "Perfect Illusion" during sunset, as black SUVs approach her from afar. Gaga's crew comes out of the SUVs and takes her to a video shoot where she prepares to sing "Million Reasons". As she starts getting ready, the singer notices a small box with a bow atop it on her desk. The video then intercuts to a number of flashbacks—Gaga singing in a white studio while playing the guitar, getting rescued by her friends from the desert and breaking down in tears. Finally Gaga opens the box which reveals the content to be a rosary with a note saying "Love you, sis".

=== Reception and analysis ===
Gaga in the music video being consoled by her friends, a narrative which was critically analyzed by Ian David Monroe from V magazine as a poignant moment of the clip showing Gaga's life journey.

Ian David Monroe from V found the video to "stark contrast" with the one for "Perfect Illusion". He noticed that it did not portray a "traditional love narrative", rather focused on Gaga's own team. Monroe theorized that with the recent reveal by Gaga that she suffered from Posttraumatic stress disorder (PTSD) in an open letter, the continued theme between the videos made sense. Along with the essay, the videos portrayed Gaga being handled roughly in her early career, forced to tour through her hip pain (described by the dancing in "Perfect Illusion"), and finally in the "Million Reasons" clip, her team helps her in healing and crafting Joanne.

Brian Joseph from Spin found the video's portrayal of Gaga as "emotionally transparent" and added that the video was in line with the "emotionally vulnerable themes running throughout [Joanne]". Julianne Shepherd from Jezebel compared Gaga's looks in the video to that of singer Stevie Nicks, "with a filmic play on the rock-and-roll mythos, attaching imagery of everyday backstage tour preparation to a song of loneliness and isolation, life on the road forever breaking its practitioners."

Evan Ross Katz from Mic described the video as a "highly spiritual journey" like some of the singer's previous clips. Justin Harp from Digital Spy described the clip as "breathtaking" and "poignant", adding that it "highlights the theme of loss and ultimately redemption" as enamored in the song. Bustle's Shannon Carlin felt that the "emotional" video "will make fans and non-fans look at [Gaga] differently". Carlin compared it to the video of singer Christina Aguilera's 2002 single "Beautiful", which had similar emotional and empowerment visuals, and finally added: "Like Aguilera, Gaga is giving you a sense of who she is by stripping back all that pomp and circumstance of her early years and giving fans something raw."

== Live performances ==
"Million Reasons" was performed live for the first time on the Dive Bar Tour, on October 5, 2016. The performance occurred at a Nashville bar where Gaga was joined by Hillary Lindsey. Her rendition was considered as "heartfelt" by Brittany Spanos of Rolling Stone. She performed "A-Yo" and "Million Reasons" on Saturday Night Live on October 22, 2016. A stripped down performance for the latter had the singer sitting at the piano belting out the song, backed by vocals from Lindsey. Paste's Chris White called Gaga an "incredible performer and vocalist" based on the performances, adding that the singer "understands the stagecraft of playing live music on [the SNL stage]". An isolated mic feed from the performances was also highly praised for Gaga's vocal prowess. The following week after the performance, Gaga headed over to Japan to promote Joanne where she performed the track on the show SMAP×SMAP, sitting inside a giant lotus flower.

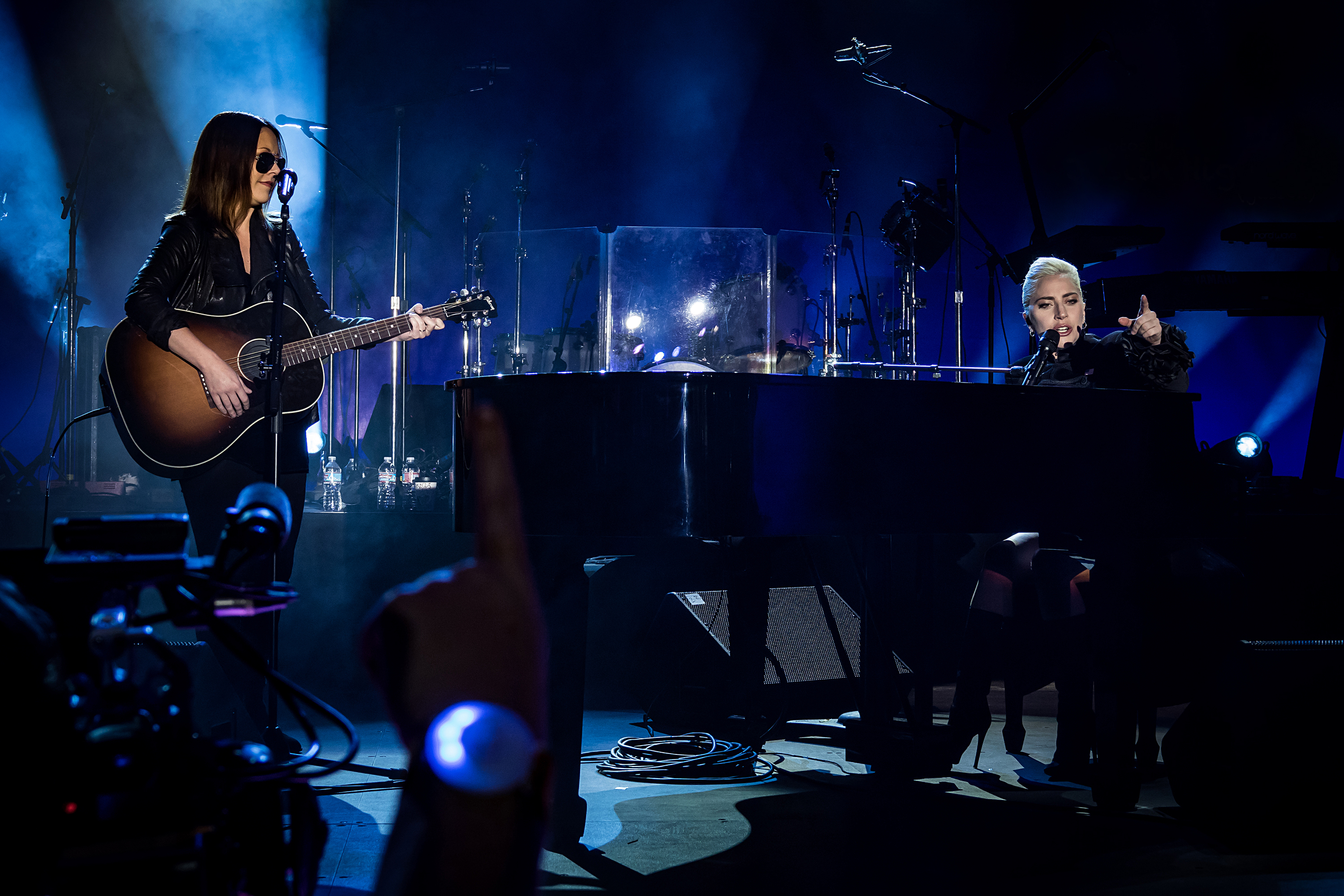
Gaga performing "Million Reasons" at the 2016 Airbnb Open Spotlight with Hillary Lindsey playing guitar

At the American Music Awards of 2016 she sang "Million Reasons" while playing a guitar, with the set resembling a camp ground. It received unanimous praise with Hilton Dresden from Out calling it a "heart-wrenching" rendition, while The Huffington Post's Cole Delbyck described it as "stirring" and "emotional". Billboard listed it as the third best performance of the night describing it as "resounding". A few days later Gaga visited the Ali Forney LGBT community centre and performed an acoustic version of "Million Reasons", seated atop a piano wearing a T-shirt that read "Be Brave".

The next performance of the song occurred at the 2016 Victoria's Secret Fashion Show in Paris. Prior to the actual performance onstage, Gaga sang the track backstage with some of the models from the show. For the performance Gaga wore a black dress with fish-tail train, printed with red roses, high neck and long sleeves. According to Bethan Holt of The Daily Telegraph, the look was a contrast to the scarce dressed models who walked past her waving. Delbyck wrote in The Huffington Post that Gaga sounded "off" during the performance, and noted her "awkward" interaction with the models. He also opined that songs from Joanne were not the best selection for a Victoria's Secret show. Later that year, Gaga was a surprise performer at the 2016 Airbnb Open Spotlight, where she performed the song with Lindsey, and appeared in the Carpool Karaoke segment of The Late Late Show with James Corden, with "Million Reasons" being the last song Gaga sang in the vehicle.

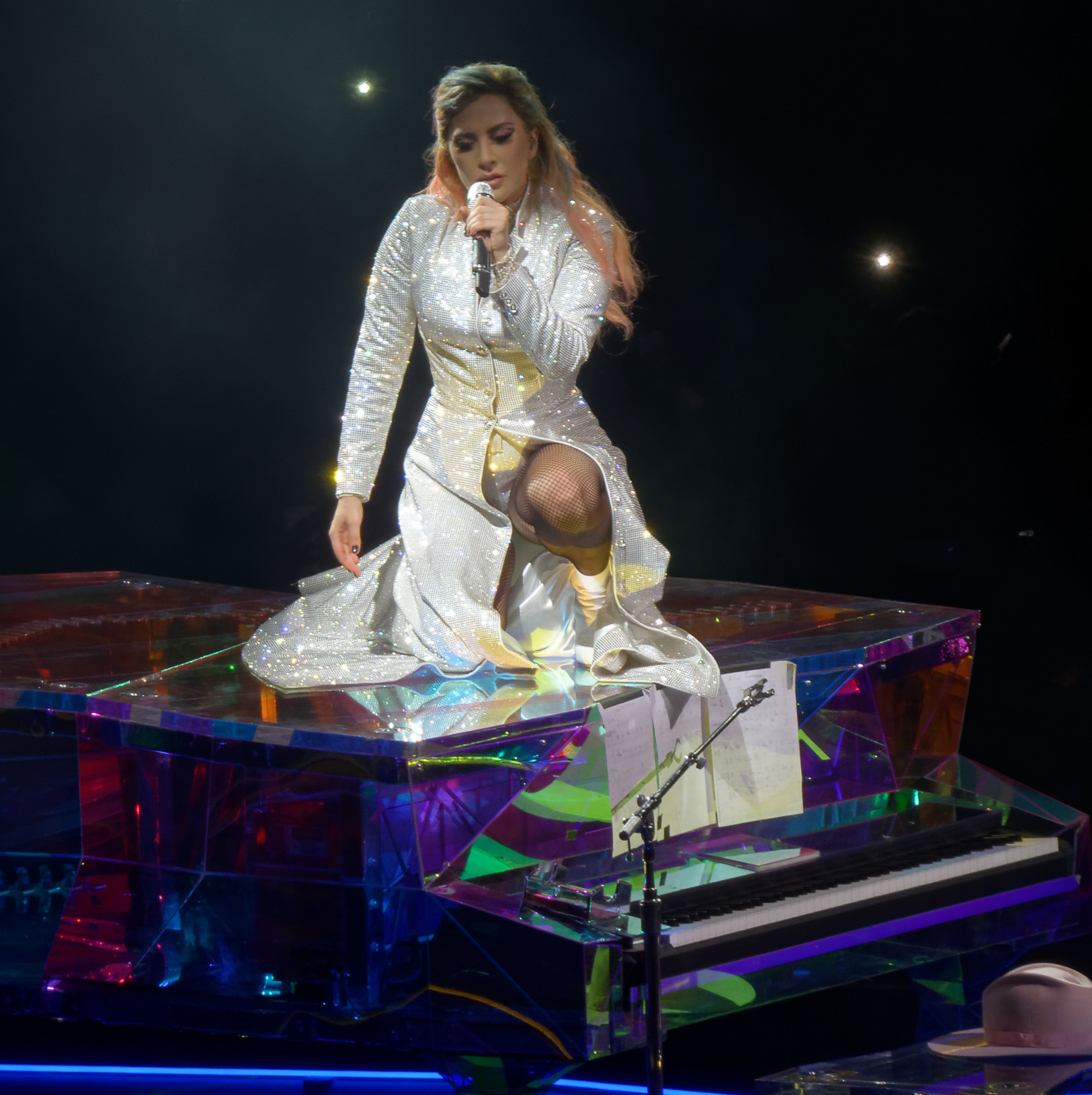
Gaga performing "Million Reasons" on top of a piano during the Joanne World Tour (2017–2018)

The singer began promoting Joanne in the United Kingdom with a surprise intimate gig at London's Shepherd's Bush Westfield shopping center, performing "Million Reasons" on piano. On December 4, 2016, she performed the song on the semi-final of the 13th season of The X Factor, at Fountain Studios in Wembley Park. She emerged from within the smoke and belted the track, later throwing her hat towards the audience and ripping off her leather jacket. Two days later, she performed the track at the 2016 Royal Variety Performance and on Alan Carr's Happy Hour.

On February 5, 2017, Gaga was the headliner of the Super Bowl LI halftime show and "Million Reasons" was part of the set list. The singer sat down at her piano inquiring about the audience and started belting the track. At the end she stepped in-between the audience and ended the song by hugging a woman. Tracy Gilchrist from The Advocate commended Gaga and found that the lyrics referred to the political environment in the United States following the election of Donald Trump. During her set at the 2017 Coachella Festival, Gaga performed the Andrelli remix of "Million Reasons". The song served as the encore to the Joanne World Tour (2017–2018), where Gaga was wearing the pink Joanne hat, a glittery robe coat and Giuseppe Zanotti shoes. She started playing the song on the piano, later standing on top of it.

In October 2017, Gaga had a surprise performance at the One America Appeal benefit concert in Texas, joining all five living former US presidents to raise money for those affected by the hurricane catastrophes of the year. She performed three of her songs—"Million Reasons", "You and I" and "The Edge of Glory". Gaga performed "Million Reasons" along with another track, "Joanne" at the 60th Annual Grammy Awards. She was dressed in a pink tulle gown with a train and dramatic sleeves and peach earrings. The singer played on a grand piano, covered with angel wings, while Ronson joined her on stage by playing on a guitar. The performance started with "Joanne", and after Gaga gave a shout-out to the Time's Up movement, she continued with "Million Reasons", later also standing up from the piano while singing the song. The performance concluded with Gaga lying backward onto the instrument. "Million Reasons" was part of the setlist of Gaga's 2018–2020 Las Vegas residency show, Enigma. Gaga performed the song on a piano with metallic wings sprouting from its base. In 2025, Gaga included "Million Reasons" on the setlist of The Mayhem Ball.

== Cover versions ==
Country singer Kelsea Ballerini recorded an unplugged version of "Million Reasons" and uploaded it on her Instagram account with the caption, "Gaga over this new Gaga, and as always, bowing down to Hillary Lindsey [for] writing the best songs". Isis Briones from Vogue praised the cover saying that Ballerini "stripped the track all the way down with just a guitar in hand and delivered an incredibly moving performance in just a few seconds. Not only will you want to replay this clip, but her voice on the song will get you to see in a completely different light." The Voice contestant Christian Cuevas performed a cover of the song during the eleventh season of the show. The performance was appreciated with the judges complimenting it for creating an "incredible moment" for the show. Gaga also tweeted her approval of Cuevas' singing prowess.

A collaborative cover version of the track was performed by Grateful Dead's Bob Weir and Phish's Trey Anastasio during the Wanee Music Festival in Florida. The duo played it on acoustic guitar, while alternating the leading and harmony vocals among themselves. Ryan Reed from Rolling Stone described the cover version as a "satisfyingly earthier angle on Gaga's Joanne ballad". As an opening act for singer Katy Perry's Witness: The Tour (2017–2018), Noah Cyrus performed a cover version of the song, during the first stop of the tour in Montreal, Canada.

== Track listing and format ==
Digital download – remix

1. "Million Reasons" (KVR remix) – 3:27
2. "Million Reasons" (Andrelli remix) – 4:00

== Credits and personnel ==
Credits adapted from the liner notes of Joanne.

=== Management ===
- Stefani Germanotta P/K/A Lady Gaga (BMI) Sony ATV Songs LLC / House of Gaga Publishing, LLC/ BIRB Music (ASCAP)
- All rights administered by BMG Rights Management LLC / Songs of Zella (BMI)
- Recorded at Shangri-La Studios, Gypsy Palace Studios (Malibu, California), Electric Lady Studios (New York)
- Mastered at Sterling Sound Studios (New York)

=== Personnel ===
- Lady Gaga – songwriter, vocals, producer, piano
- Hillary Lindsey – songwriter, additional vocals, guitar
- Mark Ronson – songwriter, producer, guitar, bass
- BloodPop – producer, keyboards, rhythm track, string programming for GenPop
- Joshua Blair – recording
- Joe Visciano – recording, mixing
- Brandon Bost – recording, mixing
- Tom Elmhirst – mixing
- Tom Coyne – mastering
- Randy Merrill – mastering
- David "Squirrel" Covell – recording assistant
- Barry McCreedy – recording assistant

== Charts ==
=== Weekly charts ===
Weekly chart performance for "Million Reasons"
| Chart (2016–2017) | Peak position |
|---|---|
| Australia (ARIA) | 34 |
| Austria (Ö3 Austria Top 40) | 52 |
| Belgium (Ultratip Bubbling Under Flanders) | 14 |
| Belgium (Ultratop 50 Wallonia) | 32 |
| Canada Hot 100 (Billboard) | 16 |
| Canada AC (Billboard) | 27 |
| Canada CHR/Top 40 (Billboard) | 37 |
| Canada Hot AC (Billboard) | 25 |
| Croatia International Airplay (Top lista) | 9 |
| Czech Republic Singles Digital (ČNS IFPI) | 48 |
| Euro Digital Songs (Billboard) | 12 |
| France (SNEP) | 29 |
| Germany (GfK) | 85 |
| Hungary (Single Top 40) | 10 |
| Ireland (IRMA) | 58 |
| Italy (FIMI) | 12 |
| New Zealand Heatseekers (RMNZ) | 2 |
| Portugal (AFP) | 53 |
| Scottish Singles Sales (Official Charts) | 11 |
| Slovakia Airplay (ČNS IFPI) | 8 |
| Slovakia Singles Digital (ČNS IFPI) | 9 |
| Spain (Promusicae) | 80 |
| Sweden (Sverigetopplistan) | 71 |
| Switzerland (Schweizer Hitparade) | 7 |
| UK Singles (Official Charts) | 39 |
| US Billboard Hot 100 | 4 |
| US Adult Contemporary (Billboard) | 14 |
| US Adult Pop Airplay (Billboard) | 5 |
| US Dance Club Songs (Billboard) | 33 |
| US Dance Airplay (Billboard) | 40 |
| US Pop Airplay (Billboard) | 17 |
| Venezuela English (Record Report) | 5 |

=== Year-end charts ===
2017 year-end chart performance for "Million Reasons"
| Chart (2017) | Position |
|---|---|
| Italy (FIMI) | 70 |
| Switzerland (Schweizer Hitparade) | 59 |
| US Adult Contemporary (Billboard) | 29 |
| US Adult Top 40 (Billboard) | 28 |
| US Digital Song Sales (Billboard) | 33 |

== Certifications and sales ==
Certifications and sales for "Million Reasons"
| Region | Certification | Certified units/sales |
|---|---|---|
| Australia (ARIA) | 4× Platinum | 280,000^{‡} |
| Austria (IFPI Austria) | Platinum | 30,000^{‡} |
| Brazil (Pro-Música Brasil) | Diamond | 250,000^{‡} |
| Canada (Music Canada) | Gold | 40,000^{‡} |
| Denmark (IFPI Danmark) | Gold | 45,000^{‡} |
| France (SNEP) | Platinum | 200,000^{‡} |
| Germany (BVMI) | Gold | 200,000^{‡} |
| Italy (FIMI) | 3× Platinum | 150,000^{‡} |
| New Zealand (RMNZ) | 3× Platinum | 90,000^{‡} |
| Norway (IFPI Norway) | Platinum | 60,000^{‡} |
| Poland (ZPAV) | 2× Platinum | 40,000^{‡} |
| Spain (Promusicae) | 2× Platinum | 120,000^{‡} |
| United Kingdom (BPI) | Platinum | 600,000^{‡} |
| United States (RIAA) | 3× Platinum | 3,000,000^{‡} |
Streaming
| Sweden (GLF) | Gold | 4,000,000^{†} |
^{‡} Sales+streaming figures based on certification alone.^{†} Streaming-only figures based on certification alone.

== Release history ==
Release dates and formats for "Million Reasons"
| Region | Date | Format(s) | Version | Label | Ref. |
|---|---|---|---|---|---|
| Various | October 5, 2016 (Note: Release as a promotional single.) | Digital download; streaming | Original | Interscope | |
| France | October 29, 2016 | Radio airplay | Original | Universal | |
| United States | November 8, 2016 | Contemporary hit radio | Original | Interscope | |
| Italy | November 25, 2016 | Radio airplay | Original | Universal | |
| Various | February 17, 2017 | Digital download; streaming | KVR remix | Interscope | |
| Various | March 17, 2017 | Digital download; streaming | Andrelli remix | Interscope | |

== See also ==
- List of Billboard Hot 100 top 10 singles in 2017
- List of Billboard number-one digital songs of 2017 (U.S.)
