= Nothing Like Falling in Love =

Single by Eddie Rabbitt

from the album Greatest Hits Vol. II
- B-side: "Gone Too Far"
- Released: November 1983
- Genre: Country
- Length: 2:58
- Label: Warner Bros. Nashville
- Songwriter(s): Thom Schuyler; Jim Schnaars
- Producer(s): Snuff Garrett; David Malloy

Eddie Rabbitt singles chronology
"You Put the Beat in My Heart" (1983)	"Nothing Like Falling in Love" (1983)	"B-B-B-Burnin' Up with Love" (1984)

"Nothing Like Falling in Love" is a song written by Thom Schuyler and Jim Schnaars, and recorded by American country music artist Eddie Rabbitt. It was released in November 1983 as the second single from his compilation album Greatest Hits Vol. II. The song reached number 10 on the Billboard Hot Country Singles chart in February 1984 and number 1 on the RPM Country Tracks chart in Canada.

== Chart performance ==
Chart (1983–1984)	Peak position
US Hot Country Songs (Billboard)	10
US Adult Contemporary (Billboard)	38
Canadian RPM Country Tracks	1
