= Lighthouse (Hearts & Colors song) =

2016 song by Hearts & Colors

"Lighthouse (Acoustic version)"

Single by Hearts & Colors

from the album Prologue (EP)
- Released: 24 April 2016
- Genre: Pop
- Length: 3:14
- Songwriter(s): Sam Ellis; Nicolai Kjellberg; Philip Tillström; Tebey Ottoh

"Lighthouse (Andrelli Remix)"

Single by Hearts & Colors
- Released: 21 November 2016
- Genre: Deep house, electronic
- Length: 3:38
- Songwriter(s): Sam Ellis; Nicolai Kjellberg; Philip Tillström; Tebey Ottoh

"Lighthouse" is a song by the Swedish acoustic duo Hearts & Colors (Philip Tillström and Nicolai Kjellberg). It was co-written by Sam Ellis and was first released on their YouTube account in April and was included on their first EP, Prologue, also as an acoustic version.

== Andrelli remix ==
The song achieved greater success when it was remixed by Andrelli. This version was released on 11 November 2016 and charted in Sweden, Norway, and also reached the Ultratip chart in Belgium (in both Flanders and Wallonia).

== Charts ==
Chart (2017)	Peak position
Czech Republic (Singles Digitál Top 100)	58
Netherlands (Single Top 100)	87
Norway (VG-lista)	10
Slovakia (Singles Digitál Top 100)	76
Sweden (Sverigetopplistan)	28

== Certifications ==
Region	Certification	Certified units/sales
Italy (FIMI)	Gold	25,000^{‡}
^{‡} Sales+streaming figures based on certification alone.
