= One America Appeal =

United States nonprofit organization

- Founded: September 7, 2017
- Founders: Jimmy Carter (†); George H. W. Bush (†); Bill Clinton; George W. Bush; Barack Obama
- Type: 501(c)(3)
- Purpose: Recovery efforts for Hurricanes Harvey, Irma and Maria
- Location: George Bush Presidential Library
- Region served: Texas, Florida, Puerto Rico and U.S. Virgin Islands
- Method: Donations
- Website: www.oneamericaappeal.org

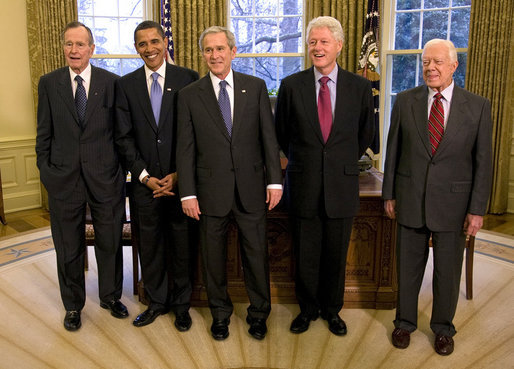
All five then-living former presidents George H. W. Bush, Barack Obama, George W. Bush, Bill Clinton, and Jimmy Carter. Photo was taken in the Oval Office 13 days prior to Obama's first inauguration in 2009.

The One America Appeal is a 501(c)(3) nonprofit organization founded on 7 September 2017, by all five then-living former U.S. Presidents: Jimmy Carter, George H. W. Bush, Bill Clinton, George W. Bush, and Barack Obama. This joint appeal originally aimed to encourage support for recovery efforts for Hurricane Harvey, but was then extended to include areas most affected by Hurricanes Irma and Maria. The appeal was launched when the five former presidents aired a joint PSA on the NFL's regular season opening broadcast.

All funds collected through this fund will go into a special account established through the George H. W. Bush Presidential Library Foundation and then all proceeds will be distributed to assist hurricane victims.

According to an update issued on 21 October 2017, the effort has raised $31 million in funds from more than 80,000 donors. The appeal concluded fundraising on 31 December 2017 and raised $41.3 million in total from around 110,500 donors.

== Benefit concert ==
A benefit concert, "Deep from the Heart: The One America Appeal", was held on 21 October 2017 at the Reed Arena at Texas A&M University in College Station and headlined by all five living former U.S. presidents (Barack Obama, George W. Bush, Bill Clinton, George H. W. Bush, and Jimmy Carter). Ticket sales and other proceeds went to the special hurricane recovery effort. The concert was hosted by Lee Greenwood, with Martin Guigui as Music Director, and featured the country music band Alabama, Sam Moore, Yolanda Adams, Lyle Lovett and Robert Earl Keen. Lady Gaga made a surprise appearance, performing "Million Reasons", "You and I" and "The Edge of Glory" at the concert. The Texas A&M University Singing Cadets also made an appearance to sing "The Star-Spangled Banner", "God Bless the USA" (alongside Greenwood), and "Lean on Me" at the end of the concert. A pre-taped video message from sitting US president Donald Trump was shown during the concert, in which he described the effort as "tremendous".

== Donations ==
Donations to the fund will be distributed to these organisations:

- Houston Harvey Relief Fund
- Rebuild Texas Fund
- Florida Disaster Fund
- Juntos y unidos por Puerto Rico
- The Fund for the Virgin Islands

== Founders ==
Five living former U.S. presidents were co-founders of the One America Appeal in 2017.

The group members often informally referred to as the Presidents Club.

Jimmy Carter (†)
39th President
served 1977–1981

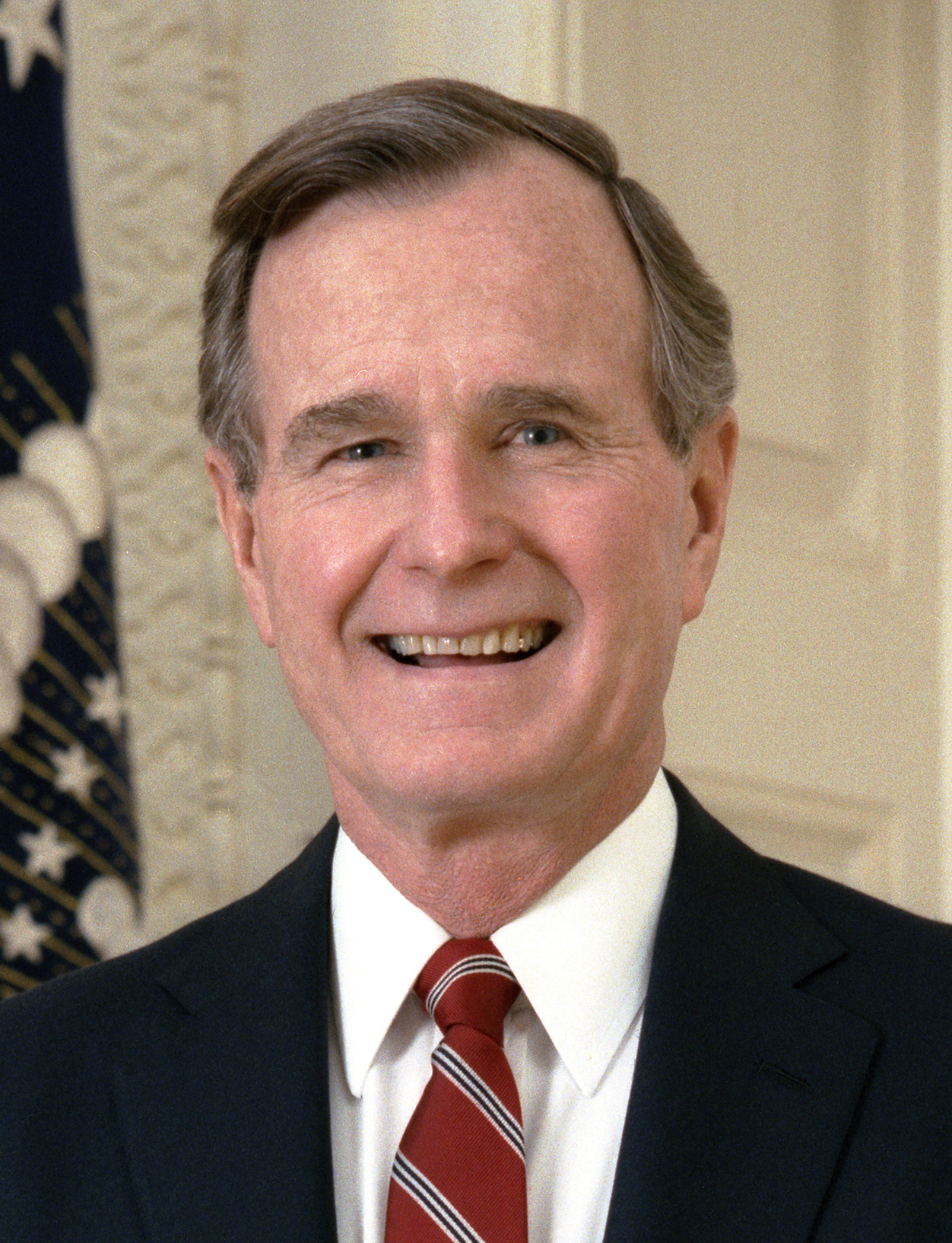
George H. W. Bush (†)
41st President
served 1989–1993

Bill Clinton
42nd President
served 1993–2001

George W. Bush
43rd President
served 2001–2009

Barack Obama
44th President
served 2009–2017

† George H.W. Bush died on 30 November 2018 and Jimmy Carter died on 29 December 2024.
