= Hearts & Colors =

Musical artist

- Born: Gothenburg, Sweden
- Origin: Gothenburg, Sweden
- Genres: Pop
- Years active: 2014–present
- Labels: Island Records
- Website: facebook.com/heartsandcolors

Hearts & Colors is a singer-songwriter duo from Gothenburg, Sweden, consisting of Philip Tillström & Nicolai Kjellberg. The band formed in 2014, and started off as an indie-folk duo, covering artists like One Direction and Bruno Mars on YouTube. They were initially signed to independent label Firefly entertainment, with their track "Lighthouse" by Swedish producer Andrelli, amassing over 1 million views on YouTube. They later moved on to writing their own material, and are signed with Island Records.

The band has released four songs: "Too Many Friends" in February 2018, and "Lying to Myself" and "Waterbed" simultaneously in June of the same year. Their fourth song "LA On A Saturday Night" was released in October 2018.

== Discography ==
=== Singles ===
Title	Details
"Steal My Girl"	2015
"Fireflies"	2015
"Lego House"	2015
"Can't Help Falling In Love"	2016
"Lighthouse - Andrelli Remix"	2016
"For The Love"	2017
"Shame"	2017
"Yung Luv"	2018
"Too Many Friends"	Released: 21 Feb 2018; Formats: Digital download
"Waterbed"	Released: 8 Jun 2018; Formats: Digital download
"Lying To Myself"	Released: 8 Jun 2018; Formats: Digital download
"LA On A Saturday Night"	Released: 19 Oct 2018; Formats: Digital download
"Lion"	2019
"I Don't Care"	2019
"I'm So Sorry"	2019
"FUCK IT UP"	2019
"Need Me"	2021
"Nobody Knows"	2022
