= Andrelli =

Swedish DJ and producer

- Born: Andrej Kamnik; Gothenburg, Sweden
- Genres: Deep house; tropical house
- Years active: 2014–present

Andrej Kamnik, better known by his stage name Andrelli, is a Swedish DJ and producer. He is best known for remixing Hearts & Colors' song Lighthouse and Lady Gaga's song "Million Reasons".

== Early life and career ==
Kamnik started playing the piano at the age of 5 and began producing electronic music at the age 14. At the age of 19, he formed the trance duo Andrelli & Blue with his brother's friend and signed to Infrasonic Recordings. Their debut single "Imagine" received support from notable DJs such as Armin van Buuren and Ferry Corsten. In 2009, Corsten requested the duo to remix his single "Lost".

Since 2014, Kamnik wrote music for pop musicians and in 2016, he gained international recognition for his remix of "Lighthouse", receiving over 69 million streams on Spotify.

His debut single was released in 2017, titled "Old Man", which was described as a "a marriage between progressive house, tropical house and future bass.".

== Discography ==
=== Singles ===
Title	Year	Peak chart positions			Certifications	Album
Title	Year	SWE	NL	NOR	Certifications	Album
"Lighthouse" (Andrelli Remix) (with Hearts & Colors)	2016	28	87	10	FIMI: Gold	Non-album singles
"Something More" (Andrelli Remix) (with Luke Potter)	2017	—	—	—		Non-album singles
"Old Man"	2017	—	—	—		Non-album singles
"Always You" (featuring Elle Winter)	2017	—	—	—		Non-album singles
"Yung Luv" (with Hearts & Colors)	2018	—	—	—		Non-album singles

=== Remixes ===
2016

- Hearts & Colors — "Lighthouse" (Andrelli Remix)

2017

- Rihanna — "Desperado" (Andrelli Remix)
- Lady Gaga — "Million Reasons" (Andrelli Remix)
