= Perfect Illusion =

2016 single by Lady Gaga

Single by Lady Gaga

from the album Joanne
- Released: September 9, 2016
- Recorded: 2016
- Studio: Shangri La (Malibu); Pink Duck (Burbank); Electric Lady (New York City)
- Genre: Dance-rock; synth-pop; electro-rock; pop rock
- Length: 3:02
- Label: Interscope
- Songwriters: Kevin Parker; Stefani Germanotta; Mark Ronson; Michael Tucker
- Producers: Ronson; Parker; Lady Gaga; BloodPop

Lady Gaga singles chronology
"Til It Happens to You" (2015)	"Perfect Illusion" (2016)	"Million Reasons" (2016)

Music video
- "Perfect Illusion" on YouTube

"Perfect Illusion" is a song recorded by American singer Lady Gaga. It was released for digital download on September 9, 2016, through Interscope Records as the lead single from her fifth studio album, Joanne (2016). The track was written and produced by Gaga, Kevin Parker, Mark Ronson and BloodPop. A dance-rock, synth-pop, electro-rock, and pop rock song, "Perfect Illusion" lyrically delves on the singer's "highest of highs and lowest of lows" in a relationship, and is ultimately a commentary on social media. Gaga wrote the lyrics using her Underwood typewriter; after numerous permutations the composers derived the final track. Speculation that the song referred to Gaga's ex-boyfriend Taylor Kinney was refuted by the singer.

The recording's release was preceded by multiple teasers and collage of images on the singer's social media accounts. Music critics gave mixed to positive reviews for "Perfect Illusion", with many of them noting similarities to the work of American musician Bruce Springsteen. Commercially, the song reached number 15 on the US Billboard Hot 100, as well as entered a number of subordinate charts. It achieved the top position in France and in the digital charts of Finland and Greece, and the top 10 in the Czech Republic, Hungary, Italy, Scotland and Slovakia.

The music video that accompanied "Perfect Illusion" was directed by Ruth Hogben and Andrea Gelardin. It premiered during the second season of television series Scream Queens on Fox. The video shows Gaga dancing and singing the song in a desert during a rave, with guest appearances by the songwriters and producers. Critics both praised and gave negative feedback regarding the simplicity of the clip. Gaga performed "Perfect Illusion" on her Dive Bar Tour and Joanne World Tour, as well during television and media appearances.

== Background and development ==
Following the release of her third studio album, Artpop (2013), Gaga changed management and joined Artist Nation—an artist management division of Live Nation Entertainment—along with her manager Bobby Campbell. She also underwent an image overhaul, showcasing more stress on her vocal prowess and subdued image in the media. Among other musical endeavors, Gaga released a collaborative jazz record with American singer Tony Bennett titled Cheek to Cheek in 2014, which won the Grammy Award for Best Traditional Pop Vocal Album. In January 2016, Gaga confirmed that she would be releasing her fifth studio album later that year, with her working on the logistics and aspects—including the looks she would portray for the record.

Throughout the majority of 2015 and 2016, Gaga teased the creative and recording process of the album on her social media accounts. It was also reported that she was seen collaborating with longtime producer RedOne, Giorgio Moroder, Mark Ronson, and Nile Rodgers, among others. Ronson confirmed their collaboration and added that the music recorded with Gaga was "some of [his] favorite music [he has] really ever worked on. It's incredible – [he loves] it. [He] can't wait until you can hear it because the music speaks for itself – it's some of [his] favorite musicians of all time are working on it." The producer additionally hinted the involvement of Kevin Parker, the frontman for the Australian psychedelic rock band Tame Impala, which BBC Music later confirmed to be true. In an interview with fashion website Buro247, Ronson claimed that it was one of his favourite recording that he had worked, and commended the associated musicians and writers.

== Writing and recording ==
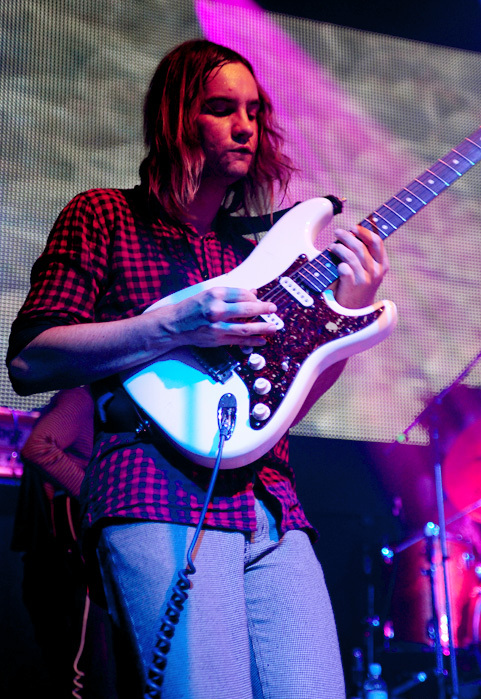
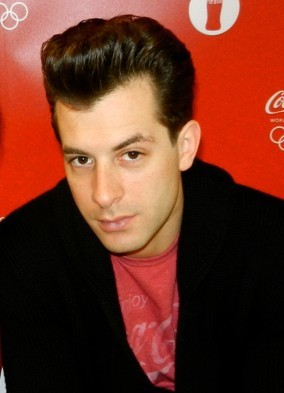
Kevin Parker (left) and Mark Ronson (right) co-wrote and co-produced "Perfect Illusion" with Gaga and BloodPop.

Gaga co-wrote and co-produced "Perfect Illusion" with Parker and Ronson, with additional production from BloodPop. The song fruited from a demo called "Illusion" which Parker developed and presented to Gaga and Ronson. The latter recruited BloodPop at the end of May 2016, after liking an album he was working on at the time for another singer. They met up in Malibu and completed "Perfect Illusion" within the first few days of their recording sessions. According to BloodPop, there was no conversation about what the song should sound like, they "all kind of spoke a similar language". The track's arrangement was done by Ronson who played synths and guitar with Parker. They were joined by Josh Homme on the guitar, while BloodPop developed the rhythm and synthesis, alongside Parker playing drums. Ronson and BloodPop's production were bridged together through Parker's use of Ableton.

At the session, Gaga led the direction of the production based on her preferences and influences, and used a piano and guitar to compose the song. Ronson explained that during their sessions Gaga was deeply involved with the technicalities of the music being recorded. Concerning this he confessed, "[Gaga] loves just sitting at a piano and barking orders at a drummer and she has an incredible voice," further clarifying that they would begin with the songs first and then go with the other aspects of the composition. In an interview for Rolling Stone, BloodPop recalled the singer being omnipresent always and it was her decisions which finalized the track's sound.

Gaga wrote the lyrics using her Underwood typewriter. They were developed several hours into the session, though according to BloodPop, "Every few days, a lyric would change and it'd get better and better". In an interview for BBC Radio 1, Gaga explained that they "would bounce lyrics back and forth", adding: "We stripped everything away. Changed the melody, shifted it. I sat at a piano, Kevin was on guitar, Mark was on the bass." Recording took place at various studios across the United States to fit in with each contributor's schedule. In Malibu, they recorded at Shangri-La Studios, which BloodPop preferred since it was outside the influence of city life. A few days of recording also took place at Gaga's home, and her vocals were recorded at Electric Lady Studios in New York City.

== Music and lyrical interpretation ==
"Perfect Illusion" is a pop, dance-rock, synth-pop, electro-rock, and pop rock track, which is composed around a building chord sequence, which BBC music reporter Mark Savage felt leads to a "compelling sense of urgency". The singer's vocals are kept raw and untreated on the song, eschewing Auto-Tune. The composition consists of "pulsing verses" and a guitar-and-vocal breakdown before the final chorus, with Gaga singing the main title multiple times. Around the two minute mark, there is a key change before the final chorus. Lewis Corner from Digital Spy felt that the track alluded to Gaga's previous album eras. He called its core a "simple pop song" which harked back to the singer's initial releases like "Just Dance" and "Poker Face" (both 2008). The mixture of guitar and the "grumbling" synths reminded Corner of Gaga's single "Marry the Night" from her second studio album, Born This Way (2011), along with the "thumping" beat. There were also allusions to the Artpop era due to the verse and the refrain being connected in an unconventional manner. Glamour and Rolling Stone reported that some listeners found similarities between the song and Madonna's "Papa Don't Preach" (1986); in response to the comparisons, Ronson told the latter magazine, "Obviously, that was some kind of accident".

"Perfect Illusion"
An 18 second sample of "Perfect Illusion", which illustrates the chorus of the song, with the guitar-and-vocal breakdown analyzed in the article, as well as the mixture of guitar and "grumbling" synths.

During an interview with Rolling Stone, BloodPop stated that "Perfect Illusion" is "a big rock song that makes you want to dance". According to him, during recording sessions they had not discussed about the actual sound of the track, rather make it non-derivative of anything on the radio. BloodPop also detailed the track as containing traditional songwriting and influences of soul, but not in a literal way. "Perfect Illusion" is written in the key of F♯ minor with a tempo of 125 beats per minute. The song is composed in the time signature of common time, and follows a basic chord progression of F♯m–E/G♯–Dmaj7–C♯m7, and Gaga's vocals span from F♯_{3} to D♯_{5}.

Lyrically, "Perfect Illusion" delves on the "highest of highs and lowest of lows" encountered in a relationship which has turned sour, hence the song's name. Gaga described it during an interview with iHeartMedia as being "about modern ecstasy [...] We found our sweet, simple, ragey way of saying it. I get this sick adrenaline rush every time I hear it". The singer further clarified that the lyrics ultimately was a commentary on social media and the problems one face trying to present a perfect representation of themselves. Media reports speculated that the lyrics alluded to the singer's breakup from her boyfriend, actor Taylor Kinney, around July 2016. Samantha Schnurr from E! decoded the lyrics, saying that the repetition of the phrase "perfect illusion" was about their relationship. Gaga retorted during an interview with SiriusXM that the song was not for Kinney, and was not a "revenge" track. "I love Taylor so, so much and this song is not a hit out against him [...] It's a record about all of us. And I would never use my song or want to use the public to hurt anyone that I love so much," the singer added.

== Release and artwork ==
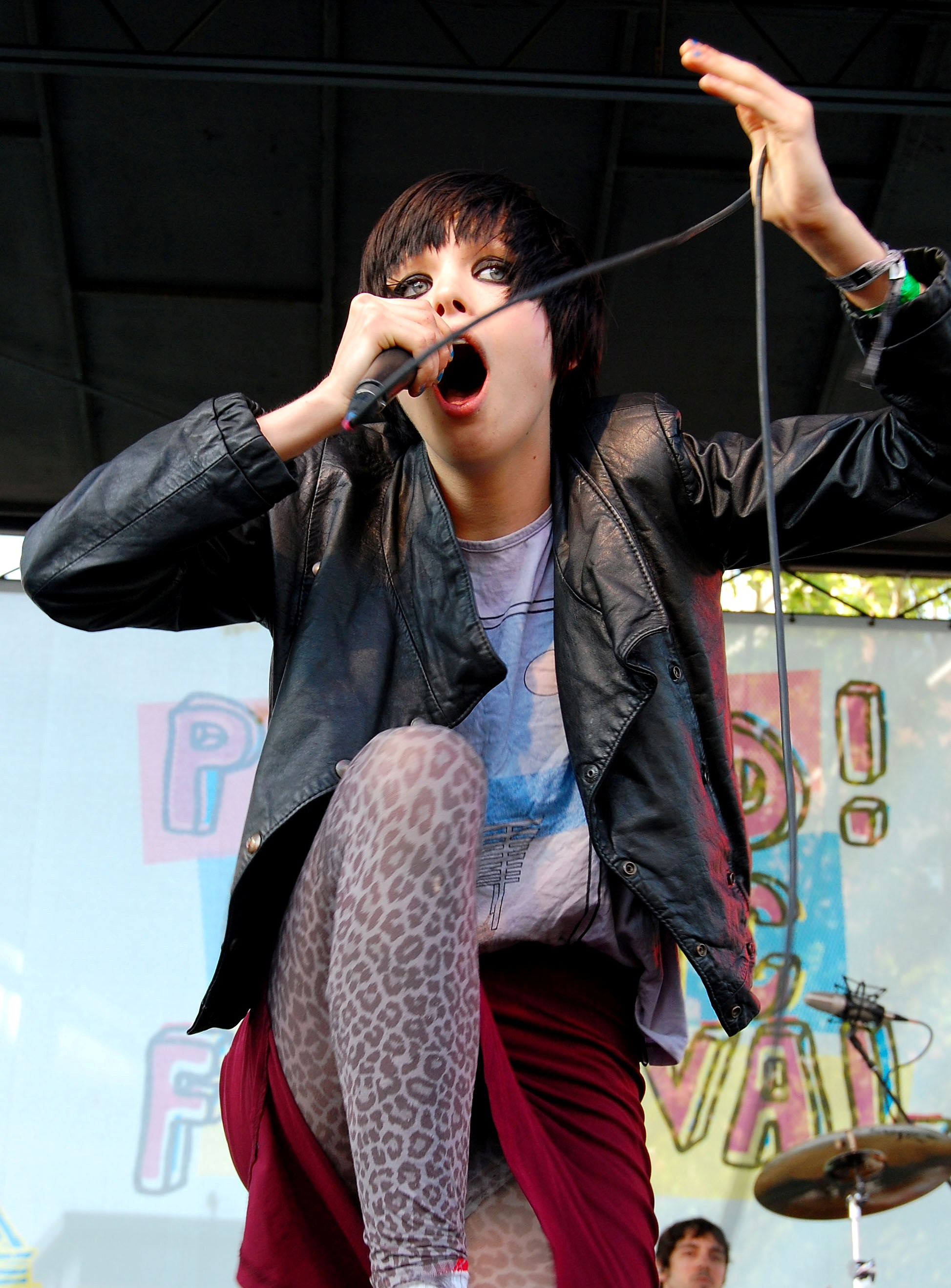
Gaga's look for the cover artwork was compared to that of singer Alice Glass (pictured).

In May 2016, Idolator reported that Gaga had been in recording studio with Ronson, along with BloodPop and Parker. Ronson later uploaded an image of the group working together on his Instagram account, captioning it as "illusion". Following her appearance at iHeartMedia, Gaga revealed the name of the single by uploading a series of twelve images on her Instagram account, creating a mosaic which spelt out the song's name. According to Sasha Atkinson from Bustle, the bright color scheme of the announcement was pop art like Andy Warhol and alluded to Artpop.

According to WKKF radio station in New York and KIIS 106.5 in Sydney, Australia, the single would be premiered on radio on September 9, 2016. The date was mistakenly revealed through the source code of Gaga's official website, which also listed the URL of four snippets of the track. Following this, Gaga confirmed the release date through her social media accounts. She also unveiled the single's artwork—showing Gaga on the side of a cliff singing into a microphone—along with lyrics of the song through a collage of images. Another photo was a shot from the music video, showing Gaga sitting on someone's shoulder and swerving her microphone over a crowd. The artwork was photographed by Ruth Hogben and Andrea Gelardin, according to V magazine. Writing for Paper, Carey O'Donnell called the cover "iconic", comparing Gaga to Canadian singer-songwriter Alice Glass and complimenting the metal and punk look. Sophie Atkinson from Bustle also complimented the image, which she found to be unusually "straightforward for [Gaga]" but was not a traditional beauty shot. Instead Atkinson described the artwork as "incredibly personal" which excited her for being different.

A 16-second video snippet was posted on Gaga's Twitter, showing Gaga dancing in a desert with strobe lights flashing around her, with the same chord beats being repeated. Gaga appeared on BBC Radio 1's Breakfast Show on September 9, 2016, alongside host Nick Grimshaw and premiered "Perfect Illusion" for the radio. The singer described the release as "overwhelming" and like a "rebirth" while adding that she had been "in the studio for months and months and now it's in the world [...] It feels like the first time. Something about this song, it feels like I'm a new artist." She also sang a few lines of the track.

== Critical reception ==
Upon release, "Perfect Illusion" received mixed to positive reviews from music critics. Alice Vincent of The Daily Telegraph gave the song four out of five stars, saying that it "delights me to write that this is a return to 'Just Dance'-era Gaga: a simple, infectiously catchy slice of floor-filling, stadium-cheering pop". She also complimented the "rich timbre" of Gaga's vocals on the song, and her emoting. For Jess Denham from The Independent, "Perfect Illusion" sounded more rock-oriented than "Just Dance" or "Poker Face"; she also complimented the vocals, compared the verses to work by singer Bruce Springsteen, and added that the track was "as catchy as they come and sure to prove a club banger".

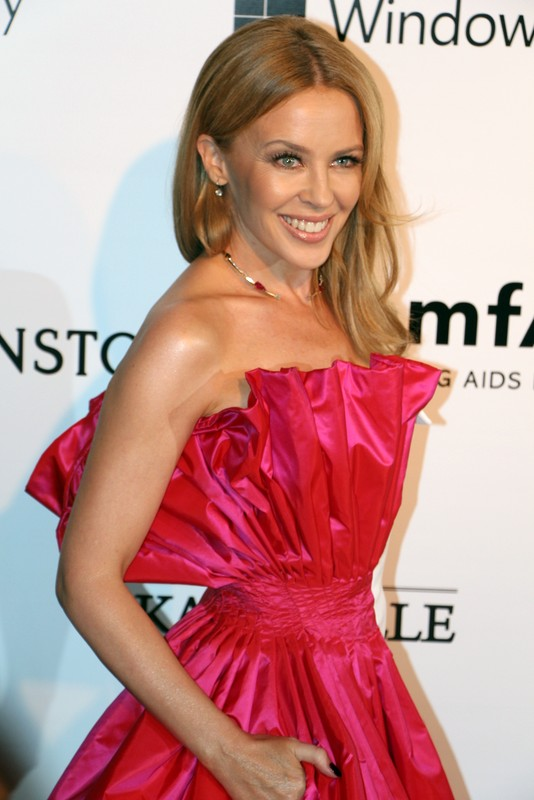
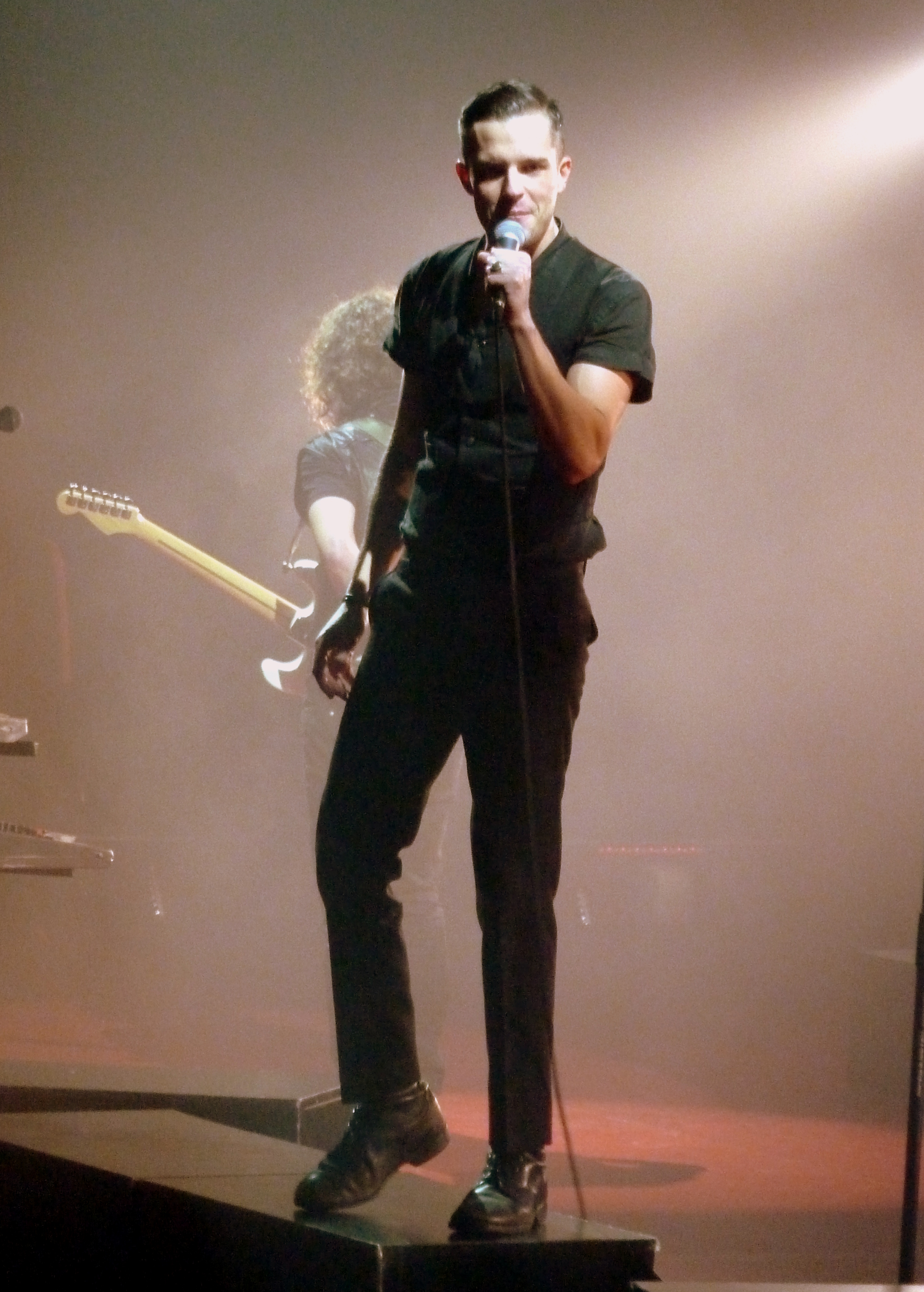
The New Zealand Herald described "Perfect Illusion" as a mixture of the music of Kylie Minogue and the Killers.

A writer for The New Zealand Herald called it a "storming pop-rock affair, with slightly less of the electro-pop sheen we've come to expect from her earlier work. Think Killers meets Kylie". Lewis Corner from Digital Spy wrote a detailed review of the track, describing its sound and associated imagery as "undressed". He also found echoes of Springsteen in the track, adding that the "disco-rock refrain pretty much blasts you at full volume from the 30-second point onward [...] It has a decent melody, and a surging, stadium-worthy build-up that echoes Bruce Springsteen." Jake Viswanath from V gave another positive review of the track, calling it a "true return to form". He felt it was an evolution from the singer's punk days showcasing her versatility. Viswanath also commended the song for keeping Gaga's voice in the forefront.

Writing for The Verge, Kaitlyn Tiffany compared the song to "Bad Romance" but with an "extra adrenaline shot of a big stadium rock song and some twinkly, vaguely creepy '80s synthesizers". In a positive review, Billboard heralded "Perfect Illusion" as Gaga's comeback release. Rhian Daly from NME praised the singer's vocals on the track and said "its booming disco influence and sheer force make it a formidable return [for Gaga]". Mikael Wood from the Los Angeles Times called the song "a stomping disco-rock jam with a killer robot-Motown groove, buckets of scuzz-punk guitar fuzz and a key change designed to trigger Pavlovian fist-pumps". In a review for The Daily Beast, Kevin Fallon was very impressed with Gaga's key change and complimented her vocals by describing it as "explosive and jagged, muddying up that tradition". Hugh McIntyre from Forbes claimed "the track manages to simultaneously take Gaga in a different direction, while still maintaining some of the qualities that have made her so popular". Spencer Kornhaber from The Atlantic noticed that Gaga was "blubbering like Bruce Springsteen" during the song's verse, but found it lacked irony in her delivery.

Other critics voiced more negative opinions of the track. Richard S. He of The Guardian heard "zero pitch correction on her vocal", and criticized this decision by adding that "Gaga wants you to hear the blue notes, the cracks in her voice. Unfortunately the cracks are all you hear." Spin referred to the single as a "swing and a miss". USA Today likened the track to Gaga's past work and said, "While not perfect, it's buoyant and fun enough, we suppose. Just not groundbreaking." Pitchfork's Jillian Mapes felt that "Perfect Illusion" did not live up to its significant anticipation, criticizing the song's production and Gaga's vocal performance. While ranking Lady Gaga's lead singles from worst to best, Billboard listed "Perfect Illusion" as second-worst, ahead of only "Applause" (2013). Rolling Stone ranked it number 28 on their Best Songs of 2016 list, stating, "Gaga fuses her neo-folkie Lilith-hippie mode with her disco roots in this Mark Ronson-produced dance-floor confession."

== Chart performance ==
In the United States, "Perfect Illusion" debuted at number 15 on the Billboard Hot 100, becoming her 23rd career Hot 100 entry. It also debuted at number two on the Digital Songs chart with sales of 100,000 digital downloads, and number 25 on the Streaming Songs chart with 8.3 million first-week streaming in the US. The song accumulated 22 million audience impression in its first week, which was not enough for it to enter the Radio Songs chart. On the other airplay charts of Billboard, "Perfect Illusion" debuted at number 31 on the Mainstream Top 40 and number 32 on the Adult Pop Songs charts, after it was played hourly on iHeartMedia-owned radio stations. It became Gaga's 16th entry on the former chart, released for the week ending September 24, 2016. "Perfect Illusion" ultimately peaked at numbers 17 and 22 on the Adult Pop Songs and Mainstream Top 40, respectively. The song also charted on Dance Club Songs, but stalled at number 13, becoming her third-lowest peaking single on the chart. In Canada, "Perfect Illusion" debuted and peaked at number 17 on the Canadian Hot 100. It was certified Gold by the Music Canada (MC) for selling over 40,000 units.

The song debuted at number 14 in Australia and number 31 in New Zealand, which became its peak in both regions. It was present for just three weeks on the former nation's chart, while in New Zealand it dropped off after its debut week. "Perfect Illusion" entered the UK Singles Chart at number twelve on the week of September 23, 2016. According to Music Week the song sold a total of 30,830 equivalent units, placing it at number four on the UK Singles Downloads Chart, and number 28 on the Official Audio Streaming Chart. It had sharp drops down the chart and was present in the top 100 for just six weeks. In France, the track debuted at number one on the French Singles Chart, before falling at number 94, becoming Gaga's biggest dropping in her career before "Million Reasons", who peaked at number 29 and fall at number 154 one month later. Other debuts atop the charts occurred in Finland and Greece, where the track entered the top of the digital charts. The song attained top-10 positions in Czech Republic, Hungary, Slovakia and Scotland, top twenty in Lebanon, Switzerland and Portugal, top thirty in Mexico and Austria and top forty in Germany, Japan, Spain and Sweden. It achieved a top five placement on the European Digital Songs chart published by Billboard. "Perfect Illusion" reached number five on the Italian Singles Chart and obtained a Gold certification from Federazione Industria Musicale Italiana (FIMI) for selling over 25,000 units.

== Music video ==
=== Production and synopsis ===
A music video for the song was directed by Ruth Hogben and Andrea Gelardin, who had also shot the cover artwork. Hogben and Gelardin has been associated for the past ten years with Gaga, working on different projects. Stylistically, collaborating on Joanne was a different experience for them. They were present in the recording studio with the singer and Ronson during conception of several tracks and the album's journey helped them understand Gaga's intent with the music. Since "Perfect Illusion" is an "energetic" track they wanted the video to reflect that. It was Gaga's idea to envision the clip as a performance, which became the starting point for Gelardin and Hogben. They wanted her to perform in between people instead on a stage, and asked Ronson, Parker and BloodPop to play cameos. While being interviewed by V magazine, the directors elaborated further:

"We wanted the video to show her without artifice, in a way that her videos may not have done in the past. There is a simplicity in the concept. For example, we love that she holds the handheld mic within the performance. The single cover was taken on the same day. We didn't want it to be a posed still or a "fashion image", we wanted it to show movement and energy and for it to be about her and her performance. Gaga drove the Bronco herself in the video and her commitment to the performance and her authentic raw energy really came across in the way she drove! For us, as directors, it was scary and exciting at the same time—the energy and emotion were purely authentic."

The world premiere occurred on September 20, 2016, during the season two premiere of Scream Queens on Fox. Gaga also shared a preview of the video, showing her swinging a microphone over her head as an ecstatic crowd cheers on. The visuals begin with her singing while driving a jeep through a desert and then finally performing in front of a crowd, aided by the producers. The video ends with Gaga rolling around alone in the desert. Jack White from the Official Charts Company noted that the editing consisted of "quick, jagged camera cuts" which made up majority of the visuals. In 2017, filming of the music video was included in the documentary film, Gaga: Five Foot Two.

=== Reception and analysis ===
Gaga performing in the desert throughout the music video of the song. The image illustrates Gaga's eye-rolling to the back of her head as noted by Spencer Kornhaber from The Atlantic, as well as the epilepsy-inducing editing pointed out by Lara Walsh from InStyle.

A writer for Billboard noted that Gaga waded and stomped through the desert while wearing tiny shorts and then appears in a party, and the ending signified the singer to be alone, "rolling in the desert". Jon Blistein from Rolling Stone described the visuals as "an eye-popping, strobe-lit bacchanal" with Gaga "[throwing] a frenetic desert rager in the euphoric new video". Joey Nolfi from Entertainment Weekly gave a positive review, saying that it consisted of "simple production design, emphasis on Gaga's unbridled choreography, and the noticeable absence of eccentric costumes and wigs" which made it a "radical departure" from Gaga's videography. He noticed that the video was heavy on "rock star energy" and did not have any particular narrative just focusing on "Gaga, the music, and the moves". Chelsea Stone from Teen Vogue complimented the dance nature of the clip and noted that Gaga had posted images from the video previously, as well as wore the same outfit from the video while announcing its premiere on Twitter. Bianca Gracie from Fuse commented that Gaga "exudes fearlessness while she kicks up dust, drives around in a jeep and throws a wild party" in the video. Carey O'Donnell from Paper felt that the video "enhanced" the song with a "sort of a 'Ohhhhh this is what we're doing' moment" and it pointed to an unplugged era for Gaga.

Sasha Geffen from MTV News noted Gaga's eyes rolling back in her head as she moshes with the crowd in the clip and "at one point she almost rips the head off of [Parker]". Similar thoughts were echoed in Lara Walsh's review of the clip for InStyle, where she fawned about being a "big fan" of Gaga's "raw appearance" in the video. Writing for the Idolator, Mike Wass noted that the cover artwork gives one a clear idea regarding what to expect from the video, seeing that it "reinvents Gaga as a rockstar" and the "epilepsy induced editing brings the whole thing to life". However he missed the theatricality associated with the singer's previous videos. Caitlyn Callegari from Bustle compared the clip with that of experiencing a Gaga concert from the front row and called it "appealing" since it had the singer's "patented stylistic melodrama while also maintaining an air of realness to it". Callegari complimented the visuals for bringing out Gaga as both a performer and singer, "and this video invites us to enjoy her in her purest form".

Spencer Kornhaber from The Atlantic had hoped that after the Cheek to Cheek era, Gaga would return to make her music video releases as events, like her previous albums, however he was disappointed that the video for "Perfect Illusion" was toned down. He felt the editing to be "excellently chaotic", and noted that Gaga's shots were filmed at a sped up rate than the others. Other observations included "something strange" with Gaga's eyes, which he theorized was either due to the makeup or her contact lenses "to make the whites bigger", or the directors wanted her to "roll her pupils back". He found Gaga's "fierce, hungry, and perhaps coked out" look fitted with the song's drug references. Kornhaber finished the review saying that the although the clip was "not a work of provocation", it still appeared a brave step since none of the singer's contemporaries would have attempted "something so raw and low-concept". HuffPost's Daniel Welsh felt disappointed watching "Perfect Illusion", since according to him Gaga has an "impressive track record when it comes to videos".

== Live performances and other uses ==
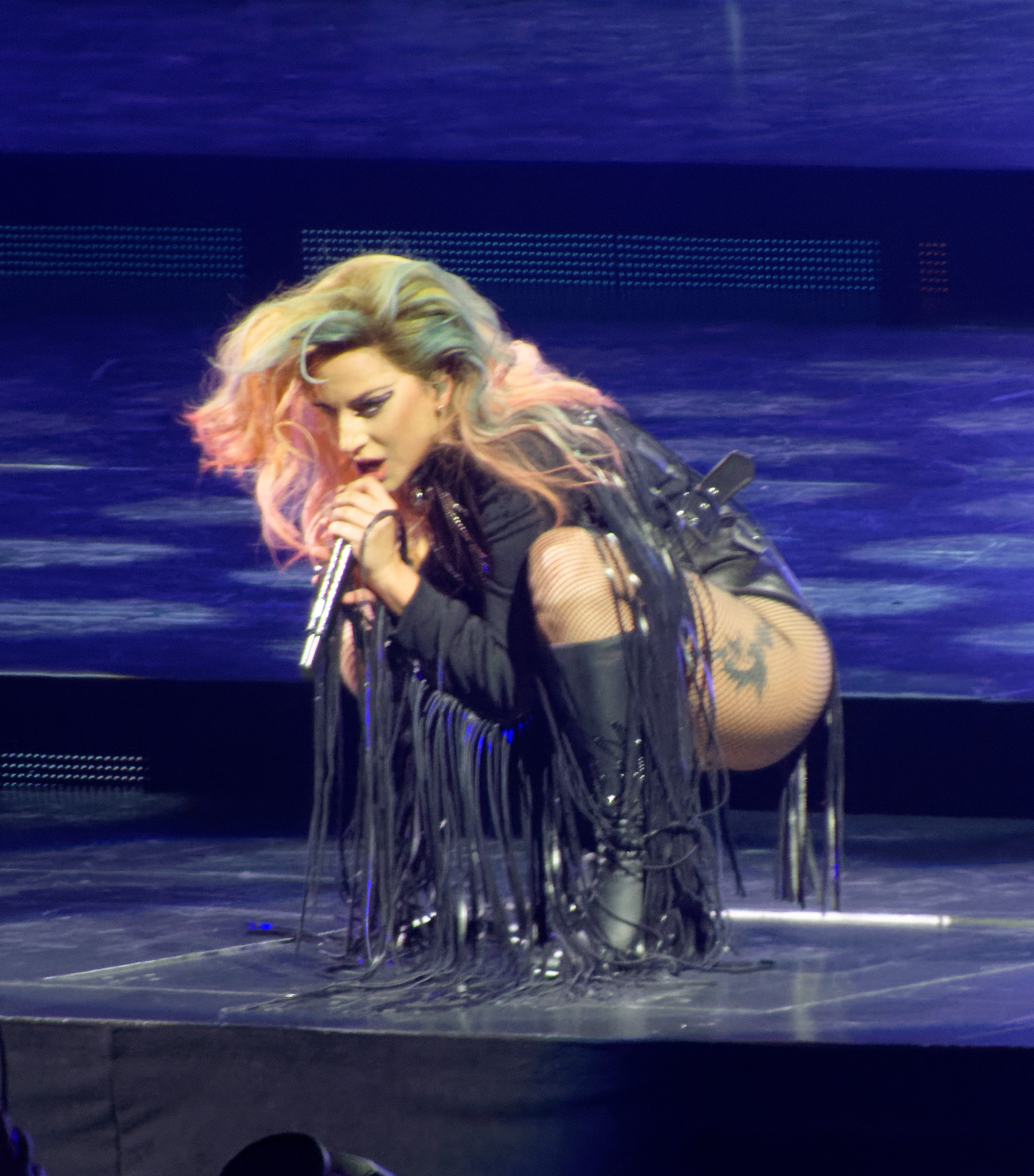
Gaga performing "Perfect Illusion" during the Joanne World Tour

"Perfect Illusion" was performed live for the first time at MOTH Club in London, on September 10, 2016. Gaga was wearing a crop top tee and silver shorts, alongside a microphone, which she twirled above her head while dancing. Daniel Kreps from Rolling Stone noted that Gaga sang "her energetic, driving dance-rock single with a head-banging performance that mirrored the single's cover art". Gaga also performed a stripped-down version of "Bad Romance" at the same venue following "Perfect Illusion". It was also performed on Gaga's three date long Dive Bar Tour where it was the closing song of the setlist on two occasions.

While promoting Joanne in Japan, Gaga performed a piano-only version of "Perfect Illusion" on morning television program Sukkiri!, and sang the song accompanied by the Japanese boy band SMAP on SMAP×SMAP. The performances were aired on November 1 and December 12, 2016, respectively. During the Carpool Karaoke segment of The Late Late Show with James Corden, "Perfect Illusion" was the first song Gaga sang in the vehicle. The track was also performed as part of the Joanne World Tour (2017–2018). Gaga wore an Alexander Wang-designed leather leotard for the performance, with heavy embroidery and long, leather fringe.

"Perfect Illusion" was featured in a trailer for the US horror series American Horror Story: Roanoke, speaking to the anonymity of the season, as the theme was kept a mystery until the premiere. Tame Impala included the song in the set list for the opening dates of The Slow Rush Tour in March 2020, performing it at shows in San Diego and Los Angeles.

== Credits and personnel ==
Credits adapted from the liner notes of Joanne.

=== Management ===
- Recorded at Shangri-La Studios (Malibu, California), Pink Duck Studios (Burbank, California and Electric Lady Studios (New York City, New York)
- Mixed at MixStar Studios (Virginia Beach, Virginia)
- Mastered at Sterling Sound (New York City, New York)
- Kiff's Bonza Songs/Sony/ATV Music Publishing Australia for Australia/New Zealand and Kiff's Bonza Songs/BMG Rights Management (UK) Limited for ROW ex-ANZ, Sony/ATV Songs LLC, House of Gaga Publishing (BMI), Imagem CV/Songs of Zelig (BMI) (Songs of Zelig administered worldwide by Imagem CV), OWSLA Music Publishing, LLC/Check Your Pulse, LLC (ASCAP)
- Kevin Parker appears courtesy of Modular Recordings Pty Ltd.

=== Personnel ===
- Lady Gaga – songwriting, vocals, production
- Mark Ronson – songwriting, guitar, synthesizer, production
- Kevin Parker – songwriting, production, drum, guitar, synthesizer, bass
- BloodPop – songwriting, production, guitar, synthesizer, rhythm track for GenPop Corp.
- Josh Homme – guitar
- Joshua Blair – recording
- David "Squirrel" Covell – recording assistant
- Justin Smith – recording assistant
- Barry McCready – recording assistant
- Serban Ghenea – mixing
- John Hanes – mixing engineering
- Tom Coyne – mastering
- Randy Merrill – mastering

== Charts ==
=== Weekly charts ===
Weekly chart performance for "Perfect Illusion"
Chart (2016)	Peak position
Australia (ARIA)	14
Austria (Ö3 Austria Top 40)	21
Belgium (Ultratop 50 Flanders)	43
Belgium (Ultratip Bubbling Under Wallonia)	1
Canada Hot 100 (Billboard)	17
Canada AC (Billboard)	15
Canada CHR/Top 40 (Billboard)	22
Canada Hot AC (Billboard)	21
Croatia International Airplay (Top lista)	4
Czech Republic Singles Digital (ČNS IFPI)	7
Euro Digital Songs (Billboard)	4
Finland Download (Latauslista)	1
France (SNEP)	1
Germany (GfK)	31
Greece Digital Songs (Billboard)	1
Hungary (Rádiós Top 40)	3
Hungary (Single Top 40)	3
Ireland (IRMA)	22
Italy (FIMI)	5
Japan Hot 100 (Billboard)	35
Lebanon (Lebanese Top 20)	15
Mexico (Billboard Ingles Airplay)	26
Netherlands (Dutch Top 40 Tipparade)	17
Netherlands (Single Top 100)	58
New Zealand (Recorded Music NZ)	31
Poland Airplay (ZPAV)	50
Portugal (AFP)	14
Russia Airplay (Tophit)	75
Scottish Singles Sales (Official Charts)	3
Slovakia Airplay (ČNS IFPI)	61
Slovakia Singles Digital (ČNS IFPI)	4
Slovenia (SloTop50)	41
Spain (Promusicae)	34
Sweden (Sverigetopplistan)	38
Switzerland (Schweizer Hitparade)	16
UK Singles (Official Charts)	12
US Billboard Hot 100	15
US Adult Contemporary (Billboard)	25
US Adult Pop Airplay (Billboard)	17
US Dance Club Songs (Billboard)	13
US Dance Airplay (Billboard)	28
US Pop Airplay (Billboard)	22
Venezuela English (Record Report)	27

=== Year-end charts ===
2016 year-end chart performance for "Perfect Illusion"
Chart (2016)	Position
Hungary (MAHASZ)	62

== Certifications ==
Certifications for "Perfect Illusion"
Region	Certification	Certified units/sales
Australia (ARIA)	Platinum	70,000^{‡}
Brazil (Pro-Música Brasil)	2× Platinum	120,000^{‡}
Canada (Music Canada)	Gold	40,000^{‡}
Italy (FIMI)	Gold	25,000^{‡}
New Zealand (RMNZ)	Gold	15,000^{‡}
United Kingdom (BPI)	Silver	200,000^{‡}
United States (RIAA)	Gold	500,000^{‡}
^{‡} Sales+streaming figures based on certification alone.

== Release history ==
Release dates and formats for "Perfect Illusion"
Region	Date	Format(s)	Label	Ref.
Various	September 9, 2016	Digital download; streaming	Interscope	
Italy	September 9, 2016	Radio airplay	Universal	
United States	September 12, 2016	Adult contemporary radio; hot adult contemporary radio; modern adult contemporary radio	Interscope	
United States	September 13, 2016	Contemporary hit radio	Interscope	

== See also ==
- List of number-one singles of 2016 (Finland)
- List of number-one hits of 2016 (France)
