= You Put the Beat in My Heart =

Single by Eddie Rabbitt

from the album Greatest Hits Vol. II
- B-side: "Our Love Will Survive"
- Released: September 3, 1983
- Genre: Country
- Length: 4:47
- Label: Warner Bros. Nashville
- Songwriters: Don Pfrimmer; Rick Giles
- Producers: Snuff Garrett; David Malloy

Eddie Rabbitt singles chronology
"You Can't Run from Love" (1983)	"You Put the Beat in My Heart" (1983)	"Nothing Like Falling in Love" (1983)

"You Put the Beat in My Heart" is a song written by Don Pfrimmer and Rick Giles, and recorded by American country music artist Eddie Rabbitt. It was released in September 1983 as the first single from his Greatest Hits Vol. II compilation album. The song reached number 10 on the Billboard Hot Country Singles & Tracks chart.

== Chart performance ==
Chart (1983)	Peak position
US Hot Country Songs (Billboard)	10
US Billboard Hot 100	81
US Adult Contemporary (Billboard)	15
Canada Country Singles (RPM)	5
Canada Adult Contemporary (RPM)	30
