= Radio Romance (Eddie Rabbitt album) =

Studio album by Eddie Rabbitt
- Released: October 1982
- Recorded: 1982
- Studios: Sound Stage Studios, The Music Mill, The Garage Studio, The Sound Lab and Emerald Sound Studios (Nashville, Tennessee)
- Genre: Country
- Length: 34:46
- Labels: Elektra (original label); Liberty
- Producer: David Malloy

Eddie Rabbitt chronology
Step by Step (1981)	Radio Romance (1982)	Greatest Hits Vol. II (1983)

Singles from Radio Romance
- 1. "You and I" Released: October 1982; 2. "You Can't Run from Love" Released: March 1983

Radio Romance is the eighth studio album by American country music artist Eddie Rabbitt, released in 1982.

== Background ==
The album spawned three singles in total. "You and I" was the lead single, a duet with Crystal Gayle, written by Frank J. Myers. It was a major country pop crossover hit for both artists, topping the US and Canadian Country Songs chart, and peaking at No. 7 on the American Billboard Hot 100 chart, as well as No. 2 on the Billboard Adult Contemporary chart. The second single "You Can't Run from Love" also topped the US and Canadian Country Songs chart, while peaking at #55 on the Billboard Hot 100 chart, as well as No. 2 on the Billboard Adult Contemporary chart. The final single was "Our Love Will Survive", released in 1983, including the B-Side "You Put the Beat in my Heart" from Rabbitt's Greatest Hits Volume II compilation. It was not a commercial success. The Radio Romance album reached No. 5 on the American Top Country Albums chart, as well as No. 31 on the Billboard 200.

The song "Years After You" was written by Thom Schuyler, and would later be recorded by American country music artist John Conlee in 1984, who reached No. 2 on both the American and Canadian Country Songs charts. "Good Night for Falling in Love" would later be covered in 1984 by Hillary Kanter, who released it as a single which peaked at No. 51 on the Country Singles chart in America.

== Recording ==
In 1982, Rabbitt began a new tour in Chicago, and soon after he returned to Nashville and the recording studio for a few days. While performing for a week at the MGM Grand in Las Vegas, he would work on mixing the Radio Romance album during the daytime while doing two shows a night. The album was not as ready as Rabbitt demanded. It was first scheduled for release in August but was pushed back until September. The album's mixing was handled at Nashville's Emerald Sound Studio. It was opened by Stevens and Malloy who worked alongside Rabbitt on many albums including Radio Romance. The album was the first project within the newly opened studio. Initially the studio was not finished at the time the mixing of the album was due to start in October 1982. Malloy decided to have all the equipment temporarily moved into the studio in order to finish the project.

== Release ==
The album was originally released on vinyl LP, cassette and eight-track tape in America and Canada via Elektra. The artwork featured a photograph of Rabbitt displayed next to a radio, which had a woman's hand covering it. Later Capitol Records released the album on CD for the first time in 1990, however this is now out-of-print. This release featured new artwork, featuring a close-up photograph of Rabbitt. In 2008 the album was issued as an MP3 download. In 1983, Elektra issued a music-sheet book covering all tracks on the album.

== Critical reception ==
Professional ratings
Review scores
Source	Rating
AllMusic	3.5/5 stars
The Philadelphia Inquirer	2/5 stars

From contemporary reviews, Mark S. Wisnjewski of the Reading Eagle observed that "as a songwriter/performer, Rabbitt has nicely mastered the 'hook.'" He added that "at least eight of the 10 tunes on his new LP sound like 45 releases—they are that commercially 'catchy.'" Singling out "You Can't Run from Love" and "You Got Me Now" as potential single hits, Wisniewski further stated that "perhaps the most amazing 'slight-of-ear' on Radio Romance is Rabbitt's ability to take his major weakness and disguise it as a strength. Strip away the multiple-tracking, the echo and the harmonizing female voices, and one discovers Rabbitt has a surprisingly nondescript limited vocal range." Ken Tucker of The Philadelphia Inquirer gave the album a two star out of five rating. He opined:

Rabbitt's smiling-stud persona gets more offensive with every album. What can you do with a guy whose melodies melt country into early rock 'n' roll with smooth skill, yet chooses to cover songs in which he sounds obnoxiously self-righteous?

Peter Reilly of Stereo Review commented that "[Rabbitt is] good with something like 'Bedroom Eyes', but even there he seems at times to be counting flowers on the wall rather than concentrating on the supposed object of his desire."

== Track listing ==
No.	Title	Writer(s)	Length
1.	"You Can't Run from Love"	Eddie Rabbitt, David Malloy, Even Stevens	3:42
2.	"Years After You"	Thom Schuyler	3:27
3.	"Good Night for Falling in Love"	Rabbitt, Malloy, Stevens	3:09
4.	"You and I" (duet with Crystal Gayle)	Frank J. Myers	4:00
5.	"You Got Me Now"	Stevens, Rabbitt, Malloy	3:53
6.	"Our Love Will Survive"	Stevens, Malloy, Rabbitt, Randy McCormick	3:28
7.	"Stranger in Your Eyes"	Rabbitt, Stevens, Malloy	3:55
8.	"Bedroom Eyes"	Rabbitt, Stevens, Malloy, Stephen Allen Davis	3:37
9.	"Laughing on the Outside"	Rabbitt, Malloy, Stevens	3:27
10.	"All My Life, All My Love"	Billy Joe Walker Jr., Malloy, Rabbitt, Stevens	2:42

== Personnel ==
- Eddie Rabbitt – lead vocals, harmony vocals, acoustic guitars
- Shane Keister – synthesizers
- Randy McCormick – keyboards, synth strings
- Larry Byrom – lead guitars
- Billy Joe Walker Jr. – lead guitars
- Anthony Crawford – steel guitar
- Joe Chemay – bass
- David Hungate – bass
- James Stroud – drums, percussion
- Larry Cansler – string arrangements
- Denny Henson – backing vocals (2)
- David Malloy – backing vocals (2)
- Rick Palombi – backing vocals (2)
- Crystal Gayle – harmony vocals (4)

=== Production ===
- David Malloy – producer
- Joseph Bogan – engineer, remixing
- Chuck Ainlay – engineer
- Jim Cotton – engineer
- Peter Granet – engineer
- Brent King – engineer
- Rocky Schnaars – engineer
- Russ Martin – remix assistant
- Glenn Meadows – mastering at Masterfonics (Nashville, Tennessee)
- John Farris – production coordinator
- John Coulter – art direction
- Tina Robinson – cover concept
- Steven Chorney – airbrush
- Michael Manoogian – logos
- Lynn Goldsmith – photography
- Ken Li Chung – photography

== Charts ==
=== Album ===
Chart (1982)	Peak position
U.S. Billboard Top Country Albums	5
U.S. Billboard 200	31

=== Singles ===
Year	Single	Peak chart positions					
Year	Single	US Country	US	US AC	CAN Country	CAN	CAN AC
1982	"You and I" (with Crystal Gayle)	1	7	2	1	35	1
1983	"You Can't Run from Love"	1	55	2	1	—	4
