= You and I (Lady Gaga song) =

2011 single by Lady Gaga

Single by Lady Gaga

from the album Born This Way
- Released: August 23, 2011
- Recorded: 2010
- Studio: Warehouse Productions (Omaha, Nebraska); Allerton Hill (United Kingdom)
- Genre: Country rock; arena rock
- Length: 5:07
- Label: Streamline; KonLive; Interscope
- Songwriter: Lady Gaga
- Producers: Lady Gaga; Robert John "Mutt" Lange

Lady Gaga singles chronology
"3-Way (The Golden Rule)" (2011)	"You and I" (2011)	"The Lady Is a Tramp" (2011)

Music video
- "You And I" on YouTube

"You and I" (stylized as "Yoü and I") is a song written and recorded by American singer-songwriter Lady Gaga, taken from her second studio album, Born This Way (2011). She also co-produced it with Robert John "Mutt" Lange. The track samples Queen's "We Will Rock You" (1977) and features electric guitar by Queen's Brian May. Gaga debuted "You and I" in June 2010 during her performance at Elton John's White Tie and Tiara Ball. Footage of the performance appeared on the Internet, and the positive response encouraged her to include the song on her setlist for The Monster Ball Tour. She later performed the song on Today to a record crowd in July 2010, and on The Oprah Winfrey Show in May 2011. On August 23, 2011, Interscope Records released the song as the fourth single from the album.

"You and I" is a downtempo song featuring instrumentation from electric guitars and piano, with Gaga and Lange providing background vocals. The song received critical acclaim, with reviewers listing it as one of the highlights from Born This Way. Commercially, "You and I" reached the top ten in Austria, Belgium, Canada, Israel, Japan, Lebanon, New Zealand, and the United States. The song was also certified multi-platinum in Australia, Brazil, and the United States. Season ten American Idol contestant Haley Reinhart performed "You and I" in May 2011 before its release, earning positive reviews. Her studio recording was released to the iTunes Store as a single, and appeared on the compilation album, American Idol Top 5 Season 10. "You and I" was nominated for the Grammy Award for Best Pop Solo Performance at the 54th Grammy Awards, which was held on February 12, 2012.

The accompanying music video for "You and I" was also met with a positive response. Gaga's long-time collaborator Laurieann Gibson shot it in Springfield, Nebraska, and it was released on August 16, 2011. The video features Yüyi, Gaga's mermaid alter ego, and Jo Calderone, Gaga's male alter ego, who also appears on the single's cover. Gaga later performed "You and I" dressed as Jo Calderone at the 2011 MTV Video Music Awards. The song has subsequently been performed on the singer's concert tours and residencies.

== Background and release ==
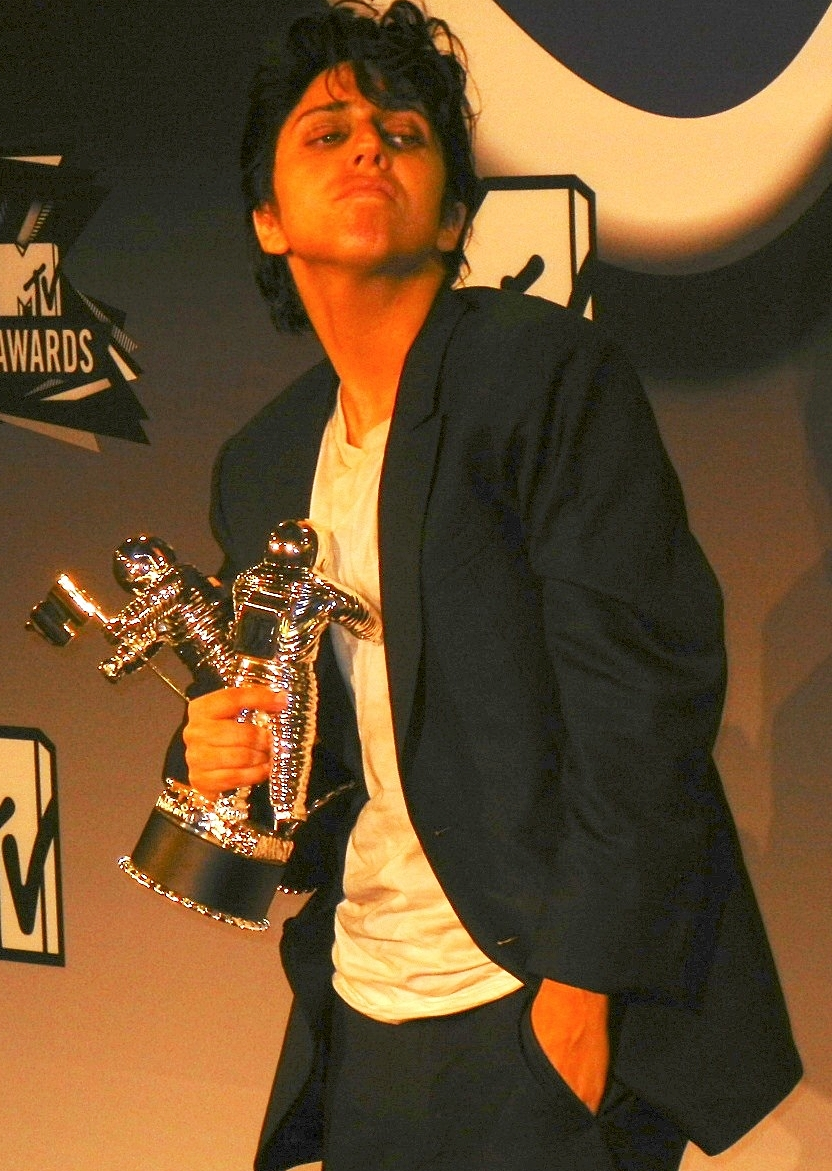
Lady Gaga, as her alter ego Jo Calderone, at the 2011 MTV Video Music Awards

"You and I", written by Lady Gaga and produced by Gaga and Robert John "Mutt" Lange, was one of the first songs previewed from the album. Gaga said she wrote the song in New York City, while she was busy playing her old piano. The singer first played "You and I" at Elton John's White Tie and Tiara Ball in June 2010. She said that the song was a bit of a "rock-and-roll tune" and, as such, was unlikely to be released as a single from Born This Way. She said that it "is very dear" to her heart. Footage of the performance appeared on the Internet soon after, and positive response encouraged Lady Gaga to perform the song during the first concert of the North American leg of The Monster Ball Tour in Montreal. Gaga told MSNBC's Meredith Vieira and Ann Curry that "'You and I' was written about the most important person that I ever met", allegedly Lüc Carl, her ex-boyfriend.

Gaga announced "You and I" as the fourth single from Born This Way on July 22, 2011. Its cover, released on August 5, 2011, via TwitPic, was accompanied by the line: "You will never find what you are looking for in love, if you don't love yourself." It features two black-and-white images of Gaga's male alter ego Jo Calderone smoking a cigarette and sporting sideburns. The Calderone character made a previous appearance in June 2011, when Gaga posed as him in London for a series of photos by photographer Nick Knight, arranged by stylist Nicola Formichetti. One shot features him wearing a blazer and white T-shirt with his head down smoking a cigarette. The other image is of Jo Calderone in silhouette exhaling a cloud of smoke.

A writer for Australia's The Daily Telegraph described the images as having a moody and scruffy look, and felt that Gaga had become "bored with being an outrageous woman and has decided to switch gender instead." Rap-Up's David Jones commented that Gaga's Calderone character appearing on the cover looked similar to musician Bob Dylan. Steve Pond of Reuters stated about the artwork: "Lady Gaga loves herself even when she's dressed as a guy."

== Composition ==
"You and I"
A sample of "You and I", where Gaga sings the bridge, which includes the lines "Sit back down on the couch where we made love the first time, and you said to me", a reference to the couch on which she had sex with her boyfriend, Lüc Carl.

"You and I" was written solely by Gaga. The song has rock, arena rock, and country music influences, and features British rock band Queen's guitarist Brian May. It was recorded by Tom Ware and Horace Ward at the Warehouse Productions Studio in Omaha, Nebraska, and Allerton Hill in the United Kingdom, respectively. Along with May, Justin Shirley Smith also played guitars; Gene Grimaldi mastered the track. Olle Romo did additional recording and programming. Gaga teased that "someone legendary" would be producing the track before production credits were announced in April 2011. Gaga, a Queen fan (even taking her stage name from the Queen song "Radio Ga Ga"), admitted to "[falling] to the floor crying and laughing" when she found out that May agreed to the collaboration. Lange asked Gaga to record a "rough lead vocal" for the track while she was touring. Gaga later recalled: "I had about 30 cigarettes and a couple of glasses of Jameson and just put on a click track and sang my face off, thinking we'd redo the vocals." However, Lange was satisfied with her recording and used it on the track. Ware recalled that the song was recorded the night after Gaga's March 17, 2011, concert for The Monster Ball Tour. She welcomed his opinions and encouraged his input which he said helped make the four-hour session the best working experience he has had with a celebrity. "She was flattering toward the studio — and Omaha, too, for that matter. She is a bright young lady with remarkable music instincts who charts her own path," he added.

According to the sheet music published by Sony/ATV Music Publishing, "You and I" is set in common time with a slow tempo of 60 beats per minute. It is written in the key of A major. During the song Gaga's voice spans from the notes of E_{3} to C♯_{5}. The song begins with an A–G–A chord progression, which changes to A–Bm/A–D/A–B♯m during the chorus, and back to the former chords afterwards. The opening lyrics—"It's been a long time since I came around/ It's been a long time, but I'm back in town/ And this time, I'm not leaving without you"—describe a whiskey-breathed lover for whom she is pining. Gil Kaufman of MTV News described it as the "tune eschewed most of her dance flavor, right down to a rollicking barrel-house piano solo." Her voice sounded like growling during the main verses, where she sings the lines: "He said, 'Sit back down where you belong, in the corner of my bar with your high heels on, Sit back down on the couch where we made love the first time..."

Noting the differences between live performances of the song and the studio version, Neil McCormick of The Daily Telegraph observed that the piano parts were replaced mostly by "fizzing synths, a stomping beat sampled from "We Will Rock You", thundering electric guitars and backing vocals stacked into shimmering choral walls." Kitty Empire of The Guardian described the song as an "umlaut-toting digital country power ballad" with two Bruce Springsteen references: "born to run" and Nebraska.

== Critical reception ==
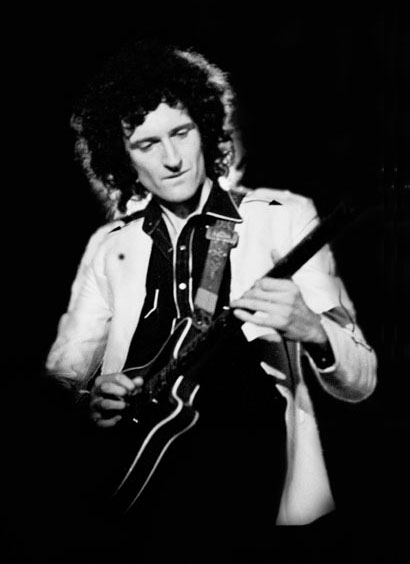
Brian May, guitarist for rock band Queen, played guitars on "You and I".

"You and I" received acclaim from music critics. After hearing the White Tie and Tiara Ball performance, Entertainment Weekly's Leah Greenblatt complimented the song for its "torchy, slow-burn cabaret quality" and for lacking "Auto-Tune, fancy production, or performance gimmicks." McCormick, noting the differences between Gaga's live and studio versions of the song, described the studio version as "bigger, bolder and less quirkily emotive, a custom-built radio rock ballad to induce hand claps in packed stadiums. This is not music for the underground: it is cheesy, high-gloss, pop rock for the mainstream middle, a kind of instant Eighties retro classic to seduce middle-aged rockers – possibly the last demographic to remain sceptical about her appeal." Jody Rosen of Rolling Stone called the song a confessional power ballad "with a torrid, Sturm und Drang vocal turn". In his review for The Guardian, Tim Jonze said the song "aims for a 'Hey Jude' style singalong but – owing to its determination to have someone playing kitchen sink in the background – ends up as bloated as Oasis' 'All Around the World'." Kitty Empire said the song is Gaga's "unlikely heartland moment – a bid, perhaps, to locate herself as an all-American balladeer as well as an art-disco avatar with tent pegs under her skin", referring to the prosthetics featured in the music video for the song "Born This Way".

The Dartmouth's Kate Sullivan wrote that "You and I" may be Gaga's most honest song to date. Shirley Halperin of The Hollywood Reporter wondered whether pop radio would play the song, considering Gaga's popularity. Halperin felt that the track emoted "a sense of grandness that listeners don't always get with Gaga's RedOne-produced heavily synthetic sounds." Conversely, she felt that the live piano and background vocals by Gaga and Lange added "an undeniably lush quality, while the lyrics drives the song home and potentially into hit territory." Kerri Mason of Billboard felt that the "country ballad" made no contextual sense. Nekesa Mumbi Moody, while reviewing Born This Way for Florida Today, compared the song to "Speechless", a similar tempo song included on The Fame Monster (2009). Robert Copsey, a writer for the website Digital Spy gave the song four out of five stars calling it a "torchy, retro-classic, all-American power ballad custom-built for the masses – and one we suspect Stefani would be proud to call her own." Amy Sciarretto of Artistdirect concluded that the song was "a bit bluesier than anything you'd expect from the dance floor icon." AllMusic's Stephen Thomas Erlewine chose the song as a highlight on Born This Way saying that Gaga shows her vulnerability in it.

In October 2026, Rolling Stone ranked "You and I" at number 82 on its list of the 200 greatest rock songs of the 21st century so far. J. Blistein praised the song's embrace of arena rock conventions and described it as a song about reuniting with an unforgettable ex. "You and I" was nominated for Best Pop Solo Performance at the 54th Annual Grammy Awards, which was held on February 12, 2012.

== Chart performance ==
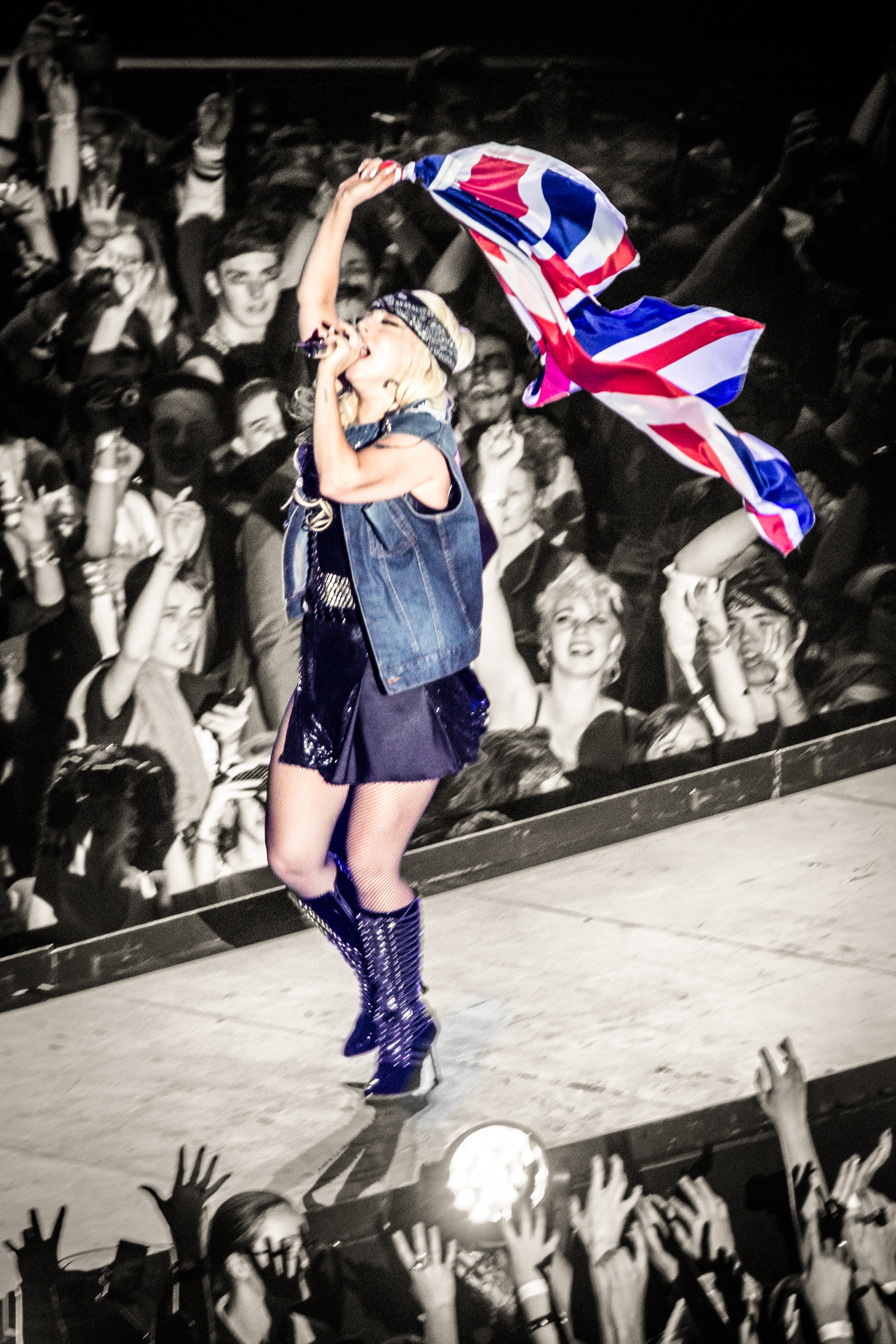
Lady Gaga performing "You and I" in Manchester on the Born This Way Ball tour

In the United States, "You and I" debuted on the Billboard Hot 100 at number 36 on the June 11, 2011 chart, having sold 83,000 downloads. The song re-entered the August 27, 2011, Billboard Hot 100 at number 96, while debuting on the Pop Songs chart at number 35. The following week, the song was the greatest gainer on the digital chart, entering at number 24 having sold 56,000 copies, while moving to number 35 on the Hot 100. It also gained airplay and became the highest debuting song on the Radio Songs chart, entering at number 58 with 22 million audience impressions. Following her performance on the MTV Video Music Awards, "You and I" moved up to number 16 on the Hot 100, with a 92% increase in digital sales to 109,000 and a 50% increase in airplay to 32 million, according to Nielsen Broadcast Data Systems. The following week, it moved to number six on the Hot 100 with a 61% increase in digital sales to 175,000 and a 32% increase in radio play to 41 million audience impressions, reaching number four and number 23 on the Digital Songs and Radio Songs charts, respectively. "You and I" became Gaga's eleventh consecutive top ten single on the Hot 100. In October 2011 it became Gaga's tenth song to sell 1 million in the U.S. As of February 2018, "You and I" has sold 2.4 million digital downloads in the US becoming Gaga's tenth two-million seller. In February 2016, "You and I" received a triple platinum certification from the Recording Industry Association of America.

In Canada, the song entered the Hot Digital Songs chart at number 14, subsequently debuting on the Canadian Hot 100 at number 27. It entered the charts again at number 45, and has reached a peak of number 10. Before the single was officially released in Australia, digital downloads were sold, consequently it entered the ARIA Singles Chart at number 56 on August 15, 2011. The following week, the song moved up to number 34, and has reached a peak of number 14. Following the album's release on May 23, 2011, "You and I" entered the UK Singles Chart at number 89, thanks to digital downloads from Born This Way. The song jumped up to number 70 from its previous week's position of number 187, in the issue dated September 3, 2011, and has reached a peak of number 23. In Japan, the song had initially entered the digital chart at number 98, but after the MTV Video Music Awards performance, it entered the Japan Hot 100 at number eight.

In Europe in Asia, the song was a moderate success, peaking however the top ten in Austria and Japan, top twenty in Italy, Slovakia, Lebanon and Iceland, top thirty in Germany, Hungary and Czech Republic and top forty in Ireland and Switzerland. It failed nevertheless to enter in some European markets, like in France, where the song debuted at number 98 and stayed two weeks, becoming Gaga's lowest enter in the country until "Artpop" in 2013, who debuted at number 185 and as a single until "A-Yo", who debuted at number 167 and stayed 2 weeks. It also failed to enter in the top eighty in the Netherlands, where "You & I" debuted at number 83 and became Gaga's lowest debut in the country since.

== Music video ==
=== Background ===
"It was so sweet, and I looked out and it's so beautiful, that tall corn... Then all of a sudden you start to see these monsters pop up. I love this place [Nebraska] so much, and it really comes from a genuine place. The person who I wrote this song about has been my buddy and my best friend since I was 19 years old, and he's from here."

— Gaga talking about her love for Nebraska, and the shooting of the video.

"You and I"'s music video was filmed in Springfield, Nebraska in July 2011, and was directed by Lady Gaga's then choreographer Laurieann Gibson. In the video, Gaga walks from New York City to Nebraska to get her boyfriend back. According to Gaga: "I'm walking with no luggage and no nothing and it's just me and my ankles are bleeding a little bit and there's grass stuck in my shoes and I've got this outfit on and it's real sort of New York clothing and I'm sprinting... And the [video is about the] idea that when you're away from someone you love, it's torture," she continued. "I knew I wanted the video to be about me sprinting back and walking hundreds of thousands of miles to get him back."

She announced that the video would be the 1,000th tweet on her Twitter account. Gaga confirmed to MTV News that the video would premiere on August 18, 2011, on MTV. However, two days before it was to air, parts of the clip leaked on the Internet, prompting Gaga to post three tweets which, together, read "FUCK THURS DAY". The messages were followed immediately by her 1,000th Twitter message: "You must love all + every part of me, as must I, for this complex + incomprehensible force to be true," including a link to the full music video, uploaded to Gaga's YouTube channel two days earlier than its scheduled première. The video features Gaga's two alter egos: Jo Calderone, Gaga's male ego, and Yüyi, a mermaid she had hinted would appear in the video in July 2011.

Following the video's premiere on MTV, Gaga explained some of its scenes and her inspiration: "The video is quite complex in the way that the story is told, and it's meant to be slightly linear and slightly twisted and confusing, which is the way that love is." Regarding the sexual intercourse scenes between actor Taylor Kinney and the singer as a mermaid, Gaga explained that it emphasized metaphorically that sometimes relationships did not work. "No matter what you do, there's this giant boundary between you and someone else. So that's what it's about, perceiving in your imagination that there's something magical inside of you that you can make it work," she said. After revealing that the wedding dress shown in the video belonged to her mother, Gaga explained the scenes involving the ice cream truck. According to her, they represented the destruction of her youth, experiences she had shared in earlier interviews. Explaining her decision to include them, Gaga said:

That's how I wanted to open the video, because I think it really sets up the rest of the story. It allows you to imagine you yourself are not just one person; you're so many. That person has so many stories and memories to draw from, and they all affect your journey profusely. I'm battered quite brutally at the beginning of the video, but at the end, I'm not battered; I'm a bit strange. It's not meant to be an answer video; it's meant to be a profuse number of the question.

=== Synopsis ===
The music video begins with Gaga, dressed in black clothing, sunglasses, bloody feet, and seemingly bionic features, walking through a field in Nebraska; having returned on foot after years of absence. Gaga goes to buy ice cream from an ice cream truck, but she suddenly drops it as a toothless man with a doll in his hand grins at her. She begins to have flashbacks to an earlier time spent in Nebraska as scenes of Gaga having a wedding, being tortured by a man inside a barn, and being inside a water tank appear in quick succession. The song starts playing as the camera zooms slowly towards Gaga, who is standing bent forward as she begins singing. The video continually switches to scenes where Gaga, with little make up, a simple gray-colored hair style, and a white dress, plays a piano in the middle of a cornfield, while her male alter ego, Jo Calderone, sits on top of the piano, smoking and drinking a beer. As Calderone pulls up his sleeves, present day Gaga is still walking through the desert.

Lady Gaga as Yüyi the Mermaid in the music video

During the second verse, a mad scientist, portrayed by Kinney, seemingly tortures Gaga, who is wearing a yellow dress with glasses made of barbwire, as another version of the singer, with teal-colored hair, performs a dance routine with her backup dancers in a barn. As the chorus begins for the second time, Gaga appears as Yüyi the Mermaid, with gills on her face and neck, as she lies in a tub filled with dirty water. At the end of the chorus, the camera zooms to a brunette Gaga inside a water tank while she sings "You and I" in the desert scene, and in the cornfield with Calderone. Interspersing scenes again show Gaga having her wedding, Yüyi in her tub, and Gaga seated on a chair with a conveyor belt. During May's guitar solo, Gaga dances in the cornfield with other dancers dressed in the same white dress, as Yüyi and the scientist kiss. While singing the chorus for the final time, Gaga kisses Calderone in one sequence and runs across the field in another. As the video reaches its conclusion, the tortured Gaga is being slid down as the conveyor belt turns on. The video ends with Yüyi and the scientist together in the bath tub, as a depiction of their dream wedding flashes across, before a last shot of the barn as the screen turns black.

=== Reception ===
Following its premature release on the Web, the music video for "You and I" met with positive reviews. Matthew Perpetua of Rolling Stone felt the video was an improvement over her earlier videos, "Judas" and "The Edge of Glory", saying, "the best moments of the video put a distinctly Gaga-ish spin on the iconography of Americana and traditional love stories." Jillian Mapes of Billboard wrote the video has: "torture contraptions, mermaid sex, a wedding, bondage in a barn, an ice cream truck, and to top it all off, 'Children of the Corn' and religious overtones thrown in for good measure," and thought the video setting was the strangest representation of Nebraska. Leah Collins of Dose felt the video was a "great opportunity for the singer to finally find out what it's like to make out with herself." Kyle Anderson of Entertainment Weekly noted of the scene in which Gaga plays a piano in a cornfield beside her male alter ego: "She's just Stefani Joanne Angelina Germanotta, playing a piano in the middle of a corn field—with a little making out on the side, of course." Gil Kaufman of MTV News believed that Gaga was not joking when she talked about the video being about the "torture" of being away from the one you love. "And, man, based on the bruising final product, she wasn't kidding," Kaufman concluded.

Jocelyn Vena of MTV found influences of Gaga's past videos in the various avatars she plays in "You and I". She explained that:

when [Gaga] stands at a crossroads in a big hat, the image is reminiscent of 'Telephone' Gaga. When she sits nearly makeup-free at her piano in the cornfields, there are touches of the teary-eyed makeup-less Gaga from the 'Bad Romance' video. Flashes of her wedding may remind fans of the wedding dress she wore in the 'Judas' clip. Robot Gaga's facial structures recall some of the steampunk looks of her 'Alejandro' video. Those are only a few of the nods to past personae from her own videography.

Devin Brown of CBS News felt that Gaga had finally returned to form with the video. "After some visually pleasing but generally lackluster videos, she has finally come out with something to write home about. 'You and I' is arguably the best song on her sophomore release, Born This Way, and now has a video to match." A Slant Magazine writer commented that the publication had a mixed reaction to the video, saying that it "is essentially a collection of disconnected images we couldn't make heads or tails of."

=== Fashion films ===
On September 1, 2011, Gaga announced on her Twitter account that she had shot five "fashion films" related to the song's music video with Dutch photographers Inez van Lamsweerde and Vinoodh Matadin. The characters for each of the videos are: Jo Calderone (Gaga's alter ego), Yüyi (a mermaid), Nymph, Bride, and finally Barn Hooker and Mother. After the tweet, Gaga released the first video, titled "Haus of Ü featuring Nymph". The two-minute black-and-white video featured Gaga with minimal make-up, wearing a short dress, performing ballet choreography. As wind blows around her, the singer looks intently toward the camera, with the parting shot in color. The second video featured her as the bride from the opening sequence of the music video. The fashion film portrayed her in the same costume, gradually removing it and her wig. At the end, she is topless with her hand covering her breasts. Interspersed between are scenes portraying people dressed like Gaga, and appearances by Taylor Kinney, who was in the music video, and the singer's stylist Nicola Formichetti. The third fashion film portrayed the singer as the mermaid Yüyi. She sits in a director's chair, flopping her tail. It also shows two crew members carrying Yüyi toward the barn, where the music video was filmed. Formichetti also makes a cameo in this video.

== Live performances ==
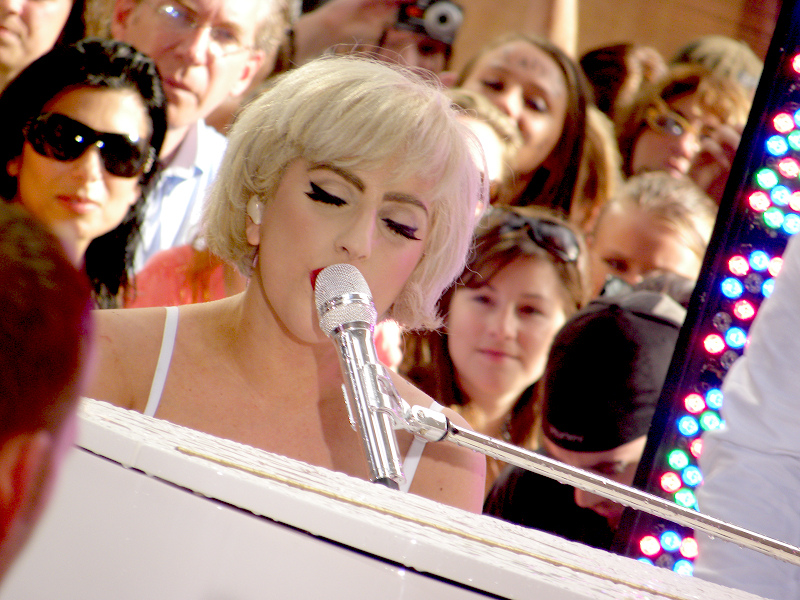
Gaga performing "You and I" on the Today show on July 9, 2010

After the first performance of "You and I" at Elton John's White Tie and Tiara Ball, Gaga performed the song live on the television program Today on July 9, 2010, before an estimated crowd of 18,000–20,000 people, the largest ever to pack Rockefeller Plaza. It was next performed on the July 31, 2010, Phoenix stop of the Monster Ball Tour, where Gaga protested Arizona's immigration law SB 1070—which mandates that state police officers "question any person they suspect to be an illegal immigrant and imprison any aliens not carrying one of four allowed forms of proper identification"—and dedicated her performance of "You and I" to a boy whose family had been affected by the law. Gaga performed the album version of the track on The Oprah Winfrey Show on May 5, 2011, using a piano constructed from a wire high-heel structure while sitting on a high stool. The "less organic" version for the final "Harpo Hookups" episode featured an electric guitar and modified lyrics to include Oprah's name.

The song was on the set list of the HBO television special, Lady Gaga Presents the Monster Ball Tour: At Madison Square Garden, which aired originally on May 7, 2011, in the United States. Gaga's performance of "You and I" from the HBO special aired on American Idol, the night after she mentored the four remaining contestants, and the week following Haley Reinhart's performance of the song. She performed a jazz version of "You and I" at Radio 1's Big Weekend in Carlisle, Cumbria on May 18, 2011. The third performance of the album version of the song was on the Paul O'Grady Live show in London, on June 17, 2011. Wearing a dress by the late Gianni Versace, Gaga perched atop a New York City-inspired fire escape, where she sang the song. Ryan Love of Digital Spy had a preview of the show's recording, and said that it was a "real treat" to hear Gaga sing the song. On August 1, 2011, Gaga performed "You and I" on the American TV talk show program The View. On August 28, 2011, Gaga attended the 2011 MTV Video Music Awards dressed as Jo Calderone. As Calderone, she opened the show with a four-minute monologue, explaining his broken relationship with Gaga. Following the monologue, joined on stage by Brian May, she performed "You and I". On October 6, 2011, she filmed a pre-recorded interview and performance for the single on The Jonathan Ross Show. Later, on October 16, 2011, she performed the song during a concert at the Hollywood Bowl in Los Angeles for the Clinton Foundation.

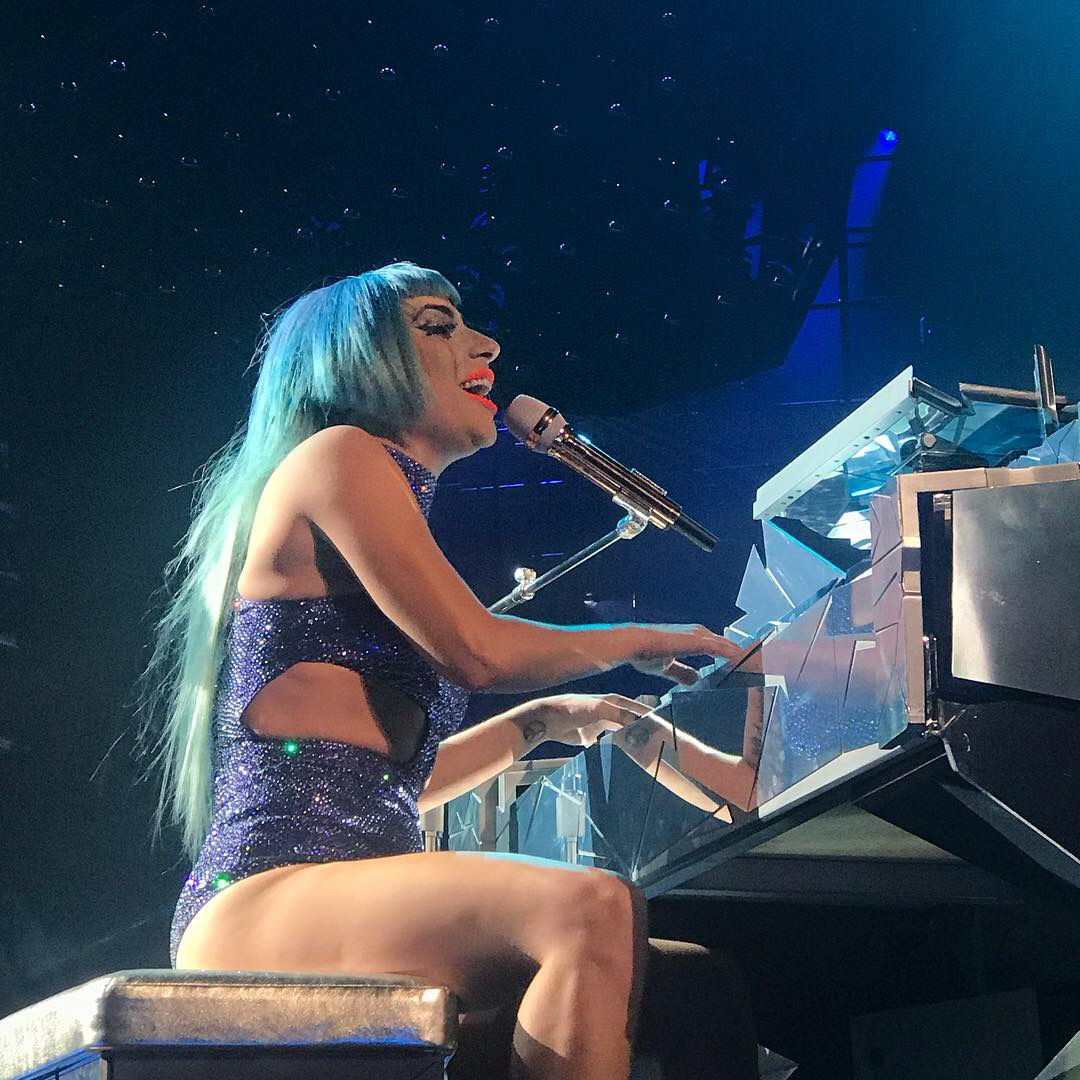
Gaga performing "You and I" during her Las Vegas residency show, Enigma

On the ABC special, A Very Gaga Thanksgiving, the singer performed the song backed by a "piano-and-trumpet arrangement". On November 30, during the CBS special titled The Grammy Nominations Concert Live! – Countdown to Music's Biggest Night—where the nominations for the 54th Grammy Awards were revealed—Gaga performed "You and I" along with Jennifer Nettles of the country band Sugarland while Kristian Bush played the guitar. During the performance, she changed the lyrics to fit the occasion: "With your high cowboy boots on. Oh Sugarland, it's been six whole years." According to James Montgomery of MTV News, she performed a "husky, musky version" of "You and I". She performed the song on the Born This Way Ball tour (2012–2013) by playing it on the piano before running around the stage. Like previous concert tours, the piano, fused to a motorcycle, was an elaborate prop that tied into the theme of her show, in keeping with the hair metal theme of Born This Way. The song was also part of the setlist of Gaga's 2014 residency show at Roseland Ballroom.

In July 2016, Gaga performed "You and I" at the "Camden Rising" concert at the BB&T Pavilion in Camden, New Jersey, which was part of the 2016 Democratic National Convention. The performance of the song was later included in her documentary film, Gaga: Five Foot Two (2017). In 2017, Gaga performed the song during both of her shows at the Coachella Festival, and included it in her set at the Deep From the Heart: The One America Appeal benefit concert in Texas, where she joined former US presidents Jimmy Carter, George H. W. Bush, Bill Clinton, George W. Bush and Barack Obama, and other performers in raising money to victims of Hurricanes Harvey, Irma and Maria. During the latter, she changed up the lyrics to address each president with the song. Gaga also performed "You and I" on her 2018–2020 Las Vegas residency show, Enigma. On November 2, 2020, she sang it along with "Shallow" at president-elect Joe Biden's final campaign rally in Pittsburgh, Pennsylvania. Between 2025–2026, she performed it as a surprise song on piano at select dates of The Mayhem Ball tour.

== Cover versions ==
Prior to the release of Born This Way, season ten American Idol contestant Haley Reinhart sang "You and I" as one of two performances for the "Songs from Now and Then" episode. Jimmy Iovine, head of Gaga's record label, asked for the song and Reinhart received her permission before the performance. Reviews of Reinhart's performance were mostly positive. Len Melisurgo of The Star-Ledger considered it a risky choice, since the song had not been released, but accepted that Reinhart "sounded amazing" by hitting "some really high notes". Brian Mansfield of USA Today described Reinhart's performance as an "old-fashioned dance-hall groove, kind of like a mid-'70s Elton John number. It's perfectly suited to that slippery growl that such a distinctive part of Haley's style. By the end of the song, she turns it into a gospel-style rocker, and she takes it to the house." Mansfield also noted that the American Idol judges—Randy Jackson, Jennifer Lopez and Steven Tyler—reacted positively to it. On the contrary, Jim Farber of the New York Daily News considered the choice risky and was thankful when Reinhart performed a more familiar song for her second round. On May 5, 2011, Reinhart's studio recording of "You and I" was released as a digital single to the iTunes Store, and appeared on the compilation album American Idol Top 5 Season 10. Mansfield, who initially had misgivings about Reinhart as a singer, complimented her studio recording of the track, feeling that if she could "get another 10 songs this good when it comes time to cut the record, then all my initial misgivings about this girl will vanish into thin air."

British singer Amelia Lily covered the song in November 2011 during her time on UK talent show The X Factor. On November 15, 2011, comedy-drama, musical TV series Glee featured a mash-up of Gaga's "You and I" and Eddie Rabbitt and Crystal Gayle's "You and I", performed by Matthew Morrison and Idina Menzel (as their respective characters Will Schuester and Shelby Corcoran) in the episode "Mash Off". The mash-up sold 23,000 digital downloads, and debuted on the Billboard Hot 100 chart at number 69, in the issue dated December 3, 2011.

On June 25, 2021, Ben Platt released a cover version of the song as part of the tenth anniversary edition of Born This Way.

== Track listing ==
Digital download

1. "You and I" (Radio Edit) [Main] – 4:06
2. "You and I" (Mark Taylor Radio Edit) – 3:55

CD single

1. "You and I" (Radio Edit) – 4:07
2. "You and I" (Mark Taylor Radio Edit) – 3:56

UK 7-inch picture disc

1. "You and I" (Wild Beasts Remix) – 3:51
2. "You and I" (Metronomy Remix) – 4:20

You and I – The Remixes

1. "You and I" (Wild Beasts Remix) – 3:51
2. "You and I" (Mark Taylor Remix) – 5:02
3. "You and I" (10 Kings Remix) – 4:29
4. "You and I" (ATB Remix) – 8:08
5. "You and I" (Metronomy Remix) – 4:20
6. "You and I" (Danny Verde Remix) – 7:48
7. "You and I" (Hector Fonseca Remix) – 8:03

== Credits and personnel ==
Credits adapted from the liner notes of Born This Way.

=== Recording and management ===
- Recorded at Warehouse Productions (Omaha, Nebraska) and Allertown Hill (United Kingdom)
- Mastered at Oasis Mastering (Burbank, California)
- Contains elements of the composition "We Will Rock You", written by Brian May and originally recorded by band Queen
- Published by Stefani Germanotta P/K/A Lady Gaga, Sony/ATV Songs LLC, House of Gaga Publishing Inc., GloJoe Music Inc. and Sony/ATV Music Publishing
- All rights on behalf of itself and Interscope Records, a division of UMG Recordings, Inc.
- Brian May appears courtesy of Hollywood Records (for US and Canada distribution) and Universal International (for worldwide distribution)

=== Personnel ===
- Lady Gaga – lead vocals, songwriter, producer, background vocals, piano and keyboards
- Robert John "Mutt" Lange – producer, background vocals, audio mixing
- Tom Ware and Horace Ward – recording
- Olle Romo – programming, recording
- Brian May – electric guitar
- Justin Shirley Smith – guitar recording
- Gene Grimaldi – audio mastering

== Charts ==
=== Weekly charts ===
Weekly chart performance for "You and I"
Chart (2011–2013)	Peak position
Australia (ARIA)	14
Austria (Ö3 Austria Top 40)	8
Belgium (Ultratip Bubbling Under Flanders)	4
Belgium (Ultratip Bubbling Under Wallonia)	4
Brazil (Billboard Brasil)	19
Canada Hot 100 (Billboard)	10
Canada AC (Billboard)	22
Canada CHR/Top 40 (Billboard)	17
Canada Hot AC (Billboard)	3
CIS Airplay (TopHit)	172
Croatia International Airplay (HRT)	3
Czech Republic (Rádio Top 100 Oficiální)	26
France (SNEP)	98
Germany (GfK)	21
Hungary (Mahasz)	24
Iceland (Tónlistinn)	20
Ireland (IRMA)	32
Israel (Media Forest)	5
Italy Airplay (EarOne)	11
Italy (FIMI)	19
Japan (Japan Hot 100)	8
Lebanon (The Official Lebanese Top 20)	5
Netherlands (Dutch Top 40 Tipparade)	2
Netherlands (Single Top 100)	83
New Zealand (Recorded Music NZ)	5
Scottish Singles Sales (Official Charts)	18
Slovakia (Rádio Top 100 Oficiálna)	18
South Korea International Singles (Gaon)	66
Switzerland (Schweizer Hitparade)	32
UK Singles (Official Charts)	23
US Billboard Hot 100	6
US Adult Contemporary (Billboard)	15
US Adult Pop Airplay (Billboard)	6
US Dance Club Songs (Billboard)	1
US Pop Airplay (Billboard)	7
Venezuela Record Report	67

=== Year-end charts ===
2011 year-end chart performance for "You and I"
Chart (2011)	Position
Australia (ARIA Dance)	30
Canada (Canadian Hot 100)	65
Croatia International Airplay (HRT)	45
UK Singles (Official Charts)	170
US Billboard Hot 100	71
US Adult Pop Airplay (Billboard)	41
US Hot Dance Club Songs (Billboard)	45
US Pop Airplay (Billboard)	45
US Radio Songs (Billboard)	75

2012 year-end chart performance for "You and I"
Chart (2012)	Position
US Adult Contemporary Songs (Billboard)	48

== Certifications ==
Certifications for "You and I"
Region	Certification	Certified units/sales
Australia (ARIA)	2× Platinum	140,000^{‡}
Brazil (Pro-Música Brasil)	3× Platinum	180,000^{‡}
New Zealand (RMNZ)	Gold	7,500^{*}
United Kingdom (BPI)	Silver	200,000^{‡}
United States (RIAA)	3× Platinum	3,000,000^{‡}
^{*} Sales figures based on certification alone.^{‡} Sales+streaming figures based on certification alone.

== Release history ==
Release dates and formats for "You and I"
Region	Date	Format	Version(s)	Label(s)	Ref.
United States (Note: The lyrics differentiate depending on the state where it is played.)	August 23, 2011	Contemporary hit radio	Original	Streamline; KonLive; Interscope	
Italy	September 2, 2011	Radio airplay	Original	Universal	
Various	September 18, 2011	Digital download	Remixes	Interscope	
United Kingdom	September 18, 2011	Digital download	Original	Streamline; KonLive; Interscope	
United Kingdom	September 26, 2011	7-inch picture disc	Wild Beasts remix; Metronomy remix	Streamline; KonLive; Interscope	
Germany	September 30, 2011	CD	Original	Interscope	
Various	December 18, 2012	Digital download	Jazz	Universal	

== See also ==
- List of Billboard Hot 100 top-ten singles in 2011
- List of Billboard Dance Club Songs number ones of 2011
