= You Can't Run from Love =

Single by Eddie Rabbitt

from the album Radio Romance
- B-side: "You Got Me Now"
- Released: March 1983
- Genre: Country
- Length: 3:40
- Label: Elektra
- Songwriters: Eddie Rabbitt; David Malloy; Even Stevens
- Producer: David Malloy

Eddie Rabbitt singles chronology
"You and I" (1982)	"You Can't Run from Love" (1983)	"You Put the Beat in My Heart" (1983)

"You Can't Run from Love" is a song co-written and recorded by American country music artist Eddie Rabbitt. It was released in March 1983 as the second single from the album Radio Romance. "You Can't Run from Love" was the follow-up to Rabbitt's duet with Crystal Gayle, "You and I". (Coincidentally, a Crystal Gayle solo recording, "Our Love Is on the Faultline", preceded "You Can't Run From Love" in the number 1 position.) The song was Rabbitt's twelfth number one single on the country chart. The single went to number one for one week and spent a total of thirteen weeks on the country chart. "You Can't Run From Love" peaked at number fifty-five on the Hot 100 and number two on the Hot Adult Contemporary chart. It was written by Rabbitt, Even Stevens and David Malloy.

== Charts ==
=== Weekly charts ===
Chart (1983)	Peak position
US Billboard Hot 100	55
US Adult Contemporary (Billboard)	2
US Hot Country Songs (Billboard)	1
Canada Country Singles (RPM)	1
Canada Adult Contemporary (RPM)	4

=== Year-end charts ===
Chart (1983)	Position
US Adult Contemporary (Billboard)	27
US Hot Country Songs (Billboard)	30
