= You and I (Eddie Rabbitt and Crystal Gayle song) =

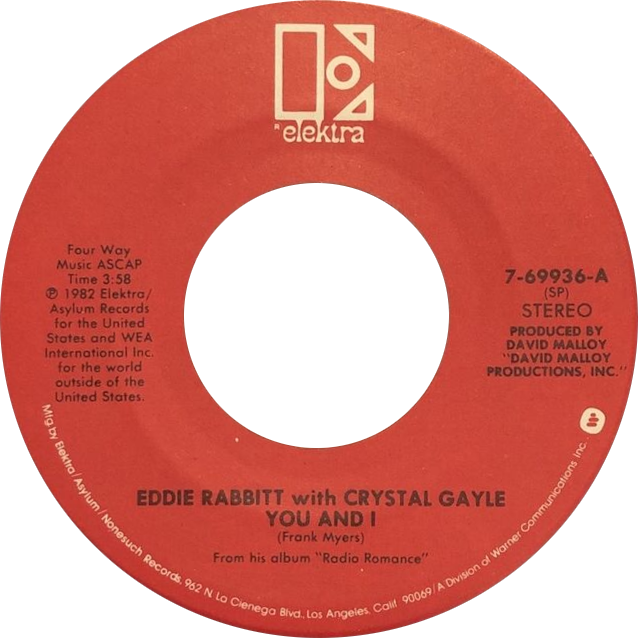
- One of pressings of the US single

Single by Eddie Rabbitt & Crystal Gayle

from the album Radio Romance
- B-side: "All My Life, All My Love"
- Released: October 1982
- Recorded: 1982
- Genre: Country pop
- Length: 4:00
- Label: Elektra (US); Mercury (intl.)
- Songwriter: Frank J. Myers
- Producer: David Malloy

Eddie Rabbitt singles chronology
"I Don't Know Where to Start" (1982)	"You and I" (1982)	"You Can't Run from Love" (1983)

Crystal Gayle singles chronology
"Livin' in These Troubled Times" (1982)	"You and I" (1982)	"'Til I Gain Control Again" (1983)

"You and I" is a duet recorded by American country music artists Eddie Rabbitt and Crystal Gayle. It was written by Frank J. Myers, produced by David Malloy, and released in October 1982 as the first single from Rabbitt's eighth studio album Radio Romance (1982). "You and I" became a major country pop crossover hit for both artists.

== Track listing ==
7" single

1. "You And I" – 3:58
2. "All My Life, All My Love" – 2:44

== Critical reception ==
- In 2005, the song was ranked number seven on CMT's 100 Greatest Duets in Country Music. Gayle performed the duet with Raul Malo of The Mavericks since Rabbitt had died of lung cancer in 1998.
- "You and I" went to number one on the US Billboard Country chart for one week.
- On the Billboard Hot 100, the song spent 29 weeks on the chart, peaking at number seven, and making it the 12th biggest song of the year.

== Charts ==
Chart (1982–1983)	Peak position
Australia (Kent Music Report)	88
Canada Top Singles (RPM)	35
Canada Adult Contemporary (RPM)	1
Canadian RPM Country Tracks	6
UK Singles Chart (Official Charts Company)	81
US Hot Country Songs (Billboard)	1
US Billboard Hot 100	7
US Adult Contemporary (Billboard)	2

Year-end chart (1983)	Rank
US Top Pop Singles (Billboard)	12

== In popular culture ==
The song was used for the 1984 wedding of Greg Nelson and Jenny Gardner on the American soap opera All My Children.

The US musical television series Glee covered this song in a mash-up with the Lady Gaga's same titled song in the third season episode "Mash Off" (2011). American sitcom 30 Rock covered the song when Jenna (Jane Krakowski) practised and sang it with contestant Brock (Tyler Merna) on the Live Results Show of America's Kidz Got Singing at the end of the sixth season episode, "Hey, Baby, What's Wrong, Part 2" (2012).
