= Best of Dolly Parton, Vol. 3 =

Best of Dolly Parton, Vol.3

Greatest hits album by Dolly Parton
- Released: September 22, 1987
- Recorded: 1973–1985
- Genres: Country; pop
- Length: 32:29
- Label: RCA Victor

Dolly Parton chronology
| The Best There Is (1987) | Best of Dolly Parton, Vol.3 (1987) | Rainbow (1987) |

Best of Dolly Parton, Vol. 3 is a 1987 compilation of Dolly Parton's early- to mid-1980s hits that RCA Records issued after she left the label. This was the first Dolly Parton CD that featured the song "Potential New Boyfriend" because Burlap & Satin did not have a CD release at the time.

== Track listing ==
| No. | Title | Writer(s) | Length |
|---|---|---|---|
| 1. | "Don't Call It Love" | Tom Snow, Dean Pitchford | 3:13 |
| 2. | "Save the Last Dance for Me" | Doc Pomus, Mort Shuman | 3:54 |
| 3. | "Real Love" (duet with Kenny Rogers) | David Malloy, Richard "Spady" Brannon, Randy McCormick | 3:49 |
| 4. | "We Had It All" | Troy Seals, Donnie Fritts | 3:55 |
| 5. | "Tie Our Love (In a Double Knot)" | Jeff Silbar, John Reid | 3:21 |
| 6. | "Think About Love" | Brannon, Tom Campbell | 3:27 |
| 7. | "Potential New Boyfriend" | Steve Kipner, John Lewis Parker | 3:39 |
| 8. | "Do I Ever Cross Your Mind" | Dolly Parton | 4:01 |
| 9. | "Tennessee Homesick Blues" | Parton | 3:35 |
