= Diamonds & Rhinestones: The Greatest Hits Collection =

Greatest hits album by Dolly Parton
- Released: November 18, 2022
- Recorded: 1971–2020
- Genres: Country; pop
- Length: 72:42
- Labels: RCA; Legacy

Dolly Parton chronology
Run, Rose, Run (2022)	Diamonds & Rhinestones: The Greatest Hits Collection (2022)	Rockstar (2023)

Professional ratings
Review scores
Source	Rating
AllMusic	3.5/5 stars

Diamonds & Rhinestones: The Greatest Hits Collection is a compilation album by American country music artist Dolly Parton. It was released by RCA Records and Legacy Recordings on November 18, 2022.

The album includes Parton's collaborations with Kenny Rogers, Loretta Lynn and Tammy Wynette, and Swedish dance duo Galantis. The album also includes songs featured in Parton's films, including "9 to 5" from the 1980 movie by the same name, "Tennessee Homesick Blues" from Rhinestone, and "Red Shoes" from Dumplin'. The compilation is the first Dolly Parton album to include "When Life Is Good Again", which was issued as a stand-alone single in 2020.

Diamonds & Rhinestones reached a peak of number 24 on the Billboard 200 album chart in September 2026, shortly after Parton's death that August.

== Track listing ==
All tracks are written by Dolly Parton, except where noted.

No.	Title	Writer(s)	Album	Length
1.	"9 to 5"		9 to 5 and Odd Jobs (1980)	2:45
2.	"Jolene"		Jolene (1974)	2:40
3.	"Here You Come Again"	Barry Mann; Cynthia Weil	Here You Come Again (1977)	2:56
4.	"Islands in the Stream" (with Kenny Rogers)	Barry Gibb; Robin Gibb; Maurice Gibb	Eyes That See in the Dark (1983)	4:09
5.	"I Will Always Love You"		Jolene (1974)	2:54
6.	"Coat of Many Colors"		Coat of Many Colors (1971)	3:03
7.	"My Tennessee Mountain Home"		My Tennessee Mountain Home (1973)	3:07
8.	"The Bargain Store"		The Bargain Store (1975)	2:41
9.	"Baby I'm Burnin'"		Heartbreaker (1978)	2:36
10.	"Better Get to Livin'"	Parton; Kent Wells	Backwoods Barbie (2008)	3:34
11.	"Why'd You Come in Here Lookin' Like That"	Bob Carlisle; Randy Thomas	White Limozeen (1989)	2:32
12.	"Love Is Like a Butterfly"		Love Is Like a Butterfly (1974)	2:20
13.	"Heartbreaker"	Carole Bayer Sager; David Wolfert	Heartbreaker (1978)	3:34
14.	"Red Shoes"	Parton; Linda Perry	Dumplin' soundtrack (2018)	2:57
15.	"The Seeker"	Bill McElhiney; Parton	Dolly (1975)	3:13
16.	"Together You and I"		Better Day (2011)	3:56
17.	"Two Doors Down"		Here You Come Again (1977)	3:07
18.	"When Life Is Good Again"	Parton; Wells	non-album single (2020)	4:11
19.	"Tennessee Homesick Blues"		Rhinestone soundtrack (1984)	3:23
20.	"It's All Wrong, But It's All Right"		Here You Come Again (1977)	3:18
21.	"Real Love" (with Kenny Rogers)	David Malloy; Randy McCormick; Richard "Spady" Brannon	Real Love (1985)	3:52
22.	"Silver Threads and Golden Needles" (with Tammy Wynette and Loretta Lynn)	Dick Reynolds; Jack Rhodes	Honky Tonk Angels (1993)	2:23
23.	"Faith" (with Galantis and Mr. Probz)	Christian Karlsson; David Saint Fleur; Dennis Stehr; Parton; Eric Aukstikalnis; Henrik Jonback; Jan Postma; Jazelle Rodriguez; John Hiatt; Jordi de Fluiter; Samuel James Zammarelli	Church (2020)	3:07
Total length:				72:42

== Charts ==
=== Weekly charts ===
Initial weekly chart performance for Diamonds & Rhinestones: The Greatest Hits Collection
Chart (2022)	Peak position
Australian Albums (ARIA)	47
Australian Country Albums (ARIA)	6
Irish Albums (IRMA)	67
Scottish Albums (Official Charts)	9
UK Albums (Official Charts)	32
UK Country Albums (Official Charts)	1
UK Country Compilation Albums (OCC)	1
UK Album Downloads (Official Charts)	25
US Billboard 200	27
US Top Country Albums (Billboard)	4

2026 weekly chart performance for Diamonds & Rhinestones: The Greatest Hits Collection
Chart (2026)	Peak position
Belgian Albums (Ultratop Flanders)	168
Canadian Albums (Billboard)	20
Irish Albums (Official Charts)	4
New Zealand Albums (RMNZ)	3
Scottish Albums (Official Charts)	35
Swiss Albums (Schweizer Hitparade)	71
UK Albums (Official Charts)	5
US Billboard 200	24

=== Year-end charts ===
Year-end chart performance for Diamonds & Rhinestones: The Greatest Hits Collection
Chart (2022)	Position
Australian Country Albums (ARIA)	39
Chart (2023)	Position
US Top Country Albums (Billboard)	49
Chart (2024)	Position
Australian Country Albums (ARIA)	31

== Certifications and sales ==
Region	Certification	Certified units/sales
United Kingdom (BPI)	Gold	219,657

== Release history ==
Release dates and formats for Diamonds & Rhinestones: The Greatest Hits Collection
Region	Date	Format	Label	Ref.
Various	November 18, 2022	Digital download; streaming	RCA; Legacy	
United States	November 18, 2022	CD; LP	RCA; Legacy	
