= Rainbow (Dolly Parton album) =

Studio album by Dolly Parton
- Released: November 23, 1987
- Recorded: c. July 1987
- Studios: Record One, Los Angeles; Ocean Way, Hollywood; A&M, Hollywood
- Genres: Pop; country
- Length: 40:03
- Label: Columbia
- Producer: Steve "Gold-E" Goldstein

Dolly Parton chronology
Best of Dolly Parton, Vol. 3 (1987)	Rainbow (1987)	White Limozeen (1989)

Singles from Rainbow
- 1. "The River Unbroken" Released: November 23, 1987; 2. "I Know You by Heart" Released: February 8, 1988; 3. "Make Love Work" Released: July 25, 1988

Professional ratings
Review scores
Source	Rating
AllMusic	2/5 stars
The Encyclopedia of Popular Music	2/5 stars

Rainbow is the twenty-eighth solo studio album by Dolly Parton. It was released on November 25, 1987, by Columbia Records. The original plan, when Parton signed with CBS, was for her to alternate between releasing pop and country albums (rather than trying to combine the two styles on each album), but due to Rainbow's poor sales and tepid critical reception, the plan was quickly abandoned, and Parton more or less focused on recording country material for the remainder of her association with the label.

The album was among Parton's lowest charting albums to that point. It stalled at #153 on the U.S. Billboard 200 pop albums chart and barely cracked the top twenty on the Top Country Albums chart; its first single, "The River Unbroken" missed the Hot Country Songs top 40 entirely, stalling at #63, and did not make the Billboard Hot 100 pop chart. The album's second single, "I Know You by Heart", a duet with Smokey Robinson, did not chart at all, but was covered by Bette Midler the following year for the soundtrack of the movie Beaches. A third single, "Make Love Work", was released in June 1988, but fared poorly, likely due, in part, to competition from "Wildflowers", a top-ten single by Parton, Emmylou Harris and Linda Ronstadt released from their 1987 Trio album a month earlier.

Rainbow's release coincided with the launch of Parton's ill-fated 1987-1988 variety show Dolly. Two songs from the album, "Could I Have Your Autograph" and "Savin' It for You", were also highlighted on the show. Another track, presumably recorded during the Rainbow sessions, "Don't Stop Dreamin'", was never officially released, though it was highlighted on episode 6 of Dolly and was used in promotional material for the show.

== Track listing ==
Rainbow track listing
No.	Title	Writer(s)	Length
1.	"The River Unbroken"	David Batteau, Darrell Brown	4:33
2.	"I Know You by Heart" (with Smokey Robinson)	George Merrill, Shannon Rubicam, Dean Pitchford	4:20
3.	"Dump the Dude"	Steve Dorff, Allan Rich	3:52
4.	"Red Hot Screaming Love"	Mike Chapman	4:11
5.	"Make Love Work"	Eric Kaz	3:26
6.	"Everyday Hero"	Blaise Tosti, Robert O'Hearn	4:35
7.	"Two Lovers"	William "Smokey" Robinson	3:22
8.	"Could I Have Your Autograph"	Dolly Parton	3:20
9.	"Savin' It for You"	Dino Fekaris, David Loeb	4:18
10.	"More Than I Can Say"	Dolly Parton	4:06
Total length:			40:03

== Personnel ==
- Dolly Parton – vocals
- Waddy Wachtel – acoustic and electric guitar
- Kevin Dukes, Rick Vito – electric guitar, slide guitar
- Dann Huff, Michael Landau – electric guitar
- Al Perkins – steel guitar
- Danny Kortchmar – 12-string acoustic guitar
- Bob Glaub, Leland Sklar, Abraham Laboriel – bass
- Steve Goldstein – keyboards, acoustic piano, synthesizer, bass synthesizer, drum programming
- Bill Cuomo – synthesizer, synthesizer organ
- Robert O'Hearn – synthesizer
- Patricia Mabee – harpsichord
- John Vigran – drum programming
- Craig Krampf – drum overdubs, drum programming
- Jim Keltner – drums, percussion
- Buck Trent – electric banjo
- Bobby Bruce – violin
- Tom Scott – saxophone
- David Campbell – string arrangements, conductor
- Hammer Smith – chromatic harmonica
- Julia Waters, Maxine Waters, Richard Dennison, Carmen Twillie, Mike Chapman, Blaise Tosti, Anita Ball – backing vocals

== Charts ==
=== Weekly charts ===
Weekly chart performance for Rainbow
Chart (1987)	Peak position
Australian Albums (Kent Music Report)	83
Canada Top Albums/CDs (RPM)	83
US Billboard 200	153
US Top Country Albums (Billboard)	18
US Cashbox Country Albums	16

=== Year-end charts ===
Year-end chart performance for Rainbow
Chart (1988)	Peak position
US Top Country Albums (Billboard)	62
