= The Best There Is =

The Best There Is may refer to:

- Wolverine: The Best There Is
- The Best There Is (Dolly Parton album)
- The Best There Is (Charley Pride album)
- "The Best There Is" Lena Andersson (singer)
