= The River Unbroken =

Single by Dolly Parton

from the album Rainbow
- B-side: "More Than I Can Say"
- Released: November 23, 1987
- Genre: Country pop; roots rock
- Length: 3:56
- Label: Columbia
- Songwriters: Darrell Brown, David Batteau
- Producer: Steve "Golde" Goldstein

Dolly Parton singles chronology
"Those Memories of You" (1987)	"The River Unbroken" (1987)	"I Know You By Heart" (1988)

"The River Unbroken" is a song by American singer-songwriter Dolly Parton, which was released in 1987 as the lead single from her twenty-eighth studio album Rainbow. It was written by Darrell Brown and David Batteau, and produced by Steve "Golde" Goldstein.

"The River Unbroken" was Parton's first single for Columbia, following her move to the label from RCA. The song reached No. 63 on the Billboard Hot Country Songs chart. In Canada, it peaked at No. 51 on the RPM Country Singles chart, and No. 23 on the Adult Contemporary chart.

== Critical reception ==
On its release, Billboard described the song as a "rootsy, rock-flavored ballad" that should "regain her pop stature". Cash Box considered the song "enjoyable" and Parton's voice "as distinctive as ever", but felt "hard country" fans would be "disappointed" with the song's direction ("The lyrics could be country, but the arrangement surely is not").

In a review of Rainbow, Ken Tucker of The Philadelphia Inquirer described the song as having "the firm assurance of a potential hit". In a retrospective review, Barry Weber of AllMusic felt both "The River Unbroken" and "Could I Have Your Autograph" are "somewhat intriguing, but they're certainly not strong enough to survive the glossy, overtly polished production".

== Track listing ==
7-inch, CD and cassette single

1. "The River Unbroken" – 3:56
2. "More Than I Can Say" – 4:06

== Personnel ==
The River Unbroken

- Dolly Parton – lead vocals, harmony vocals, backing vocals
- Julia Waters, Maxine Waters, Richard Dennison – backing vocals
- Waddy Wachtel – acoustic guitar
- Kevin Dukes – electric guitar, slide electric guitar
- Steve "Golde" Goldstein – synthesizer, drum programming
- Bob Glaub – bass
- John Vigran – drum programming

Production

- Steve "Golde" Goldstein – producer
- Richard Bosworth – mixing, recording
- Bernie Grundman – mastering

Other

- Tony Lane, Nancy Donald – art direction
- Annie Leibovitz – photography

== Charts ==
Chart (1987)	Peak position
Canadian RPM Country Tracks	51
Canadian RPM Adult Contemporary Tracks	23
US Billboard Hot Country Singles	63
US Billboard Adult Contemporary	43

== Cover versions ==
In 1989, American gospel singer Russ Taff recorded his own version of the song for his album The Way Home. For the album, the song's co-writer Darrell Brown contributed background vocals and some production work. The album reached No. 1 on the Billboard Top Contemporary Christian chart.
