= Think About Love =

Compilation album by Dolly Parton
- Released: April 15, 1986
- Recorded: 1979–1984
- Genres: Country; pop
- Length: 26:35
- Label: RCA Victor

Dolly Parton chronology
Collector's Series (1985)	Think About Love (1986)	Trio (1987)

Singles from Think About Love
- 1. "We Had It All" Released: August 18, 1986

Think About Love is a 1986 compilation of previously released Dolly Parton tracks, many of which were presented in remixes or alternate takes. RCA Records released the album after Parton departed from the label and joined Columbia Records. The project was helmed by Mark Wright, a producer at RCA at the time, and it remains unclear to what extent, if any, Parton was involved in the selection of songs or in the remixing process. The album is also unusual in that it only features one Parton original, "Do I Ever Cross Your Mind".

Of the eight tracks, only three appear to be unaltered from their original release: "It's Such a Heartache", "Tie Our Love (In a Double Knot)" and "Even a Fool Would Let Go". The other tracks have all been modified in various ways. "Think About Love" differs dramatically from the version on Real Love with the addition of the lyric "Think about love" before the bridge, a shortened instrumental section, much louder drum overdubs and a punchier mix overall. This version is actually the single remix and is the version that was played on the radio during its chart run and released on 45, but it has never been re-released on any CD anywhere in the world. "We Had It All" is a completely different vocal take from the version on The Great Pretender. Instead of the piano being the primary instrument, this time the song is driven by an acoustic guitar. This remixed version of "We Had It All" was released as a single in the fall of 1986 and would reach number 31 on the country singles chart in the U.S.; it would be Parton's final charting single during her tenure with RCA.

== Track listing ==
No.	Title	Writer(s)	From the album	Length
1.	"Think About Love" (Remix)	Richard "Spady" Brannan, Tom Campbell	Real Love	3:20
2.	"It's Such a Heartache"	Even Stevens, Hillary Kanter	Real Love	3:23
3.	"Tie Our Love (In a Double Knot)"	Jeff Silbar, John Reid	Real Love	3:26
4.	"She Don't Love You (Like I Love You)" (Remix)	Jerry Butler, Calvin Carter, Curtis Mayfield	The Great Pretender	3:55
5.	"We Had It All" (Remix)	Donnie Fritts, Troy Seals	The Great Pretender	3:55
6.	"Do I Ever Cross Your Mind?" (Remix)	Dolly Parton	Heartbreak Express	3:52
7.	"I Can't Help Myself (Sugar Pie, Honey Bunch)" (Remix)	Holland–Dozier–Holland	The Great Pretender	2:47
8.	"Even a Fool Would Let Go"	Tom Snow, Kerry Chater	Dolly, Dolly, Dolly	3:17

== Chart performance ==
Chart (1986)	Peak position
US Top Country Albums (Billboard)	54
US Cashbox Country Albums	41
