= The Great Pretender (Dolly Parton album) =

Studio album by Dolly Parton
- Released: January 23, 1984
- Recorded: October 24–December 5, 1983
- Studios: Record One, Los Angeles
- Genre: Synth-pop
- Length: 35:44; 53:37 (Re-Release)
- Label: RCA Victor
- Producer: Val Garay

Dolly Parton chronology
Burlap & Satin (1983)	The Great Pretender (1984)	Rhinestone (1984)

Singles from The Great Pretender
- 1. "Save the Last Dance for Me" Released: November 28, 1983; 2. "Downtown" Released: March 12, 1984; 3. "She Don't Love You (Like I Love You)" Released: 1984

Professional ratings
Review scores
Source	Rating
AllMusic	2/5 stars
The Encyclopedia of Popular Music	2/5 stars

The Great Pretender is the twenty-sixth solo studio album by American entertainer Dolly Parton. It was released on January 23, 1984, by RCA Records. It is composed of covers of hits from the 1950s and 1960s. The album was produced by Val Garay. It made heavy use of synthesizers and had a decidedly pop sound. The first single, a remake of the Drifters' 1960 hit "Save the Last Dance for Me" was a top 10 country single for Parton in early 1984 and came close to making the pop Top 40 as well (#45). Dolly Parton's cover of the 1965 Petula Clark hit "Downtown" was the album's second single. The title song was originally a hit for the Platters in 1956.

In 1986, a remixed version of the track "We Had It All" was included on Think About Love, a compilation album of remixes of previously released Parton material; the song was released as a single in late 1986, and provided an additional top 30 single for Parton.

The Great Pretender was the first Dolly Parton album to be issued on the then-new CD format at the time of its release.

It was released digitally for the first time on 4 December 2015.

== Track listing ==
No.	Title	Writer(s)	Length
1.	"Save the Last Dance for Me"	Doc Pomus, Mort Shuman	3:50
2.	"I Walk the Line"	Johnny Cash	3:34
3.	"Turn! Turn! Turn! (To Everything There Is a Season)"	Pete Seeger	4:24
4.	"Downtown"	Tony Hatch	3:19
5.	"We Had it All"	Donnie Fritts, Troy Seals	3:51
6.	"She Don't Love You (Like I Love You)"	Jerry Butler, Calvin Carter, Curtis Mayfield	3:41
7.	"We'll Sing in the Sunshine"	Gale Garnett	3:25
8.	"I Can't Help Myself (Sugar Pie, Honey Bunch)"	Holland–Dozier–Holland	2:50
9.	"Elusive Butterfly"	Bob Lind	2:47
10.	"The Great Pretender"	Buck Ram	3:41
Total length:			36:22

1993 The Collection Bonus Tracks
No.	Title	Writer(s)	Length
11.	"Harper Valley PTA"	Tom T. Hall	3:13
12.	"D-I-V-O-R-C-E"	Bobby Braddock, Curly Putman	2:44
13.	"I Will Always Love You"	Dolly Parton	2:55
14.	"Jolene"	Dolly Parton	2:41
15.	"9 to 5"	Dolly Parton	2:45
16.	"Here You Come Again"	Barry Mann, Cynthia Weil	2:57
Total length:			53:37

== Chart performance ==
Album

Chart (1984)	Peak position
Australia (Kent Music Report)	22
Canada Top Albums (RPM)	69
Dutch Albums (Album Top 100)	38
Norwegian Albums (VG-lista)	18
Swedish Albums (Sverigetopplistan)	9
US Hot Country Albums (Billboard)	7
US Billboard 200	73
US Cashbox Country Albums	7
US Cash Box Top Albums	131

Album (Year-End)

Chart (1984)	Peak Position
US Top Country Albums (Billboard)	49
