= Rhinestone (soundtrack) =

Soundtrack album by various artists
- Released: June 18, 1984
- Recorded: c. August 1983–January 1984
- Studio: Smoketree Ranch (Chatsworth)
- Genre: Country
- Length: 50:19
- Label: RCA Victor
- Producer: Mike Post; Dolly Parton

Dolly Parton chronology
The Great Pretender (1984)	Rhinestone (1984)	Once Upon a Christmas (1984)

Singles from Rhinestone
- 1. "Tennessee Homesick Blues" Released: May 28, 1984; 2. "God Won't Get You" Released: August 20, 1984; 3. "Goin' Back to Heaven" Released: October 1984; 4. "What a Heartache" Released: 1984

Professional ratings
Review scores
Source	Rating
Allmusic	1/5 stars
The Encyclopedia of Popular Music	2/5 stars

Rhinestone is the soundtrack album from the 1984 film of the same name starring Dolly Parton and Sylvester Stallone. It was released on June 18, 1984, by RCA Victor. The album was produced by Mike Post and Parton. It peaked at number 22 on the Billboard Top Country Albums chart and number 135 on the Billboard 200. The Dolly Parton-composed soundtrack produced two top ten singles on the Billboard Hot Country Songs chart: "Tennessee Homesick Blues" and "God Won't Get You", which peaked at numbers one and ten, respectively.

== Background ==
Dolly Parton stated in her 1994 autobiography, My Life and Other Unfinished Business, that she regards the soundtrack album as some of the best work she's done, though the film Rhinestone was largely regarded as a critical and commercial flop. She also cites "What a Heartache" as a personal favorite of all the songs she has written. She has since re-recorded twice. The first time was on the 1991 album Eagle When She Flies and again on the 2002 album Halos & Horns.

== Release and promotion ==
The album was released June 18, 1984, on CD, cassette, 8-track, and LP.

=== Singles ===
"Tennessee Homesick Blues" was released as the album's first single in May 1984. It peaked at number one on both the Billboard Hot Country Songs chart and the Canadian RPM Country Singles chart.

"God Won't Get You", was released in August 1984 and peaked at number 10 on the Billboard Hot Country Songs chart and number eight on the Canadian RPM Country Singles chart.

"Goin' Back to Heaven" was released in October 1984 as the fourth single and it did not chart.

"What a Heartache" was released as a single in the Netherlands in 1984 and did not chart.

== Commercial performance ==
The album debuted at number 54 on the Billboard Top Country Albums chart dated July 28, 1984. It peaked at number 32 on the chart dated September 8, its seventh week on the chart. The album charted for a total of 17 weeks. It also peaked at number 135 on the Billboard 200.

== Reissues ==
Rhinestone was released digitally for the first time on December 4, 2015.

== Track listing ==
All tracks are written by Dolly Parton, with the exception of "The Day My Baby Died", words by Phil Alden Robinson and music by Mike Post.

No.	Title	Performer(s)	Length
1.	"Tennessee Homesick Blues"	Dolly Parton	3:35
2.	"Too Much Water"	Randy Parton	2:41
3.	"The Day My Baby Died"	Rusty Buchanan	2:55
4.	"One Emotion After Another"	Dolly Parton	3:36
5.	"Goin' Back to Heaven"	Stella Parton and Kin Vassy	4:15
6.	"What a Heartache"	Dolly Parton	4:42
7.	"Stay Out of My Bedroom"	Sylvester Stallone with Dolly Parton	3:40
8.	"Woke Up in Love"	Dolly Parton and Sylvester Stallone	3:23
9.	"God Won't Get You"	Dolly Parton	4:15
10.	"Drinkin'stein"	Sylvester Stallone	3:55
11.	"Sweet Lovin' Friends"	Dolly Parton and Sylvester Stallone	3:29
12.	"Waltz Me to Heaven"	Floyd Parton	3:21
13.	"Butterflies"	Dolly Parton	3:20
14.	"Be There"	Dolly Parton and Sylvester Stallone	3:12
Total length:			50:19

== Personnel ==
Adapted from the album liner notes.

Performance

- Mike Baird – drums
- Dennis Belfield – bass
- John Bidasio – steel guitar
- Rusty Buchanan – lead vocals
- Richard Dennison – background vocals
- Linda Dillard – background vocals
- John Goux – guitars
- David Lindley – fiddle
- Tommy Morgan – harmonica
- Larry Muhoberac – piano
- Willie Ornelas – drums
- Dolly Parton – lead vocals
- Floyd Parton – lead vocals
- Randy Parton – lead vocals, background vocals
- Stella Parton – lead vocals
- Herb Pedersen – guitars, banjo, background vocals
- Pete Robinson – synthesizers
- Joey Scarbury – background vocals
- Leland Sklar – bass
- Sylvester Stallone – lead vocals
- Ian Underwood – synthesizers
- Kim Vassy – lead vocals
- Steve Watson – guitars

Production

- Dolly Parton – producer
- Doug Parry – recording, mixing
- Mike Post – producer, arrangements
- Ray Sheibley – second engineer

Other personnel

- Tim Bryant – art direction, art design
- Steve Shapiro – photography

== Charts ==
Chart performance for Rhinestone
Chart (1984)	Peak position
US Billboard 200	135
US Top Country Albums (Billboard)	32
US Cashbox Country Albums	27
