= Don't Call It Love (song) =

Single by Dolly Parton

from the album Real Love
- B-side: "We Got Too Much"
- Released: January 1985
- Genre: Country pop
- Length: 3:13
- Label: RCA
- Songwriters: Tom Snow, Dean Pitchford
- Producer: David Malloy

Dolly Parton singles chronology
"God Won't Get You" (1984)	"Don't Call It Love" (1985)	"Real Love" (1985)

"Don't Call It Love" is a song first released by American singer Kim Carnes on her 1981 album Mistaken Identity. The following year it was covered by Captain and Tennille and Dusty Springfield from their albums More Than Dancing and White Heat.

== Dolly Parton cover ==
"Don't Call It Love" was covered and released as a single by American singer Dolly Parton. It was released in January 1985 as the first single from the album Real Love. The song reached number 3 on the Billboard Hot Country Singles & Tracks chart. Her rendition was also an Adult Contemporary hit, reaching number 12 in the US and number seven in Canada.

=== Chart performance ===
Weekly

Chart (1985)	Peak position
Canadian RPM Country Tracks	5
Canada RPM Adult Contemporary	7
US Hot Country Songs (Billboard)	3
US Billboard Adult Contemporary	12

Year-End

Chart (1985)	Peak Position
US Hot Country Songs (Billboard)	34
