= Collector's Series (Dolly Parton album) =

Greatest hits album by Dolly Parton
- Released: June 3, 1985
- Recorded: 1969–1978
- Genre: Country
- Label: RCA Victor

Dolly Parton chronology
Real Love (1985)	Collector's Series (1985)	Think About Love (1986)

Professional ratings
Review scores
Source	Rating
AllMusic	3/5 stars
The Encyclopedia of Popular Music	3/5 stars

Collector's Series is an album by singer-songwriter Dolly Parton, released in 1985 by RCA Records.

== Album information ==
This album is a compilation, and included some of Parton's chart hits, along with lesser known album cuts originally released between 1969 and 1978. It was created for further promotion by her record label, which would soon drop her despite her success.

It did not do much for her career, as she had no promotion, being dropped from the label very soon after. However, Collectors Series was released during a time when none of Parton's classic early 1970s work had yet been issued on CD (given the fairly recent advent of the medium), and thus was the first instance signature Parton songs "Jolene", "I Will Always Love You", "Coat of Many Colors" and "The Bargain Store" appeared on CD.

== Track listing ==
All songs written by Dolly Parton, except for "In the Ghetto" and "Heartbreaker".

Side 1

1. "Jolene"
2. "I'm a Drifter"
3. "My Blue Ridge Mountain Boy"
4. "In the Ghetto"
5. "She Never Met A Man (She Didn't Like)"
6. "Coat of Many Colors"
7. "I Will Always Love You"

Side 2

1. "Two Doors Down"
2. "Love Is Like a Butterfly"
3. "Applejack"
4. "The Bargain Store"
5. "Me And Little Andy"
6. "The Seeker"
7. "Heartbreaker"
