= Run, Rose, Run =

Studio album by Dolly Parton
- Released: March 4, 2022
- Recorded: 2021
- Studios: Velvet Apple Studios (Nashville); Ben's Den Recording Studio (Hendersonville); The Sound House (Redding); The Freeway (Franklin); KWP Productions (Nashville); Dailey and Vincent (Nashville); Adventure Studio (Nashville)
- Genres: Country; bluegrass
- Length: 38:43
- Label: Butterfly
- Producers: Dolly Parton; Richard Dennison; Tom Rutledge

Dolly Parton chronology
A Holly Dolly Christmas (2020)	Run, Rose, Run (2022)	Diamonds & Rhinestones: The Greatest Hits Collection (2022)

Singles from Run, Rose, Run
- 1. "Big Dreams and Faded Jeans" Released: January 14, 2022; 2. "Blue Bonnet Breeze" Released: February 11, 2022; 3. "Woman Up (And Take It Like a Man)" Released: March 4, 2022

Run, Rose, Run is the forty-eighth and penultimate studio album by American singer-songwriter Dolly Parton. It was released March 4, 2022, through Parton's own Butterfly Records. The album was produced by Parton with Richard Dennison and Tom Rutledge, and is a companion album to the suspense novel of the same name, co-written by Parton and James Patterson.

The album was preceded by the release of the singles "Big Dreams and Faded Jeans" and "Blue Bonnet Breeze". Critical reviews were largely positive.

On March 21, 2022, it was announced Parton would star in and produce a film adaptation of the novel produced by Reese Witherspoon's company Hello Sunshine. However, the film's fate is unknown due to Parton's death in 2026.

== Background ==
Parton prematurely announced she was working on a novel with James Patterson in July 2020, during an interview with Eddie Stubbs on WSM. Following the broadcast, the interview was posted to WSM's SoundCloud page, but was deleted by mid-afternoon the next day as the news came earlier than planned.

She first mentioned a new bluegrass album in June 2021 during a press conference at Dollywood announcing their new Heartsong Lodge & Resort. Parton teased the album again in July 2021 during an interview with Tim McGraw on his Apple Music radio show Beyond the Influence. She mentioned having recorded duets with Merle Haggard's son (later identified as Ben Haggard) and previous collaborator Joe Nichols. Parton also said she had recorded some bluegrass and some country material for the record.

== Release and promotion ==
On Wednesday, August 11, 2021, Parton officially announced she had teamed up with James Patterson to write a new book titled Run, Rose, Run, to be published on March 7, 2022, by Little, Brown and Company. She also announced the book would be released alongside a companion album of 12 original songs produced by Richard Dennison and Tom Rutledge. The album was released March 4, 2022, on CD, digital download, and LP. Parton's online store offered an exclusive marble red LP, while Barnes & Noble, Target, Walmart, and Talk Shop Live offered opaque blue, clear green, peach, and violet LPs, respectively. Target stores also offered a CD edition containing an exclusive bookmark. Jeni's Splendid Ice Creams offered an exclusive digital version of the album containing one bonus track, "Rose of My Heart" (which was originally released in March 2009 as a bonus track on the Collector's Edition of Parton's 2008 album Backwoods Barbie sold at Cracker Barrel).

=== Singles ===
The album's first single, "Big Dreams and Faded Jeans", was released on January 14, 2022. "Blue Bonnet Breeze" was released as the second single on February 11. "Woman Up (And Take It Like a Man)" was issued as the third single alongside the album's release on March 4.

== Critical reception ==
Professional ratings
Aggregate scores
Source	Rating
AnyDecentMusic?	6.8/10
Metacritic	68/100
Review scores
Source	Rating
AllMusic	3.5/5 stars
The Arts Desk	3/5 stars
Clash	8/10
Evening Standard	4/5 stars
The Independent	4/5 stars
Mojo	3/5 stars
NME	3/5 stars
Rolling Stone	3/5 stars
The Sydney Morning Herald	4/5 stars
The Times	4/5 stars

Run, Rose, Run was met with favorable reviews from music critics. At Metacritic, which assigns a normalized rating out of 100 to reviews from professional publications, the album received an average score of 68, based on six reviews, indicating "generally favorable reviews".

Writing for The Times, Will Hodgkinson described the album as "bluegrass-tinged country with the energy of rock and the emotion of MOR balladry." He said "there are no surprises" on the album, yet it demonstrates "Parton's remarkable ability to write songs that hide their sophistication underneath language and themes anyone can understand and relate to." In a positive review for the Evening Standard, David Smyth said this may seem "more like a money-printing marketing exercise than any deep-rooted desire to produce a great American novel," but "the album itself is significantly more straightforward than all the elements around it." He felt the songs are "good enough to deserve more than status as footnotes to a book." Helen Brown gave a positive review for The Independent, saying the album will leave listeners "marveling at Parton's ability to capitalize on her slick professionalism without ever compromising her huge heart and sparkling spirit." Emma Harrison at Clash described the album as "effervescent, exuberant, wry, but always appealing." She said the album "displays Dolly's evergreen storytelling prowess and is a vibrant and compelling body of work." Further describing the album as "uplifting and vulnerable," she said it "effortlessly accompanies the story that unfolds in her novel. However, it is strong enough to work as a standalone body of work." Stephen Thomas Erlewine of AllMusic also reviewed the album positively. He theorized Parton might be "cloaking her personal experiences in the guise of a fictional narrative...to allude to her past in this fashion." He also added the album is "a satisfying listen on its own terms" separate from the novel.

In a mixed review for The Arts Desk, Tim Cumming described the album as "a hot mix of bluegrass and acoustic, down-home country." Nick Levine of NME also gave a mixed review of the album. He called the album "a thoroughly enjoyable listen that confirms what fans already know: even a middle-of-the-road Dolly Parton album has lashings of charm." In a mixed review for Rolling Stone, Jonathan Bernstein said "Run, Rose, Run is an impressive display of Parton's songwriting and vocal mastery that nevertheless leaves one hoping she one day releases the classic late-era record she's so clearly primed to make, should she choose." Andy Fyfe of Mojo gave the album a mixed review, rating it three out of five stars and saying it kept Parton in "safer and predictable territory" rather than trying anything new.

== Commercial performance ==
Run, Rose, Run debuted and peaked at number 34 on Billboard 200 with 17,000 equivalent album units sold in its first week. The album also debuted and peaked at number four on the Billboard Top Country Albums chart. It is Parton's forty-seventh top ten entry on the chart, extending her record for the most top tens by a female artist. The album also peaked at number one on the Billboard Top Americana/Folk Albums chart and the Billboard Bluegrass Albums chart. It peaked at number six on the Billboard Independent Albums chart. In Europe the album peaked at number 23 on the UK Albums chart, number one on the UK Country Albums chart, number four on the UK Independent Albums chart, number four on the Scottish Albums chart, number 76 on the Dutch Albums chart, and number 122 on the Belgium Albums chart. It also peaked at number six on the Australian Country Albums chart.

== Track listing ==
All tracks are written by Dolly Parton.

No.	Title	Length
1.	"Run"	2:45
2.	"Big Dreams and Faded Jeans"	4:07
3.	"Demons" (featuring Ben Haggard)	3:24
4.	"Driven"	2:40
5.	"Snakes in the Grass"	2:41
6.	"Blue Bonnet Breeze"	5:19
7.	"Woman Up (And Take It Like a Man)"	2:27
8.	"Firecracker"	3:13
9.	"Secrets"	2:52
10.	"Lost and Found" (featuring Joe Nichols)	3:18
11.	"Dark Night, Bright Future"	2:37
12.	"Love or Lust" (featuring Richard Dennison)	3:20
Total length:		38:43

Jeni's Splendid Ice Creams edition bonus track
No.	Title	Length
13.	"Rose of My Heart"	2:34
Total length:		41:17

== Personnel ==
Adapted from the album liner notes.

Performance

- David Angell – violin (6, 12)
- Monissa Angel – violin (6)
- Appalachian Road Show – background vocals (10)
  - Barry Abernathy, Jim Van Cleve, Darrell Webb
- Pat Bergeson – harmonica (2, 7)
- Becky Isaacs Bowman – background vocals (4)
- Jamie Dailey – background vocals (1)
- David Davidson – violin (6, 12)
- Richard Dennison – piano (1, 4, 8, 11, 12), B3 organ (2, 7), keys (3, 9), guest artist (12), background vocals (2, 3, 5, 7, 9, 10)
- Ben Haggard – guest artist (3)
- Vicki Hampton – background vocals (2, 3, 5, 7, 9, 10)
- Steve Hinson – steel guitar (10)
- Paul Hollowell – B3 organ (5)
- Sonya Isaacs – background vocals (4)
- Dirk Johnson – keys (10)
- Steve Mackey – bass (1–5, 7, 8–11)
- Jimmy Mattingly – fiddle (1, 8, 11), mandolin (6, 9, 12)
- Charlie McCoy – harmonica (3)
- Aaron McCune – background vocals (1)
- Joe Nichols – guest artist (10)
- Jennifer O'Brien – background vocals (2, 3, 5, 7, 9, 10)
- Richie Owens – Weissenborn resonator guitar (5)
- Carole Rabinowitz – cello (6)
- Sarighani Reist – cello (12)
- Dolly Parton – lead vocals, harmony vocals (3, 6, 8–10)
- Tom Rutledge – banjo (1, 4, 11), acoustic guitar (3, 5–7, 9, 10)
- Val Storey – background vocals (8)
- Scott Vestal – banjo (8)
- Darrin Vincent – background vocals (1)
- Rhonda Vincent – background vocals (8)
- Kent Wells – acoustic guitar (1, 2, 4, 8, 11), electric guitar (1–5, 7–11)
- Kristin Wilkinson – viola (12)
- Lonnie Wilson – drums (1–5, 7–11)

Production

- Daniel Bacigalupi – Dolby Atmos mastering assistant, vinyl mastering assistant (Infrasonic Mastering, Nashville, Tennessee)
- Mark Capps – mixing (Sound Shop East, Nashville, Tennessee)
- Joe Corey – recording engineer (The Sound House, Redding, California)
- Joey Crawford – recording engineer (Adventure Studio, Nashville, Tennessee)
- David Davidson – string arrangement (tracks 6, 12)
- Richard Dennison – producer, co-producer, vocal arrangements
- Ben Isaacs – recording engineer, edit engineer (Ben's Den Recording Studio, Hendersonville, Tennessee)
- Chris Latham – edit engineer (The Gorilla's Nest, Joelton, Tennessee)
- Pete Lyman – Dolby Atmos mastering (Infrasonic Mastering, Nashville, Tennessee)
- Andrew Mendelson – mastering (Georgetown Masters, Nashville, Tennessee)
- Mark Needham – Dolby Atmos mixing (In the Woods Studio)
- Dolly Parton – producer, executive producer
- Piper Payne – vinyl mastering (Infrasonic Mastering, Nashville, Tennessee)
- Tom Rutledge – producer, co-producer, recording engineer, edit engineer (Velvet Apple Studios, Nashville, Tennessee)
- Phillip Smith – Dolby ATMOS mixing assistant (In the Woods Studio)
- Darrin Vincent – recording engineer (Dailey and Vincent, Nashville, Tennessee)
- Kent Wells – recording engineer (KWP Productions, Nashville, Tennessee)
- Lonnie Wilson – recording engineer (The Freeway, Franklin, Tennessee)

Other personnel

- Stacie Huckeba – photographer
- Iisha Lemming – wardrobe production
- Vance Nichols – wardrobe production
- Riley Reed – wardrobe production
- Cheryl Riddle – hair
- J.B. Rowland – art direction
- Rebecca Seaver – creative production manager
- Steve Summers – costume designer

== Charts ==
=== Weekly charts ===
Chart performance for Run, Rose, Run
Chart (2022)	Peak position
Australian Country Albums (ARIA)	6
Belgian Albums (Ultratop Flanders)	122
Dutch Albums (Album Top 100)	76
Scottish Albums (Official Charts)	4
UK Albums (Official Charts)	23
UK Country Albums (Official Charts)	1
UK Independent Albums (Official Charts)	4
UK Americana Albums (Official Charts)	1
US Billboard 200	34
US Americana/Folk Albums (Billboard)	1
US Independent Albums (Billboard)	6
US Top Bluegrass Albums (Billboard)	1
US Top Country Albums (Billboard)	4

=== Year-end charts ===
2022 year-end chart performance for Run, Rose, Run
Chart (2022)	Position
US Top Bluegrass Albums (Billboard)	2
US Top Current Album Sales (Billboard)	83
