= Tie Our Love (In a Double Knot) =

Single by Dolly Parton

from the album Real Love
- B-side: "I Hope You're Never Happy"
- Released: April 7,1986
- Genre: Country
- Length: 3:21
- Label: RCA
- Songwriters: Jeff Silbar, John Reid
- Producer: David Malloy

Dolly Parton singles chronology
"Think About Love" (1985)	"Tie Our Love (In a Double Knot)" (1986)	"We Had It All" (1986)

"Tie Our Love (In a Double Knot)" is a song written by Jeff Silbar and John Reid, and recorded by American entertainer Dolly Parton. It was released in February 1986 as the fourth single from Parton's album Real Love. (The song also appeared on Think About Love, a 1986 album of previously issued Parton material.) The song reached #17 on the Billboard Hot Country Singles & Tracks chart.

== Chart performance ==
Chart (1986)	Peak position
US Hot Country Songs (Billboard)	17
Canadian RPM Country Tracks	20
