= Elusive Butterfly =

Single by Bob Lind

from the album Don't Be Concerned
- A-side: "Cheryl's Goin' Home"
- Released: November 1965 as B-side; January 1966 as A-side
- Recorded: ca. August/September 1965
- Genre: Folk
- Length: 2:51
- Label: World Pacific 77808
- Songwriter: Bob Lind
- Producer: Richard Bock

Bob Lind singles chronology
"Wandering" (1965)	"Elusive Butterfly" (1965)	"Remember The Rain" (1966)

"Elusive Butterfly" is a popular song written by Bob Lind, released as a single in December 1965, which reached number 5 on both the Billboard Hot 100 and the adult contemporary chart in the spring of 1966. It also reached number 5 in the UK, after entering the charts on 19 February 1966, remaining there for five weeks. In Australia, Lind's "Elusive Butterfly" entered the charts on April 10, 1966, and spent three weeks at number 2 during July of that year. On the New Zealand listener charts it reached number 12.

== Original version ==
Bob Lind wrote "Elusive Butterfly" around sunrise while pulling an all-nighter in 1964: at that time he was living in Denver, performing at local folk clubs. Lind credits the song's inspiration as the W. B. Yeats' poem "The Song of Wandering Aengus", stating: "I wanted to write something that [like Yeats' poem] had the sense we feel of being most alive when we're searching or looking or chasing after something. That expectation is more life affirming than getting the thing you're after." The song was originally five verses long and, with the instrumental passages Lind included, its performance time approximated ten minutes: (Lind quote:) "I played it for everybody I knew but I didn't [think] 'Man, this is my best song: it's going to be a hit [that] millions of people [will] hear...It was just another [Bob Lind] song. I was thrilled [then] by everything I wrote."

In 1965, feeling that Denver's folk music scene was in decline, Lind relocated to California, first staying in San Francisco; the day after he'd bused down to Los Angeles, Lind played a performance tape made at a Denver club for Richard Bock, head of World Pacific Records. Although Bock had founded World Pacific – originally known as Pacific Jazz – to promote West Coast jazz, the label had in July 1965 been acquired by Liberty Records and thus Bock was eager to sign pop and rock acts to his label, and Lind was signed to World Pacific the day after he played his tape for Bock. (Lind has been the only World Pacific artist to chart on the pop-oriented Hot 100 chart in Billboard magazine.)

Lind was also signed to Metric Music, Liberty Records publishing arm, and before Lind's own recording sessions commenced Metric A&R man Lenny Waronker had him play several of his songs for top Los Angeles record producer Jack Nitzsche in hopes of Nitzsche optioning Lind's songs for artists Nitzsche was set to produce. Lind later admitted embarrassment over proffering his compositions for Nitzsche's consideration: "I thought the whole idea was stupid. What was a brilliant, classically trained arranger with his melodic scope going to hear in my twangy-folky little songs?...[Nitzsche] sat there listening to me plunk my way through four or five tunes and stunned me by telling Lenny: 'You finally got an honest writer here.' From the beginning Jack heard something in my music that I did not. He didn't pick anything from that batch of songs for the artists he was cutting but he told Lenny he liked my stuff. Lenny mentioned it to the 'Powers That Be' at World Pacific and they signed Jack to produce me."

Lind elsewhere stated that World Pacific head Richard Bock had originally intended to himself produce Lind's recordings; however: "there were some technical difficulties that had nothing to do with the music itself. So they were trying to find another producer. They were talking to Chad Stuart and Sonny Bono. Then they said: 'Let's try Jack Nitzsche'." (Bock was credited as producer on the "Elusive Butterfly" single which cited Nitzsche as arranger.) Lind recalls Nitzsche saying "I don't think there are any hits [among Lind's compositions]. But we're going to make a beautiful album", and also that Nitzsche – who besides producing was also the arranger for Lind's sessions – only began prepping first Lind's recording session about four days before its scheduled date: "The day and night before the session [Nitzsche] barricaded himself in his office and wrote those breathtakingly beautiful charts, those tear-jerking string lines, all of it...He amazed me with what he found in my songs."

Lind's first recording session at Sunset Sound with session personnel including Hal Blaine on drums, Leon Russell on piano, Henry Diltz on banjo and Carol Kaye on bass yielded four songs including "Elusive Butterfly", which Lind wanted to record as written with five verses: (Lind quote:) "Jack said no one would listen to a song that long, and I should only do two." Liberty Records wished to release a single by Lind before recording him further: (Lind quote:) "The record company executives asked me which song I thought we should release as the single. I told them anything but 'Elusive Butterfly'. The execs and Jack agreed. There was just nothing like it on the charts at the time and it didn't smell like a hit to any of us." The choice of single was the track "Cheryl's Goin' Home" with "Elusive Butterfly" – (Lind quote:)"[which] we thought was the weakest song" – serving as B-side to prevent split airplay. While "Cheryl's Goin' Home" upon its November 1965 release failed to generate any significant radio action, Miami area station WQAM began airing "Elusive Butterfly" with the track ranking in the top ten of the station's hit parade by the year's end with resultant interest from other Florida radio stations affording "Elusive Butterfly" regional hit status strong enough to cause Liberty Records to reissue Lind's debut single with "Elusive Butterfly" as the A-side in January 1966. Debuting at number 83 on the Billboard Hot 100 dated January 22, 1966, "Elusive Butterfly" rose to the top ten in six weeks with its Hot 100 peak of number 5 attained on the chart dated March 12, 1966.

In January or February 1966 Lind recorded eight tracks at Sunset Sound with the same personnel as previously including Nitzsche as producer-arranger; with the four tracks from Lind's 1965 session these tracks made up Lind's debut album released in February 1966 and entitled Don't Be Concerned after the opening lyric of the chorus of "Elusive Butterfly".

== Rival cover versions ==
The song was also recorded and released, in 1966, in the British Isles by Val Doonican, with both the Lind and Doonican versions reaching a UK chart peak of number 5 - Doonican's subsequent to Lind's - in March/April 1966; in Ireland only Doonican's version was a major hit, peaking at number 3. Lind later said of Doonican's cover: "When you write a song, you can't claim ownership of it. Val Doonican’s version was different from mine, but I kinda liked that."

In South Africa a local cover of "Elusive Butterfly" by Judy Page (af) debuted at number 20 in the Top 20 chart of 22 April 1966, a week before the number 19 debut of the Lind original: although the Page cover initially retained ascendance, the Lind original ultimately rose higher, to a number 4 peak on 20 May 1966, when the Page cover held at its number 5 peak.

== Other charting versions ==
Jane Morgan released a version on her 1966 album Fresh Flavor, and the song reached number 9 on the Easy Listening chart.

Carmen McRae released a version as a single in 1968 that reached number 35 on the Adult Contemporary chart.

== Other versions ==
- Petula Clark on her 1966 album I Couldn't Live Without Your Love: Lind has cited Clark's version of the song as his favorite, adding: "nobody believes me when I say that – she wasn’t considered cool in the 60s – she was considered mainstream and very vanilla but I love her version of 'Elusive Butterfly.'" Clark's version omitted the second verse of the Lind original, instead featuring the two stanzas of the original's first verse as two verses separated by the chorus.
- Cher on her 1966 album The Sonny Side of Chér: the track subsequently served as B-side for Cher's international 1968 single "You Better Sit Down Kids" (the original US pressing of "You'd Better Sit Down Kids" featured "Mama (When My Dollies Have Babies)" as B-side, with "Elusive Butterfly" subsequently substituted).
- Billy Walker on his 1966 album A Million and One: the track subsequently serving as the B-side for Walker's 1969 number 12 C&W hit "Smoky Places".
- Richard Anthony as "Un Papillon Qui Vole" _{French} on his 1966 EP It's Hits Francais.
- The Bachelors on their album Hits of the 60's in 1966.
- South African trumpeter Hugh Masekela on his 1966 album Hugh Masekela's Next Album.
- Graham Bonney on his 1966 album Super Girl.
- Lou Christie on his 1966 album Painter of Hits.
- Johnny Mathis on his 1966 album So Nice.
- Bobby Vee as part of a medley "A Hundred Pounds of Clay"/"Elusive Butterfly" on his 1966 album 30 Hits Of The 60's, Vol. 2.
- Glen Campbell on his 1968 album Hey Little One.
- The Lennon Sisters on their 1968 album The Lennon Sisters Today!!
- Gary Lewis & the Playboys on their 1968 album Now!
- Stanley Turrentine on his 1968 album Easy! - Stanley Turrentine Plays the Pop Hits
- Aretha Franklin on her 1969 album Soul '69.
- The Lettermen on their 1969 album Hurt So Bad.
- The Four Tops released a version on their 1970 album Still Waters Run Deep.
- Judy Lynn on her 1971 album Parts of Love: the track also served as B-side of the single "When the Love Starts to Come".
- Susan Jacks on her 1980 album Ghosts.
- Dolly Parton on her 1984 album The Great Pretender: the track also served as B-side for the single "Save the Last Dance for Me".
- Jane Olivor on her 2001 album Songs of the Season.
- Livingston Taylor on his 2006 album Unsolicited Material.
- Marc Almond released it as a single in March 2024 to promote his covers album I'm Not Anyone.

== In media ==
- Florence Henderson performed "Elusive Butterfly" on the first season of The Muppet Show.
