= Holy Water (Galantis song) =

Single by Galantis

from the album Church
- Released: 27 September 2019
- Length: 2:56
- Label: Atlantic; Big Beat
- Songwriters: Christian Karlsson; Jimmy Koitzsch; Henrik Jonback; Cathy Dennis
- Producers: Bloodshy; Svidden; Henrik Jonback

Galantis singles chronology
"Roots" (2019)	"Holy Water" (2019)	"Faith" (2019)

Music video
- "Holy Water" on YouTube

"Holy Water" is a song recorded by Swedish duo Galantis, incorporating uncredited vocals provided by British singer-songwriter and record producer Cathy Dennis. It was released on 27 September 2019, through Atlantic and Big Beat Records, as the fourth single from their third studio album, Church (2020).

== Critical reception ==
Rachel Narozniak from Dancing Astronaut remarked the presence of "original lyrical concept", however with Galantis usual construction, similar to their past tracks such as "No Money" and "Runaway (U & I)". She also noted that the song is endowed with "driven chords that ascend in upbeat fashion in line with the cut's vocal, inescapably catchy vocal hooks, and buoyant breakdowns with deliberate dance floor appeal". Sarah Kocur from EDM.com called the song an "anthemic, effortlessly distorted single" which "gives listeners the last bit of summer energy as the season ends". Writing for Partyscene, Ivo Mollemans noted that it has "typical dance and pop elements" that the listeners are used to hear with Galantis. He indicated that the presence of "chords and vocals form the intro of the song and that immediately sets the tone for the rest of it" and really releases energy. According to him, the drop is "characterized by vocal chops that are still supported by chords and dance synths".

== Music video ==
The official music video of the song was released at the same day through Galantis YouTube channel. Directed by Jason Lester, who worked on Jesse McCartney song "Wasted", Fall Out Boy song "Wilson (Expensive Mistakes)" and Quinn XCII song "Werewolf", it features a choreography from synchronized swimming team Aqualillies and contains chopped quick edits in order to match the distorted vocals on the chorus of the track. The team perform in front of the eyes of jurors and spectators, including Galantis. In the course of the performance, the water is bathed in changing color worlds, and swimmers emanate from time to time at the edge of the pool to sing the lyrics of the song directly into the camera. DJ Mag France, Switzerland & Belgium deemed the clip of honoring synchronized swimming. Ivo Mollemans from Partyscene wrote that it "fits perfectly with the track, also because of the title".

== Charts ==
Chart (2019)	Peak position
Sweden Heatseeker (Sverigetopplistan)	7
US Hot Dance/Electronic Songs (Billboard)	27
