= Think About Love (song) =

Single by Dolly Parton

from the album Real Love
- B-side: "Come Back to Me"
- Released: November 11, 1985
- Recorded: January 1985
- Genre: Country pop; synth-pop
- Length: 3:27
- Label: RCA
- Songwriters: Richard "Spady" Brannan; Tom Campbell
- Producer: David Malloy

Dolly Parton singles chronology
"Real Love" (1985)	"Think About Love" (1985)	"Tie Our Love (In a Double Knot)" (1986)

"Think About Love" is a song recorded by American country music artist Dolly Parton, first released on her 1985 Real Love album. The song, written by Richard "Spady" Brannan and Tom Campbell, was an uptempo pop tune, employing (as did most of the other songs on Real Love) synthesizers and other distinctive pop flourishes. It was released as the album's third single in November 1985 and, despite its polished pop production, reached No. 1 on the U.S. country singles charts in March 1986; the single spent a total of fourteen weeks on the chart. The song was Parton's sixteenth number one country single as a solo artist and twentieth overall.

The song was remixed for its single version. The remixed version of the song also served as the title track on Parton's 1986 Think About Love album, which was composed of previously released tracks, many of which had been remixed. The single mix (the version played on the radio and available on 45) has never been released on any CD in the US or abroad. It would turn out to be Parton's last chart-topper on RCA, her label of the previous nineteen years. (She would switch to Columbia Records in 1987).

== Chart positions ==
Weekly

Chart (1985–1986)	Peak position
Australia (Kent Music Report)	74
US Hot Country Songs (Billboard)	1
Canadian RPM Country Tracks	1

Year-End

Chart (1986)	Peak Position
US Hot Country Songs (Billboard)	35
