= Telling Me Lies =

Single by Dolly Parton, Linda Ronstadt and Emmylou Harris

from the album Trio
- B-side: "Rosewood Casket"
- Released: May 11, 1987
- Recorded: 1986
- Genre: Country
- Label: Warner Bros.
- Songwriters: Betsy Cook; Linda Thompson
- Producer: George Massenburg

Dolly Parton, Linda Ronstadt and Emmylou Harris singles chronology
"To Know Him Is to Love Him" (1987)	"Telling Me Lies" (1987)	"Those Memories of You" (1987)

"Telling Me Lies" is a song written by Linda Thompson and Betsy Cook and recorded by Thompson for her 1985 album One Clear Moment, her first solo album, after divorcing husband and former collaborator Richard Thompson.

The song was covered by Linda Ronstadt, Dolly Parton and Emmylou Harris on their 1987 collaboration album Trio and released as the album's second single. It hit third place on the U.S. Country singles chart and the Top 40 of the Adult Contemporary play list in the fall of 1987. Thompson and Cook were nominated for the Grammy Award for Best Country Song at the 30th Annual Grammy Awards in 1988.

== Chart positions ==
Chart (1987)	Peak position
U.S. Billboard Hot Country Singles	3
Canadian RPM Country Tracks	6
