= Save the Last Dance for Me =

1960 Drifters song by Pomus and Shuman

Single by The Drifters

from the album Save the Last Dance for Me
- B-side: "Nobody But Me"
- Released: August 1960
- Recorded: 1960
- Genre: Pop; soul
- Length: 2:34
- Label: Atlantic
- Songwriters: Doc Pomus, Mort Shuman
- Producer: Jerry Leiber and Mike Stoller

The Drifters singles chronology
"Lonely Winds" (1960)	"Save the Last Dance for Me" (1960)	"I Count the Tears" (1960)

Official audio
- "Save the Last Dance for Me" on YouTube

"Save the Last Dance for Me" is a song written by Doc Pomus and Mort Shuman, first recorded in 1960 by American musical group the Drifters with Ben E. King on lead vocals. It has since been covered by several artists, including Tommy Leonetti, the DeFranco Family, Dolly Parton, Emmylou Harris, and Michael Bublé.

== Drifters' version ==
In a 1990 interview, songwriter Doc Pomus tells the story of the song being recorded by the Drifters and originally designated as the B-side of the record. He credits Dick Clark with turning the record over and realizing "Save the Last Dance" was the stronger song. The Drifters' version of the song, released a few months after Ben E. King left the group, would go on to spend three non-consecutive weeks at No. 1 on the U.S. pop chart, in addition to logging one week atop the U.S. R&B chart. In the United Kingdom, the Drifters' recording reached No. 2 in December 1960. This single was produced by Jerry Leiber and Mike Stoller, two noted American music producers who at the time had an apprentice relationship with a then-unknown Phil Spector. Although he was working with Leiber and Stoller at the time, it is unknown whether Spector assisted with the production of this record; however, many Spector fans have noticed similarities between this record and other music he would eventually produce on his own.

In the song, the narrator tells his lover she is free to mingle and socialize throughout the evening, but to save the final dance for him. During an interview on Elvis Costello's show Spectacle, American musician Lou Reed, who worked with Pomus, said the song was written on the day of Pomus' wedding to Willi Burke, a Broadway performer. Pomus suffered from polio and used crutches for mobility, and observed as his wife danced with their wedding guests. She loved dancing, while he was unable to join her due to his disability. The song gives Pomus's perspective of telling his new wife to enjoy dancing with others that evening but also remember he will take her home.

== Charts ==
=== Weekly charts ===
Chart (1960–1961)	Peak position
Canada (CHUM Charts Top 20)	1
New Zealand (Lever Hit Parade)	1
Italy (FIMI)	31
South Africa (Springbok)	1
UK	2
U.S. Billboard Hot 100	1
U.S. Billboard R&B	1
U.S. Cash Box Top 100	1

=== Year-end charts ===
Chart (1960)	Rank
South Africa	9
U.S. Billboard Hot 100	26
U.S. Cash Box	3

== Certifications ==
Region	Certification	Certified units/sales
New Zealand (RMNZ)	Gold	15,000^{‡}
United Kingdom (BPI)	Silver	200,000^{‡}
^{‡} Sales+streaming figures based on certification alone.

== Dolly Parton version ==
"Save the Last Dance for Me"

Single by Dolly Parton

from the album The Great Pretender
- B-side: "Elusive Butterfly"
- Released: November 28, 1983
- Recorded: November 1983
- Genre: Pop
- Length: 3:54
- Label: RCA
- Songwriters: Doc Pomus, Mort Shuman
- Producer: Val Garay

Dolly Parton singles chronology
"Islands in the Stream" (1983)	"Save the Last Dance for Me" (1983)	"Downtown" (1984)

In 1983, Dolly Parton recorded "Save the Last Dance for Me," releasing it as a single in late November; the song subsequently appeared on Parton's album of 1950s and 60s covers The Great Pretender, released in January 1984. Reaching the top ten on the country singles chart in late February, the single also crossed over, reaching No. 45 on the Billboard Hot 100 in the United States.

=== Charts ===
Chart (1983–1984)	Peak position
Australia (Kent Music Report)	31
Canadian RPM Country Tracks	2
U.S. Billboard Hot Country Singles	3
U.S. Billboard Hot 100	45
U.S. Billboard Hot Adult Contemporary Tracks	12
New Zealand (Recorded Music NZ)	50

== The DeFranco Family version ==
"Save the Last Dance for Me"

Single by the DeFranco Family

from the album Save the Last Dance for Me
- B-side: "Because We Both Are Young"
- Released: April 1974
- Length: 2:58
- Label: 20th Century
- Songwriters: Doc Pomus, Mort Shuman
- Producer: Walt Meskell

The DeFranco Family singles chronology
"Abra-ca-dabra" (1973)	"Save the Last Dance for Me" (1974)	"Write Me a Letter" (1974)

The DeFranco Family (featuring Tony DeFranco) released "Save the Last Dance for Me" in 1974 as a single and the title track of their 2nd album; the single peaked at No. 18 on the Billboard Hot 100 and No. 8 on Canada's RPM 100 chart. The B-side of the single is "Because We Both Are Young", written by Tom Bahler and Harry Shannon.

== Michael Bublé version ==
"Save the Last Dance for Me"
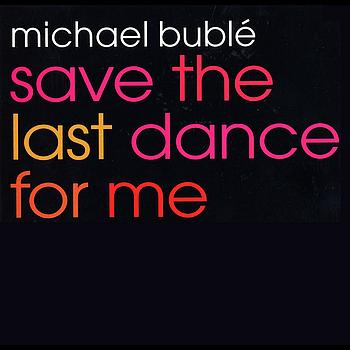

Single by Michael Bublé

from the album It's Time
- Released: April 4, 2006
- Genre: Pop
- Length: 3:38
- Label: 143, Reprise
- Songwriters: Doc Pomus, Mort Shuman

Michael Bublé singles chronology
"Home" (2005)	"Save the Last Dance for Me" (2006)	"Just in Time" (2006)

Music video
- "Michael Bublé - Save The Last Dance For Me [Official Music Video]" on YouTube

"Save The Last Dance For Me" was later covered by Canadian crooner Michael Bublé, and released as the third and final single from his second studio album, It's Time. The song was heavily remixed for its release as a single.

=== Background ===
For its release as a single, the song was heavily remixed, with mixes from producers including Ralphi Rosario and Eddie Baez. All of the chart positions for the single are for each of the remixed versions of the song respectively. The single first peaked at No. 22 on the Billboard Hot Dance Club Play Chart in September 2005. After Bublé performed the album version of the song during the closing credits of the film The Wedding Date, this version was released to radio, peaking at No. 5 on the Billboard adult contemporary chart, as well as reaching No. 99 on the Billboard Hot 100.

The music video for the track was once again directed by Noble Jones, who directed the videos for both of the album's previous singles – Home and Feeling Good. The music video was choreographed by Raymondo Chan, a Salsa Latin dance coach and performer. It was shot in Vancouver, Canada.

=== Track listing ===
- CD / DVD single
1. "Save the Last Dance for Me" (album version) – 3:38
2. "Save the Last Dance for Me" (Starcity remix) – 3:20
3. "Save the Last Dance for Me" (live version – video) – 4:14
4. "Save the Last Dance for Me" (music video) – 3:42
- Digital download
1. "Save the Last Dance for Me" (album version) – 3:38
2. "Save the Last Dance for Me" (Ralphi's Anthomic vocal) – 9:36
3. "Save the Last Dance for Me" (Eddie's Anthem mix) – 9:53
4. "Save the Last Dance for Me" (Ralphi's Hydrolic dub) – 8:29

=== Charts ===
==== Weekly charts ====
Chart (2006)	Peak position
US Billboard Hot 100	99
US Billboard Hot Adult Contemporary Tracks	5

=== Year-end charts ===
Chart (2006)	Rank
US Adult Contemporary (Billboard)	7

=== Certifications ===
Region	Certification	Certified units/sales
United States (RIAA)	Gold	500,000^{*}
^{*} Sales figures based on certification alone.

== Other versions ==
- A German-language cover by Ivo Robić, titled "Mit 17 fängt das Leben erst an", peaked at number one in Germany for two weeks in 1961. Robić rerecorded the song in Croatian as well, titled "Sedamnaestogodišnjoj", and released it in 1962. Robić's Croatian version was then covered by Prljavo Kazalište in 1980 and Severina in 2008, under titles "17 ti je godina tek" and "18 ti je godina tek", respectively.
- Buck Owens released a cover version in 1962 that peaked at No. 11 on the US country charts and appeared on his album Together Again.
- In 1977, John Davidson reached No. 22 on the U.S. Adult Contemporary chart and No. 44 on the Canadian AC chart.

== In popular culture ==
- In 1960, American female R&B singer Damita Jo recorded an "answer record" to "Save the Last Dance for Me". Her song, entitled "I'll Save the Last Dance for You", built around the original song's melody and thus credited to Shuman and Pomus, peaked at No. 22 on the Billboard Hot 100 pop chart in December 1960.

== See also ==
- List of Hot 100 number-one singles of 1960 (U.S.)
- List of number-one R&B singles of 1960 (U.S.)
