= We Had It All (song) =

1973 single by Waylon Jennings

Single by Waylon Jennings

from the album Honky Tonk Heroes
- B-side: "Do No Good Woman"
- Released: May 26, 1973
- Genre: Country
- Label: RCA Victor
- Songwriters: Troy Seals, Donnie Fritts
- Producer: Waylon Jennings

Waylon Jennings singles chronology
"You Can Have Her" (1973)	"We Had It All" (1973)	"You Ask Me To" (1973)

"We Had It All" is a song written by Troy Seals and Donnie Fritts and originally recorded by Waylon Jennings on his 1973 album, Honky Tonk Heroes. It has since been covered by many artists, including Rita Coolidge, Dobie Gray, Susan Jacks, Willie Nelson, Dolly Parton, The Rolling Stones, Bob Dylan, Rod Stewart, Tina Turner, Conway Twitty, Ray Charles, Scott Walker, Green On Red, and Dottie West.

== Chart performance ==
=== Waylon Jennings ===
Chart (1973)	Peak position
U.S. Billboard Hot Country Singles	28
Canadian RPM Country Tracks	17

=== Conway Twitty ===
Chart (1983)	Peak position
US Hot Country Songs (Billboard)	44

=== Dolly Parton ===
"We Had It All"

Single by Dolly Parton

from the album Think About Love
- B-side: "Do I Ever Cross Your Mind"
- Released: August 18, 1986
- Genre: Country
- Label: RCA Nashville
- Songwriters: Troy Seals, Donnie Fritts
- Producer: Val Garay

Dolly Parton singles chronology
"Tie Our Love (In a Double Knot)" (1986)	"We Had It All" (1986)	"To Know Him Is to Love Him" (1987)

Dolly Parton included the song on her 1984 album of covers The Great Pretender. A remixed version of the song was later included on 1986's Think About Love, and the remixed version was released as a single in the fall of 1986, just as Parton was leaving RCA (her label of the previous nineteen years). It would be her last charting single during her tenure with RCA.

Chart (1986)	Peak position
US Hot Country Songs (Billboard)	31
Canadian RPM Country Tracks	30
