= When Life Is Good Again =

Single by Dolly Parton
- Released: May 28, 2020
- Recorded: May 2020
- Genre: Country pop
- Length: 4:11
- Label: Butterfly
- Songwriter(s): Dolly Parton; Kent Wells
- Producer(s): Kent Wells

Dolly Parton singles chronology
| "Faith" (2019) | "When Life Is Good Again" (2020) | "Mary, Did You Know?" (2020) |

Music video
- "When Life Is Good Again" on YouTube

"When Life Is Good Again" is a song by American singer-songwriter Dolly Parton. It was released on May 28, 2020, by Butterfly Records. The song was written by Parton with Kent Wells who also produced the track.

== Background ==
Prior to the song's release, Parton launched a 10-week web-series titled Goodnight with Dolly, where she read bedtime stories to children. The book selections came from her Imagination Library, a non-profit book program she created to promote children's literacy. Parton also donated $1 million to Vanderbilt University Medical Center to aid in research toward a cure for the coronavirus. The song was premiered by Entertainment Weekly on May 27, 2020, and was released for digital download and streaming the following day.

== Composition ==
"When Life Is Good Again" was written by Dolly Parton and Kent Wells. It is a country pop song with a length of four minutes and eleven seconds. Lyrically, the song is a message regarding the aftermath of the coronavirus (COVID-19) pandemic. Parton addresses that she will prioritize her personal relationships, shares her appreciation for life, encourages listeners to open their hearts, and also reassures everything will one day be okay again.

== Critical reception ==
The song has received positive reviews from several publications. Melinda Lorge from Taste of Country described the song as "uplifting".

== Music video ==
The song's music video was directed by Steve Summers and was premiered on May 28, 2020, during the Time 100 Talks livestream, following an interview with Parton. The video begins with Parton sitting down next to a movie projector. As the song begins, Parton attempts to put in a filmstrip, eventually she starts playing one that was already loaded on the projector. As the film plays, Parton watches home-made videos featuring many families. As it progresses, the film features essential workers wearing masks. Near the end of video, multiple people in the film begin to remove their masks, including Parton and director Steve Summers. At the end of the video, Parton's mask is seen on the ground as she walks to her front door and opens it. The video closes with a message from Parton telling viewers to "be safe, be respectful, wear your mask, lead with love".

== Charts ==
| Chart (2020) | Peak position |
|---|---|
| US Country Digital Song Sales (Billboard) | 11 |
| US Digital Song Sales (Billboard) | 31 |

== Release history ==
| Country | Date | Format | Label |
|---|---|---|---|
| Various | May 28, 2020 | Digital download; streaming | Butterfly |
