= Joseph Sheppard =

American actor (born 1958)

Joseph Sheppard (born 1958, Houston, Texas) is an American actor. His first public appearance was in 1968 as a child guest on the Art Linkletter House Party television program.

Sheppard was graduated Verdugo Hills High School (1977( where he appeared in numerous plays. He was a member of the exclusive Los Angeles City College Theatre Department and Academy program (Associate of Arts in Theater, 1979).

Sheppard started the Roadshow Players traveling theater troupe. It entertained thousands of children in Southern California in the 1970s and 1980s.

In 1987 Sheppard was the Sysop of The Ledge PCBoard, a Bulletin Board System, and ran it for ten years. The Ledge became one of the most popular BBS systems in the pre-internet online world.

After his father's death in 1995, Sheppard left acting to manage SDC Convention Services. The company provides equipment and union labor for trade shows in the western United States.

He is a member of Electronic Frontier Foundation, American Federation of Television and Radio Artists, Actor's Equity, and Screen Actors Guild. He and his wife, the former Jane Sweet, have three children.
