= Those Memories of You =

Single by Dolly Parton, Linda Ronstadt and Emmylou Harris

from the album Trio
- B-side: "My Dear Companion"
- Released: August 31, 1987
- Genre: Country
- Length: 3:58
- Label: Warner Bros.
- Songwriter: Alan O'Bryant
- Producer: George Massenburg

Dolly Parton, Linda Ronstadt and Emmylou Harris singles chronology
"Telling Me Lies" (1987)	"Those Memories of You" (1987)	"Wildflowers" (1988)

"Those Memories of You" is a song written by Alan O'Bryant. It was first recorded by Bill and James Monroe in 1978 and later released as a single by Pam Tillis in 1986, whose version peaked at number 55 on the Billboard Hot Country Singles chart.

John Starling, formerly of the Seldom Scene, recorded the song on his solo album, Waitin' on a Southern Train, in 1982.

In 1987, the song was recorded by Dolly Parton, Linda Ronstadt, and Emmylou Harris on their album, Trio. Released in August of 1987, it was the album's third single. It reached number five on the Billboard Hot Country Singles chart in December and reached number one on the RPM Country Tracks chart in Canada.

A cover version by LeAnn Rimes was recorded for her second independent album under Nor Va Jak, From My Heart to Yours, released in 1992. The video for the song starred Harry Dean Stanton.

== Chart performance ==
Chart (1987)	Peak position
U.S. Billboard Hot Country Singles	5
Canadian RPM Country Tracks	1
