= The Best There Is (Dolly Parton album) =

Greatest hits album by Dolly Parton
- Released: 1987
- Recorded: Compilation
- Genres: Country; pop
- Label: RCA Victor

Dolly Parton chronology
Trio (1987)	The Best There Is (1987)	Best of Dolly Parton, Vol. 3 (1987)

The Best There Is was released in 1987 and is a compilation of Dolly Parton's major hits issued by RCA Records after she left the label. The compilation included some of her early 1970s country hits, as well as some of her later 1970s and early 1980s pop hits.

== Track listing ==
1. "9 to 5"
2. "Here You Come Again"
3. "Do I Ever Cross Your Mind"
4. "Think About Love"
5. "Coat of Many Colors"
6. "Jolene"
7. "I Will Always Love You"
8. "Appalachian Memories"
9. "But You Know I Love You"
