= Wildflowers (Dolly Parton song) =

Single by Dolly Parton, Linda Ronstadt and Emmylou Harris

from the album Trio
- B-side: "Hobo's Meditation"
- Released: March 7, 1988
- Recorded: 1986
- Genre: Country
- Length: 3:34
- Label: Warner Bros. 7-27970
- Songwriter: Dolly Parton
- Producer: George Massenburg

Dolly Parton, Linda Ronstadt and Emmylou Harris singles chronology
"Those Memories of You" (1987)	"Wildflowers" (1988)	"After the Goldrush" (1999)

"Wildflowers" is a song written by Dolly Parton, which was included on the Grammy-winning, multiple-platinum 1987 album Trio and recorded by Parton with Emmylou Harris and Linda Ronstadt. The original recording featured an autoharp, acoustic guitar (played by Harris), and fiddle, and was arranged to sound like an old-fashioned Appalachian folk song. It was the fourth single released from the Trio album, and reached number six on the Billboard Hot Country Singles and Tracks chart in July 1988.

In 2008, the recording was played at a reception by the Texas State Democratic Party, honoring former First Lady Lady Bird Johnson. Johnson's love of wildflowers was well known, and she had long championed the planting of them along the U.S. highways.

== Content ==
In the song, the narrator unfolds a metaphor for growing up as a wildflower in the fields among the "hills alive with wildflowers". Not content to "wither in place" beneath the sun, they run, "needing freedom to grow" and "fearing not where I'd go". In a "garden so different", they reflect, they "never belonged". Because a "flower [that] grows wild ... can always survive", they conclude, "Wildflowers don't care where they grow".

== Chart positions ==
Chart (1988)	Peak position
U.S. Billboard Hot Country Singles	6
Canadian RPM Country Tracks	8
