= Potential New Boyfriend =

Single by Dolly Parton

from the album Burlap & Satin
- B-side: "One of Those Days"
- Released: April 11, 1983
- Recorded: 1983
- Genre: Dance-pop; pop
- Length: 3:35; 3:15 (7" edit); 3:48 (new mix); 5:49 (long version)
- Label: RCA
- Songwriters: Steve Kipner, John Lewis Parker
- Producer: Greg Perry

Dolly Parton singles chronology
"Hard Candy Christmas" (1982)	"Potential New Boyfriend" (1983)	"Islands in the Stream" (1983)

"Potential New Boyfriend" is a song written by Steve Kipner and John Lewis Parker. It was first recorded by Australian singer Doug Parkinson, and released as a single in 1982 with the title "Better Keep Your Hands Off My (Potential New Girlfriend)". It peaked at number 97 on the Australian singles chart. It was subsequently recorded by American entertainer Dolly Parton, and her version peaked at number 20 on the U.S. country singles chart. It was released in April 1983 as the lead and only single from Parton's album Burlap & Satin. The song was also popular in discos and dance clubs, and in addition to the standard 45 RPM single, an extended-play dance remix single was released. The single was also accompanied by one of Parton's first music videos, which was directed by Steve Barron. The record is notable for being Parton's first song to be more successful on a non-country music US Billboard chart, peaking at number 13 on the Dance Club Chart and number 20 on the Hot Country Songs Chart.

== Chart performance ==
Chart (1983)	Peak position
Australia (Kent Music Report)	53
US Hot Country Songs (Billboard)	20
US Dance Club Songs (Billboard)	13
Canadian RPM Country Tracks	13
