= Rhinestone (film) =

1984 film by Bob Clark

- Theatrical release poster
- Directed by: Bob Clark
- Screenplay by: Phil Alden Robinson; Sylvester Stallone
- Story by: Phil Alden Robinson
- Based on: "Rhinestone Cowboy" by Larry Weiss
- Produced by: Howard Smith; Marvin Worth
- Starring: Sylvester Stallone; Dolly Parton; Richard Farnsworth; Ron Leibman
- Cinematography: Timothy Galfas
- Edited by: Stan Cole; John W. Wheeler
- Music by: Mike Post; Dolly Parton
- Production company: 20th Century Fox
- Distributed by: 20th Century Fox
- Release date: June 21, 1984
- Running time: 111 minutes
- Country: United States
- Language: English
- Budget: $28 million
- Box office: $21.4 million

Rhinestone is a 1984 American musical romantic comedy film directed by Bob Clark from a screenplay by Sylvester Stallone and Phil Alden Robinson and starring Stallone, Dolly Parton, Richard Farnsworth and Ron Leibman. It is based on the 1975 hit song "Rhinestone Cowboy" written by Larry Weiss. Although a critical and financial failure, the film spawned two top 10 country hits for Parton on the Billboard Hot Country Songs chart.

== Plot ==
Jake Farris is a down home country singer from Tennessee stuck in a long-term contract performing at "The Rhinestone", a sleazy country music nightclub in New York City. Jake boasts to the club's manager, Freddie Ugo, that she can make anybody into a country sensation, insisting that she can turn any normal guy into a country singer in just two weeks. Freddie accepts Jake's bet, putting up the remainder of Jake's contract (if she wins the bet, the contract becomes void; if she loses, another five years will be added). He then ups the ante: if Jake loses, she must also have sex with him.

The problem is that Freddie can select the man, and he selects an obnoxious New York City cabbie named Nick Martinelli. Nick not only has no musical talent whatsoever; he claims to hate country music "worse than liver". Realizing that she is stuck with Nick, she takes him back to her hometown of Leiper's Fork, Tennessee to teach him how to walk, talk and behave like a real country star. While there, he has to put up with Jake's constant nagging and berating him about his behavior; the culture shock of not knowing anything about the South; and Jake's ex-fiancé, Barnett Kale, who befriends Nick, then turns on him when he realizes that he and Jake have developed feelings for one another.

It all leads to Nick performing a song at The Rhinestone where the crowd is a crazed group of hecklers and are "out for blood." After Nick's first attempt to sing bombs, he turns to the band and says, "Okay guys, let's pick up the beat" and the band begins playing the song in a more rock n' roll version and he wins the crowd over. In the end, Jake gets her contract back and she and Nick begin to sing another song with the implication that they will continue their budding relationship together.

== Cast ==
- Sylvester Stallone as Nick Martinelli
- Dolly Parton as Jake Farris
- Richard Farnsworth as Noah Farris
- Ron Leibman as Freddie Ugo
- Tim Thomerson as Barnett Kale
- Stephen Apostle Pec as Mr. Martinelli
- Penny Santon as Mrs. Martinelli
- Russell Buchanan as Elgart
- Ritch Brinkley as Luke
- Jerry Potter as Walt
- Jesse Welles as Billie Joe
- Phil Rubenstein as Maurie
- Tony Munafo as Tony
- Don Hanmer as Sid
- Speck Rhodes as Mr. Polk
- Guy Fitch as Wino
- Cindy Perlman as Esther Jean
- Troy Evans as Bettor
- Paul Garner as Rhinestone Heckler
- Joseph Sheppard as Cut 'N Slice Heckler
- Randy Parton as Cut 'N Slice Band Singer
- Mike Baird as Rhinestone Drummer
- Joey Scarbury as Rhinestone Band Singer
- Leland Sklar as Rhinestone Bassist

== Production ==
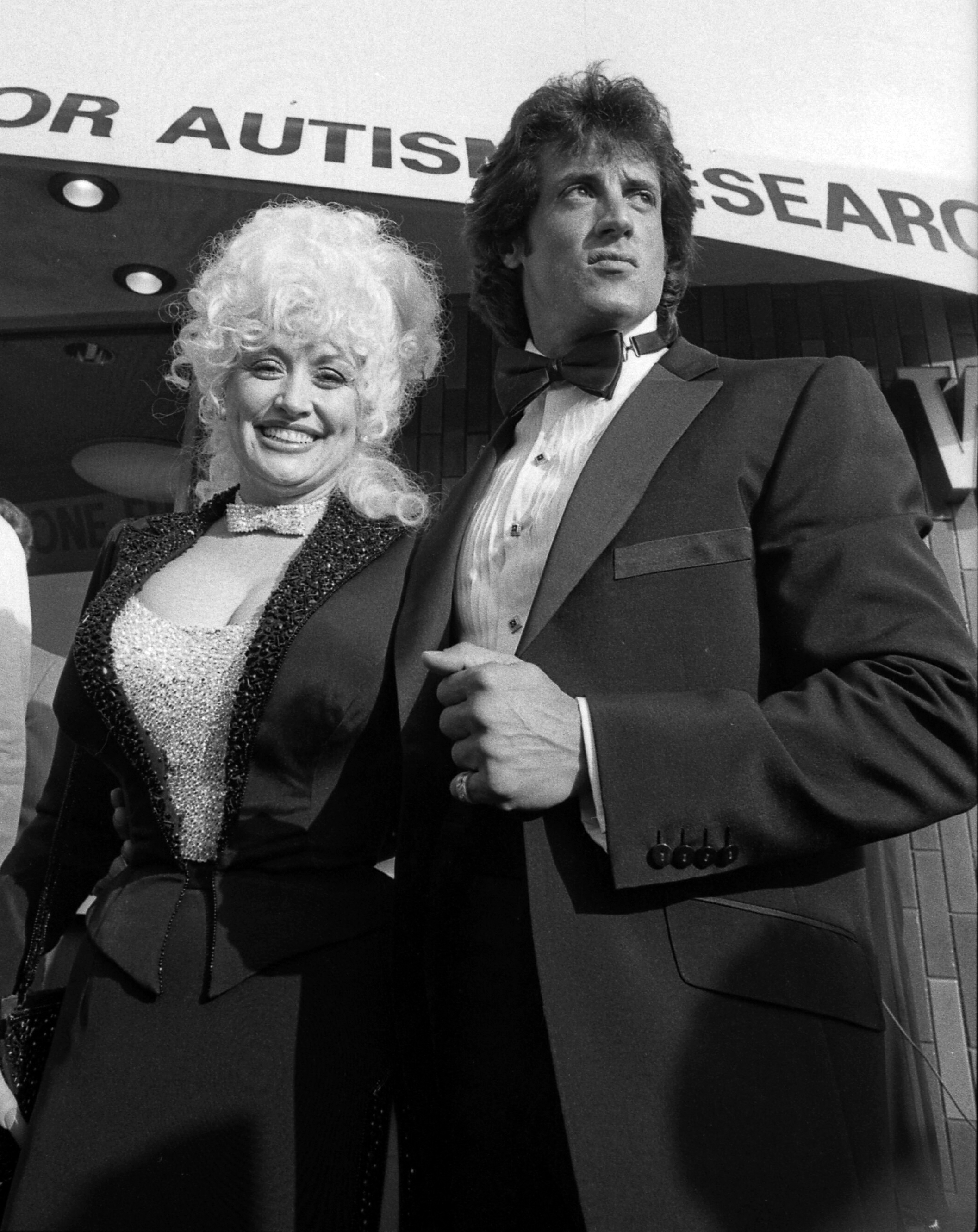
Parton and Stallone at a benefit showing of the film

=== Development and writing ===
Sylvester Stallone reportedly turned down Romancing the Stone (1984) to make Rhinestone. He was paid $5 million and a percentage of the gross. Executives at both Fox and Paramount expressed interest. Paramount's interest evaporated after president Michael Eisner reviewed the project and liked it but not enough to get into a bidding war with another studio. Fox production chief, Sherry Lansing, was enthusiastic enough to buy it out of turnaround from Embassy for about $60,000, telling screenwriter Phil Alden Robinson that it was the best love story and the best comedy they had read in years. They loved the dialogue and talked of offering Robinson an overall deal in which he would write, direct and produce future projects.

However, when Sherry Lansing departed Fox, her successor, Joe Wizan, reviewed all projects in development. Wizan felt the Rhinestone script could not move forward unless they could get major stars for it. He and several Fox executives reviewed the list of actors who could co-star with Dolly Parton. They were concerned that they find someone who could be believable as a New York cab driver and have enough charisma that he would not be blown off the screen by the presence of Parton—who, some Fox executives thought, had done just that to Burt Reynolds in The Best Little Whorehouse in Texas (1982). Mike Ovitz, whose talent firm, Creative Artists Agency, represented Parton (and Stallone) intervened, and insisted Fox take one of its male stars if they wanted Parton; CAA advocated for Stallone. According to one insider, CAA said, “‘If you want her, you better take him,’” and “that was the end of discussions of whether anyone else could be obtained for the part.” Stallone's agents at CAA had been positioning him to direct Rhinestone himself. When Stallone declined to pursue the position, it was decided to let him direct the picture in fact, even though Don Zimmerman would be the director of record. But Zimmerman was never let in on the secret. He thought he was the one and only director.

Sylvester Stallone was tentatively set to do a film for Paramount before beginning production on Rhinestone for Fox. The Paramount producers, Don Simpson and Jerry Bruckheimer, were encountering the same problems as their Fox counterparts, after offering Stallone the lead in Beverly Hills Cop, Stallone told the Paramount executives he wanted to make a few changes and then proceeded to rewrite the script. Simpson and Bruckheimer, with more experience producing big-budget, high concept projects, than the executives at Fox, responded by saying that they did not want to film the script as rewritten and promptly exited talks with Stallone and his representatives. When the Paramount film fell through, the start date for Rhinestone was moved up. The original four or five months of preparatory planning were reduced to two and a half. To complicate matters further, Stallone decided that the script needed to be rewritten.

When Fox bought his script, they initially told Robinson it was their intent that he do any rewrites, if needed; but they were sincere from the outset, making Robinson aware they could not promise this. A meeting was scheduled by the studio for Stallone and Robinson to discuss script changes. The studio wanted Stallone to supervise Robinson in the rewrite. But the morning of the meeting Robinson was disinvited. Stallone wanted to rewrite the script himself. According to Robinson, Stallone did two drafts, one worse than the other. Stallone had, in a few short weeks, thrown out what had taken Robinson a year to write. Stallone changed the attitude of his character Nick Martinelli, making him more streetwise and less vulnerable.

"Stallone’s script read very much like a first draft," according to one observer. “You didn’t sense a lot of work went into the choices. There had been a lot of texture in the screenplay, a lot of charm, and the characters were very well defined and they went through carefully plotted-out progressions of character change. All that was gone.” The original script worked hard to keep out clichés. Stallone added them.

Fox executives agreed that Stallone's changes by and large hurt the script. With seven weeks to go before the start of principal photography, the studio said they would not make the movie on the basis of the revised script. Robinson was brought back in and asked to “restore the charm” of the original, and “put those great characters back,” without changing any of the dialogue Sylvester Stallone had written for himself. Robinson objected, telling Fox executive Wizan that what was wrong with the script was the awful dialogue. Wizan replied: “Welcome to Hollywood.” Robinson reluctantly agreed to the studio’s restrictions on the rewrite. He says he was able to solve some structural problems and tried to make sense of Stallone’s changes. When he turned it in, the studio said the new script was great, and one executive vowed that Stallone was either going to do it as written or walk. When they showed the changes to Stallone he said, “Fine, fine. I just have a few changes to make.” Stallone then proceeded to restore most of his changes. The studio was not happy with Stallone’s new revisions. Robinson’s original Rhinestone script was a small movie about a strong-willed Southern woman determined to own a restaurant in Manhattan. By the time Stallone's revisions were completed, it had become the story of a New York cab driver's miraculous victory in a country western singing contest, a contest that parlayed Parton's character Jake Farris into going to bed with her sleazy boss Freddie Ugo (Ron Leibman) should they lose the contest.

“CAA pretty much took over [the film],” says one insider. “And one of the reasons that they were able to take over was that Twentieth Century Fox at that time was run by people who weren’t strong filmmakers. They had people who were not experienced in making movies. They had marketing directors, story editors and ex-agents, but they didn’t have filmmakers running the place.” By turning the project over to Stallone they were giving the movie to someone who had written and directed. And they knew that if things didn’t turn out well, they could always lay the blame on Stallone.

When the film started shooting, production problems immediately arose. Zimmerman thought he was the director. But Stallone told him what to do, ad-libbed scenes and made changes as he saw fit. By everyone's reckoning, including Stallone's, the first few weeks were a disaster. Tensions were exacerbated when Stallone and Zimmerman got into a dispute over the cameraman. Stallone was unhappy with the look of the movie. Zimmerman thought the cameraman was doing a wonderful job and loyally stuck by him. Stallone forced the cameraman out, and after that, says Zimmerman, their relationship quickly deteriorated.

Three weeks into production, Zimmerman was fired. His contract was settled and the production shut down while the studio sought a new director. CAA proposed that Fox hire Bob Clark, who had directed the hit film Porky's, which Fox had distributed—contrary to Stallone's later statements, director Mike Nichols was never considered for, much less affiliated, with Rhinestone. Nichols was still very loyal to his agent Sam Cohn, with ICM, throughout the 1980s; and CAA oversaw principle talent (package) acquisitions on Rhinestone, during this time. Since the new director had to be acceptable to Sylvester Stallone, it did not hurt that both were represented by CAA. Clark reportedly received $1 million to direct, plus a guaranteed fee for his next project at Fox, whether or not it was ever produced. That project is reputed to have been previously rejected by the studio. The first three weeks of filming were thrown out (all footage directed by Zimmerman, including location work in New York City and Nashville). Knowing his reputation for problem sets, Stallone was anxious not to be cast as the villain in this production switch so he told a reporter that the change had been made because studio executives were panicked when the film fell behind schedule.

After a shutdown of one week, and now under Clark's direction, the production continued filming in Tennessee before relocating to Los Angeles, California, “to start from scratch;” After Stallone insisted the weather in Tennessee was too cold, which would later result in continuity problems. The production planned to use the San Fernando Valley for reshoots. Stallone continued to rewrite the script as production proceeded. Robinson says that when Clark was hired, it was with the strong understanding that no one could touch the script except Stallone. If Clark wanted any changes, he had to go to Stallone. Among other revisions, Stallone made his role larger than Dolly Parton's, a reversal of the original script, in which her character dominated. If Parton objected to the change, she never raised a fuss. By all accounts she was a joy to work with. Zimmerman says Stallone continued to do whatever he wanted, despite Fox's hopes that the new director would be able to control him.

Original screenwriter Robinson was so offended by Stallone's reworking of his original screenplay that he briefly considered having his name removed from the film's credits. He was later convinced that having his name on a film of this "caliber" would look good on his resume.

In 2006 Stallone said:

The most fun I ever had on a movie was with Dolly Parton on Rhinestone. I must tell everyone right now that originally the director was supposed to be Mike Nichols, that was the intention and it was supposed to be shot in New York, down and dirty with Dolly and I with gutsy mannerisms performed like two antagonists brought together by fate. I wanted the music at that time to be written by people who would give it sort of a bizarre edge. Believe it or not, I contacted Whitesnake's management and they were ready to write some very interesting songs alongside Dolly's. But, I was asked to come down to Fox and out steps the director, Bob Clark. Bob is a nice guy, but the film went in a direction that literally shattered my internal corn meter into smithereens. I would have done many things differently. I certainly would've steered clear of comedy unless it was dark, Belgian chocolate dark. Silly comedy didn't work for me. I mean, would anybody pay to see John Wayne in a whimsical farce? Not likely. I would stay more true to who I am and what the audience would prefer rather than trying to stretch out and waste a lot of time and people's patience.

Stallone said he regrets making the film.

== Reception ==
=== Critical response ===
The film was panned upon its release, and is generally regarded as a commercial and critical flop. On Rotten Tomatoes, the film has an approval rating of 19% based on reviews from 16 critics. On Metacritic the film has a weighted average score of 36 out of 100, based on 9 critics, indicating "generally unfavorable reviews". Nonetheless, the soundtrack album gave Dolly Parton two top ten country singles: "Tennessee Homesick Blues" and "God Won't Get You".

Variety magazine wrote: "Effortlessly living up to its title, Rhinestone is as artificial and synthetic a concoction as has ever made its way to the screen."

Phil Alden Robinson publicly distanced himself from the film during its release. Robinson took the highly unusual step of mounting his own publicity campaign, criticizing the movie, saying that the humor and intelligence of the original script had been replaced with vulgarity, caricature and farce. Disassociating himself from the picture, he sent letters to film critics explaining what had happened to his script. It was, he said, a textbook example of a studio willingly sacrificing the quality of a script for what was perceived as the marketability of star casting.

"I thought a long time before speaking out," Robinson says. "Of course the conventional wisdom is that you don't open your mouth. But I was having a hard time living with that. I wrote letters and I gave interviews and I did a lot of press. I couldn’t do nothing. I mean, I was doing nothing and I couldn’t keep doing that. I would rather take the heat for saying what I believe and for telling the truth than to just let the industry know you can do this to me. And so I did a lot of press and got no heat. Stallone called my agent and was furious but that was it. People at studios, even at Fox, called to say we’re glad you did that and it’s about time somebody said these things. Writers, of course, were thrilled. I actually got calls from people who worked on the movie, from agents, and who were allied with Stallone, saying, we’re glad you did that, we can’t say this to Sly, but you’re right."

In her 1994 autobiography Dolly: My Life and Other Unfinished Business, Parton said of the film “I guess the public didn’t want to see Sylvester Stallone do comedy – or see me do Sylvester Stallone."

=== Accolades ===
| Award | Category | Nominee(s) | Result |
|---|---|---|---|
| Academy of Country Music Awards | Tex Ritter Award | Rhinestone | Nominated |
| Golden Raspberry Awards (1984) | Worst Picture | Howard Smith and Marvin Worth | Nominated |
| Golden Raspberry Awards (1984) | Worst Director | Bob Clark | Nominated |
| Golden Raspberry Awards (1984) | Worst Actor | Sylvester Stallone | Won |
| Golden Raspberry Awards (1984) | Worst Supporting Actor | Ron Leibman | Nominated |
| Golden Raspberry Awards (1984) | Worst Screenplay | Screenplay by Phil Alden Robinson and Sylvester Stallone; Story by Phil Alden Robinson | Nominated |
| Golden Raspberry Awards (1984) | Worst Musical Score | Original Music and Lyrics by Dolly Parton; Music Adapted and Conducted by Mike Post | Nominated |
| Golden Raspberry Awards (1984) | Worst Original Song | "Drinkenstein"; Music and Lyrics by Dolly Parton | Won |
| Golden Raspberry Awards (1984) | Worst Original Song | "Sweet Lovin' Friends"; Music and Lyrics by Dolly Parton | Nominated |
| Golden Raspberry Awards (2004) | Worst "Musical" of Our First 25 Years | Rhinestone | Nominated |
| Stinkers Bad Movie Awards | Worst Picture | Howard Smith and Marvin Worth | Nominated |
