= Real Love (Dolly Parton album) =

Studio album by Dolly Parton
- Released: January 21, 1985
- Recorded: October–November 1984
- Studio: Rumbo (Canoga Park)
- Genres: Country; pop; synth-pop
- Length: 35:18
- Label: RCA Victor
- Producer: David Malloy

Dolly Parton chronology
| Once Upon a Christmas (1984) | Real Love (1985) | Collector's Series (1985) |

Singles from Real Love
- 1. "Don't Call It Love" Released: January 7, 1985; 2. "Real Love" Released: April 29, 1985; 3. "Think About Love" Released: November 11, 1985; 4. "Tie Our Love (In a Double Knot)" Released: April 7, 1986

Professional ratings
Review scores
| Source | Rating |
|---|---|
| AllMusic | 3/5 stars |
| The Encyclopedia of Popular Music | 3/5 stars |

Real Love is the twenty-seventh solo studio album by American singer-songwriter Dolly Parton. It was released on January 21, 1985, by RCA Records. The album was produced by David Malloy, and would be Parton's last studio album for RCA Records. It includes two number-one country singles, "Real Love" (a duet with Kenny Rogers) and "Think About Love". The album's other singles, "Don't Call It Love" and "Tie Our Love (In a Double Knot)", peaked at number three and number 17, respectively.

The album was released on LP, 8-track, cassette, and CD in 1985, but went out of print during the early 1990s. It was reissued for the first time during Parton's European tour in 2007 by BMG Germany as part of a two-fer CD, paired with 1983's Burlap & Satin.

== Track listing ==
| No. | Title | Writer(s) | Length |
|---|---|---|---|
| 1. | "Think About Love" | Richard "Spady" Brannan, Tom Campbell | 3:26 |
| 2. | "Tie Our Love (In a Double Knot)" | Jeff Silbar, John Reid | 3:27 |
| 3. | "We Got Too Much" | Dolly Parton | 3:16 |
| 4. | "It's Such a Heartache" | Even Stevens, Hillary Kanter | 3:25 |
| 5. | "Don't Call It Love" | Dean Pitchford, Tom Snow | 3:16 |
| 6. | "Real Love" (duet with Kenny Rogers) | David Malloy, Richard "Spady" Brannon, Randy McCormick | 3:54 |
| 7. | "I Can't Be True" | Parton | 3:18 |
| 8. | "Once in a Very Blue Moon" | Pat Alger, Gene Levine | 3:45 |
| 9. | "Come Back to Me" | Parton | 3:36 |
| 10. | "I Hope You're Never Happy" | Parton | 3:55 |
| Total length: | | | 35:18 |

== Personnel ==
- Dolly Parton - vocals
- Kenny Rogers - vocals
- Billy Joe Walker Jr., Dean Parks - guitar
- Bob Glaub - bass
- Paul Leim - drums
- Bobbye Hall, Lenny Castro - percussion
- Randy McCormick, Steve Goldstein - keyboards, string arrangements
- Tom Scott - saxophone
- Gene Morford, Jennifer Kimball, Richard Marx, Terry Williams - backing vocals

== Charts ==
Album

| Chart (1985) | Peak position |
|---|---|
| US Top Country Albums (Billboard) | 9 |
| Swedish Albums (Sverigetopplistan) | 30 |
| US Cashbox Country Albums | 5 |

Album (Year-End)

| Chart (1985) | Peak Position |

Singles

| Title | Year | Peak chart positions | | | | | |
| Title | Year | US | US AC | US Country | CAN AC | CAN Country | AUS |
|---|---|---|---|---|---|---|---|
| "Don't Call It Love" | 1985 | — | 12 | 3 | 15 | 5 | — |
| "Real Love" (duet with Kenny Rogers) | 1985 | 91 | 13 | 1 | 19 | 1 | 45 |
| "Think About Love" | 1985 | — | — | 1 | — | 1 | 74 |
| "Tie Our Love (In a Double Knot)" | 1986 | — | — | 17 | — | 20 | — |
