= Real Love (Dolly Parton and Kenny Rogers song) =

Single by Dolly Parton and Kenny Rogers

from the album Real Love
- B-side: "I Can't Be True"
- Released: April 29, 1985
- Genre: Country pop
- Length: 3:49
- Label: RCA
- Songwriter(s): David Malloy, Richard "Spady" Brannon and Randy McCormick
- Producer(s): David Malloy

Dolly Parton singles chronology
| "Don't Call It Love" (1985) | "Real Love" (1985) | "Think About Love" (1985) |

Kenny Rogers singles chronology
| "Love Is What We Make It" (1985) | "Real Love" (1985) | "Morning Desire" (1985) |

"Real Love" is a song written by David Malloy, Richard "Spady" Brannon and Randy McCormick, and recorded as a duet by American entertainers Dolly Parton and Kenny Rogers that topped the US country singles chart in August 1985. It was released in April 1985 the second single and title track from Parton's Real Love album. Released after the top-ten success of "Don't Call It Love", the song became Parton and Rogers' second country chart-topper as a duet act. However, "Real Love" did not fare as well on the pop singles charts as 1983's "Islands in the Stream" had done, stalling at number 91 on the Billboard Hot 100 and number 13 on the Adult Contemporary chart.

Unlike "Islands in the Stream", "Real Love" was not composed by the Bee Gees, who had composed and produced Rogers' 1983 chart-topping album Eyes That See in the Dark. That album also included another four of Rogers' hit singles from 1983 and 1984, namely "Buried Treasure", "This Woman", "Midsummer Nights" and "Evening Star".

Parton and Rogers embarked on a nine-city US concert tour in February 1985, from which an HBO concert special, "Real Love" was filmed; a music video for the "Real Love" single was produced using footage from the HBO special.

Parton also recorded a solo version in November 1984, which was later included on the 1995 album I Will Always Love You: The Essential Dolly Parton One.

== Chart positions ==
Chart performance for "Real Love"
| Chart (1985) | Peak position |
|---|---|
| Australia (Kent Music Report) | 45 |
| Canadian RPM Adult Contemporary Tracks | 19 |
| Canadian RPM Country Tracks | 1 |
| US Billboard Hot 100 | 91 |
| US Adult Contemporary (Billboard) | 13 |
| US Hot Country Songs (Billboard) | 1 |
