= Burlap & Satin =

Studio album by Dolly Parton
- Released: May 2, 1983
- Recorded: c. February 1983
- Studios: Soundshop (Nashville); The Castle (Franklin); Record Plant (Los Angeles)
- Genres: Country; pop
- Length: 36:58
- Label: RCA Victor
- Producers: Dolly Parton, Gregg Perry

Dolly Parton chronology
The Winning Hand (1982)	Burlap & Satin (1983)	The Great Pretender (1984)

Singles from Burlap & Satin
- 1. "Potential New Boyfriend" Released: April 11, 1983

Burlap & Satin is the twenty-fifth solo studio album by American entertainer Dolly Parton. It was released on May 2, 1983, by RCA Records. The album straddled the line between pop and country sounds. Consisting mostly of Parton's own compositions, two tracks were outtakes from the film Best Little Whorehouse in Texas: "A Cowboy's Ways" (a song intended for co-star Burt Reynolds to perform in the film that was ultimately cut from it) and "A Gamble Either Way". The album's single, "Potential New Boyfriend" was a top 20 country single and was accompanied by Parton's first ever music video. Willie Nelson duetted on a cover of the Eddy Arnold hit "I Really Don't Want to Know". The track "Ooo-eee" was recorded by Nicolette Larson on her 1980 album "Radioland" and features backing vocals from Linda Ronstadt.

As part of Parton's 2007 European tour, the album was re-released for the first time on CD by BMG Germany (a division of Sony/BMG) in a two-fer CD. It was paired with 1985's Real Love.

== Critical reception ==
Professional ratings
Review scores
Source	Rating
AllMusic	2.5/5 stars
The Encyclopedia of Popular Music	2/5 stars

Billboard gave a positive review of the album, calling it "Parton's most satisfying album in a long time." The review said the album was "well-titled...because [Parton] glides silkily between pop (which she handles like a trouper) and the kind of country on which her superstar career was formulated." They praised the inclusion of six Parton originals because "no one sings Parton better than Parton." The review also praised Perry's arrangements, calling them "beautiful and classy, contemporary but soulful, exactly right for Parton's shivering vibrato." The review concluded by saying that the album "will rank among Dolly's best yet."

Cashbox also gave a positive review, praising Parton's ability of "moving freely between folksy country, gospel, and danceable pop." The review said that the six Parton-penned songs are "clearly the strongest pieces in the collection, while the other four cuts provide the most interesting production elements." The review also interpreted the album title, artwork, and material selection as Parton "attempting to lump both her small-town country girl sensibilities and bigger-than-life celebrity status together...denoting her ability to reach a wide and varied audience."

== Track listing ==
All tracks are written by Dolly Parton except as noted.

No.	Title	Writer(s)	Length
1.	"Ooo-eee"	Annie McLoone	3:38
2.	"Send Me the Pillow That You Dream On"	Hank Locklin	3:10
3.	"Jealous Heart"		3:25
4.	"A Gamble Either Way"		3:34
5.	"Appalachian Memories"		4:15
6.	"I Really Don't Want to Know" (with Willie Nelson)	Howard Barnes, Don Robertson	3:02
7.	"Potential New Boyfriend"	Steve Kipner, John Lewis Parker	3:39
8.	"A Cowboy's Ways"		4:17
9.	"One of Those Days"		3:59
10.	"Calm on the Water"		3:59
Total length:			36:58

== Personnel ==
=== Musicians ===
- Dolly Parton – vocals
- Eddy Anderson, Rick Marotta – drums
- Eddy Anderson – percussion
- Anita Ball, Dolly Parton, Ernie Winfrey, Judy Ogle, Judy Rodman – handclaps
- Leland Sklar, Michael Rhodes, Tommy Cogbill – bass
- Gregg Perry, Mitch Humphries, Robbie Buchanan, Ron Oates, Dolly Parton – keyboards
- Ron Oates – synthesizers
- Hugh McCracken, Marty Walsh, Michael Severs, Pete Bordonali, Tom Rutledge – guitar
- Joe McGuffee – steel guitar
- Denis Solee – saxophone, flute
- Dewayne Pigg – French horn
- Nashville String Machine – strings
- Anita Ball, Donna McElroy, Judy Rodman, Karen Taylor-Good, Lea Jane Berinati, Lisa Silver, Michael Black, Ray Walker, Richard Dennison – backing vocals

=== Production ===
- Arranged and produced by Dolly Parton and Gregg Perry
- Recorded and engineered by Ernie Winfrey and Phil Jamtaas
- Assistant engineers: Fran Overall, Jim Scott
- Mixed by Ernie Winfrey

== Charts ==
Weekly charts

Chart (1983)	Peak position
US Billboard 200	127
US Top Country Albums (Billboard)	5
US Cashbox Country Albums	2
US Cash Box Top Albums	146

Year-end charts

Chart (1983)	Position
US Top Country Albums (Billboard)	43
