= Faith (Galantis and Dolly Parton song) =

Single by Galantis and Dolly Parton featuring Mr. Probz

from the album Church
- Released: 25 October 2019
- Studio: Dolly Parton vocals: Nashville, Tennessee, US
- Genre: EDM; dance-pop
- Length: 3:06
- Label: Big Beat; Atlantic
- Songwriters: Christian Karlsson; Linus Eklow; Henrik Jonback; Jazelle Rodriguez; Samuel James; David Saint Fleur; Dolly Parton; Jan Postma; Dennis Stehr; John Hiatt
- Producers: Galantis; Jonback; Saint Fleur; Eric Aukstikalnis; Bali Bandits

Galantis singles chronology
"Holy Water" (2019)	"Faith" (2019)	"The Lake" (2020)

Dolly Parton singles chronology
"There Was Jesus" (2019)	"Faith" (2019)	"When Life Is Good Again" (2020)

Mr. Probz singles chronology
"Praying to a God" (2018)	"Faith" (2019)

Music video
- "Faith" on YouTube

"Faith" is a song by Swedish duo Galantis and American singer-songwriter Dolly Parton featuring Dutch singer-songwriter Mr. Probz, from Galantis' third studio album Church, which was released in early 2020. The song was released on 25 October 2019, through Big Beat and Atlantic Records. It is a remake of John Hiatt's 1987 song "Have a Little Faith in Me".

== Background ==
The song was co-written by Samuel James, who co-wrote the closing single on the movie Abominable, sung by Bebe Rexha, and produced by Worcester natives David Saint Fleur and Eric Aukstikalnis. Samuel James said the song began by taking John Hiatt's song, "Have a Little Faith in Me", and rewriting the verse, lyrics and melody. He said: "Almost all the credit on this record goes to David Saint Fleur. David has this crazy idea, what did we took this song, and flipped it and made a dance track." James said Saint Fleur showed it to the members of Galantis, who loved it and wanted to record it. According to James, Saint Fleur also wanted to approach Parton. At the beginning, no one thought she would work on this plan, but Saint Fleur insisted, and finally was able to play it for her. Samuel James noted that "she fell in love with it". "It's so unbelievable. That's the fun thing about music, you know, sometimes that can happen", he added. According to him, the song has evolved greatly from the original recorded version, and that while he was originally singing on it, his only vocal presence on the final product is that he's singing uncredited on the chorus, and that his voice is unrecognizable. "This song has been such a journey. There's an orchestra from the Netherlands. A five-piece orchestra. I'm psyched for people to hear it. John Hiatt gave his blessing, and he's tough!", he said.

Dolly Parton explained the genesis of the song seen from her side: "I was on the phone with a Christian, talking about a song called "Faith" and an album called Church. I knew I was in the right place." According to Rolling Stone, she added: "As soon as I heard it, I thought, 'Yes! This is a song that the world needs right now. [...] It's all about uplifting mankind and believing in a higher power. All the things we need in this dark, ol' dreary world right now." After making an expectedly long-shot call to the singer, and as soon as she said yes to the song, Karlsson immediately flew to Nashville, United States, to record her vocals. She later commented on the lyrics: "I 'Dolly-ized' it a bit and wrote some more spiritual things inside". Meanwhile, Mr Probz recorded his verse separately. Parton said: "We talked back-and-forth and patted each other on the back from afar".

On 12 October 2019, she first made hints about the track during a press conference at the Grand Ole Opry, where she was celebrating 50 years as a member. When asked about upcoming songs, she name-dropped two Christian acts before revealing her feature with Galantis. She said:

I have a song out now with a Christian group out of Australia. They are called for King & Country and the song is called "God Only Knows". And then I've got a new single coming out right after the first of the year with Zach Williams, who is one of the new Christian artists called "There Was Jesus". I have another song that's going to drop right away, a few days before the CMAs, and it is called "Faith". It's a great old song. I have that one out with a group called Galantis which I'm singing with a guy named Mr. Probz. This world is just so dark and ugly and awful... so I'm going to make it my business to try to do songs that are more uplifting, not all Christian-based songs, but songs about better things. Do better, and have a little more love, a little more light and don't be so dark and dirty.

— Dolly Parton, during a press conference at the Grand Ole Opry on 12 October 2019,

Then, Galantis announced the release of the song via their social media on 16 October. They invited their fans to pre-save it by leading a link on their post. After this date, Mr Probz has repeatedly mentioned Dolly Parton in his interviews. In his day, he saw the singer more in her films rather than through her songs, because country music was just not often played on Dutch radio and TV.

A few days before the release, Galantis appeared on The World's Biggest Dance Show, hosted by BBC Radio 1 and syndicated across seven countries, to tease "Faith" to an audience of over 18 million listeners. Then, they posted on 22 October via their social media a teaser, again encouraging fans to pre-save the single. Once the song was released, they made it clear that they were proud of the fact that it turned out to be a true collaborative experience. Linus Eklöw, the other half of Galantis, led via e-mail the following message: "[Parton] has always been one of our dream collaborators, but we honestly thought getting her on the song was a total longshot". The duo also said: "It's important for us to have meaning behind our music. Our album Church doesn't necessarily refer to a building or specific religion, but instead to people banded together in similar belief for a better humanity. Whether it's advocating peace, change, or just lifting each other up - that is our "Faith" and Church."

According to Dolly Parton, this collaboration came in "divine order" for her. It's not her first foray into electronic music (as she has charted Billboard's Disco (and its successor Dance Club Songs) Chart, dating back to 1979), after hearing dance remixes of her songs, such as "Peace Train" and "Baby I'm Burnin'". After "Faith", the singer affirmed, confessing to Rolling Stone, that she wouldn't be opposed to make more dance music songs: "I always know inside myself what's right and what's wrong to do, and this felt really right. [...] I'm open to doing more with them and continue with this — if this does well."

Concerning its commercial performance, and according to Nielsen Music, "Faith" earned 4,000 downloads and 1.8 million streams in the US during the first week succeeding its release. It also entered at the end of this week the US Dance/Electronic Digital Songs chart as No. 1, which was a first for Dolly Parton. At Billboard’s Dance/Mix Show Airplay, the song reached number 1 in its 21 December 2019 issue, giving Parton her first number one on this chart, as well as the fifth top ten and first number one for Galantis and the third top ten and second number one for Probz.

The singer also performed the song in a gospel medley at the Country Music Association Awards in Nashville, on 13 November 2019.

== Critical reception ==
The song has received positive reviews from several publications. Many of them deemed "Faith" an EDM song. Effectively, Cillea Houghton of American country radio KEAN-FM called the single "an EDM production" and "a feel-good jam made for the club with its infectious techno-style beat" and with "Parton's voice [which] still shines even with autotune on lyrics that make her a loyal and encouraging companion as she sings [her chorus]". Annie Reuter of Billboard called the song a "dance-ready track" with the presence of "thumping beats and hand-clapped rhythms [which] replace the piano for a sing-along earworm". She also wrote that "Parton [put] her own interpretation on the track, [transforming] the original piano ballad into a club jam with the help of Swedish EDM duo Galantis and Dutch rapper Mr. Probz". Kat Bein of the same publication deemed the song "an uplifting dance-pop gem" which shows "a soaring [Dolly Parton] performance with just a taste of country twang", featuring "Galantis' sonic hallmarks, [namely] a glittery production, booming vocals and a sky-high chorus". Dancing Astronaut staff described the song as "a tailor-made for the airwaves, and a fun step outside the norm for Parton". Concerning the composition, they considered the track as "a moodlifter, with Galantis employing a mélange of cheery chord progressions and rich basslines over a mid-tempo foundation". They noted the presence of "flecks of woodwind and violin [which] tie the atmosphere together, making for an ideal complement to the balanced tones of their A-list collaborator and Dutch vocal sensation Mr. Probz". Mike Wass of Idolator noted the song "an [sic?] euphoric anthem", which is "the clubland 2019 with a splash of twang and gospel, transforming it into something new entirely. DJ Mag Latinoamérica described the final product as "the typical mood lifter that producers usually bring, with cheerful progressions and energizing bass lines, combining the voice of the legendary country music singer and the talented Dutchman Mr. Probz". Writing for Your EDM, Matthew Meadow deemed the single "a perfect, feel-good tune that fits [Galantis] style perfectly". He added that "the little vocal embellishments atop the cheery synths make [the track] one of the brightest songs that the Swedish duo have ever released". John Cameron of EDM.com described the song as "an upbeat tune" which "falls somewhere into the tropical house category, with an infectious bounce that makes it undeniably danceable". Chris DeVille of Stereogum noted that it "sounds like no other Dolly Parton song in history" and described her vocals as "sometimes processed beyond recognition", deemed as "hyper-processed and streaked with neon". He also remarked the presence of "a gospel choir" in the song. BroadwayWorld TV News Desk described "Faith" as "an uplifting call for unity and hope set to signature Galantis production". Writing for the daily newspaper Knoxville News Sentinel, Kelli L. Krebs deemed the song "an epic [and] dance-floor anthem".

== Music video ==
A still from the original music video for "Faith": Dolly Parton dancing with the passengers in the bus

The official music video of the song was released through Galantis' YouTube channel. Directed by Dano Cerny, and shot in Franklin, United States, it shows Dolly Parton driving a bus that suddenly breaks down. Parton encourages discouraged passengers not to give up and, little by little, when the song starts again in the first verse of Mr Probz, they begin to listen the advice of the singer. They dance in the bus, but also outside it, in the street, at about 1:40 in. Then Parton delivers her couplet from the driver's seat while Galantis dominates the crowd from the top of the bus. iHeartRadio wrote that it "features an uptempo rhythm and an incredible dance troupe to go with".

Calling from the music video, Parton said: "They were trying to track me down. I guess Linus [Eklöw] and Christian [Karlsson], who are Galantis, had this song and they supposedly both were fans of mine. Somebody said 'Do you think we can find her? 'Do you think she'd do it?" During the shooting of the video, she confessed to Entertainment Tonight: "I thought, 'Why can't I fit in there? I've been everywhere else. Why can't I go there? I'm driving the bus, and I guess it's kinda like traveling life's highways. If I was the bus driver, I'd have to shine. [...] I can't dance. They surrounded me with such good dancers, so it made me look like I was all into that."

== Track listing ==
Digital download
No.	Title	Length
1.	"Faith" (feat. Mr. Probz)	3:06

Digital download – Remixes
No.	Title	Length
1.	"Faith" (feat. Mr. Probz) (Moti (DJ) & Terry McLove Remix)	4:05
2.	"Faith" (feat. Mr. Probz) (Galantis & Bali Bandits VIP Mix)	2:57
3.	"Faith" (feat. Mr. Probz) (JØRD Remix)	2:56
4.	"Faith" (feat. Mr. Probz) (Jewelz & Sparks Remix)	4:05
5.	"Faith" (John Dahlbäck Remix)	2:51
6.	"Faith" (Elliot Fitch Remix)	2:59

Digital download – Acoustic
No.	Title	Length
1.	"Faith" (feat. Mr. Probz) (Acoustic)	2:53

== Charts ==
=== Weekly charts ===
Weekly chart performance for "Faith"
Chart (2019–2020)	Peak position
Belgium (Ultratip Bubbling Under Wallonia)	3
New Zealand Hot Singles (RMNZ)	25
Scottish Singles Sales (Official Charts)	47
Slovakia Airplay (ČNS IFPI)	86
Sweden Heatseeker (Sverigetopplistan)	1
UK Singles Downloads (Official Charts)	55
US Dance Club Songs (Billboard)	29
US Digital Song Sales (Billboard)	45
US Hot Dance/Electronic Songs (Billboard)	10

=== Year-end charts ===
Year-end chart performance for "Faith"
Chart (2020)	Position
US Hot Dance/Electronic Songs (Billboard)	28

== Certifications ==
Certifications for "Faith"
Region	Certification	Certified units/sales
Canada (Music Canada)	Platinum	80,000^{‡}
United States (RIAA)	Gold	500,000^{‡}
^{‡} Sales+streaming figures based on certification alone.
