= Church (Galantis album) =

Studio album by Galantis
- Released: 7 February 2020
- Recorded: 2018–2019
- Length: 45:28
- Labels: Big Beat; Atlantic
- Producers: Galantis; Henrik Jonback; Bali Bandits; Svidden; Dave Saint Fleur; Eric Aukstikalnis; Hook n Sling; Mark Ralph; John Newman; Steve James; Passion Pit; Johannes Henriksson; Richard Anderson; Pete Nappi; Luke Nord; flyckt; Henrik "Papa Bear" Drottz; Fox Blanco; Yellow Claw; Danny Majic; DJ Frank E

Galantis chronology
The Aviary (2017)	Church (2020)	Rx (2024)

Singles from Church
- 1. "Bones" Released: 31 January 2019; 2. "I Found U" Released: 15 May 2019; 3. "We Can Get High" Released: 14 June 2019; 4. "Holy Water" Released: 27 September 2019; 5. "Faith" Released: 29 October 2019; 6. "Fuck Tomorrow Now" Released: 22 October 2020

Church is the third studio album by Swedish electronic dance music act Galantis. It was released on 7 February 2020 through Big Beat and Atlantic, and includes the singles "Bones", "I Found U", "We Can Get High", "Holy Water", "Faith", in collaboration with Dolly Parton and Mr Probz, and "Fuck Tomorrow Now".

== Track listing ==
Church track listing
No.	Title	Writer(s)	Producer(s)	Length
1.	"Steel"	Christian Karlsson; Henrik Jonback; Cathy Dennis; Salem Al Fakir; Vincent Pontare; Jan Postma; Jordi Fluiter	Bloodshy; Jonback; Bali Bandits	4:23
2.	"Faith" (with Dolly Parton featuring Mr Probz)	Karlsson; Jonback; Postma; Fluiter; Dolly Parton; Jazelle Rodriguez; David Saint Fleur; Eric Aukstikalnis; Dennis Stehr; Samuel Zammarelli; John Hiatt	Bloodshy; Jonback; Bali Bandits; Fleur; Aukstikalnis	3:06
3.	"Unless It Hurts"	Karlsson; Jonback; Dennis; Al Fakir; Pontare; Postma; Fluiter	Bloodshy; Jonback; Bali Bandits	2:57
4.	"Never Felt a Love Like This" (with Hook n Sling featuring Dotan)	Karlsson; Anthony Maniscalco; Jonback; Al Fakir; Pontare; Dotan Harpenau; Neil Ormandy	Bloodshy; Hook N Sling; Jonback	3:35
5.	"Holy Water"	Karlsson; Jimmy Koitzsch; Dennis; Jonback	Bloodshy; Svidden; Jonback	2:56
6.	"Hurricane" (with John Newman)	Karlsson; John Newman; Steve Booker; Postma; Fluiter	Bloodshy; Bali Bandits; Mark Ralph; Newman^{[c]}	3:21
7.	"Stella"	Karlsson; Jonback; Dennis; Postma; Fluiter	Bloodshy; Jonback; Bali Bandits	3:32
8.	"Bonfire" (with Steve James)	Karlsson; Stephen Philbin; Postma; Fluiter; Devesh Dayal; Dylan Rouda	Bloodshy; Steve James; Bali Bandits	3:13
9.	"I Found U" (with Passion Pit)	Karlsson; Koitzsch; Jonback; Michael Angelakos; Johannes Henriksson; Richard Anderson	Bloodshy; Svidden; Jonback; Passion Pit; Henriksson; Anderson	3:27
10.	"Fuck Tomorrow Now"	Karlsson; Jonback; Dennis; Postma; Fluiter	Bloodshy; Jonback; Bali Bandits	3:44
11.	"Miracle" (with Bali Bandits)	Karlsson; Jonback; Postma; Fluiter; Jake Davis; Meron Ryan	Bloodshy; Bali Bandits; Jonback; Pete Nappi^{[a]}	2:37
12.	"Feel Something" (featuring flyckt)	Karlsson; Jonback; Lucas Nord; Jonas Dyrsmeds; Jacob Criborn; Leonard Scheja; Oliver Storgards; Henrik Drottz; Robin Naettuerlund; Rasmus Flyckt	Bloodshy; Jonback; Luke Nord; flyckt; Papa Bear; Fox Blanco	2:35
13.	"We Can Get High" (with Yellow Claw)	Karlsson; Jim Taihuttu; Nils Rondhuis; Thom van der Bruggen; Sarah Solovay; Kyle Kelso	Bloodshy; Yellow Claw; Jonback	2:36
14.	"Bones" (featuring OneRepublic)	Karlsson; Koitzsch; Jonback; Andrew Grammer; David Brook; Ryan Tedder; Brett McLaughlin; Daniel Majic; Justin Franks	Bloodshy; Svidden; Jonback; Danny Majic; DJ Frank E	3:25
Total length:				45:27

Church – Japanese edition (bonus tracks)
No.	Title	Writer(s)	Producer(s)	Length
15.	"San Francisco" (Bali Bandits Extended Mix)	Karlsson; Eklow; Koitzsch; Jonback; Hannah Wilson; Ki McPhail; Joshua Wilkinson	Bloodshy; Eklow; Svidden; Jonback; Ki Fitzgerald^{[c]}; Wilkinson^{[c]}; Bali Bandits^{[r]}	4:50
16.	"Holy Water" (Steff Da Campo Remix)	Karlsson; Koitzsch; Dennis; Jonback	Bloodshy; Svidden; Jonback; Steff Da Campo^{[r]}	3:11
Total length:				53:40

Notes

- ^{^[c]} signifies a co-producer
- ^{^[a]} signifies an additional producer
- "Steel", "Unless It Hurts", "Holy Water", "Stella" and "Fuck Tomorrow Now" feature vocals from Cathy Dennis.
- "Miracle" features uncredited vocals from American singer Samantha Debra.
- "We Can Get High" features vocals from Sarah Solovay.

== Charts ==
Sales chart performance for Church
Chart (2020)	Peak position
US Top Dance Albums (Billboard)	4

== See also ==
- List of 2020 albums
