= Trio (1987 album) =

1987 album by Dolly Parton, Linda Ronstadt, and Emmylou Harris

Studio album by Dolly Parton, Linda Ronstadt, and Emmylou Harris
- Released: March 2, 1987
- Recorded: January–November 1986
- Studios: The Complex (Los Angeles); Woodland (Nashville); Ocean Way (Los Angeles)
- Genre: Country
- Length: 38:44
- Label: Warner Bros. Records
- Producer: George Massenburg

Dolly Parton, Linda Ronstadt, and Emmylou Harris chronology
Trio (1987)	Trio II (1999)

Dolly Parton chronology
Think About Love (1986)	Trio (1987)	The Best There Is (1987)

Linda Ronstadt chronology
For Sentimental Reasons (1986)	Trio (1987)	Canciones de Mi Padre (1987)

Emmylou Harris chronology
Thirteen (1986)	Trio (1987)	Angel Band (1987)

Singles from Trio
- 1. "To Know Him Is to Love Him" Released: January 26, 1987; 2. "Telling Me Lies" Released: May 11, 1987; 3. "Those Memories of You" Released: August 31, 1987; 4. "Wildflowers" Released: March 14, 1988

Trio is a collaborative album by American singers Dolly Parton, Linda Ronstadt, and Emmylou Harris. It was released on March 2, 1987, by Warner Bros. Records. The album has platinum certification in the U.S. for sales of one million copies, and has total worldwide sales around four million. A second collaborative album, Trio II, was released in 1999.

== Background ==
Longtime friends and admirers of one another, Parton, Harris, and Ronstadt first attempted to record an album together in the mid-1970s, but scheduling conflicts and other difficulties (including the fact that the three women all recorded for different record labels) prevented its release.

Some of the fruits of those unreleased 1970s recording sessions did make it onto the women's respective solo albums. "Mr. Sandman" and "Evangeline" appeared on Harris' album Evangeline and Parton's "My Blue Tears" was included on Ronstadt's 1982 album Get Closer. Rodney Crowell's "Even Cowgirls Get the Blues" was on Harris' Blue Kentucky Girl album. "Palms of Victory", another track from the 1970s sessions, was included on the Harris' 2007 box set Songbird: Rare Tracks and Forgotten Gems.

Parton and Ronstadt also recorded a version of the traditional ballad "I Never Will Marry", which appeared on Ronstadt's 1977 Simple Dreams album, though that was recorded separately from these sessions, as was Ronstadt's cover of Hank Williams' "I Can't Help It (If I'm Still in Love with You)", from Heart Like a Wheel, on which she was joined by Harris. During this time, Ronstadt and Harris also covered a number of Parton's compositions — Harris covered "Coat of Many Colors" and "To Daddy", and Ronstadt recorded "I Will Always Love You"—for inclusion on their various solo albums during the mid- to late 1970s. Parton, in turn, covered Harris' "Boulder to Birmingham", including it on her 1976 album, All I Can Do.

Finally, a collaboration effort came to fruition, being produced by George Massenburg. When Trio was released in March 1987, it spawned four hit singles, including a remake of Phil Spector's 1958 hit by the Teddy Bears, "To Know Him Is to Love Him".

== Critical reception ==
Professional ratings
Review scores
Source	Rating
AllMusic	4.5/5 stars
The Encyclopedia of Popular Music	4/5 stars
Pitchfork	7.8/10

Billboard published a review in the issue dated March 14, 1987, which said, "If the 'new traditionalists' in country music still have a body of work to draw from, it's largely because these three celestial songbirds kept it alive and vibrant throughout the adulterated '70s. But the members of the trio are not resting on their reputations here; their album is stunningly beautiful on every cut. Crossover is certain and will most likely be instantaneous, fueled by Ronstadt's current ride atop the Hot 100—in a duet with James Ingram—with 'Somewhere Out There'."

A review in the March 14, 1987, issue of Cashbox said, "The long-awaited collaboration of three of country/pop’s greatest voices is an unqualified success. The near-perfect song selection gives the three ample room to develop subtleties and nuance that in places is heart rending (listen to 'Telling Me Lies'). These three singular voices blend together in seamless harmony, floating over the sweetest country melodies and poignant understated lyrics. Augmented by an assemblage of some of the best sidemen available, including Albert Lee and Mark O'Connor among them."

== Commercial performance ==
The album peaked at number six on the main U.S. Billboard 200 Album chart. It peaked at number one on the U.S. Billboard Top Country Albums chart for five weeks. In Canada, the album peaked at number four on the RPM Top Albums chart. In Sweden, it peaked at number 29 on the Sverigetopplistan Albums Top 60 chart, and in the UK, it peaked at number 60 on the Official Charts Company UK Albums Chart.

The album's first single, "To Know Him Is to Love Him", was released in January 1987 and peaked at number one on the U.S. Billboard Hot Country Singles chart. The single also peaked at number one in Canada on the RPM Country Singles chart. The second single, "Telling Me Lies", was released in May 1987 and peaked at number three on the U.S. Billboard Hot Country Singles chart, number 35 on the U.S. Billboard Hot Adult Contemporary chart, and number six in Canada on the RPM Country Singles chart. "Those Memories of You" was released as the third single in August 1987 and it peaked at number five on the U.S. Billboard Hot Country Singles chart and number one in Canada on the RPM Country Singles chart. The album's fourth and final single, "Wildflowers", was released in March 1988 and peaked at number six on the U.S. Billboard Hot Country Singles chart and number eight in Canada on the RPM Country Singles chart.

== Accolades ==
The album won a Grammy Award for Best Country Performance by a Duo or Group with Vocal. It was also nominated for Album of the Year alongside Michael Jackson, U2, Prince, and Whitney Houston. "Telling Me Lies" was also nominated for Best Country Song. The album won the 1987 Academy of Country Music Award for Album of the Year and won Vocal Event of the Year at the Country Music Association Awards at the 1988 ceremony. In December 2020, Trio was inducted into the Grammy Hall of Fame.

30th Annual Grammy Awards

Year	Nominee / work	Award	Result
1988	Trio	Best Country Performance by a Duo or Group with Vocal	Won
1988	Trio	Album of the Year	Nominated
1988	"Telling Me Lies"	Best Country Song	Nominated

22nd Annual Academy of Country Music Awards

Year	Nominee / work	Award	Result
1987	Trio	Album of the Year	Won

22nd Country Music Association Awards

Year	Nominee / work	Award	Result
1988	Trio	Vocal Event of the Year	Won

== Track listing ==
Trio track listing
No.	Title	Writer(s)	Length
1.	"The Pain of Loving You"	Dolly Parton; Porter Wagoner	2:32
2.	"Making Plans"	Johnny Russell; Voni Morrison	3:36
3.	"To Know Him Is to Love Him"	Phil Spector	3:48
4.	"Hobo's Meditation"	Jimmie Rodgers	3:17
5.	"Wildflowers"	Parton	3:33
6.	"Telling Me Lies"	Linda Thompson; Betsy Cook	4:26
7.	"My Dear Companion"	Jean Ritchie	2:55
8.	"Those Memories of You"	Alan O'Bryant	3:58
9.	"I've Had Enough"	Kate McGarrigle	3:30
10.	"Rosewood Casket"	Traditional; arranged by Avie Lee Parton	2:59
11.	"Farther Along"	Traditional; arranged by John Starling; Emmylou Harris	4:10
Total length:			38:44

== Personnel ==
Adapted from the album liner notes.

Musicians

- Emmylou Harris – lead and harmony vocals, acoustic guitar (1, 5, 7), arrangements (11)
- Dolly Parton – lead and harmony vocals
- Linda Ronstadt – lead and harmony vocals
- Bill Payne – acoustic piano (6, 9, 11), electric piano (6), Hammond organ (11), harmonium (11)
- Albert Lee – acoustic guitar solo (1), acoustic guitar (2, 3, 6, 10, 11), high-strung guitar (2, 11), mandolin (5, 7), lead acoustic guitar (8)
- Steve Fishell – pedal steel guitar (1, 6), Dobro (4), Kona Hawaiian guitar (8)
- David Lindley – mandolin (1–3, 8), Kona Hawaiian guitar (3), autoharp (5, 7), harpolek (5), acoustic guitar (6), dulcimer (10)
- Ry Cooder – Tremolo guitar (3)
- John Starling – acoustic guitar (4), rhythm acoustic guitar (8), arrangements (11)
- Herb Pedersen – banjo (4), vocal arrangements (4, 6)
- Mark O'Connor – viola (1, 2, 5, 7), fiddle (2, 8), acoustic guitar (5), lead acoustic guitar (7), mandolin (10)
- Kenny Edwards – Ferrington acoustic bass (1–3, 5, 7, 8, 10), electric bass (6)
- Leland Sklar – Ferrington acoustic bass (4)
- Russ Kunkel – drums (1–3, 5, 6, 8)
- Marty Krystall – clarinet (9)
- Brice Martin – flute (9)
- Jodi Burnett – cello (9)
- Dennis Karmazyn – cello solo (9)
- Novi Novog – viola (9)
- David Campbell – orchestrations and conductor (6, 9)
- Charles Veal – concertmaster (6)
- Avie Lee Parton – arrangements (10)

Production

- George Massenburg – producer, recording
- Sharon Rice – assistant engineer
- Doug Sax – mastering at The Mastering Lab (Hollywood, California)
- Liza Edwards – production coordinator
- Robert Blakeman – photography
- John Kosh – art direction, design
- Ron Larson – art direction, design
- John Starling – music consultant

== Charts ==
=== Weekly charts ===
Weekly chart performance for Trio
Chart (1987)	Peak position
Australian Albums (Kent Music Report)	4
Canada Top Albums/CDs (RPM)	4
Dutch Albums (Album Top 100)	22
New Zealand Albums (RMNZ)	6
Swedish Albums (Sverigetopplistan)	29
UK Albums (Official Charts)	60
UK Country Albums (OCC)	1
US Billboard 200	6
US Top Country Albums (Billboard)	1
US Cashbox Country Albums	1
US Cash Box Top Albums	6

=== Year-end charts ===
1987 year-end chart performance for Trio
Chart (1987)	Position
Canada Top Albums/CDs (RPM)	29
New Zealand Albums (RMNZ)	43
US Billboard 200	62
US Top Country Albums (Billboard)	10

1988 year-end chart performance for Trio
Chart (1988)	Position
US Top Country Albums (Billboard)	20

== Certifications ==
Certifications for Trio
Region	Certification	Certified units/sales
United States (RIAA)	Platinum	1,000,000^{^}
^{^} Shipments figures based on certification alone.

== Release history ==
Release history and formats for Trio
Region	Date	Format	Label	Ref.
North America	March 2, 1987	LP; CD; cassette	Warner Bros. Records	
