= Tennessee Homesick Blues =

Single by Dolly Parton

from the album Rhinestone
- B-side: "Butterflies"
- Released: May 14, 1984
- Recorded: 1983
- Genre: Country
- Length: 3:35
- Label: RCA
- Songwriter: Dolly Parton
- Producer: Dolly Parton

Dolly Parton singles chronology
"Downtown" (1984)	"Tennessee Homesick Blues" (1984)	"God Won't Get You" (1984)

"Tennessee Homesick Blues" is a song written and recorded by American entertainer Dolly Parton that was featured in the soundtrack of the 1984 movie Rhinestone. It was released in May 1984 as the lead single from the film's soundtrack, it topped the U.S. country singles charts on September 8, 1984, as well as on the Canadian country singles charts. It also earned Parton her 10th overall nomination for the Grammy Award for Best Country Vocal Performance, Female.

== Content ==
A reminiscence of Parton's rural Tennessee upbringing, the song was similar in theme to some of her earlier compositions, including "My Tennessee Mountain Home", though in this case, the song found its protagonist (like the character Parton played in the film) stranded in New York City and reminiscing about the Great Smoky Mountains in rural Tennessee.

On a list of top 50 Dolly Parton songs, Rolling Stone magazine ranked "Tennessee Homesick Blues" as number 48, calling it a "jubilant celebration of Dolly’s Appalachian roots."

== Charts ==
=== Weekly charts ===
Chart (1984)	Peak position
US Hot Country Songs (Billboard)	1
Canadian RPM Country Tracks	1

=== Year-end charts ===
Chart (1984)	Position
US Hot Country Songs (Billboard)	19
