= David Malloy =

American songwriter

- Born: David Ernest Malloy
- Origin: Nashville, Tennessee, U.S.
- Genres: Country, pop, R&B
- Occupations: Singer-songwriter, record producer, A&R executive
- Instrument: Guitar
- Years active: 1972–2005, 2024–present

David Ernest Malloy is an American country music and pop songwriter, record producer and A&R executive with 41 number one hits in some category. He has received multiple Grammy nominations, as writer and/or producer, and has worked with many artists and projects including USA for Africa, Tim McGraw, Dancing with the Stars Julianne Hough, Eddie Rabbitt, Dolly Parton, Reba McEntire, Kenny Rogers, Mindy McCready, Badfinger, and Tanya Tucker. Malloy received Grammy nominations for writing the songs "Driving My Life Away" and "One Voice". He received the BMI Burton Award for "Suspicions", a song he wrote with Rabbitt.

== Early life ==
Music was a major part of Malloy's life from an early age. His father, Jim Malloy, is a Grammy Award–winning recording engineer. When Malloy was young, his father worked in recording studios around Los Angeles, but the family moved to Nashville when David was 13. Malloy took his first guitar lesson at 15 and immediately knew that he wanted to write and produce music for a living.

== Music career ==
Malloy's first major success as a songwriter/producer came in a collaborative effort with country music artists and songwriters Eddie Rabbitt and Even Stevens. Together they produced 16 number one hits. The success Malloy experienced with Rabbitt laid the groundwork for production and songwriting work with artists like Kenny Rogers, Dolly Parton, Tanya Tucker, Badfinger and Billy Burnette in the 1980s.

Malloy worked in the A&R department of Columbia/Epic Records and then ran the Nashville division of Elektra Records, and was a producer at Elektra in Los Angeles. Malloy produced the Mercury Records debut of Dancing with the Stars' Julianne Hough. The CD entered the country charts at number 1 and at number 3 on the overall Hot 100 chart. He also enjoyed chart success with Tim McGraw's version of "Suspicions" (written with Rabbitt). Other recent projects include co-producing a beach-themed concept album, Edge of the Blue, with songwriter/producer Tim Johnson.

Malloy largely retired from music in 2005 following the death of his son, but returned in 2024 to release an album titled Mirror.
