= List of songs recorded by Dolly Parton =

Songs by American country singer-songwriter

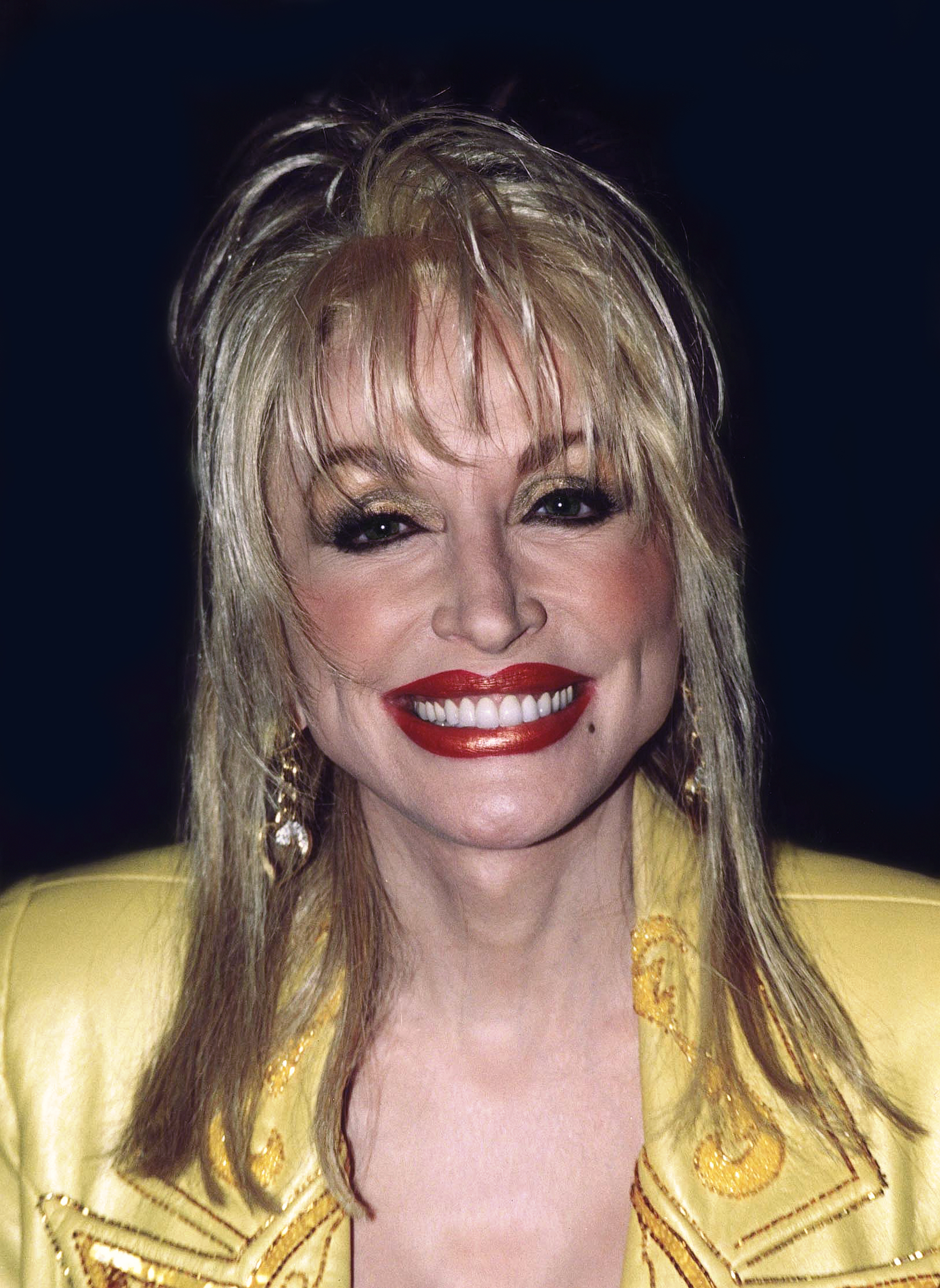
Parton in 2000

American country singer-songwriter Dolly Parton composed over 5,000 songs throughout her career. The total number of individual song titles she recorded and released is 957, totaling over 1,100 individual recordings when studio recordings, remixes, and live tracks are combined.

After releasing two unsuccessful singles as a teenager, Parton moved to Nashville, Tennessee in 1964 and signed a recording contract with Monument Records and released a series of singles on the label, the highest charting being her 1965 single "Happy, Happy Birthday Baby". In September 1967, Monument released Parton's debut solo album, Hello, I'm Dolly, containing the hits "Dumb Blonde" and "Something Fishy", which reached number 24 and number 17, respectively. Also in September 1967, Parton was asked to replace country vocalist Norma Jean as the "girl singer" on Porter Wagoner's syndicated television series The Porter Wagoner Show. The pair recorded 13 albums together for RCA Victor, and in the late 1960s and early 1970s had a series of top 10 hits on the country charts, including "The Last Thing on My Mind", "Tomorrow Is Forever", and "Daddy Was an Old Time Preacher Man". On Wagoner's television series, Parton gained a national audience of millions of viewers, and her own singles began to move up the country charts. By the early 1970s, her solo hits regularly appeared in the top 10, as did her duets with Wagoner. Her first chart-topper, 1970's "Joshua", followed by 1971's "Coat of Many Colors", 1972's "Touch Your Woman", and 1973's "Traveling Man" and "Jolene", all reached the top 10 on the US country singles chart, with "Jolene" becoming her second number one single in February 1974. In mid-1974, Parton split from Wagoner and his show in order to expand her career as a solo artist, writing and recording the number one hit, "I Will Always Love You" as a tribute to Wagoner.

Following her departure from Wagoner's show, Parton branched out into pop music with the 1977 single "Here You Come Again", which hit number one on the country chart and number three on the Billboard Hot 100, helping to produce a string of crossover hits in the late 1970s and early 1980s, including "Two Doors Down", "Heartbreaker", "You're the Only One", "9 to 5" and "But You Know I Love You".

After a slight commercial decline in the late 1980s, Parton signed with Columbia Records and returned to traditional country music with the album White Limozeen, which spawned the number one country singles, "Why'd You Come in Here Lookin' Like That" and "Yellow Roses". Two more traditional-themed albums were released in the early 1990s that were also successful, Eagle When She Flies (1991) and Slow Dancing with the Moon (1993).

In 1999 she signed a contract with Sugar Hill Records and recorded a series of bluegrass albums, beginning with The Grass Is Blue in 1999, followed by Little Sparrow (2001) and Halos & Horns (2002). In 2007 she formed her own record label, Dolly Records and the following year issued her first mainstream country album in over 10 years, Backwoods Barbie. That album produced five singles, including the minor country hit, "Better Get to Livin'", which peaked at number 48 on the Billboard country chart.

Parton holds the record for the most number one hits by a female country artist (25) and the record for most top 10 country albums on the Billboard Top Country Albums chart (41). She previously held the record for the most top 10 hits by a female country artist until Reba McEntire surpassed her in 2009 with her 56th top 10 hit, "Cowgirls Don't Cry". Parton is the first artist to have top 20 hits on Billboard's Hot Country Songs chart in six consecutive decades (1960s–2010s).

== Released songs ==
The table below lists every song recorded by Dolly Parton that has been commercially released. For the purpose of this table a song is considered commercially released if it was available on a single or album (regardless of whether or not the release was sanctioned by Parton) or was featured in a movie or television show.

| Title | Artist(s) | Writer(s) | Album | Year | Ref |
|---|---|---|---|---|---|
| "5 to 9" | Dolly Parton | Dolly Parton | Non-album single | 2021 | |
| "9 to 5" | Dolly Parton | Dolly Parton | 9 to 5 and Odd Jobs | 1980 | |
| "9 to 5" | Dolly Parton | Dolly Parton | 9 to 5 (Note: The soundtrack to the 1980 film, 9 to 5, featured two versions of "9 to 5". The first, "Main Title – Vocal", is the same version featured on Parton's 1980 album, 9 to 5 and Odd Jobs. The second version, "End Title – Vocal", is a shorter version which was played over the film's closing credits.) | 1980 | |
| "9 to 5" | Dolly Parton | Dolly Parton | Live and Well | 2004 | |
| "9 to 5" | Dolly Parton | Dolly Parton | Singer, Songwriter & Legendary Performer (Note: This live recording would later be included as a bonus track on the Walmart edition of Parton's 2008 album, Backwoods Barbie.) | 2007 | |
| "9 to 5" | Dolly Parton | Dolly Parton | 9 to 5 and Odd Jobs (Note: The 2009 reissue of 9 to 5 and Odd Jobs featured the "Love to Infinity Radio Mix 2008" and the "Karaoke Mix" in addition to original album version.) | 2009 | |
| "9 to 5" | Dolly Parton | Dolly Parton | Live from London | 2009 | |
| "9 to 5" | Dolly Parton | Dolly Parton | Live from Glastonbury 2014 | 2016 | |
| "9 to 5" | Dolly Parton, Caroline Sheen, Natalie McQueen, Ashford Campbell, Amber Davies and Original London Cast | Dolly Parton | 9 to 5: The Musical (Live West End Cast Recording) (Note: Also included is a reprise of "9 to 5" titled "9 to 5 Finale" performed by Dolly Parton and Original London Cast.) | 2020 | |
| "9 to 5 to 9" | Sabyn and Dolly Parton | Dolly Parton; Sabyn Mayfield | Halfway There | 2021 | |
| "19th Amendment (A Woman's Right)" | Dolly Parton | Dolly Parton | 27: The Most Perfect Album | 2018 | |
| "A Better Place to Live" | Dolly Parton | Dolly Parton | Coat of Many Colors | 1971 | |
| "A Bridge Across" | Dolly Parton and Mark O'Connor with the Nashville Symphony | Tom McBryde | This Is My America | 2008 | |
| "A Christmas to Remember" | Kenny Rogers and Dolly Parton | Dolly Parton | Once Upon a Christmas | 1984 | |
| "A Cowboy's Ways" | Dolly Parton | Dolly Parton | Burlap & Satin | 1983 | |
| "A Few Old Memories" | Dolly Parton | Hazel Dickens | The Grass Is Blue | 1999 | |
| "A Fool Like Me" | Porter Wagoner and Dolly Parton | Linda Carol Moore | Just Between You and Me: The Complete Recordings, 1967–1976 | 2014 | |
| "A Friend Like You" | Dolly Parton | Dolly Parton | I Believe in You | 2017 | |
| "A Gamble Either Way" | Dolly Parton | Dolly Parton | Burlap & Satin | 1983 | |
| "A Good Understanding" | Porter Wagoner and Dolly Parton | Dolly Parton | Once More | 1970 | |
| "A Habit I Can't Break" | Dolly Parton | Bill Owens | As Long as I Love | 1970 | |
| "A Lil' Ole Bitty Pissant Country Place" | Dolly Parton, Teresa Merritt, the Whorehouse Girls and Customers | Carol Hall | The Best Little Whorehouse in Texas | 1982 | |
| "A Little at a Time" | Dolly Parton | Dolly Parton | Touch Your Woman | 1972 | |
| "A Lot of You Left in Me" | Dolly Parton | Dolly Parton | Touch Your Woman | 1972 | |
| "A Smoky Mountain Christmas" | Dolly Parton | Dolly Parton | A Smoky Mountain Christmas (Note: Featured in the 1986 TV movie, A Smoky Mountain Christmas. A soundtrack album was never released.) | 1986 | |
| "A Smoky Mountain Christmas" | Dolly Parton | Dolly Parton | Sweet Mountain Christmas (Note: Featured in the 2019 Lifetime TV movie Sweet Mountain Christmas. A soundtrack album was never released.) | 2019 | |
| "A Tender Lie" | Dolly Parton | Randy Sharp | Little Sparrow | 2001 | |
| "A Tender Lie" | Dolly Parton | Randy Sharp | Love Always: Live from Texas | 2009 | |
| "A Vision of Mother" | Ricky Skaggs with Dolly Parton | Carter Stanley; Ralph Stanley | Don't Cheat in Our Hometown | 1983 | |
| "About Susanne, About Your Man" | Dolly Parton | Dolly Parton | Just Between You and Me: The Complete Recordings, 1967–1976 | 2014 | |
| "Act Like a Fool" | Dolly Parton | Dolly Parton | Heartbreak Express | 1982 | |
| "Afraid to Live and Afraid of Dying" | Dolly Parton | Porter Wagoner | Bubbling Over | 1973 | |
| "Afraid to Love Again" | Porter Wagoner and Dolly Parton | Jerry Chesnut; Theresa Beaty | Just the Two of Us | 1968 | |
| "After the Gold Rush" | Dolly Parton | Neil Young | Treasures | 1996 | |
| "After the Gold Rush" | Dolly Parton, Emmylou Harris and Linda Ronstadt | Neil Young | Trio II | 1999 | |
| "After the Gold Rush" | Dolly Parton | Neil Young | Live and Well | 2004 | |
| "Again" | Porter Wagoner and Dolly Parton | Porter Wagoner | Say Forever You'll Be Mine | 1975 | |
| "Alabama Sundown" | Dolly Parton | Dave Kirby; Danny Morrison | Bubbling Over | 1973 | |
| "All I Can Do" | Dolly Parton | Dolly Parton | All I Can Do | 1976 | |
| "All I Can Do" | Mary Kay Place with Dolly Parton | Dolly Parton | Tonite! At the Capri Lounge, Loretta Haggers | 1976 | |
| "All I Can Do" | Dolly Parton | Dolly Parton | Live at the Boarding House | 2006 | |
| "All I Can Do" | Dolly Parton | Dolly Parton | Live at the Bottom Line | 2015 | |
| "All I Need Is You" | Porter Wagoner and Dolly Parton | Betty Jean Robinson | Two of a Kind | 1971 | |
| "All I Want for Christmas Is You" | Dolly Parton and Jimmy Fallon | Mariah Carey; Walter Afanasieff | A Holly Dolly Christmas | 2020 | |
| "All Wrapped Up in You" | Dolly Parton | Dolly Parton | A Smoky Mountain Christmas | 1986 | |
| "Almost in Love" | Dolly Parton | Dean Parks; Doug Thiele | Great Balls of Fire | 1979 | |
| "Always, Always" | Porter Wagoner and Dolly Parton | Joyce McCord | Always, Always | 1969 | |
| "Always the First Time" | Dolly Parton | Joyce McCord | In the Good Old Days (When Times Were Bad) | 1969 | |
| "Amazing Grace" | Dolly Parton | John Newton | Precious Memories | 1999 | |
| "Amazing Grace" | Dolly Parton | John Newton | Blue Valley Songbird (Note: Featured in the 1999 TV movie, Blue Valley Songbird. A soundtrack album was never released.) | 1999 | |
| "Angel Band" | Dolly Parton | Jefferson Hascall; William B. Bradbury | Blue Valley Songbird | 1999 | |
| "Angel Hill" | Dolly Parton and Alyvia Alyn Lind | Dolly Parton | Dolly Parton's Coat of Many Colors (Note: Featured in the 2015 TV movie Dolly Parton's Coat of Many Colors. A soundtrack album was never released.) | 2015 | |
| "Angels and Eagles" | Kim McLean with Dolly Parton | Kim McLean; Devon O'Day | Happy Face | 2004 | |
| "Angels in the Midst" | Dolly Parton | Dolly Parton | Blue Smoke | 2014 | |
| "Another Woman's Man" | Dolly Parton | Dolly Parton | Jolene | 2007 | |
| "Anyplace You Want to Go" | Porter Wagoner and Dolly Parton | Porter Wagoner | Together Always | 1972 | |
| "Anything's Better Than Nothing" | Porter Wagoner and Dolly Parton | Marie Wilson | Always, Always | 1969 | |
| "Appalachian Memories" (Note: See also: "Smoky Mountain Memories".) | Dolly Parton | Dolly Parton | Burlap & Satin | 1983 | |
| "Appalachian Memories" | Brad Hudson featuring Dolly Parton | Dolly Parton | Next New Heartbreak | 2017 | |
| "Applejack" | Dolly Parton | Dolly Parton | New Harvest...First Gathering | 1977 | |
| "Applejack" | Dolly Parton | Dolly Parton | Heartsong (Note: Featured in the Heartsong short film that is shown daily at the Heartsong Theatre at Dollywood. A soundtrack album was never released.) | 1994 | |
| "Applejack" | Dolly Parton | Dolly Parton | Heartsongs: Live from Home | 1994 | |
| "Applejack" | Dolly Parton | Dolly Parton | Live and Well | 2004 | |
| "Applejack" | Dolly Parton | Dolly Parton | Live at the Boarding House | 2006 | |
| "Applejack" | Pam Gadd with Dolly Parton | Dolly Parton | Benefit of Doubt | 2009 | |
| "Applejack" | Dolly Parton | Dolly Parton | Live at the Bottom Line | 2015 | |
| "Applejack" | Linda Feller featuring Dolly Parton | Dolly Parton | 35 Jahre: Das Jubiläumsalbum | 2020 | |
| "Are You Tired of Me" | Dolly Parton, Emmylou Harris and Linda Ronstadt | A.P. Carter | The Complete Trio Collection | 2016 | |
| "As Long as I Love" | Dolly Parton | Dolly Parton | As Long as I Love | 1970 | |
| "As Much as Always" | Dolly Parton | Dolly Parton | Heartbreak Express | 1982 | |
| "As Soon as I Touched Him" | Dolly Parton | Norma Helms; Ken Hirsch | Here You Come Again | 1977 | |
| "Baby Come Out Tonight" | Dolly Parton | Kat McCord | Here You Come Again | 1977 | |
| "Baby I'm Burnin'" | Dolly Parton | Dolly Parton | Heartbreaker | 1978 | |
| "Baby I'm Burnin'" | Dolly Parton | Dolly Parton | Dance with Dolly (Note: Disco remix by Al Garrison and Warren Schatz of the original recording from Parton's 1978 album, Heartbreaker.) | 1978 | |
| "Baby I'm Burnin'" | Dolly Parton | Dolly Parton | Singer, Songwriter & Legendary Performer (Note: This live recording would later be included as a bonus track on the Best Buy edition of Parton's 2008 album, Backwoods Barbie.) | 2007 | |
| "Baby I'm Burnin'" | Dolly Parton | Dolly Parton | Live from Glastonbury 2014 (Note: Recorded as part of a medley.) | 2016 | |
| "Baby Blues" | Dolly Parton and Julianne Hough | Dolly Parton | Dolly Parton's Heartstrings (Note: Featured in the Netflix series Dolly Parton's Heartstrings. A soundtrack album was never released.) | 2019 | |
| "Baby Sister" | Dolly Parton | Shirl Milete | Just Because I'm a Woman | 1968 | |
| "Baby, It's Cold Outside" | Rod Stewart duet with Dolly Parton | Frank Loesser | Stardust: The Great American Songbook, Volume III | 2004 | |
| "Back Home" | Dolly Parton | Dolly Parton | My Tennessee Mountain Home | 1973 | |
| "Backwoods Barbie" | Dolly Parton | Dolly Parton | Backwoods Barbie | 2008 | |
| "Backwoods Barbie" | Dolly Parton | Dolly Parton | Live from London | 2009 | |
| "Ballad of the Green Beret" | Dolly Parton | Robert Moore; Barry Sadler | For God and Country | 2003 | |
| "Banks of the Ohio" | Dolly Parton | Traditional add. lyrics by Dolly Parton | Blue Smoke | 2014 | |
| "Banks of the Ohio" | Dolly Parton | Traditional add. lyrics by Dolly Parton | Live from Glastonbury 2014 | 2016 | |
| "Barbara Allen" | Dolly Parton | Traditional arr. by Dolly Parton | Heartsongs: Live from Home | 1994 | |
| "Barbara on Your Mind" | Dolly Parton | Dolly Parton | Heartbreak Express | 1982 | |
| "Barbara on Your Mind" | Dolly Parton | Dolly Parton | Jolene | 2007 | |
| "Be There" | Dolly Parton and Sylvester Stallone | Dolly Parton | Rhinestone | 1984 | |
| "Because I Love You" | Dolly Parton | Dolly Parton | Dolly | 1975 | |
| "Because One of Us Was Wrong" | Porter Wagoner and Dolly Parton | Dolly Parton; Bill Owens | Just Between You and Me | 1968 | |
| "Before I Met You" | Porter Wagoner and Dolly Parton | Charles L. Seitz; Joe Lewis; Elmer Rader | Just Between You and Me | 1968 | |
| "Before Our Weakness Gets Too Strong" | Porter Wagoner and Dolly Parton | Louis Owens | Once More | 1970 | |
| "Before the Next Teardrop Falls" | Dolly Parton | Ben Peters; Vivian Keith | Treasures | 1996 | |
| "Before You Make Up Your Mind" | Dolly Parton | Bill Owens | The Fairest of Them All | 1970 | |
| "Behind Closed Doors" | Dolly Parton | Kenny O'Dell | Treasures | 1996 | |
| "Beneath the Sweet Magnolia Tree" | Porter Wagoner and Dolly Parton | Dolly Parton | Porter & Dolly | 1980 | |
| "Beneath the Sweet Magnolia Tree" | Christie Lynn with Porter Wagoner and Dolly Parton | Dolly Parton | Christie Lynn Sings Country, Gospel & Bluegrass | 2006 | |
| "Beneath the Sweet Magnolia Tree" | Porter Wagoner and Dolly Parton | Dolly Parton | Just Between You and Me: The Complete Recordings, 1967–1976 (Note: Original master of the recording that was overdubbed for the 1980 album Porter & Dolly.) | 2014 | |
| "Berry Pie" | Dolly Parton | Dolly Parton | Backwoods Barbie: Collector's Edition | 2009 | |
| "Best Woman Wins" | Dolly Parton duet with Lorrie Morgan | Dolly Parton | Eagle When She Flies | 1991 | |
| "Better Day" | Dolly Parton | Dolly Parton | Better Day | 2011 | |
| "Better Get to Livin'" | Dolly Parton | Dolly Parton; Kent Wells | Backwoods Barbie | 2008 | |
| "Better Get to Livin'" | Dolly Parton | Dolly Parton; Kent Wells | Live from London | 2009 | |
| "Better Move It on Home" | Porter Wagoner and Dolly Parton | Ray Griff | The Best of Porter Wagoner & Dolly Parton | 1971 | |
| "Between Us" | Porter Wagoner and Dolly Parton | Dolly Parton | We Found It | 1973 | |
| "Big Dreams and Faded Jeans" | Dolly Parton | Dolly Parton | Run, Rose, Run | 2022 | |
| "Big T" | Dolly Parton and Ray Benson | Dolly Parton | Wild Texas Wind (Note: Featured in the 1991 TV movie, Wild Texas Wind. A soundtrack album was never released.) | 1991 | |
| "Big Wind" | Dolly Parton | Wayne P. Walker; Alex Zanetis; George McCormick | My Blue Ridge Mountain Boy | 1969 | |
| "Billy Dale" | Asleep at the Wheel featuring Dolly Parton | Dolly Parton | Tribute to the Music of Bob Wills and the Texas Playboys | 1993 | |
| "Black Draught Theme" | Dolly Parton | arr. by Dolly Parton | Heartsongs: Live from Home | 1994 | |
| "Blackie, Kentucky" | Dolly Parton | Dolly Parton | Love Is Like a Butterfly | 1974 | |
| "Blowin' in the Wind" | Dolly Parton with special guest Nickel Creek | Bob Dylan | Those Were the Days | 2005 | |
| "Blue Bonnet Breeze" | Dolly Parton | Dolly Parton | Run, Rose, Run | 2022 | |
| "Blue Grace" | Dolly Parton | Dolly Parton | Straight Talk | 1992 | |
| "Blue Me" | Dolly Parton | Dolly Parton | Straight Talk | 1992 | |
| "Blue Smoke" | Dolly Parton | Dolly Parton | Blue Smoke | 2014 | |
| "Blue Smoke" | Dolly Parton | Dolly Parton | Live from Glastonbury 2014 | 2016 | |
| "Blue Valley Songbird" | Dolly Parton | Dolly Parton | Hungry Again | 1998 | |
| "Blue Valley Songbird" | Dolly Parton | Dolly Parton | Blue Valley Songbird | 1999 | |
| "Bluegrass, White Snow" | Patty Loveless with Dolly Parton and Ricky Skaggs | Patty Loveless; Emory Gordy Jr. | Bluegrass & White Snow: A Mountain Christmas | 2002 | |
| "Bluer Pastures" | Dolly Parton | Dolly Parton | Little Sparrow | 2001 | |
| "Bobby's Arms" | Dolly Parton | Dolly Parton | Dolly | 1975 | |
| "Book of Life" | Dolly Parton | Jake R. Owens | The Golden Streets of Glory | 1971 | |
| "Boots and Sand" | Yusuf with Paul McCartney and Dolly Parton | Yusuf Islam | Roadsinger | 2009 | |
| "Born Again Wildflower" | Debbie Cochran featuring Dolly Parton | Debbie Cochran | Born Again Wildflower | 2017 | |
| "Both Sides Now" | Dolly Parton with special guests Judy Collins and Rhonda Vincent | Joni Mitchell | Those Were the Days | 2005 | |
| "Boulder to Birmingham" | Dolly Parton | Emmylou Harris; Bill Danoff | All I Can Do | 1976 | |
| "Brave Little Soldier" | Dolly Parton | Dolly Parton | Heartsongs: Live from Home | 1994 | |
| "Brave Little Soldier" | Dolly Parton | Dolly Parton | For God and Country | 2003 | |
| "Brave Little Soldier" | Dolly Parton | Dolly Parton | I Believe in You | 2017 | |
| "Bubbling Over" | Dolly Parton | Dolly Parton | Bubbling Over | 1973 | |
| "Burning" | Dolly Parton with Les Taylor | Dolly Parton | Straight Talk | 1992 | |
| "Burning the Midnight Oil" | Porter Wagoner and Dolly Parton | Porter Wagoner | The Right Combination • Burning the Midnight Oil | 1972 | |
| "Burning to Burned" | Dolly Parton | Dolly Parton | Straight Talk | 1992 | |
| "Busy Signal" | Dolly Parton | Ray Stevens | Single A-side | 1966 | |
| "But You Know I Love You" | Dolly Parton | Mike Settle | 9 to 5 and Odd Jobs | 1980 | |
| "But You Loved Me Then" | Dolly Parton | Dolly Parton | The Fairest of Them All | 1970 | |
| "Butterflies" | Dolly Parton | Dolly Parton | Rhinestone | 1984 | |
| "Calling My Children Home" | Dolly Parton, Emmylou Harris and Linda Ronstadt | Doyle Lawson; Charles Waller; Robert Yates | The Complete Trio Collection | 2016 | |
| "Calm on the Water" | Dolly Parton | Dolly Parton | Burlap & Satin | 1983 | |
| "Can't Be That Wrong" | Dolly Parton | Dolly Parton | Pure & Simple | 2016 | |
| "Carolina Moonshiner" | Porter Wagoner and Dolly Parton | Dolly Parton | Just Between You and Me: The Complete Recordings, 1967–1976 | 2014 | |
| "Cas Walker Theme" | Dolly Parton | Bud Brewster; Willie G. Brewster | Heartsongs: Live from Home | 1994 | |
| "Cash on the Barrelhead" | Dolly Parton | Ira Louvin; Charlie Louvin | The Grass Is Blue | 1999 | |
| "Celebrate the Dreamer" | Dolly Parton | Dolly Parton | Dream More: Celebrate the Dreamer in You | 2012 | |
| "Change" | Dolly Parton | Dolly Parton | Something Special | 1995 | |
| "Change It" | Dolly Parton featuring the Cast of 9 to 5: The Musical | Dolly Parton | Non-album single | 2009 | |
| "Chas" | Dolly Parton | Dolly Parton | The Fairest of Them All | 1970 | |
| "Chemo Hero" | Dolly Parton | Dolly Parton | I Believe in You | 2017 | |
| "Chet's Tune (Part 2)" | Some More of Chet's Friends (Note: Bud Brewer, Johnny Bush, Scotti Carson, Jessi Colter, Pat Daisy, Danny Davis and the Nashville Brass, Lester Flatt, Dallas Frazier, Anita Kerr Singers, Red Lane, Dickey Lee, Dolly Parton, Kenny Price, Charley Pride, Jerry Reed, Johnny Russell, Nat Stuckey, Buck Trent, Charlie Walker, Porter Wagoner, Billy Edd Wheeler, Norro Wilson, and Mac Wiseman.) | Cy Coben | "Chet's Tune" B-side | 1972 | |
| "Chicken Every Sunday" | Dolly Parton | Charlie Craig; Betty Craig | Joshua | 1971 | |
| "Christina" | Porter Wagoner and Dolly Parton | Dolly Parton | Together Always | 1972 | |
| "Christmas Is" | Dolly Parton featuring Miley Cyrus | Dolly Parton | A Holly Dolly Christmas | 2020 | |
| "Christmas on the Square" | Dolly Parton | Dolly Parton | A Holly Dolly Christmas | 2020 | |
| "Christmas State of Mind" | Dolly Parton | Dolly Parton | Sweet Mountain Christmas | 2019 | |
| "Christmas Time's a Comin'" | Dolly Parton | Tex Logan | Christmas Grass, Vol. 2 | 2004 | |
| "Christmas Where We Are" | Dolly Parton featuring Billy Ray Cyrus | Jada Roberts; Barry Jobe | A Holly Dolly Christmas | 2020 | |
| "Christmas Without You" | Kenny Rogers and Dolly Parton | Dolly Parton; Steve Goldstein | Once Upon a Christmas | 1984 | |
| "Church in the Wildwood" | Dolly Parton | William S. Pitts | Precious Memories | 1999 | |
| "Circle Game" | Kathie Lee with Dolly Parton | Joni Mitchell | Born for You (Note: Recorded as part of a medley with "Born for You". Parton only provided backing vocals on "Circle Game".) | 2000 | |
| "Circle of Friends" | Charlie Louvin with Dolly Parton and Alison Krauss | Earl Bud Lee, Rob Crosby | If Only in a Song | 2006 | |
| "Circle of Love" | Dolly Parton | Dolly Parton | Dolly Parton's Christmas of Many Colors: Circle of Love (Note: Featured in the 2016 TV movie Dolly Parton's Christmas of Many Colors: Circle of Love. A soundtrack album was never released.) | 2016 | |
| "Circle of Love" | Dolly Parton | Dolly Parton | A Holly Dolly Christmas (Note: This is possible the same version featured in Dolly Parton's Christmas of Many Colors: Circle of Love.) | 2020 | |
| "Closer by the Hour" | Porter Wagoner and Dolly Parton | Al Gore | Just the Two of Us | 1968 | |
| "Coat of Many Colors" | Dolly Parton | Dolly Parton | Coat of Many Colors | 1971 | |
| "Coat of Many Colors" | Dolly Parton | Dolly Parton | In Concert with Host Charley Pride | 1975 | |
| "Coat of Many Colors" | Dolly Parton | Dolly Parton | Great Moments at the Grand Ole Opry | 1976 | |
| "Coat of Many Colors" | Dolly Parton | Dolly Parton | Heartsongs: Live from Home | 1994 | |
| "Coat of Many Colors" | Shania Twain with Alison Krauss & Union Station and Dolly Parton | Dolly Parton | Just Because I'm a Woman: Songs of Dolly Parton | 2003 | |
| "Coat of Many Colors" | Dolly Parton | Dolly Parton | Live and Well | 2004 | |
| "Coat of Many Colors" | Dolly Parton | Dolly Parton | Live at the Boarding House | 2006 | |
| "Coat of Many Colors" | Dolly Parton | Dolly Parton | Singer, Songwriter & Legendary Performer | 2007 | |
| "Coat of Many Colors" | Dolly Parton | Dolly Parton | Love Always: Live from Texas | 2009 | |
| "Coat of Many Colors" | Dolly Parton | Dolly Parton | Live from London | 2009 | |
| "Coat of Many Colors" | Dolly Parton | Dolly Parton | A Real Live Dolly | 2009 | |
| "Coat of Many Colors" | Dolly Parton | Dolly Parton | Dream More: Celebrate the Dreamer in You | 2012 | |
| "Coat of Many Colors" | Dolly Parton | Dolly Parton | Dolly Parton's Coat of Many Colors (Note: Featured in the 2015 TV movie Dolly Parton's Coat of Many Colors. A soundtrack album was never released.) | 2015 | |
| "Coat of Many Colors" | Dolly Parton | Dolly Parton | Live at the Bottom Line | 2015 | |
| "Coat of Many Colors" | Dolly Parton | Dolly Parton | Live from Glastonbury 2014 | 2016 | |
| "Coat of Many Colors" | Dolly Parton | Dolly Parton | I Believe in You | 2017 | |
| "Coke and Chips" | Mary Kay Place with Dolly Parton | Paul Grady | Tonite! At the Capri Lounge, Loretta Haggers | 1976 | |
| "Cold" | Darrell Webb featuring Dolly Parton | Dolly Parton | Behind the Scenes | 2005 | |
| "Cologne" | Dolly Parton | Dolly Parton | Backwoods Barbie | 2008 | |
| "Color Me America" | Dolly Parton | Dolly Parton | For God and Country | 2003 | |
| "Come Back to Me" | Dolly Parton | Dolly Parton | Real Love | 1985 | |
| "Come to Me" | Porter Wagoner and Dolly Parton | Dolly Parton | Love and Music | 1973 | |
| "Come to Me" | Porter Wagoner and Dolly Parton | Dolly Parton | Just Between You and Me: The Complete Recordings, 1967–1976 | 2014 | |
| "Comes and Goes" | Dolly Parton | Porter Wagoner | My Favorite Songwriter, Porter Wagoner | 1972 | |
| "Comin' for to Carry Me Home" | Dolly Parton | arr. by Dolly Parton | Single A-side | 1971 | |
| "Comin' Home for Christmas" | Dolly Parton | Dolly Parton; Kent Wells | A Holly Dolly Christmas (Note: Originally released as a stand-alone single in 2009. Later included on A Holly Dolly Christmas in 2020.) | 2020 | |
| "Control Yourself" | Dolly Parton | Ben Peters | "Don't Drop Out" B-side | 1966 | |
| "Cora Is Gone" | Herb Pedersen with Dolly Parton | Odell McLeod | Sandman | 1977 | |
| "Corner of the World" | Andy Landis with Dolly Parton | Andy Landis, Steve Buckingham, Wil Jennings | Stranger | 1993 | |
| "Could I Have Your Autograph" | Dolly Parton | Dolly Parton | Rainbow | 1987 | |
| "Country Is as Country Does" | Dolly Parton | Dolly Parton; Mac Davis | Better Day | 2011 | |
| "Country Memories" | Dolly Parton | Dolly Parton | A Smoky Mountain Christmas | 1986 | |
| "Country Road" | Dolly Parton | Dolly Parton; Gary Scruggs | Eagle When She Flies | 1991 | |
| "Cowgirl & the Dandy" | Dolly Parton | Bobby Goldsboro | Here You Come Again | 1977 | |
| "Cracker Jack" | Dolly Parton | Dolly Parton | Jolene | 2007 | |
| "Creepin' In" | Norah Jones with Dolly Parton | Lee Alexander | Feels Like Home | 2004 | |
| "Crimson and Clover" | Dolly Parton with special guest Tommy James | Tommy James; Peter P. Lucia Jr. | Those Were the Days | 2005 | |
| "Crippled Bird" | Dolly Parton | Dolly Parton | Something Special | 1995 | |
| "Cross My Heart" | Dolly Parton | Rachel Dennison; Randy Parton; Frank Dycus | Slow Dancing with the Moon | 1993 | |
| "Cry, Cry Darlin'" | Dolly Parton | J.D. Miller; Jimmy C. Newman | Big Mon: The Songs of Bill Monroe | 2000 | |
| "Cuddle Up, Cozy Down Christmas" | Dolly Parton and Michael Bublé | Dolly Parton | A Holly Dolly Christmas | 2020 | |
| "Curse of the Wild Weed Flower" | Porter Wagoner and Dolly Parton | Dolly Parton; Louis Owens | Two of a Kind | 1971 | |
| "D-I-V-O-R-C-E" | Dolly Parton | Bobby Braddock; Curly Putman | In the Good Old Days (When Times Were Bad) | 1969 | |
| "Daddy" | Dolly Parton | Dolly Parton | My Blue Ridge Mountain Boy | 1969 | |
| "Daddy Come and Get Me" | Dolly Parton | Dolly Parton; Dorothy Jo Hope | The Fairest of Them All | 1970 | |
| "Daddy Come and Get Me" | Dolly Parton | Dolly Parton; Dorothy Jo Hope | A Real Live Dolly | 2009 | |
| "Daddy Did His Best" | Porter Wagoner and Dolly Parton | Jerry Chesnut | Porter & Dolly | 1980 | |
| "Daddy Did His Best" | Porter Wagoner and Dolly Parton | Jerry Chesnut | Just Between You and Me: The Complete Recordings, 1967–1976 | 2014 | |
| "Daddy Was an Old Time Preacher Man" | Porter Wagoner and Dolly Parton | Dolly Parton; Dorothy Jo Hope | Once More | 1970 | |
| "Daddy Was an Old Time Preacher Man" | Porter Wagoner and Dolly Parton | Dolly Parton; Dorothy Jo Hope | Just Between You and Me: The Complete Recordings, 1967–1976 | 2014 | |
| "Daddy Won't Come Home Anymore" | Dolly Parton | Dolly Parton | As Long as I Love | 1970 | |
| "Daddy's Moonshine Still" | Dolly Parton | Dolly Parton | Joshua | 1971 | |
| "Daddy's Old Fiddle" | The Charlie Daniels Band with Dolly Parton | Dolly Parton | Deuces | 2007 | |
| "Daddy's Working Boots" | Dolly Parton | Dolly Parton | My Tennessee Mountain Home | 1973 | |
| "Dagger Through the Heart" | Dolly Parton | Dolly Parton | Halos & Horns | 2002 | |
| "Dagger Through the Heart" | Dolly Parton | Dolly Parton | Live and Well | 2004 | |
| "Dark as a Dungeon" | Dolly Parton | Merle Travis | 9 to 5 and Odd Jobs | 1980 | |
| "Dark Night, Bright Future" | Dolly Parton | Dolly Parton | Run, Rose, Run | 2022 | |
| "Deck the Halls" | Dolly Parton | Traditional; Thomas Oliphant (lyrics) | Home for Christmas: The Radio Special | 1990 | |
| "Demons" | Dolly Parton featuring Ben Haggard | Dolly Parton | Run, Rose, Run | 2022 | |
| "Deportee (Plane Wreck at Los Gatos)" | Dolly Parton | Woody Guthrie; Martin Hoffman | 9 to 5 and Odd Jobs | 1980 | |
| "Detroit City" | Dolly Parton | Danny Dill; Mel Tillis | 9 to 5 and Odd Jobs | 1980 | |
| "Dirty Job" | Dolly Parton | Dolly Parton | Straight Talk | 1992 | |
| "Dixie Darling" | Dolly Parton and Arlo Guthrie | A.P. Carter | Banjoman: A Tribute to Derroll Adams | 2002 | |
| "Do I Ever Cross Your Mind" | Chet Atkins and Dolly Parton | Dolly Parton | The Best of Chet Atkins & Friends | 1976 | |
| "Do I Ever Cross Your Mind" | Dolly Parton | Dolly Parton | Heartbreak Express | 1982 | |
| "Do I Ever Cross Your Mind" | Dolly Parton | Dolly Parton | Think About Love (Note: Remixed by Joe Scaife and Mark Wright at Music Mill in Nashville, Tennessee.) | 1986 | |
| "Do I Ever Cross Your Mind" | Randy Travis duet with Dolly Parton | Dolly Parton | Heroes & Friends | 1990 | |
| "Do I Ever Cross Your Mind" | Dolly Parton, Emmylou Harris and Dolly Parton | Dolly Parton | Trio II | 1999 | |
| "Do I Ever Cross Your Mind" | Dolly Parton | Dolly Parton | Live at the Boarding House | 2006 | |
| "Do I Ever Cross Your Mind" | Dolly Parton | Dolly Parton | Live from London | 2009 | |
| "Do I Ever Cross Your Mind" | Dolly Parton | Dolly Parton | Live at the Bottom Line | 2015 | |
| "Do I Ever Cross Your Mind" | Dolly Parton, Emmylou Harris and Linda Ronstadt | Dolly Parton | The Complete Trio Collection | 2016 | |
| "Do I Love You (Yes in Every Way)" | Paul Anka with Dolly Parton | Paul Anka; Alain Joseph Yves Le Govic; Maxime Piolot; Michel Albert Louis Pelay; Yves Dessca | Duets | 2013 | |
| "Do You Hear the Robbins Sing" | Dolly Parton | Porter Wagoner | My Favorite Songwriter, Porter Wagoner | 1972 | |
| "Do You Know" | Jessica Simpson with Dolly Parton | Dolly Parton | Do You Know | 2008 | |
| "Do You Think That Time Stands Still" | Dolly Parton | Dolly Parton | Great Balls of Fire | 1979 | |
| "Does He Love You" | Reba McEntire featuring Dolly Parton | Sandy Knox; Billy Stritch | Revived Remixed Revisited | 2021 | |
| "Dolly P" | Beyoncé and Dolly Parton | Beyoncé Knowles-Carter; Leah Takele; Dolly Parton | Cowboy Carter | 2024 | |
| "Don't Call It Love" | Dolly Parton | Dean Pitchford; Tom Snow | Real Love | 1985 | |
| "Don't Drop Out" | Dolly Parton | James Cason; Bobby Russell | Single A-side | 1966 | |
| "Don't Let It Trouble Your Mind" | Dolly Parton | Dolly Parton | In the Good Old Days (When Times Were Bad) | 1969 | |
| "Don't Let Me Cross Over" | Dolly Parton | Penny Jay | Treasures | 1996 | |
| "Don't Step Over an Old Love" | Ricky Skaggs with Dolly Parton | Fred Stryker | Don't Cheat in Our Hometown | 1983 | |
| "Don't Think Twice" | Dolly Parton | Bob Dylan | Blue Smoke | 2014 | |
| "Down" | Dolly Parton | Dolly Parton | Great Balls of Fire | 1979 | |
| "Down from Dover" | Dolly Parton | Dolly Parton | The Fairest of Them All | 1970 | |
| "Down from Dover" | Dolly Parton | Dolly Parton | Little Sparrow | 2001 | |
| "Down on Music Row" | Dolly Parton | Dolly Parton | My Tennessee Mountain Home | 1973 | |
| "Downtown" | Dolly Parton | Tony Hatch | The Great Pretender | 1984 | |
| "Dr. Robert F. Thomas" | Dolly Parton | Dolly Parton | My Tennessee Mountain Home | 1973 | |
| "Dreaming My Dreams with You" | Alison Krauss with Dolly Parton and Lyle Lovett | Allen Reynolds | Forget About It | 1999 | |
| "Dreams Do Come True" | Dolly Parton | Bill Owens | Eagle When She Flies | 1991 | |
| "Dreams Do Come True" | Bill Owens with Dolly Parton | Bill Owens | Dreams Do Come True | | |
| "Drifting Too Far from the Shore" | Porter Wagoner duet with Dolly Parton | Charles E. Moody | Best of Grand Old Gospel 2008 | 2007 | |
| "Driven" | Dolly Parton | Dolly Parton | Run, Rose, Run | 2022 | |
| "Drives Me Crazy" | Dolly Parton | Roland Gift; David Steele | Backwoods Barbie | 2008 | |
| "Dumb Blonde" | Dolly Parton | Curly Putman | Hello, I'm Dolly | 1967 | |
| "Dumb Blonde" | Dolly Parton | Curly Putman | A Real Live Dolly | 1970 | |
| "Dumb Blonde" | Dolly Parton and Miranda Lambert | Curly Putman | Dumplin' | 2018 | |
| "Dump the Dude" | Dolly Parton | Steve Dorff; Allan Rich | Rainbow | 1987 | |
| "Each Season Changes You" | Porter Wagoner and Dolly Parton | Ruth Talley | Porter Wayne and Dolly Rebecca | 1970 | |
| "Eager to Please" | Dolly Parton | Dolly Parton | First Dog (Note: Featured in the 2010 film First Dog. A soundtrack album was never released.) | 2010 | |
| "Eagle When She Flies" | Dolly Parton | Dolly Parton | Eagle When She Flies | 1991 | |
| "Eagle When She Flies" | José Feliciano featuring Dolly Parton | Dolly Parton | Behind This Guitar | 2021 | |
| "Early Morning Breeze" | Dolly Parton | Dolly Parton | Coat of Many Colors | 1971 | |
| "Early Morning Breeze" | Dolly Parton | Dolly Parton | Jolene | 1974 | |
| "Early Morning Breeze" | Dolly Parton | Dolly Parton | Blue Smoke | 2014 | |
| "Elusive Butterfly" | Dolly Parton | Bob Lind | The Great Pretender | 1984 | |
| "Endless Stream of Tears" | Dolly Parton | Dolly Parton | The Grass Is Blue | 1999 | |
| "Entr'acte" | Dolly Parton, Bonnie Langford, Brian Conley, Amber Davies, Caroline Sheen, Natalie McQueen and Original London Cast | Dolly Parton | 9 to 5: The Musical (Live West End Cast Recording) | 2020 | |
| "Eugene, Oregon" | Dolly Parton | Dolly Parton | Dolly | 2009 | |
| "Evangeline" | Emmylou Harris with Linda Ronstadt and Dolly Parton | Robbie Robertson | Evangeline | 1981 | |
| "Even a Fool Would Let Go" | Dolly Parton | Tom Snow; Kerry Chater | Dolly, Dolly, Dolly | 1980 | |
| "Even Cowgirls Get the Blues" | Emmylou Harris with Dolly Parton and Linda Ronstadt | Rodney Crowell | Blue Kentucky Girl | 1979 | |
| "Evening Shade" | Dolly Parton | Dolly Parton | My Blue Ridge Mountain Boy | 1969 | |
| "Everyday Hero" | Dolly Parton | Blaise Tosti; Robert O'Hearn | Rainbow | 1987 | |
| "Everyday People" | Dolly Parton | Sly Stone | 9 to 5 and Odd Jobs | 2009 | |
| "Everyone But Me and You" | Mac Davis duet with Dolly Parton | Mac Davis | Will Write Songs for Food | 1994 | |
| "Everything's Beautiful (In Its Own Way)" | Willie Nelson and Dolly Parton | Dolly Parton | The Winning Hand (Note: Overdubbed version of Parton's 1966 recording featuring new duet vocals by Willie Nelson recorded in 1981. Parton's 1966 recording would not be released until 1988 on the European compilation album, Everything's Beautiful.) | 1982 | |
| "Everything's Beautiful (In Its Own Way)" | Dolly Parton | Dolly Parton | Everything's Beautiful | 1988 | |
| "Everything's Beautiful (In Its Own Way)" | Dolly Parton | Dolly Parton | Dolly | 2009 | |
| "Faith" (Note: Four remixes of "Faith" were released as digital downloads: Jewelz & Sparks Remix, JØRD Remix, Galantis & Bali Bandits VIP Mix, and an Acoustic version.) | Galantis and Dolly Parton featuring Mr Probz | Dolly Parton; Christian Karlsson; Henrik Jonback; John Hiatt; Linus Eklöw; Jimmy Koitzsch; Sam James; David Saint Fleur | Church | 2019 | |
| "Falling Out of Love with Me" | Dolly Parton | Dolly Parton | All I Can Do | 1976 | |
| "Falling Out of Love with Me" | Pinmonkey featuring Dolly Parton | Dolly Parton | Pinmonkey | 2002 | |
| "False Eyelashes" | Dolly Parton | Demetris Tapp; Bob Tubert | Just Because I'm a Woman | 1968 | |
| "Family" | Dolly Parton | Dolly Parton; Carl Perkins | Eagle When She Flies | 1991 | |
| "Family of Friends" | Dolly Parton | Dolly Parton | First Dog | 2010 | |
| "Farther Along" | Dolly Parton, Emmylou Harris and Linda Ronstadt | Traditional arr. by John Starling and Emmylou Harris | Trio | 1987 | |
| "Farther Along" | Dolly Parton | Traditional | Wild Texas Wind | 1991 | |
| "Farther Along" | Dolly Parton | Traditional | Precious Memories | 1999 | |
| "Farther Along" | Dolly Parton, Emmylou Harris and Linda Ronstadt | Traditional arr. by John Starling and Emmylou Harris | The Complete Trio Collection | 2016 | |
| "Feels Like Home" | Dolly Parton, Emmylou Harris and Dolly Parton | Randy Newman | Trio II | 1999 | |
| "Fight and Scratch" | Porter Wagoner and Dolly Parton | Dolly Parton | Once More | 1970 | |
| "Firecracker" | Dolly Parton | Dolly Parton | Run, Rose, Run | 2022 | |
| "First Noel" | Dolly Parton | Traditional arr. by the Mighty Fine Band | Home for Christmas | 1990 | |
| "Fish Out of Water" | Dolly Parton | Dolly Parton | Straight Talk | 1992 | |
| "Fisherman's Song" | Dolly Parton | Judy Collins | Born to the Breed: A Tribute to Judy Collins | 2008 | |
| "Fool for Your Love" | Dolly Parton | Michael Omartian; Leo Sayer | Dolly, Dolly, Dolly | 1980 | |
| "For the Good Times" | Dolly Parton | Kris Kristofferson | Treasures | 1996 | |
| "Forbidden Love" | Bill Owens and Dolly Parton | Bill Owens; Dolly Parton | "So Little I Wanted, So Little I Got" B-side | 1960 | |
| "Forever" | Dolly Parton, Angela Grovey and DeQuina Moore | Chris Brown; Jamal Jones; Brian Kennedy; Andre Merritt; Rob Allen | Joyful Noise | 2012 | |
| "Forever Country" | Artists of Then, Now & Forever (Note: Brad Paisley, Keith Urban, Tim McGraw, Faith Hill, Little Big Town, Luke Bryan, Miranda Lambert, Blake Shelton, George Strait, Kacey Musgraves, Eric Church, Ronnie Milsap, Charley Pride, Dierks Bentley, Trisha Yearwood, Lady Antebellum, Darius Rucker, Martina McBride, Jason Aldean, Rascal Flatts, Willie Nelson, Brooks & Dunn, Alabama, Brett Eldredge, Reba McEntire, Alan Jackson, Vince Gill, Carrie Underwood, and Dolly Parton) | Bill Danoff; Taffy Nivert; John Denver; Willie Nelson; Dolly Parton | Non-album single | 2016 | |
| "Forever Home" | Dolly Parton | Dolly Parton | Sha-Kon-O-Hey! Land of Blue Smoke | 2009 | |
| "Forever Love" | Dolly Parton | Dolly Parton | Pure & Simple | 2016 | |
| "Forty Miles from Poplar Bluff" | Porter Wagoner and Dolly Parton | Frank Dycus | Porter Wayne and Dolly Rebecca | 1970 | |
| "Four O Thirty Three" | Porter Wagoner and Dolly Parton | Bill Owens; Earl Montgomery | Just Between You and Me | 1968 | |
| "Fresh Out of Forgiveness" | Dolly Parton | Bill Owens; Gene Gill | In the Good Old Days (When Times Were Bad) | 1969 | |
| "Friends Tell Friends" | Bill Phillips with Dolly Parton | Dolly Parton; Bill Owens | Bill Phillips' Style | 1967 | |
| "From Here to the Moon and Back" | Dolly Parton, Kris Kristofferson and Jeremy Jordan | Dolly Parton | Joyful Noise | 2012 | |
| "From Here to the Moon and Back" | Willie Nelson with Dolly Parton | Dolly Parton | To All the Girls... (Note: This recording of "From Here to the Moon and Back" would later be included on Parton's 2014 album, Blue Smoke.) | 2013 | |
| "Fuel to the Flame" | Dolly Parton | Dolly Parton; Bill Owens | Hello, I'm Dolly | 1967 | |
| "Full Circle" | Dolly Parton | Dolly Parton | Slow Dancing with the Moon | 1993 | |
| "Games People Play" | Dolly Parton | Joe South | My Blue Ridge Mountain Boy | 1969 | |
| "Gee Ma, I Wanna Go Home" | Dolly Parton | Dolly Parton | For God and Country | 2003 | |
| "Get Out and Stay Out" | Dolly Parton | Dolly Parton | Better Day | 2011 | |
| "Get Up, Get Out, Get On" | Dolly Parton | Dolly Parton | Blue Smoke | 2014 | |
| "Gettin' Happy" | Dolly Parton | Dolly Parton | Love Is Like a Butterfly | 1974 | |
| "Getting in My Way" | Dolly Parton | Dolly Parton | New Harvest...First Gathering | 1977 | |
| "Getting in My Way" | Dolly Parton | Dolly Parton | Live at the Boarding House | 2006 | |
| "Getting in My Way" | Dolly Parton | Dolly Parton | Live at the Bottom Line | 2015 | |
| "Girl in the Movies" | Dolly Parton | Dolly Parton; Linda Perry | Dumplin' | 2018 | |
| "Girl Left Alone" | Dolly Parton | Bill Owens; Dorothy Jo Hope; Dolly Parton | "Puppy Love" B-side | 1959 | |
| "Girl on Fire" | Dolly Parton | Alicia Keys; Salaam Remi; Jeff Bhasker; Billy Squier | Live from Glastonbury 2014 | 2016 | |
| "Go Tell It on the Mountain" | Dolly Parton | John Wesley Work Jr. arr. by the Mighty Fine Band | Home for Christmas | 1990 | |
| "Go to Hell" | Dolly Parton | Dolly Parton | For God and Country | 2003 | |
| "God Bless the U.S.A." | Dolly Parton | Lee Greenwood | For God and Country | 2003 | |
| "God Only Knows" (Note: A remix of "God Only Knows" was released as a digital download, the Team Timbo Remix.) | For King & Country and Dolly Parton | Josh Kerr; Jordan Reynolds; Joel Smallbone; Luke Smallbone; Tedd Tjornhom | Non-album single | 2019 | |
| "God Won't Get You" | Dolly Parton | Dolly Parton | Rhinestone | 1984 | |
| "God's Coloring Book" | Dolly Parton | Dolly Parton | Here You Come Again | 1977 | |
| "God's Coloring Book" | Dolly Parton | Dolly Parton | Heartsong | 1994 | |
| "God's Coloring Book" | Margo O'Donnell featuring Dolly Parton | Dolly Parton | The Highway of My Life | 1999 | |
| "God's Coloring Book" | Charley Pride featuring Dolly Parton | Dolly Parton | Pride and Joy: A Gospel Music Collection | 2006 | |
| "God's Coloring Book" | Dolly Parton | Dolly Parton | Singer, Songwriter & Legendary Performer | 2007 | |
| "God's Coloring Book" | Dolly Parton | Dolly Parton | Dolly | 2009 | |
| "Gold" | Emmylou Harris with Dolly Parton and Vince Gill | Emmylou Harris | All I Intended to Be | 2008 | |
| "Gonna Hurry (As Slow as I Can)" | Dolly Parton | Dolly Parton; Bill Owens | Dolly | 2009 | |
| "Good as Gold" | Porter Wagoner and Dolly Parton | Paul Martin | Always, Always | 1969 | |
| "Good as Gold" | Porter Wagoner and Dolly Parton | Paul Martin | Just Between You and Me: The Complete Recordings, 1967–1976 | 2014 | |
| "Good Old Country Baptizin'" | Mary Kay Place with Dolly Parton | Traditional arr. by Brian Ahern | Tonite! At the Capri Lounge, Loretta Haggers | 1976 | |
| "Good Time" | Dolly Parton | Dolly Parton | Sha-Kon-O-Hey! Land of Blue Smoke | 2009 | |
| "Great Balls of Fire" | Dolly Parton | Otis Blackwell; Jack Hammer | Great Balls of Fire | 1979 | |
| "Great Balls of Fire" | Dolly Parton | Otis Blackwell; Jack Hammer | Live from Glastonbury 2014 | 2016 | |
| "Green Pastures" | Emmylou Harris with Ricky Skaggs and Dolly Parton | Traditional arr. by Brian Ahern | Roses in the Snow | 1980 | |
| "Green-Eyed Boy" | Dolly Parton | Dolly Parton | Something Special | 1995 | |
| "Grey Funnel Line" | Dolly Parton, Emmylou Harris and Linda Ronstadt | Cyril Tawney | The Complete Trio Collection | 2016 | |
| "Gypsy, Joe and Me" | Dolly Parton | Dolly Parton | My Blue Ridge Mountain Boy | 1969 | |
| "Hallelujah Holiday" | Dolly Parton | Dolly Parton | Backwoods Barbie: Collector's Edition | 2009 | |
| "Halos and Horns" | Dolly Parton | Dolly Parton | Halos & Horns | 2002 | |
| "Halos and Horns" | Dolly Parton | Dolly Parton | Live and Well | 2004 | |
| "Hand Me Downs" | Janelle Arthur featuring Dolly Parton | Janelle Arthur; Emily Lynch | Non-album single | 2021 | |
| "Handful of Dust" | Dolly Parton, Emmylou Harris and Linda Ronstadt | Tony Arata | The Complete Trio Collection | 2016 | |
| "Happy All the Time" | Sam Williams featuring Dolly Parton | Sam Williams; Mary Gauthier | Glasshouse Children | 2021 | |
| "Happy, Happy Birthday Baby" | Dolly Parton | Margo Sylvia; Gilbert Lopez | Single A-side | 1965 | |
| "Happy, Happy Birthday Baby" | Willie Nelson and Dolly Parton | Margo Sylvia; Gilbert Lopez | The Winning Hand (Note: Overdubbed version of Parton's 1965 recording featuring new duet vocals by Willie Nelson recorded in 1981.) | 1982 | |
| "Hard Candy Christmas" | Dolly Parton and the Whorehouse Girls | Carol Hall | The Best Little Whorehouse in Texas | 1982 | |
| "Hard Candy Christmas" | Dolly Parton | Carol Hall | Single A-side (Note: Single edit of the recording released on The Best Little Whorehouse in Texas soundtrack. It is shorter in length and only credited to Parton.) | 1982 | |
| "Harper Valley PTA" | Dolly Parton | Tom T. Hall | In the Good Old Days (When Times Were Bad) | 1969 | |
| "He Left Me Love" | Dolly Parton | Porter Wagoner | My Favorite Songwriter, Porter Wagoner | 1972 | |
| "He Rode All the Way to Texas" | Dolly Parton, Emmylou Harris and Dolly Parton | John Starling | Trio II | 1999 | |
| "He Would Know" | Dolly Parton | Dolly Parton | The Bargain Store | 1975 | |
| "He's a Go-Getter" | Dolly Parton | Dolly Parton | In the Good Old Days (When Times Were Bad) | 1969 | |
| "He's a Go-Getter" | Dolly Parton | Dolly Parton | A Real Live Dolly | 2009 | |
| "He's Alive" | Dolly Parton | Don Francisco | White Limozeen | 1989 | |
| "He's Alive" | Dolly Parton | Don Francisco | Heartsong | 1994 | |
| "He's Everything" | Queen Latifah, Dolly Parton, Keke Palmer, Jeremy Jordan, Andy Karl and DeQuina Moore | Dolly Parton | Joyful Noise | 2012 | |
| "Head Over High Heels" | Dolly Parton | Dolly Parton | Pure & Simple | 2016 | |
| "Healing Hands" | Sonya Isaacs with Dolly Parton and Vince Gill | Sonya Isaacs; Keith Sewell | Sonya Isaacs | 2000 | |
| "Heart Door" | Paula Cole with Dolly Parton | Paula Cole | Sweet November | 2001 | |
| "Heart of the Smokies" | Dolly Parton | Dolly Parton | Sha-Kon-O-Hey! Land of Blue Smoke | 2009 | |
| "Heartbreak Express" | Dolly Parton | Dolly Parton | Heartbreak Express | 1982 | |
| "Heartbreaker" | Dolly Parton | David Wolfert; Carole Bayer Sager | Heartbreaker | 1978 | |
| "Heartbreaker's Alibi" | Rhonda Vincent duet with Dolly Parton | Honey Brassfield | All American Bluegrass Girl | 2006 | |
| "Heartsong" | Dolly Parton | Dolly Parton | Heartsong (Note: Featured in the Heartsong short film that is shown daily at the Heartsong Theatre at Dollywood. "Heartsong" is split into four segments throughout the short film. A soundtrack album was never released.) | 1994 | |
| "Heartsong" | Dolly Parton | Dolly Parton | Heartsongs: Live from Home (Note: The album also features a reprise of "Heartsong" in addition to the full version.) | 1994 | |
| "Heaven's Just a Prayer Away" | Dolly Parton | Tommy Tomlinson | The Golden Streets of Glory | 1971 | |
| "Hello God" | Dolly Parton | Dolly Parton | Halos & Horns | 2002 | |
| "Hello God" | Dolly Parton | Dolly Parton | Singer, Songwriter & Legendary Performer | 2007 | |
| "Help!" | Dolly Parton | John Lennon; Paul McCartney | Great Balls of Fire | 1979 | |
| "Her and the Car and the Mobile Home" | Porter Wagoner and Dolly Parton | Dave Kirby; Don Stock | The Right Combination • Burning the Midnight Oil | 1972 | |
| "Here Comes the Freedom Train" | Porter Wagoner and Dolly Parton | Steve Lemberg | Single A-side | 1973 | |
| "Here I Am" | Dolly Parton | Dolly Parton | Coat of Many Colors | 1971 | |
| "Here I Am" | Dolly Parton and Sia | Dolly Parton | Dumplin' | 2018 | |
| "Here You Come Again" | Dolly Parton | Barry Mann; Cynthia Weil | Here You Come Again | 1977 | |
| "Here You Come Again" | Dolly Parton | Barry Mann; Cynthia Weil | Live and Well | 2004 | |
| "Here You Come Again" | Dolly Parton | Barry Mann; Cynthia Weil | Live from London | 2009 | |
| "Here You Come Again" | Dolly Parton | Barry Mann; Cynthia Weil | Live from Glastonbury 2014 | 2016 | |
| "Here You Come Again" | Dolly Parton and Willa Amai | Barry Mann; Cynthia Weil | Dumplin' (Note: In addition to the newly recorded duet with Willa Amai, the version of the album released to streaming services also features a remix of Parton's original 1977 recording, dubbed the "Dumplin' Remix".) | 2018 | |
| "Hey Howdy Hey" | Dolly Parton | Dolly Parton | Sha-Kon-O-Hey! Land of Blue Smoke | 2009 | |
| "Hey, Lucky Lady" | Dolly Parton | Dolly Parton | All I Can Do | 1976 | |
| "Hide Me Away" | Porter Wagoner and Dolly Parton | Dolly Parton | Porter & Dolly | 1980 | |
| "Hide Me Away" | Porter Wagoner and Dolly Parton | Dolly Parton | Just Between You and Me: The Complete Recordings, 1967–1976 | 2014 | |
| "High and Mighty" | Dolly Parton with the Christ Church Choir | Dolly Parton | Slow Dancing with the Moon | 1993 | |
| "High and Mighty" | Aaron Crisler featuring Dolly Parton | Dolly Parton | In Good Hands | 2003 | |
| "High Sierra" | Dolly Parton, Emmylou Harris and Dolly Parton | Harley Allen | Trio II | 1999 | |
| "Highlight of My Life" | Dolly Parton | Dolly Parton | Jolene | 1974 | |
| "Highway Headin' South" | Dolly Parton | Porter Wagoner | Love Is Like a Butterfly | 1974 | |
| "Hillbilly Willy" | Dolly Parton | Dolly Parton | As Long as I Love | 1970 | |
| "Hobo's Meditation" | Dolly Parton, Emmylou Harris and Linda Ronstadt | Jimmie Rodgers | Trio | 1987 | |
| "Hold Fast to the Right" | Dolly Parton | James D. Vaughan | Heartsongs: Live from Home | 1994 | |
| "Hold Me" | Dolly Parton | Dolly Parton | Dolly | 1975 | |
| "Holdin' on to You" | Dolly Parton | Dolly Parton | New Harvest...First Gathering | 1977 | |
| "Holdin' on to You" | Dolly Parton | Dolly Parton | Live at the Bottom Line | 2015 | |
| "Holdin' on to You" | Dolly Parton and Elle King | Dolly Parton | Dumplin' | 2018 | |
| "Holding Everything" | Dolly Parton with Kent Wells | Dolly Parton | Better Day | 2011 | |
| "Holding on to Nothin'" | Porter Wagoner and Dolly Parton | Jerry Chesnut | Just the Two of Us | 1968 | |
| "Holly Jolly Christmas" | Dolly Parton | Johnny Marks | A Holly Dolly Christmas | 2020 | |
| "Hollywood Potters" | Dolly Parton | Dolly Parton | Heartbreak Express | 1982 | |
| "Home" | Dolly Parton | Dolly Parton | Blue Smoke | 2014 | |
| "Home for Pete's Sake" | Dolly Parton | Rudy Preston | My Blue Ridge Mountain Boy | 1969 | |
| "Home Is Where the Hurt Is" | Porter Wagoner and Dolly Parton | Fred MacRae; Marge Barton | Just Between You and Me | 1968 | |
| "Honky Tonk Songs" | Dolly Parton | Dolly Parton | Hungry Again | 1998 | |
| "How Can I (Help You Forgive Me)" | Porter Wagoner and Dolly Parton | Porter Wagoner; Tom Pick | Say Forever You'll Be Mine | 1975 | |
| "How Close They Must Be" | Porter Wagoner and Dolly Parton | Porter Wagoner | We Found It | 1973 | |
| "How Does It Feel" | Dolly Parton | Dolly Parton | New Harvest...First Gathering | 1977 | |
| "How Does It Feel" | Dolly Parton | Dolly Parton | Live at the Boarding House | 2006 | |
| "How Does It Feel" | Dolly Parton | Dolly Parton | Live at the Bottom Line | 2015 | |
| "How Great Thou Art" | Dolly Parton | Stuart K. Hine | A Real Live Dolly | 1970 | |
| "How Great Thou Art" | Dolly Parton | Stuart K. Hine | The Golden Streets of Glory | 1971 | |
| "Hungry Again" | Dolly Parton | Dolly Parton | Hungry Again | 1998 | |
| "Hush-a-bye Hard Times" | Dolly Parton | Dolly Parton | 9 to 5 and Odd Jobs | 1980 | |
| "I Am a Rainbow" | Dolly Parton | Dolly Parton | I Believe in You | 2017 | |
| "I Am Always Waiting" | Porter Wagoner and Dolly Parton | Porter Wagoner | We Found It | 1973 | |
| "I Am Ready" | Dolly Parton | Rachel Parton Dennison | The Grass Is Blue | 1999 | |
| "I Am Strong" | The Grascals with Dolly Parton | Jamie Johnson; Susanne Mumpower-Johnson; Jenee Fleenor | Country Classics with a Bluegrass Spin (Note: The album also included an additional version of "I Am Strong" featuring Dolly Parton, the Oak Ridge Boys, Darryl Worley, Charlie Daniels, Terri Clark, Randy Owen, Steven Seagal, Tom T. Hall, Joe Nichols, and Ansley McLaurin.) | 2011 | |
| "I Believe" | Dolly Parton | Ervin Drake; Irvin Graham; Jimmy Shirl; Al Stillman | The Golden Streets of Glory | 1971 | |
| "I Believe in Santa Claus" | Kenny Rogers and Dolly Parton | Dolly Parton | Once Upon a Christmas | 1984 | |
| "I Believe in You" | Dolly Parton | Dolly Parton | I Believe in You | 2017 | |
| "I Can" | Porter Wagoner and Dolly Parton | Dolly Parton | Just the Two of Us | 1968 | |
| "I Can't Be True" | Dolly Parton | Dolly Parton | Real Love | 1985 | |
| "I Can't Help Myself (Sugar Pie, Honey Bunch)" | Dolly Parton | Brian Holland; Lamont Dozier; Eddie Holland | The Great Pretender | 1984 | |
| "I Can't Help Myself (Sugar Pie, Honey Bunch)" | Dolly Parton | Brian Holland; Lamont Dozier; Eddie Holland | Think About Love | 1986 | |
| "I Couldn't Wait Forever" | Dolly Parton | Dolly Parton; Bill Owens | As Long as I Love | 1970 | |
| "I Don't Believe You've Met My Baby" | Porter Wagoner and Dolly Parton | Autry Inman | Always, Always | 1969 | |
| "I Don't Believe You've Met My Baby" | Dolly Parton | Autry Inman | Little Sparrow | 2001 | |
| "I Don't Believe You've Met My Baby" | Dolly Parton | Autry Inman | Love Always: Live from Texas | 2009 | |
| "I Don't Care" | Dolly Parton | Dolly Parton | "The Fall" B-side | 2021 | |
| "I Don't Trust Me Around You" | Dolly Parton | Bill Owens | As Long as I Love | 1970 | |
| "I Don't Want to Throw Rice" | Dolly Parton | Dolly Parton; Bill Owens | Hello, I'm Dolly | 1967 | |
| "I Don't Want You Around Me Anymore" | Dolly Parton | Dolly Parton; Bill Owens | As Long as I Love | 1970 | |
| "I Dreamed of a Hillbilly Heaven" | Dolly Parton, Loretta Lynn and Tammy Wynette | Hal Southern; Eddie Dean | Honky Tonk Angels | 1993 | |
| "I Feel the Blues Movin' In" | Dolly Parton, Emmylou Harris and Dolly Parton | Del McCoury | Trio II | 1999 | |
| "I Forgot More Than You'll Ever Know" | Dolly Parton, Loretta Lynn and Tammy Wynette | Cecil Null | Honky Tonk Angels | 1993 | |
| "If You Hadn't Been There" | Dolly Parton | Dolly Parton | | 2025 | |
| "I Get a Kick Out of You" | Dolly Parton | Cole Porter | Little Sparrow | 2001 | |
| "I Get Lonesome by Myself" | Porter Wagoner and Dolly Parton | Dolly Parton | Love and Music | 1973 | |
| "I Have No Right to Care" | Porter Wagoner and Dolly Parton | Dolly Parton | Say Forever You'll Be Mine | 1975 | |
| "I Hope You're Never Happy" | Dolly Parton | Dolly Parton | Real Love | 1985 | |
| "I Hope You're Never Happy" | Dolly Parton and Billy Dean | Dolly Parton | Blue Valley Songbird | 1999 | |
| "I Just Might" | Dolly Parton | Dolly Parton | Better Day | 2011 | |
| "I Keep Intending to Tell You" | Dolly Parton | Harry Mills | Wanted | 2010 | |
| "I Know You by Heart" | Dolly Parton duet with Smokey Robinson | George Merrill; Shannon Rubicam; Dean Pitchford | Rainbow | 1987 | |
| "I Knew You When" | Dolly Parton | Rupert Holmes | Dolly, Dolly, Dolly | 1980 | |
| "I Know You're Married But I Love You Still" | Porter Wagoner and Dolly Parton | Don Reno; Mack Magaha | Once More | 1970 | |
| "I Learned It Well" | Porter Wagoner and Dolly Parton | Linda Carol Moore | Just Between You and Me: The Complete Recordings, 1967–1976 | 2014 | |
| "I Never Will Marry" | Linda Ronstadt with Dolly Parton | Traditional arr. by Linda Ronstadt | Simple Dreams | 1977 | |
| "I Really Got the Feeling" | Dolly Parton | Billy Vera | Heartbreaker | 1978 | |
| "I Really Don't Want to Know" | Dolly Parton with Willie Nelson | Don Robertson; Howard Barnes | Burlap & Satin | 1983 | |
| "I Remember" | Dolly Parton | Dolly Parton | My Tennessee Mountain Home | 1973 | |
| "I Saw Mommy Kissing Santa Claus" | Dolly Parton | Tommie Connor | A Holly Dolly Christmas | 2020 | |
| "I Still Believe" | Dolly Parton | Dolly Parton | A Holly Dolly Christmas | 2020 | |
| "I Still Lost You" | Dolly Parton | Dolly Parton | Hungry Again | 1998 | |
| "I Still Miss Someone" | Dolly Parton | John R. Cash; Roy Cash Jr. | The Grass Is Blue | 1999 | |
| "I Still Miss Someone" | Martina McBride with Dolly Parton | John R. Cash; Roy Cash Jr. | Timeless | 2005 | |
| "I Took Him for Granted" | Dolly Parton | Bill Owens; Dolly Parton | "Busy Signal" B-side | 1966 | |
| "I Walk the Line" | Dolly Parton | Johnny Cash | The Great Pretender | 1984 | |
| "I Wanna Fall in Love" | Dolly Parton | Dolly Parton | Heartbreaker | 1978 | |
| "I Wanna Fall in Love" | Dolly Parton | Dolly Parton | Dance with Dolly | 1978 | |
| "I Wanna Go Back There" | Dolly Parton | Dolly Parton | Hungry Again | 1998 | |
| "I Want to Be What You Need" | Dolly Parton | Dolly Parton | The Bargain Store | 1975 | |
| "I Washed My Face in the Morning Dew" | Porter Wagoner and Dolly Parton | Tom T. Hall | Just the Two of Us | 1968 | |
| "I Wasted My Tears" | Dolly Parton | Dolly Parton; Bill Owens | Hello, I'm Dolly | 1967 | |
| "I Will Always Love You" | Dolly Parton | Dolly Parton | Jolene | 1974 | |
| "I Will Always Love You" | Dolly Parton | Dolly Parton | The Best Little Whorehouse in Texas | 1982 | |
| "I Will Always Love You" | Dolly Parton | Dolly Parton | Heartsong | 1994 | |
| "I Will Always Love You" | Dolly Parton with special guest Vince Gill | Dolly Parton | Something Special | 1995 | |
| "I Will Always Love You" | Dolly Parton | Dolly Parton | Live and Well | 2004 | |
| "I Will Always Love You" | Jerry D featuring Dolly Parton | Dolly Parton | Sax in the Country | 2005 | |
| "I Will Always Love You" | Dolly Parton | Dolly Parton | Live at the Boarding House | 2006 | |
| "I Will Always Love You" | Dolly Parton | Dolly Parton | Singer, Songwriter & Legendary Performer | 2007 | |
| "I Will Always Love You" | Dolly Parton | Dolly Parton | Backwoods Barbie | 2008 | |
| "I Will Always Love You" | Dolly Parton | Dolly Parton | Love Always: Live from Texas | 2009 | |
| "I Will Always Love You" | Stephanie J. Block with Dolly Parton | Dolly Parton | This Place I Know | 2009 | |
| "I Will Always Love You" | Dolly Parton | Dolly Parton | Live from London | 2009 | |
| "I Will Always Love You" | Erinn Abu featuring Dolly Parton | Dolly Parton | Forever in Love | 2012 | |
| "I Will Always Love You" | Erinn Abu featuring Dolly Parton | Dolly Parton | A New Creation | 2012 | |
| "I Will Always Love You" | Lulu Roman featuring Dolly Parton | Dolly Parton | At Last | 2013 | |
| "I Will Always Love You" | Dolly Parton | Dolly Parton | Live at the Bottom Line | 2015 | |
| "I Will Always Love You" | Dolly Parton | Dolly Parton | Live from Glastonbury 2014 | 2016 | |
| "I Will Always Love You" | Michael Bolton featuring Dolly Parton | Dolly Parton | Songs of Cinema | 2017 | |
| "I Will Always Love You" | Kristin Chenoweth featuring Dolly Parton | Dolly Parton | For the Girls | 2019 | |
| "I Will Forever Hate Roses" | Dolly Parton | Dolly Parton | Backwoods Barbie | 2008 | |
| "I Wish I Felt This Way at Home" | Dolly Parton | Harlan Howard | Just Because I'm a Woman | 1968 | |
| "I Wonder Where You Are Tonight" | Dolly Parton | Johnny Bond | The Grass Is Blue | 1999 | |
| "I Wound Easy" | Dolly Parton | Bill Owens | As Long as I Love | 1970 | |
| "I'd Like to Spend Christmas with Santa" | Dolly Parton | Dolly Parton; Bill Owens | A Smoky Mountain Christmas | 1986 | |
| "I'll Be Home for Christmas" | Dolly Parton | Kim Gannon; Walter Kent | Home for Christmas | 1990 | |
| "I'll Introduce You" | Billy Earl and the Kinfolks with Dolly Parton | Lowell Lundstrum | Dolly Parton Presents Billy Earl and the Kinfolks | | |
| "I'll Keep Climbing" | Dolly Parton | Dorothy Jo Hope | The Golden Streets of Glory | 1971 | |
| "I'll Make Your Bed" | Dolly Parton | Dolly Parton | Slow Dancing with the Moon | 1993 | |
| "I'll Never Forget" | Dolly Parton | Dolly Parton | The Bargain Store | 1975 | |
| "I'll Never Say Goodbye" | Dolly Parton | Dolly Parton | Hungry Again | 1998 | |
| "I'll Never Say Goodbye" | The Stevens Sisters with Dolly Parton and Douglas Stevens | Dolly Parton | Little by Little | 2002 | |
| "I'll Oilwells Love You" | Dolly Parton | Bill Owens; Dolly Parton | Just Because I'm a Woman | 1968 | |
| "I'll Put It Off Until Tomorrow" | Dolly Parton | Dolly Parton; Bill Owens | "The Little Things" B-side | 1967 | |
| "I'll Remember You as Mine" | Dolly Parton | Dolly Parton | Dolly | 1975 | |
| "I'm a Drifter" | Dolly Parton | Dolly Parton | All I Can Do | 1976 | |
| "I'm Doing This for Your Sake" | Dolly Parton | Dolly Parton | The Fairest of Them All | 1970 | |
| "I'm Fed Up with You" | Dolly Parton | Bill Owens | My Blue Ridge Mountain Boy | 1969 | |
| "I'm Gone" | Dolly Parton | Dolly Parton | Halos & Horns | 2002 | |
| "I'm Gone" | Dolly Parton | Dolly Parton | Live and Well | 2004 | |
| "I'm Gonna Sleep with One Eye Open" | Dolly Parton | Lester Flatt | The Grass Is Blue | 1999 | |
| "I'm Gonna Miss You" | Dolly Parton | Dolly Parton | For God and Country | 2003 | |
| "I'm Here" | Dolly Parton | Dolly Parton | I Believe in You | 2017 | |
| "I'm in No Condition" | Dolly Parton | Dolly Parton | Hello, I'm Dolly | 1967 | |
| "I'm Not Worth the Tears" | Dolly Parton | Dolly Parton | As Long as I Love | 1970 | |
| "I'm Running Out of Love" | Dolly Parton | Bill Owens | Just Because I'm a Woman | 1968 | |
| "I'm Sixteen" | Dolly Parton | Dolly Parton | Pure & Simple | 2016 | |
| "I'm Thinking Tonight of My Blue Eyes" | Dolly Parton | Traditional arr. by Dolly Parton | Heartsongs: Live from Home | 1994 | |
| "I'm Wasting Your Time and You're Wasting Mine" | Porter Wagoner and Dolly Parton | Dolly Parton | Porter Wayne and Dolly Rebecca | 1970 | |
| "I've Been Married (Just as Long as You Have)" | Porter Wagoner and Dolly Parton | Porter Wagoner; Dolly Parton | We Found It | 1973 | |
| "I've Been This Way Too Long" | Porter Wagoner and Dolly Parton | Dolly Parton | The Right Combination • Burning the Midnight Oil | 1972 | |
| "I've Had Enough" | Dolly Parton, Emmylou Harris and Linda Ronstadt | Kate McGarrigle | Trio | 1987 | |
| "I've Had Enough" | Dolly Parton, Emmylou Harris and Linda Ronstadt | Kate McGarrigle | The Complete Trio Collection | 2016 | |
| "I've Known You All My Life" | Dolly Parton | Gerry Goffin; Carole King | Dolly | 2009 | |
| "I've Lived My Life" | Dolly Parton | Lola Jean Dillon | Hello, I'm Dolly | 1967 | |
| "If" | Dolly Parton | David Gates | Halos & Horns | 2002 | |
| "If" | Dolly Parton | David Gates | Live and Well | 2004 | |
| "If I Cross Your Mind" | Dolly Parton | Porter Wagoner | Love Is Like a Butterfly | 1974 | |
| "If I Had Wings" | Dolly Parton | Dolly Parton | Blue Smoke | 2014 | |
| "If I Lose" | Herb Pedersen with the Howdy-Cracker Vocal Revue (Note: Dennis Brooks, Dolly Parton, Gene Moreford, Jill Gordon, "Little Joey" Scarbury, Johnny Rivers, Linda Ronstadt, Lowell George, and Michael McGinnis.) | Ralph Stanley | Sandman | 1977 | |
| "If I Lose My Mind" | Dolly Parton | Porter Wagoner | Coat of Many Colors | 1971 | |
| "If I Said You Had a Beautiful Body (Would You Hold It Against Me)" | The Bellamy Brothers with Dolly Parton | David Bellamy | Angels & Outlaws, Vol. 1 | 2005 | |
| "If I Were a Carpenter" | Dolly Parton with special guest Joe Nichols | James Timothy Hardin | Those Were the Days | 2005 | |
| "If It's All the Same to You" | Bill Anderson with Dolly Parton | Bill Anderson | The First 10 Years, 1956–1966 | 2011 | |
| "If Only" | Dolly Parton | Dolly Parton | Halos & Horns | 2002 | |
| "If We Don't" | Dolly Parton and Rhonda Vincent with Alison Krauss | Dolly Parton; Linda Perry | Dumplin' | 2018 | |
| "If You Ain't Got Love" | Dolly Parton | Dolly Parton | The Beverly Hillbillies | 1993 | |
| "If You Go, I'll Follow You" | Porter Wagoner and Dolly Parton | Dolly Parton; Porter Wagoner | Porter & Dolly | 1980 | |
| "If You Go, I'll Follow You" | Porter Wagoner and Dolly Parton | Dolly Parton; Porter Wagoner | Just Between You and Me: The Complete Recordings, 1967–1976 | 2014 | |
| "If You Need Me" | Dolly Parton | Dolly Parton | Eagle When She Flies | 1991 | |
| "If You Were Mine" | Porter Wagoner and Dolly Parton | Randy Parton | Say Forever You'll Be Mine | 1975 | |
| "If You Say I Can" | Porter Wagoner and Dolly Parton | Dolly Parton | "Is Forever Longer Than Always" B-side | 1976 | |
| "If You Say I Can" | Porter Wagoner and Dolly Parton | Dolly Parton | Porter & Dolly (Note: Overdubbed version of the recording released in 1976 as the B-side of "Is Forever Longer Than Always".) | 1980 | |
| "Imagination" | Dolly Parton | Dolly Parton | I Believe in You | 2017 | |
| "In a Deep Sleep" | Dolly Parton, Emmylou Harris and Linda Ronstadt | Triona Ni Dhomhnaill | The Complete Trio Collection | 2016 | |
| "In Each Love Some Pain Must Fall" | Porter Wagoner and Dolly Parton | Dolly Parton | The Right Combination • Burning the Midnight Oil | 1972 | |
| "In the Garden" | Dolly Parton | C. Austin Miles | Precious Memories | 1999 | |
| "In the Garden by the Fountain" | Rhonda Vincent with special guest Dolly Parton | Roger Brown | Taken | 2010 | |
| "In the Ghetto" | Dolly Parton | Mac Davis | My Blue Ridge Mountain Boy | 1969 | |
| "In the Good Old Days (When Times Were Bad)" | Dolly Parton | Dolly Parton | In the Good Old Days (When Times Were Bad) | 1969 | |
| "In the Good Old Days (When Times Were Bad)" | Dolly Parton | Dolly Parton | My Tennessee Mountain Home | 1973 | |
| "In the Meantime" | Dolly Parton | Dolly Parton | Better Day | 2011 | |
| "In the Morning" | Dolly Parton | Dolly Parton | Just Between You and Me: The Complete Recordings, 1967–1976 | 2014 | |
| "In the Pines" | Dolly Parton | Traditional arr. by Dolly Parton | Heartsongs: Live from Home | 1994 | |
| "In the Presence of You" | Porter Wagoner and Dolly Parton | Porter Wagoner | Love and Music | 1973 | |
| "In the Sweet By-and-By" | Dolly Parton | S. Fillmore Bennett; Joseph P. Webster | Precious Memories | 1999 | |
| "In the Sweet By-and-By" | Dolly Parton | S. Fillmore Bennett; Joseph P. Webster | Little Sparrow | 2001 | |
| "In the Sweet By-and-By" | Dolly Parton with Larry Cordle, Carl Jackson, Jerry Salley, and Bradley Walker | S. Fillmore Bennett; Joseph P. Webster | Country Faith Bluegrass | 2021 | |
| "Imagine" | Dolly Parton with special guest David Foster | John Lennon | Those Were the Days | 2005 | |
| "Is Forever Longer Than Always" | Porter Wagoner and Dolly Parton | Porter Wagoner; Frank Dycus | Single A-side | 1976 | |
| "Is It Real" | Porter Wagoner and Dolly Parton | Dolly Parton | Two of a Kind | 1971 | |
| "Islands in the Stream" | Kenny Rogers duet with Dolly Parton | Barry Gibb; Robin Gibb; Maurice Gibb | Eyes That See in the Dark | 1983 | |
| "Islands in the Stream" | Dolly Parton | Barry Gibb; Robin Gibb; Maurice Gibb | Live and Well | 2004 | |
| "Islands in the Stream" | Dolly Parton with Richard Dennison | Barry Gibb; Robin Gibb; Maurice Gibb | Live from London | 2009 | |
| "Islands in the Stream" | Dolly Parton with Richard Dennison | Barry Gibb; Robin Gibb; Maurice Gibb | Live from Glastonbury 2014 | 2016 | |
| "It Ain't Fair That It Ain't Right" | Dolly Parton | Janice Eggers; Bob Eggers | Joshua | 1971 | |
| "It Looked Good on Paper" | Randy Kohrs duet with Dolly Parton | Carl Jackson; Pam Tillis | I'm Torn | 2004 | |
| "It Might as Well Be Me" | Porter Wagoner and Dolly Parton | Dolly Parton; Dorothy Jo Hope | Porter Wayne and Dolly Rebecca | 1970 | |
| "It Must Be You" | Dolly Parton | Blaise Tosti | Jolene | 1974 | |
| "It Wasn't God Who Made Honky Tonk Angels" | Dolly Parton | J.D. Miller | Hits Made Famous by Country Queens | 1963 | |
| "It Wasn't God Who Made Honky Tonk Angels" | Dolly Parton, Loretta Lynn and Tammy Wynette with special guest, Kitty Wells | J.D. Miller | Honky Tonk Angels | 1993 | |
| "It's All Wrong, But It's All Right" | Dolly Parton | Dolly Parton | Here You Come Again | 1977 | |
| "It's My Time" | Dolly Parton | John D. Loudermilk | In the Good Old Days (When Times Were Bad) | 1969 | |
| "It's Not My Affair Anymore" | Dolly Parton | Jeanne French | Great Balls of Fire | 1979 | |
| "It's Such a Heartache" | Dolly Parton | Even Stevens; Hillary Kanter | Real Love | 1985 | |
| "It's Sure Gonna Hurt" | Dolly Parton with the Merry Melody Singers | Dolly Parton; Bill Owens | Single A-side | 1962 | |
| "It's Too Late" | Dolly Parton | Ron Davies | Unsung Hero: A Tribute to the Music of Ron Davies | 2013 | |
| "It's Too Late to Love Me Now" | Dolly Parton | Rory Bourke; Gene Dobbins; Johnny Wilson | Heartbreaker | 1978 | |
| "J.J. Sneed" | Dolly Parton | Dolly Parton; Dorothy Jo Hope | Joshua | 1971 | |
| "J.J. Sneed" | Dolly Parton | Dolly Parton; Dorothy Jo Hope | Dolly Parton's Heartstrings | 2019 | |
| "Jealous Heart" | Dolly Parton | Dolly Parton | Burlap & Satin | 1983 | |
| "Jeannie's Afraid of the Dark" | Porter Wagoner and Dolly Parton | Dolly Parton | Just the Two of Us | 1968 | |
| "Jeannie's Afraid of the Dark" | Porter Wagoner and Dolly Parton | Dolly Parton | A Real Live Dolly | 1970 | |
| "Jesus & Gravity" | Dolly Parton | Craig Wiseman; Betsy Ulmer | Backwoods Barbie | 2008 | |
| "Jesus & Gravity" | Dolly Parton | Craig Wiseman; Betsy Ulmer | Live from London | 2009 | |
| "Jingle Bells" | Dolly Parton | James Lord Pierpont arr. by the Mighty Fine Band | Home for Christmas | 1990 | |
| "John Daniel" | Dolly Parton | Dolly Parton | Halos & Horns | 2002 | |
| "Jolene" (Note: A dance remix of "Jolene " by Destructo was released in 2021.) | Dolly Parton | Dolly Parton | Jolene | 1974 | |
| "Jolene" | Dolly Parton | Dolly Parton | In Concert with Host Charley Pride | 1975 | |
| "Jolene" | Dolly Parton | Dolly Parton | Something Special | 1995 | |
| "Jolene" | Mindy Smith with Dolly Parton | Dolly Parton | One Moment More | 2004 | |
| "Jolene" | Dolly Parton | Dolly Parton | Live and Well | 2004 | |
| "Jolene" | Dolly Parton | Dolly Parton | Live at the Boarding House | 2006 | |
| "Jolene" | Dolly Parton | Dolly Parton | Great Ladies of the Opry | 2006 | |
| "Jolene" | Dolly Parton | Dolly Parton | Singer, Songwriter & Legendary Performer (Note: This live recording would later be included as a bonus track on the Target edition of Parton's 2008 album, Backwoods Barbie.) | 2007 | |
| "Jolene" | Dolly Parton | Dolly Parton | Live from London | 2009 | |
| "Jolene" | Straight No Chaser featuring Dolly Parton | Dolly Parton | Under the Influence | 2013 | |
| "Jolene" | Dolly Parton | Dolly Parton | Live at the Bottom Line | 2015 | |
| "Jolene" | Mary Sarah and Dolly Parton | Dolly Parton | Bridges | 2014 | |
| "Jolene" | Dolly Parton | Dolly Parton | The Blacklist (Note: The soundtrack to the TV series The Blacklist featured a slowed down version of Parton's 1974 recording of "Jolene".) | 2015 | |
| "Jolene" | Dolly Parton | Dolly Parton | Live from Glastonbury 2014 | 2016 | |
| "Jolene" | Pentatonix featuring Dolly Parton | Dolly Parton | PTX, Vol. IV - Classics | 2017 | |
| "Jolene" | Dolly Parton | Dolly Parton | Dumplin' (Note: In addition to the newly recorded "String Version" of "Jolene", the version of the album released to streaming services also features a remix of Parton's original 1974 recording, dubbed the "Dumplin' Remix".) | 2018 | |
| "Jolene" | Dolly Parton | Dolly Parton | Dolly Parton's Heartstrings | 2019 | |
| "Joshua" | Dolly Parton | Dolly Parton | Joshua | 1971 | |
| "Joy to the World" | Dolly Parton | Isaac Watts arr. by the Mighty Fine Band | Home for Christmas | 1990 | |
| "Just as Good as Gone" | Dolly Parton | Dolly Parton | Coat of Many Colors | 2007 | |
| "Just Because I'm a Woman" | Dolly Parton | Dolly Parton | Just Because I'm a Woman | 1968 | |
| "Just Because I'm a Woman" | Dolly Parton | Dolly Parton | Just Because I'm a Woman: Songs of Dolly Parton | 2003 | |
| "Just Because I'm a Woman" | Dolly Parton | Dolly Parton | A Real Live Dolly | 2009 | |
| "Just Between You and Me" | Porter Wagoner and Dolly Parton | Jack Clement | Just Between You and Me | 1968 | |
| "Just Leaving" | Dolly Parton | Dolly Parton | Better Day | 2011 | |
| "Just Someone I Used to Know" | Porter Wagoner and Dolly Parton | Jack Clement | Porter Wayne and Dolly Rebecca | 1970 | |
| "Just the Two of Us" | Porter Wagoner and Dolly Parton | Jerry Chesnut | Just the Two of Us | 1968 | |
| "Just the Way I Am" | Dolly Parton | Dolly Parton | The Fairest of Them All | 1970 | |
| "Just When I Needed You Most" | Dolly Parton | Randy VanWarmer | Treasures | 1996 | |
| "Keep on the Firing Line" | Dolly Parton | Bessie F. Hatcher | Precious Memories | 1999 | |
| "Kentucky Gambler" | Dolly Parton | Dolly Parton | The Bargain Store | 1975 | |
| "King of the Road" | Willie Nelson, Merle Haggard, Kris Kristofferson, Dolly Parton, Eric Church, Randy Travis, Lily Meola, Dwight Yoakam, Bill Anderson, Glen Phillips, Radney Foster, Emmylou Harris, Jamey Johnson, Alison Krauss, Ronnie Dunn, Flatt Lonesome, Dean Miller, Shawn Camp, Mandy Barnett, and Brenda Lee | Roger Miller | King of the Road: A Tribute to Roger Miller | 2018 | |
| "Kiss It (And Make It All Better)" | Dolly Parton | Dolly Parton | Pure & Simple | 2016 | |
| "Knockin' on Heaven's Door" | Ladysmith Black Mambazo featuring Dolly Parton | Bob Dylan | Heavenly | 1997 | |
| "Last Night's Lovin'" | Dolly Parton | Dolly Parton | Jolene | 2007 | |
| "Laugh the Years Away" | Porter Wagoner and Dolly Parton | Howard Tuck | Love and Music | 1973 | |
| "Lay Your Hands on Me" | Dolly Parton | Jon Bon Jovi; Richie Sambora | Blue Smoke | 2014 | |
| "Lay Your Hands on Me" | Dolly Parton featuring Richie Sambora | Jon Bon Jovi; Richie Sambora | Live from Glastonbury 2014 | 2016 | |
| "Leave That Cowboy Alone" | Dolly Parton and Ray Benson | Dolly Parton; Ray Benson | Wild Texas Wind | 1991 | |
| "Leave That Cowboy Alone" | Ray Benson featuring Dolly Parton | Dolly Parton; Ray Benson | Beyond Time | 2003 | |
| "Let Her Fly" | Dolly Parton, Loretta Lynn and Tammy Wynette | Dolly Parton | Honky Tonk Angels | 1993 | |
| "Let Love Grow" | Dolly Parton | Dolly Parton | Better Day | 2011 | |
| "Let's Live for Tonight" | Porter Wagoner and Dolly Parton | Don Reno | Once More | 1970 | |
| "Letter to Heaven" | Dolly Parton | arr. by David Kleiber | Hits Made Famous by Country Queens | 1963 | |
| "Letter to Heaven" | Dolly Parton | arr. by Dolly Parton | Joshua | 1971 | |
| "Life Rides the Train" | Porter Wagoner and Dolly Parton | Porter Wagoner | Say Forever You'll Be Mine | 1975 | |
| "Life's Like Poetry" | Dolly Parton | Merle Haggard | All I Can Do | 1976 | |
| "Light of a Clear Blue Morning" | Dolly Parton | Dolly Parton | New Harvest...First Gathering | 1977 | |
| "Light of a Clear Blue Morning" | Dolly Parton | Dolly Parton | Straight Talk (Note: The soundtrack to the 1992 film, Straight Talk, features a short reprise of "Light of a Clear Blue Morning" in addition to the full length version.) | 1992 | |
| "Light of a Clear Blue Morning" | Dolly Parton | Dolly Parton | For God and Country | 2003 | |
| "Light of a Clear Blue Morning" | Dolly Parton | Dolly Parton | Live at the Boarding House | 2006 | |
| "Light of a Clear Blue Morning" | Dolly Parton | Dolly Parton | Live at the Bottom Line | 2015 | |
| "Light of the Stable" | Emmylou Harris with Dolly Parton, Linda Ronstadt and Neil Young | Steven Rhymer; Elizabeth Rhymer | Light of the Stable | 1979 | |
| "Listen to the Mockingbird" | Stuart Duncan featuring Dolly Parton | Septimus Winner; Richard Milburn | Divided & United: The Songs of the Civil War | 2013 | |
| "Little Bird" | Dolly Parton | Dolly Parton | In the Good Old Days (When Times Were Bad) | 1969 | |
| "Little Bit Slow to Catch On" | Dolly Parton | Curly Putman | Just Because I'm a Woman | 1968 | |
| "Little Blossom" | Dolly Parton | arr. by David Kleiber | Hits Made Famous by Country Queens | 1963 | |
| "Little David's Harp" | Porter Wagoner and Dolly Parton | Dolly Parton | Porter & Dolly | 1980 | |
| "Little David's Harp" | Porter Wagoner and Dolly Parton | Dolly Parton | Just Between You and Me: The Complete Recordings, 1967–1976 | 2014 | |
| "Little Rosewood Casket" (Note: See also: "Rosewood Casket".) | Dolly Parton | Traditional | On Top of Old Smoky: New Old-Time Smoky Mountain Music | 2016 | |
| "Little Sparrow" | Dolly Parton | Dolly Parton | Little Sparrow (Note: The album also includes a short reprise of "Little Sparrow" in addition to the full length version.) | 2001 | |
| "Little Sparrow" | Dolly Parton | Dolly Parton | Live and Well | 2004 | |
| "Little Sparrow" | Dolly Parton | Dolly Parton | Singer, Songwriter & Legendary Performer | 2007 | |
| "Little Sparrow" | Dolly Parton | Dolly Parton | Love Always: Live from Texas | 2009 | |
| "Little Sparrow" | Dolly Parton | Dolly Parton | Live from London | 2009 | |
| "Livin' a Lie" | Dolly Parton | Dolly Parton | Straight Talk | 1992 | |
| "Living on Memories of You" | Dolly Parton | Dolly Parton | Jolene | 1974 | |
| "Loneliness Found Me" | Dolly Parton | Porter Wagoner | Touch Your Woman | 1972 | |
| "Lonely Comin' Down" | Dolly Parton | Porter Wagoner | My Favorite Songwriter, Porter Wagoner (Note: This recording of "Lonely Comin' Down" would also be included on Parton's 1974 album, Jolene.) | 1972 | |
| "Longer Than Always" | Dolly Parton | Dolly Parton | Heartsongs: Live from Home | 1994 | |
| "Look on the Bright Side" | Dolly Parton | Dolly Parton | A Smoky Mountain Christmas | 1986 | |
| "Looking Down" | Porter Wagoner and Dolly Parton | Porter Wagoner | Together Always | 1972 | |
| "Lord Hold My Hand" | Dolly Parton | Dolly Parton; Ginny Dean | The Golden Streets of Glory | 1971 | |
| "Lost and Found" | Dolly Parton featuring Joe Nichols | Dolly Parton | Run, Rose, Run | 2022 | |
| "Lost Forever in Your Kiss" | Porter Wagoner and Dolly Parton | Dolly Parton | Together Always | 1972 | |
| "Love and Forgiveness" | Dolly Parton | Dolly Parton | Dolly Parton's Christmas of Many Colors: Circle of Love | 2016 | |
| "Love and Learn" | Dolly Parton | Bill Owens | Just Because I'm a Woman | 1968 | |
| "If Teardrops Were Pennies" | Porter Wagoner and Dolly Parton | Carl Butler | Love and Music | 1973 | |
| "Love City" | Porter Wagoner and Dolly Parton | Porter Wagoner; Tom Pick | We Found It | 1973 | |
| "Love Have Mercy on Us" | Porter Wagoner and Dolly Parton | Dolly Parton | We Found It | 1973 | |
| "Love Is Here to Stay" | Michael Feinstein | George Gershwin; Ira Gershwin | Gershwin Country | 2022 | |
| "Love Is Like a Butterfly" | Dolly Parton | Dolly Parton | Love Is Like a Butterfly | 1974 | |
| "Love Is Like a Butterfly" | Dolly Parton | Dolly Parton | In Concert with Host Charley Pride | 1975 | |
| "Love Is Like a Butterfly" | Dolly Parton | Dolly Parton | Heartsong | 1994 | |
| "Love Is Like a Butterfly" | Dolly Parton | Dolly Parton | Live at the Bottom Line | 2015 | |
| "Love Is Like a Butterfly" | Deana Carter featuring Dolly Parton | Dolly Parton | The Chain | 2007 | |
| "Love Is Only as Strong (As Your Weakest Moment)" | Dolly Parton | Bill Owens | Touch Your Woman | 1972 | |
| "Love Is Out Tonight" | Porter Wagoner and Dolly Parton | Porter Wagoner; Tom Pick | Love and Music | 1973 | |
| "Love Is Strange" | Kenny Rogers duet with Dolly Parton | Ellas McDaniel; Mickey Baker; Sylvia Robinson | Love Is Strange | 1990 | |
| "Love Is Worth Living" | Porter Wagoner and Dolly Parton | Dolly Parton | Just Between You and Me | 1968 | |
| "Love Isn't Free" | Dolly Parton | Dolly Parton | Touch Your Woman | 1972 | |
| "Love or Lust" | Dolly Parton featuring Richard Dennison | Dolly Parton | Run, Rose, Run | 2022 | |
| "Love to Remember" | Dolly Parton | Dolly Parton | The Bargain Store | 1975 | |
| "Love to See Us Through" | Porter Wagoner and Dolly Parton | Al Gore; Frank Dycus | Say Forever You'll Be Mine | 1975 | |
| "Love with Feeling" | Dolly Parton | Porter Wagoner | "The Seeker" B-side | 1975 | |
| "Love with Me" | Dolly Parton | Dolly Parton | Bubbling Over | 1973 | |
| "Love, You're So Beautiful Tonight" | Dolly Parton | Porter Wagoner | Bubbling Over | 1973 | |
| "Love's All Over" | Porter Wagoner and Dolly Parton | Porter Wagoner | Together Always | 1972 | |
| "Lover du Jour" | Dolly Parton | Dolly Parton | Blue Smoke | 2014 | |
| "Lover's Return" | Dolly Parton, Emmylou Harris and Dolly Parton | A.P. Carter; Maybelle Carter; Sara Carter | Trio II | 1999 | |
| "Lover's Return" | Dolly Parton, Emmylou Harris and Dolly Parton | A.P. Carter; Maybelle Carter; Sara Carter | The Complete Trio Collection | 2016 | |
| "Lovesick Blues" | Dolly Parton, Loretta Lynn and Tammy Wynette with special guest, Patsy Cline | Cliff Friend; Irving Mills | Honky Tonk Angels | 1993 | |
| "Lovin' You" | Dolly Parton | John Sebastian | Here You Come Again | 1977 | |
| "Lovin' You" | Dolly Parton | Dolly Parton | Pure & Simple | 2016 | |
| "Loving You Too Well" | Ralph Stanley with Dolly Parton | Carter Stanley | Clinch Mountain Sweethearts | 2001 | |
| "Made for Loving You" | Curly Putman with Dolly Parton | Curly Putman; Sonny Throckmorton | Write 'Em Sad–Sing 'Em Lonesome | 2010 | |
| "Made of Stone" | Dolly Parton | Dolly Parton | Backwoods Barbie | 2008 | |
| "Malena" | Porter Wagoner and Dolly Parton | Dolly Parton | Always, Always | 1969 | |
| "Make Love Work" | Dolly Parton | Eric Kaz | Rainbow | 1987 | |
| "Makin' Fun Ain't Funny" | Dolly Parton | Dolly Parton | Promotional single (Note: In 2016, Parton re-released her children's book, Coat of Many Colors, based on her hit song of the same name. This new version of the book featured new cover art and illustrations, as well as a free download of the song "Makin' Fun Ain't Funny". This version of the song features different instrumentation than the version featured on the 2017 album, I Believe in You.) | 2016 | |
| "Makin' Fun Ain't Funny" | Dolly Parton | Dolly Parton | I Believe in You | 2017 | |
| "Making Believe" | Dolly Parton | Jimmy Work | Hits Made Famous by Country Queens | 1963 | |
| "Making Plans" | Porter Wagoner and Dolly Parton | Johnny Russell; Voni Morrison | Porter & Dolly | 1980 | |
| "Making Plans" | Dolly Parton, Emmylou Harris and Linda Ronstadt | Johnny Russell; Voni Morrison | Trio | 1987 | |
| "Making Plans" | Johnny Russell featuring Dolly Parton | Johnny Russell; Voni Morrison | Actin' Naturally | 2000 | |
| "Making Plans" | Porter Wagoner and Dolly Parton | Johnny Russell; Voni Morrison | Just Between You and Me: The Complete Recordings, 1967–1976 | 2014 | |
| "Making Plans" | Dolly Parton, Emmylou Harris and Linda Ronstadt | Johnny Russell; Voni Morrison | The Complete Trio Collection | 2016 | |
| "Mama" | Dolly Parton | Dolly Parton | Pure & Simple | 2016 | |
| "Mama Say a Prayer" | Dolly Parton | Dolly Parton | In the Good Old Days (When Times Were Bad) | 1969 | |
| "Mammie" | Dolly Parton | Dolly Parton | The Fairest of Them All | 1970 | |
| "Marry Me" | Dolly Parton | Dolly Parton | Little Sparrow | 2001 | |
| "Marry Me" | Dolly Parton | Dolly Parton | Live and Well | 2004 | |
| "Marry Me" | Dolly Parton | Dolly Parton | Love Always: Live from Texas | 2009 | |
| "Mary, Did You Know?" | Dolly Parton | Mark Lowry; Buddy Greene | A Holly Dolly Christmas | 2020 | |
| "Mary of the Wild Moor" | Dolly Parton | Traditional arr. by Dolly Parton | Heartsongs: Live from Home | 1994 | |
| "Mathilda (I Cry and Cry for You)" | John Henry III and the Country Blues with Dolly Parton | George Khoury; Huey Thierry | Single A-side | 1970 | |
| "Me and Bobby McGee" | Dolly Parton with special guest Kris Kristofferson | Kris Kristofferson; Fred Foster | Those Were the Days | 2005 | |
| "Me and Little Andy" | Dolly Parton | Dolly Parton | Here You Come Again | 1977 | |
| "Me and Little Andy" | Dolly Parton | Dolly Parton | Live at the Boarding House | 2006 | |
| "Me and Little Andy" | Dolly Parton | Dolly Parton | Live at the Bottom Line | 2015 | |
| "Mendy Never Sleeps" | Porter Wagoner and Dolly Parton | Dolly Parton | Porter Wayne and Dolly Rebecca | 1970 | |
| "Milwaukee, Here I Come" | Porter Wagoner and Dolly Parton | Lee Fikes | Always, Always | 1969 | |
| "Mine" | Dolly Parton | Dolly Parton | In the Good Old Days (When Times Were Bad) | 1969 | |
| "Miss You–Miss Me" | Dolly Parton | Dolly Parton | Blue Smoke | 2014 | |
| "Mission Chapel Memories" | Dolly Parton | Porter Wagoner; Dolly Parton | Touch Your Woman | 1972 | |
| "Mister Sandman" | Emmylou Harris with Linda Ronstadt and Dolly Parton | Pat Ballard | Evangeline | 1981 | |
| "Mommie, Ain't That Daddy" | Porter Wagoner and Dolly Parton | Dolly Parton | Just Between You and Me | 1968 | |
| "More Power to Ya" | Stella Parton with Dolly Parton | Stella Parton; Dolly Parton | Mountain Songbird | 2016 | |
| "More Than I Can Say" | Dolly Parton | Dolly Parton | Rainbow | 1987 | |
| "More Than Their Share" | Dolly Parton | Dolly Parton | The Fairest of Them All | 1970 | |
| "More Than Words Can Tell" | Porter Wagoner and Dolly Parton | Porter Wagoner | The Right Combination • Burning the Midnight Oil | 1972 | |
| "More Where That Came From" | Dolly Parton | Dolly Parton | Slow Dancing with the Moon | 1993 | |
| "Most of All Why" | Dolly Parton | Dolly Parton | Dolly | 1975 | |
| "Most of All Why" | Holly Dunn with Dolly Parton | Dolly Parton | The Blue Rose of Texas | 1989 | |
| "Mother Church" (Note: This song was titled "Mother Church of Country Music" when released on Wagoner's 2007 compilation, Best of Grand Old Gospel 2008.) | Porter Wagoner and Friends (Note: Roy Acuff, Dolly Parton and others.) | Ronnie R. Smith | Pure Gold | 1991 | |
| "Mountain Angel" | Dolly Parton | Dolly Parton | Little Sparrow | 2001 | |
| "Mountain Angel" | Dolly Parton | Dolly Parton | Live and Well | 2004 | |
| "Mountain Angel" | Dolly Parton | Dolly Parton | Love Always: Live from Texas | 2009 | |
| "Mountain Magic" | Dolly Parton | Dolly Parton | A Smoky Mountain Christmas | 1986 | |
| "Mud Song" | Dolly Parton | Dolly Parton | Live from Glastonbury 2014 | 2016 | |
| "Mule Skinner Blues (Blue Yodel No. 8)" | Dolly Parton | Jimmie Rodgers; George Vaughn | The Best of Dolly Parton | 1970 | |
| "My Blue Ridge Mountain Boy" | Dolly Parton | Dolly Parton | My Blue Ridge Mountain Boy | 1969 | |
| "My Blue Ridge Mountain Boy" | Dolly Parton | Dolly Parton | A Real Live Dolly | 1970 | |
| "My Blue Ridge Mountain Boy" | Dolly Parton | Dolly Parton | Heartbreak Express | 1982 | |
| "My Blue Tears" | Dolly Parton | Dolly Parton | Coat of Many Colors | 1971 | |
| "My Blue Tears" | Linda Ronstadt with Emmylou Harris and Dolly Parton | Dolly Parton | Get Closer | 1982 | |
| "My Blue Tears" | Dolly Parton | Dolly Parton | Heartsongs: Live from Home | 1994 | |
| "My Blue Tears" | Dolly Parton | Dolly Parton | Blue Valley Songbird | 1999 | |
| "My Blue Tears" | Dolly Parton | Dolly Parton | Little Sparrow | 2001 | |
| "My Blue Tears" | Dolly Parton | Dolly Parton | Coat of Many Colors (Note: The 2007 reissue of Coat of Many Colors featured an acoustic demo recording of "My Blue Tears" in addition to the original album version.) | 2007 | |
| "My Blue Tears" | Dolly Parton, Emmylou Harris and Linda Ronstadt | Dolly Parton | The Complete Trio Collection | 2016 | |
| "My Country 'Tis" | Dolly Parton | Samuel Francis Smith arr. by Dolly Parton | For God and Country | 2003 | |
| "My Dear Companion" | Dolly Parton, Emmylou Harris and Linda Ronstadt | Jean Ritchie | Trio | 1987 | |
| "My Dear Companion" | Dolly Parton, Emmylou Harris and Linda Ronstadt | Jean Ritchie | The Complete Trio Collection | 2016 | |
| "My Eyes Can Only See You" | Dolly Parton | Dolly Parton | Love Is Like a Butterfly | 1974 | |
| "My Father's Daughter" | Jewel featuring Dolly Parton | Jewel Kilcher; Lisa Carver | Picking Up the Pieces | 2015 | |
| "My Girl (My Love)" | Dolly Parton | William Robinson; Ronald White | New Harvest...First Gathering | 1977 | |
| "My Hands Are Tied" | Porter Wagoner and Dolly Parton | Dolly Parton | Always, Always | 1969 | |
| "My Heart Started Breaking" | Dolly Parton | Dolly Parton | Dolly | 1975 | |
| "My Heart Started Breaking" | Dolly Parton | Dolly Parton | Coat of Many Colors | 2007 | |
| "My Kind of Man" | Dolly Parton | Dolly Parton | Bubbling Over | 1973 | |
| "My Mountains, My Home" | Dolly Parton | Dolly Parton | Sha-Kon-O-Hey! Land of Blue Smoke | 2009 | |
| "My Perfect Reason" | Bill Anderson featuring Dolly Parton | Bill Anderson; Clint Daniels | Whisperin' Bluegrass | 2007 | |
| "My Tennessee Hills" | Janis Ian with Dolly Parton | Janis Ian | Billie's Bones | 2004 | |
| "My Tennessee Mountain Home" | Dolly Parton | Dolly Parton | My Tennessee Mountain Home | 1973 | |
| "My Tennessee Mountain Home" | Dolly Parton | Dolly Parton | Heartsongs: Live from Home | 1994 | |
| "My Tennessee Mountain Home" | Dolly Parton | Dolly Parton | Live and Well | 2004 | |
| "My Tennessee Mountain Home" | Dolly Parton | Dolly Parton | Live at the Boarding House | 2006 | |
| "My Tennessee Mountain Home" | Dolly Parton | Dolly Parton | Rare Country Legends Live | 2009 | |
| "My Tennessee Mountain Home" | Dolly Parton | Dolly Parton | An Evening with Dolly | 2012 | |
| "My Tennessee Mountain Home" | Dolly Parton | Dolly Parton | Live at the Bottom Line | 2015 | |
| "Never Not Love You" | Dolly Parton | Dolly Parton | Pure & Simple | 2016 | |
| "Nickels and Dimes" | Dolly Parton | Dolly Parton; Floyd Parton | Heartbreaker | 1978 | |
| "Nickels and Dimes" | Dolly Parton | Dolly Parton; Floyd Parton | Dolly Parton's Christmas of Many Colors: Circle of Love | 2016 | |
| "Night Train to Memphis" | Dolly Parton | Marvin Huges; Owen Bradley; Beasley Smith | Heartsongs: Live from Home | 1994 | |
| "No Good Way of Saying Good-bye" | Dolly Parton | Dolly Parton | Something Special | 1995 | |
| "No Love Left" | Porter Wagoner and Dolly Parton | Bill Owens | Porter Wayne and Dolly Rebecca | 1970 | |
| "No Reason to Hurry Home" | Porter Wagoner and Dolly Parton | Dolly Parton | Always, Always | 1969 | |
| "Nobody But You" | Dolly Parton with the Merry Melody Singers | Marle Jones; Robert Stanley Riley Sr. | Dolly | 2009 | |
| "Not Enough" | Dolly Parton and Queen Latifah | Dolly Parton | Joyful Noise | 2012 | |
| "Not for Me" | Dolly Parton | Dolly Parton | Halos & Horns | 2002 | |
| "Not from My World" | Dolly Parton | Arthur Thomas | Wanted | 2010 | |
| "O Little Town of Bethlehem" | Dolly Parton | Phillips Brooks; Lewis Redner arr. by the Mighty Fine Band | Home for Christmas | 1990 | |
| "Oh, He's Everywhere" | Dolly Parton | Porter Wagoner | My Favorite Songwriter, Porter Wagoner | 1972 | |
| "Old Black Kettle" | Dolly Parton | Dolly Parton | My Tennessee Mountain Home | 1973 | |
| "Old Enough to Know Better (Too Young to Resist)" | Dolly Parton | Dolly Parton; Bill Owens | "Happy, Happy Birthday Baby" B-side | 1965 | |
| "Old Flames Can't Hold a Candle to You" | Dolly Parton | Pebe Sebert; Hugh Moffatt | Dolly, Dolly, Dolly | 1980 | |
| "Old Flames Can't Hold a Candle to You" | Kesha featuring Dolly Parton | Pebe Sebert; Hugh Moffatt | Rainbow | 2017 | |
| "Old Time Religion" | Dolly Parton | Traditional | Precious Memories | 1999 | |
| "Olive Branch" | Dolly Parton | Dolly Parton | Blue Smoke | 2014 | |
| "On and On" | Porter Wagoner and Dolly Parton | Eddie Sovine | The Right Combination • Burning the Midnight Oil | 1972 | |
| "On My Mind Again" | Dolly Parton | Porter Wagoner | The Bargain Store | 1975 | |
| "On the Road Again" | Dolly Parton, Ray Benson and Willie Nelson | Willie Nelson | Wild Texas Wind | 1991 | |
| "Once in a Very Blue Moon" | Dolly Parton | Pat Alger; Gene Levine | Real Love | 1985 | |
| "Once More" | Porter Wagoner and Dolly Parton | Dusty Owens | Once More | 1970 | |
| "Once Upon a Christmas" | Kenny Rogers and Dolly Parton | Dolly Parton | Once Upon a Christmas | 1984 | |
| "Once Upon a Christmas" | Selah featuring Dolly Parton | Dolly Parton | Rose of Bethlehem | 2002 | |
| "Once Upon a Memory" | Dolly Parton | Dolly Parton | Love Is Like a Butterfly | 1974 | |
| "One Angel" | Rory Feek featuring Dolly Parton | Sandy Emory Lawrence | Gentle Man | 2021 | |
| "One by One" | Porter Wagoner and Dolly Parton | Johnnie Wright; Jack Anglin; Jim Anglin | Just Between You and Me: The Complete Recordings, 1967–1976 | 2014 | |
| "One Day at a Time" | Porter Wagoner and Dolly Parton | Joe Babcock | Once More | 1970 | |
| "One Emotion After Another" | Dolly Parton | Dolly Parton | Rhinestone | 1984 | |
| "One of Those Days" | Dolly Parton | Dolly Parton | Burlap & Satin | 1983 | |
| "Only Dreamin'" | Dolly Parton | Dolly Parton | Backwoods Barbie | 2008 | |
| "Only Dreamin'" | Dolly Parton | Dolly Parton | Live from London | 2009 | |
| "Only Me and My Hairdresser Knows" | Dolly Parton | Arthur Thomas | Wanted | 2010 | |
| "Only My Pillow Knows" | Kathie Lee with Dolly Parton | Kathie Lee Gifford; David Friedman | Born for You | 2000 | |
| "Only the Memory Remains" | Dolly Parton | Dolly Parton | Dolly | 1975 | |
| "Ooo-eee" | Dolly Parton | Annie McLoone | Burlap & Satin | 1983 | |
| "Orange Blossom Special" | Dolly Parton | Ervin Rouse | Live and Well | 2004 | |
| "Our Love" | Porter Wagoner and Dolly Parton | Al Gore; Frank Dycus | Say Forever You'll Be Mine | 1975 | |
| "Outside Your Door" | Dolly Parton | Dolly Parton | Pure & Simple | 2016 | |
| "Packin' It Up" | Dolly Parton | Sandy Farina; Lisa Ratner | Dolly, Dolly, Dolly | 1980 | |
| "Palms of Victory" | Dolly Parton, Emmylou Harris and Linda Ronstadt | Traditional | Songbird: Rare Tracks and Forgotten Gems | 2007 | |
| "Paradise Road" | Dolly Parton | Dolly Parton | Hungry Again | 1998 | |
| "Peace Train" | Dolly Parton | Cat Stevens | Treasures | 1996 | |
| "Peace Train" | Dolly Parton | Cat Stevens | Peace Train (Note: When "Peace Train" was released as a single in July 1997, a maxi-single was released featuring five remixes; "Holy Roller Mix Extended", "Junior's Arena Anthem", "Julian's Morning Passage Mix", "Paul's TGV Mix", and "Holy Roller Mix Radio Edit".) | 1997 | |
| "Peace Train" | Dolly Parton | Cat Stevens | Walking on Sunshine (Note: When "Walking on Sunshine" was released as a single in August 1999, a maxi-single was released which featured one remix of "Peace Train"; "Bounce Euro Mix".) | 1999 | |
| "Peace Train" | Dolly Parton | Cat Stevens | Peace Train (Remixes) (Note: In June 2020, a new remix EP for "Peace Train" was released featuring 6 previously unreleased remixes; Junior's Tribal Beats, Junior's 7", Junior's Instrumental, Junior's Riff Dub, Junior's Arena Dub, and Junior's Arena Anthem Without Reprise.) | 2020 | |
| "Ping Pong" | Dolly Parton | Boudleaux Bryant | "I'm Not Worth the Tears" B-side | 1968 | |
| "Ping Pong" | Kris Kristofferson and Dolly Parton | Boudleaux Bryant | The Winning Hand (Note: Overdubbed version of Parton's 1967 recording featuring new duet vocals by Kris Kristofferson recorded in 1981.) | 1982 | |
| "Pink" | Dolly Parton, Monica, Jordin Sparks, Rita Wilson, and Sara Evans | Erin Kinsey; Jodi Marr; Victoria Shaw | Non-album single | 2020 | |
| "Pleasant as May" | Dolly Parton | Dolly Parton | Bubbling Over | 1973 | |
| "Pleasant as May" | Dolly Parton, Emmylou Harris and Linda Ronstadt | Dolly Parton | The Complete Trio Collection | 2016 | |
| "Please" | Rhonda Vincent and Dolly Parton | Elton John; Bernie Taupin | Restoration: Reimagining the Songs of Elton John and Bernie Taupin | 2018 | |
| "Please Don't Stop Loving Me" | Porter Wagoner and Dolly Parton | Dolly Parton; Porter Wagoner | Porter 'n' Dolly | 1974 | |
| "Please Help Me I'm Falling (In Love with You)" | Dolly Parton, Loretta Lynn and Tammy Wynette | Don Robertson; Hal Blair | Honky Tonk Angels | 1993 | |
| "Please Please Please" | Sabrina Carpenter featuring Dolly Parton | Sabrina Carpenter; Jack Antonoff; Amy Allen | Short n' Sweet (Deluxe) | 2025 | |
| "PMS Blues" | Dolly Parton | Dolly Parton | Heartsongs: Live from Home | 1994 | |
| "Poor Folks Town" | Porter Wagoner and Dolly Parton | Dolly Parton | Together Always | 1972 | |
| "Poor Folks Town" | Dolly Parton | Dolly Parton | 9 to 5 and Odd Jobs | 1980 | |
| "Possum Holler" | Porter Wagoner and Dolly Parton | Dallas Frazier | Two of a Kind | 1971 | |
| "Potential New Boyfriend" | Dolly Parton | Steve Kipner; John Lewis Parker | Burlap & Satin | 1983 | |
| "Power in the Blood" | Dolly Parton | Lewis E. Jones | Precious Memories | 1999 | |
| "Preacher Tom" | Dolly Parton | Dolly Parton | All I Can Do | 1976 | |
| "Precious Memories" | Dolly Parton | J.B.F. Wright | Precious Memories | 1999 | |
| "Pretty Flowers" | Steve Martin with Vince Gill and Dolly Parton | Steve Martin | The Crow: New Songs for the 5-String Banjo | 2009 | |
| "Pretty Is as Pretty Does" | Dolly Parton | Dolly Parton | A Smoky Mountain Christmas | 1986 | |
| "Pretty Paper" | Dolly Parton and Willie Nelson | Willie Nelson | A Holly Dolly Christmas | 2020 | |
| "Prime of Our Love" | Dolly Parton | Dolly Parton | Heartbreak Express | 1982 | |
| "Puppy Love" | Dolly Parton | Bill Owens | Single A-side | 1959 | |
| "Pure and Simple" | Dolly Parton | Dolly Parton | Pure & Simple | 2016 | |
| "Push and Pull" | Dolly Parton with Jennifer Aniston and Danielle Macdonald | Dolly Parton; Linda Perry | Dumplin' | 2018 | |
| "Put a Little Love in Your Heart" | Dolly Parton with the Christ Church Choir | Jackie DeShannon; Jimmy Holliday; Randy Myers | Slow Dancing with the Moon | 1993 | |
| "Put It Off Until Tomorrow" | Bill Phillips with Dolly Parton | Dolly Parton; Bill Owens | Put It Off Until Tomorrow | 1966 | |
| "Put It Off Until Tomorrow" | Dolly Parton | Dolly Parton; Bill Owens | Hello, I'm Dolly | 1967 | |
| "Put It Off Until Tomorrow" | Porter Wagoner and Dolly Parton | Dolly Parton; Bill Owens | Just Between You and Me | 1968 | |
| "Put It Off Until Tomorrow" | Dolly Parton | Dolly Parton; Bill Owens | A Real Live Dolly | 1970 | |
| "Put It Off Until Tomorrow" | Kris Kristofferson and Dolly Parton | Dolly Parton; Bill Owens | The Winning Hand (Note: Overdubbed version of Parton's 1966 recording originally released on her 1967 album, Hello, I'm Dolly, featuring new duet vocals by Kris Kristofferson recorded in 1981.) | 1982 | |
| "Put It Off Until Tomorrow" | Dolly Parton, Loretta Lynn and Tammy Wynette | Dolly Parton; Bill Owens | Honky Tonk Angels | 1993 | |
| "Ragged Angel" | Porter Wagoner and Dolly Parton | Dolly Parton | Once More | 1970 | |
| "Rainbowland" | Miley Cyrus featuring Dolly Parton | Miley Cyrus; Oren Yoel; Dolly Parton | Younger Now | 2017 | |
| "Randy" | Dolly Parton | Dolly Parton | Jolene | 1974 | |
| "Raven Dove" | Dolly Parton | Dolly Parton | Halos & Horns | 2002 | |
| "Real Love" | Dolly Parton duet with Kenny Rogers | David Malloy; Richard "Spady" Brannon; Randy McCormick | Real Love | 1985 | |
| "Real Love" | Dolly Parton | David Malloy; Richard "Spady" Brannon; Randy McCormick | I Will Always Love You: The Essential Dolly Parton One (Note: Solo version of the 1985 recording.) | 1995 | |
| "Red Hot Screaming Love" | Dolly Parton | Mike Chapman | Rainbow | 1987 | |
| "Red Shoes" | Dolly Parton | Dolly Parton; Linda Perry | Dumplin' | 2018 | |
| "Red, White and Bluegrass" | Dolly Parton | Dolly Parton | For God and Country | 2003 | |
| "Release Me" | Dolly Parton | Eddie Miller; Dub Williams; Robert Yount | Hits Made Famous by Country Queens | 1963 | |
| "Release Me" | Dolly Parton | Eddie Miller; Dub Williams; Robert Yount | Heartbreak Express | 1982 | |
| "Responsibility" | Dolly Parton | Dolly Parton | I Believe in You | 2017 | |
| "River of Happiness" | Dolly Parton | Dolly Parton | Jolene | 1974 | |
| "River of Happiness" | Dolly Parton | Dolly Parton | I'll Fly Away: Country Hymns & Songs of Faith | 2007 | |
| "Road Happy" | Dolly Parton and Ray Benson | Dolly Parton | Wild Texas Wind | 1991 | |
| "Road to Bethlehem" | Dailey & Vincent featuring Dolly Parton | Jeff Bates; Jimmy Fortune | The Sounds of Christmas | 2018 | |
| "Robert" | Dolly Parton | Dolly Parton | The Fairest of Them All | 1970 | |
| "Rockin' Years" | Dolly Parton duet with Ricky Van Shelton | Floyd Parton | Eagle When She Flies | 1991 | |
| "Rockin' Years" | George Jones with Dolly Parton | Floyd Parton | Burn Your Playhouse Down: The Unreleased Duets | 2008 | |
| "Rocky Top" | Dolly Parton | Felice Bryant; Boudleaux Bryant | Live and Well | 2004 | |
| "Rocky Top" | Dolly Parton | Felice Bryant; Boudleaux Bryant | Live from Glastonbury 2014 | 2016 | |
| "Rollin' in My Sweet Baby's Arms" | Dolly Parton and Ronnie Milsap | Traditional | In Concert with Host Charley Pride | 1975 | |
| "Romeo" | Dolly Parton with Billy Ray Cyrus, Tanya Tucker, Mary-Chapin Carpenter, Kathy Mattea and Pam Tillis | Dolly Parton | Slow Dancing with the Moon | 1993 | |
| "Rose of My Heart" | Dolly Parton | Dolly Parton | Backwoods Barbie: Collector's Edition | 2009 | |
| "Rosewood Casket" (Note: See also: "Little Rosewood Casket".) | Dolly Parton, Emmylou Harris and Linda Ronstadt | Traditional arr. by Avie Lee Parton | Trio | 1987 | |
| "Rudolph the Red-Nosed Reindeer" | Dolly Parton | Johnny Marks | Home for Christmas | 1990 | |
| "Run" | Dolly Parton | Dolly Parton | Run, Rose, Run | 2022 | |
| "Run That by Me One More Time" | Porter Wagoner and Dolly Parton | Dolly Parton | Porter Wayne and Dolly Rebecca | 1970 | |
| "Run That by Me One More Time" | Porter Wagoner and Dolly Parton | Dolly Parton | A Real Live Dolly | 1970 | |
| "Runaway Feelin'" | Dolly Parton | Dolly Parton | Eagle When She Flies | 1991 | |
| "Runaway Feelin'" | Dolly Parton | Dolly Parton | Heartsong | 1994 | |
| "Runaway Feelin'" | Dolly Parton and Billy Dean | Dolly Parton | Blue Valley Songbird | 1999 | |
| "Sacred Memories" | Dolly Parton | Dolly Parton | Love Is Like a Butterfly | 1974 | |
| "Same Old Fool" | Dolly Parton | Glenn Sutton; Greg Leroy; Jim Helmer | Dolly, Dolly, Dolly | 1980 | |
| "Sandy's Song" | Dolly Parton | Dolly Parton | Great Balls of Fire | 1979 | |
| "Santa Claus Is Coming to Town" | Dolly Parton | John Frederick Coots; Haven Gillespie | Home for Christmas | 1990 | |
| "Satan's River" | Porter Wagoner and Dolly Parton | Porter Wagoner | We Found It | 1973 | |
| "Satin Sheets" | Dolly Parton | John E. Volinkaty | Treasures | 1996 | |
| "Satisfied" | Vestal Goodman duet with Dolly Parton | Martha Carson | Vestal & Friends | 1999 | |
| "Save the Last Dance for Me" | Dolly Parton | Doc Pomus; Mort Shuman | Single A-side (Note: When the song was released as a single in December 1983, a special 12" single was released. The A-side was a "Long Version" of the song, backed with the "Instrumental" and "Short/Album Version".) | 1983 | |
| "Save the Last Dance for Me" | Dolly Parton | Doc Pomus; Mort Shuman | The Great Pretender | 1984 | |
| "Savin' It for You" | Dolly Parton | Dino Fekaris; David Loeb | Rainbow | 1987 | |
| "Say It's True" | Dolly Parton | | Wild Texas Wind | 1991 | |
| "Say Forever You'll Be Mine" | Porter Wagoner and Dolly Parton | Dolly Parton | Say Forever You'll Be Mine | 1975 | |
| "Say Forever You'll Be Mine" | Dolly Parton | Dolly Parton | Pure & Simple (Note: This recording was featured in the 2015 TV movie Dolly Parton's Coat of Many Colors prior to being included on Parton's 2016 album Pure & Simple.) | 2016 | |
| "Say Goodnight" | Dolly Parton | Gary Portnoy; Susan Sheridan | Dolly, Dolly, Dolly | 1980 | |
| "Second Best" | Dolly Parton | Dolly Parton | Touch Your Woman | 1972 | |
| "Secrets" | Dolly Parton | Dolly Parton | Run, Rose, Run | 2022 | |
| "Send Me No Roses" | Dolly Parton | Harry Mills | Wanted | 2010 | |
| "Sent from Above" | Dolly Parton | Dolly parton | Non-album single | 2021 | |
| "Send Me the Pillow That You Dream On" | Dolly Parton | Hank Locklin | Burlap & Satin | 1983 | |
| "Send Me the Pillow That You Dream On" | Hank Locklin featuring Dolly Parton | Hank Locklin | Generations in Song | 2001 | |
| "Seven Bridges Road" | Dolly Parton | Steve Young | Little Sparrow | 2001 | |
| "Sha-Kon-O-Hey!" | Dolly Parton | Dolly Parton | Sha-Kon-O-Hey! Land of Blue Smoke | 2009 | |
| "Shattered Image" | Dolly Parton | Dolly Parton | All I Can Do | 1976 | |
| "Shattered Image" | Dolly Parton | Dolly Parton | Halos & Horns | 2002 | |
| "Shattered Image" | Dolly Parton | Dolly Parton | An Evening with Dolly | 2012 | |
| "She Don't Love You (Like I Love You)" | Dolly Parton | Jerry Butler; Calvin Carter; Curtis Mayfield | The Great Pretender | 1984 | |
| "She Don't Love You (Like I Love You)" | Dolly Parton | Jerry Butler; Calvin Carter; Curtis Mayfield | Think About Love | 1986 | |
| "She Never Met a Man (She Didn't Like)" | Dolly Parton | Dolly Parton | Coat of Many Colors | 1971 | |
| "Shine" | Dolly Parton | Ed Roland | Little Sparrow | 2001 | |
| "Shine" | Dolly Parton | Ed Roland | Live and Well | 2004 | |
| "Shine" | Dolly Parton | Ed Roland | Love Always: Live from Texas | 2009 | |
| "Shine Like the Sun" | Dolly Parton | Dolly Parton | Better Day | 2011 | |
| "Shine On" | Dolly Parton | Dolly Parton | Hungry Again | 1998 | |
| "Shinola" | Dolly Parton | Dolly Parton | Backwoods Barbie | 2008 | |
| "Shinola" | Dolly Parton | Dolly Parton | Live from London | 2009 | |
| "Silent Night" | Dolly Parton | Franz Xaver Gruber; Joseph Mohr | Home for Christmas: The Radio Special | 1990 | |
| "Silent Night" | Dolly Parton | Franz Xaver Gruber; Joseph Mohr | Annabelle's Wish | 1997 | |
| "Silent Night" | Billy Dean duet with Dolly Parton | Franz Xaver Gruber; Joseph Mohr | The Christ (A Song for Joseph) | 2005 | |
| "Silver and Gold" | Dolly Parton | Carl Perkins; Stan Perkins; Gregg Perkins | Eagle When She Flies | 1991 | |
| "Silver Dagger" | Dolly Parton | Traditional arr. by Dolly Parton | The Grass Is Blue | 1999 | |
| "Silver Sandals" | Porter Wagoner and Dolly Parton | Dolly Parton | Porter Wayne and Dolly Rebecca | 1970 | |
| "Silver Threads and Golden Needles" | Dolly Parton, Loretta Lynn and Tammy Wynette | Jack Rhodes; Dick Reynolds | Honky Tonk Angels | 1993 | |
| "Sing for the Common Man" | Dolly Parton | Frieda Parton; Mark Anderson | 9 to 5 and Odd Jobs | 1980 | |
| "Singing on the Mountain" | Porter Wagoner and Dolly Parton | Porter Wagoner | Porter & Dolly | 1980 | |
| "Singing on the Mountain" | Porter Wagoner and Dolly Parton | Porter Wagoner | Just Between You and Me: The Complete Recordings, 1967–1976 | 2014 | |
| "Single Women" | Dolly Parton | Michael O'Donoghue | Heartbreak Express | 1982 | |
| "Sisters" | Stella Parton duet with Dolly Parton | Stella Parton | Always Tomorrow | 1989 | |
| "Sittin' on the Front Porch Swing" | Dolly Parton, Loretta Lynn and Tammy Wynette | Buddy Sheffield | Honky Tonk Angels | 1993 | |
| "Sixteen Years" | Porter Wagoner and Dolly Parton | Porter Wagoner; Tom Pick | Porter 'n' Dolly | 1974 | |
| "Sleepless Nights" | The Nobles with Dolly Parton | | Slow Glowin' Dream | 1998 | |
| "Sleigh Ride" | Dolly Parton | Mitchell Parish; Leroy Anderson | Once Upon a Christmas | 1984 | |
| "Slip Away Today" | Porter Wagoner and Dolly Parton | Curly Putman | Just the Two of Us | 1968 | |
| "Slippin' Around" | Floyd Tillman with Dolly Parton | Floyd Tilman | The Influence | 2004 | |
| "Slow Dancing with the Moon" | Dolly Parton | Mac Davis | Slow Dancing with the Moon | 1993 | |
| "Slow Healing Heart" | Dolly Parton | Jim Rushing | White Limozeen | 1989 | |
| "Slowly I'm Falling to Pieces" | Paul Brewster with Dolly Parton | Paul Brewster | Everybody's Talkin' | 2003 | |
| "Smoky Mountain Memories" (Note: See also: "Appalachian Memories".) | Dolly Parton | Dolly Parton | Heartsongs: Live from Home | 1994 | |
| "Smoky Mountain Memories" | Bryan Sutton featuring Dolly Parton | Dolly Parton | Ready to Go | 2000 | |
| "Smoky Mountain Memories" | Dolly Parton | Dolly Parton | Live and Well | 2004 | |
| "Smoky Mountain Rain" | Ronnie Milsap featuring Dolly Parton | Dennis Morgan; Kye Fleming | The Duets | 2019 | |
| "Snakes in the Grass" | Dolly Parton | Dolly Parton | Run, Rose, Run | 2022 | |
| "Sneakin' Around" | Dolly Parton and Burt Reynolds | Dolly Parton | The Best Little Whorehouse in Texas | 1982 | |
| "So Little I Wanted, So Little I Got" | Bill Owens and Dolly Parton | Bill Owens; Dolly Parton | Single A-side | 1960 | |
| "Softly and Tenderly" | Dolly Parton | Will L. Thompson | Precious Memories | 1999 | |
| "Softly and Tenderly" | Dolly Parton, Emmylou Harris and Linda Ronstadt | Will L. Thompson | Songbird: Rare Tracks and Forgotten Gems | 2007 | |
| "Somebody's Everything" | Dolly Parton | Dolly Parton | Backwoods Barbie | 2008 | |
| "Somebody's Missing You" | Dolly Parton | Dolly Parton | First Dog | 2010 | |
| "Somebody's Missing You" | Dolly Parton | Dolly Parton | Better Day | 2011 | |
| "Someone Just Like You" | Porter Wagoner and Dolly Parton | Joe Hudgins | Porter & Dolly | 1980 | |
| "Someone Just Like You" | Porter Wagoner and Dolly Parton | Joe Hudgins | Just Between You and Me: The Complete Recordings, 1967–1976 | 2014 | |
| "Something Bigger Than Me" | Dolly Parton | Steve Dorff; Marty Panzer | Annabelle's Wish | 1997 | |
| "Something Fishy" | Dolly Parton | Dolly Parton | Hello, I'm Dolly | 1967 | |
| "Something Fishy" | Dolly Parton | Dolly Parton | A Real Live Dolly | 1970 | |
| "Something More" | Dolly Parton | Dolly Parton | 1927 Jubilee: The New Bristol Sessions | 2018 | |
| "Something Special" | Dolly Parton | Dolly Parton | Something Special | 1995 | |
| "Something to Reach For" | Porter Wagoner and Dolly Parton | Dolly Parton | Say Forever You'll Be Mine | 1975 | |
| "Something's Burning" | Dolly Parton | Mac Davis | Treasures | 1996 | |
| "Sometimes an Old Memory Gets in My Eye" | Dolly Parton | Bill Owens | Bubbling Over | 1973 | |
| "Somewhere Along the Way" | Porter Wagoner and Dolly Parton | Dolly Parton | The Right Combination • Burning the Midnight Oil | 1972 | |
| "Somewhere Between" | Porter Wagoner and Dolly Parton | Merle Haggard | Just the Two of Us | 1968 | |
| "Sorrow's Tearing Down the House (That Happiness Once Built)" | Porter Wagoner and Dolly Parton | Mel Tillis; Kent Westberry | Just Between You and Me | 1968 | |
| "Sounds of Nature" | Porter Wagoner and Dolly Parton | Dolly Parton; Porter Wagoner | Porter 'n' Dolly | 1974 | |
| "Sounds of Night" | Porter Wagoner and Dolly Parton | Porter Wagoner | Love and Music | 1973 | |
| "Speakin' of the Devil" | Dolly Parton | Dolly Parton | Wild Texas Wind | 1991 | |
| "Speakin' of the Devil" | Dolly Parton | Dolly Parton | Something Special | 1995 | |
| "Stairway to Heaven" | Dolly Parton | Jimmy Page; Robert Plant | Halos & Horns | 2002 | |
| "Stairway to Heaven" | Dolly Parton | Jimmy Page; Robert Plant | Live and Well | 2004 | |
| "Stand by the River" | Dottie Rambo duet with Dolly Parton | Dottie Rambo | Stand by the River | 2003 | |
| "Star of the Show" | Dolly Parton | Dolly Parton | Great Balls of Fire | 1979 | |
| "Starting Over Again" | Dolly Parton | Donna Summer; Bruce Sudano | Dolly, Dolly, Dolly | 1980 | |
| "Stay Out of My Bedroom" | Sylvester Stallone with Dolly Parton | Dolly Parton | Rhinestone | 1984 | |
| "Steady as the Rain" | Dolly Parton | Dolly Parton | The Grass Is Blue | 1999 | |
| "Steady as the Rain" | The Larkins with Dolly Parton | Dolly Parton | The Larkins | 2003 | |
| "Still on Your Mind" | Dolly Parton | Porter Wagoner | My Favorite Songwriter, Porter Wagoner | 1972 | |
| "Straight Talk" | Dolly Parton | Dolly Parton | Straight Talk | 1992 | |
| "Sugar Hill" | Dolly Parton | Dolly Parton | Halos & Horns | 2002 | |
| "Sure Thing" | Dolly Parton | Dolly Parton | Heartbreaker | 1978 | |
| "Sweet Agony" | Dolly Parton | David Wolfert; Susan Sheridan | Dolly, Dolly, Dolly | 1980 | |
| "Sweet Lovin' Friends" | Dolly Parton and Sylvester Stallone | Dolly Parton | Rhinestone | 1984 | |
| "Sweet Music Man" | Dolly Parton | Kenny Rogers | Here You Come Again | 1977 | |
| "Sweet Rachel Ann" | Porter Wagoner and Dolly Parton | Dolly Parton | We Found It | 1973 | |
| "Sweet Summer Lovin'" | Dolly Parton | Blaise Totsi | Great Balls of Fire | 1979 | |
| "Swingin' Like Tarzan and Jane" | Dolly Parton | | Wild Texas Wind | 1991 | |
| "Take Away" | Porter Wagoner and Dolly Parton | Porter Wagoner | Together Always | 1972 | |
| "Take Me Back" | Dolly Parton | Dolly Parton | Love Is Like a Butterfly | 1974 | |
| "Take Me Back to the Country" | Dolly Parton | Karen Staley | White Limozeen | 1989 | |
| "Tall Man" | Dolly Parton | Billy Strange; Juan Esquivel | A Real Live Dolly | 1970 | |
| "Tall Man" | Dolly Parton | Billy Strange; Juan Esquivel | Wild Texas Wind | 1991 | |
| "Tangled Vines" | Porter Wagoner and Dolly Parton | Damon Black | Playlist: The Very Best of Porter Wagoner & Dolly Parton | 2012 | |
| "Teach Me to Trust" | Dolly Parton | Dolly Parton; Gene Golden | Something Special | 1995 | |
| "Tell Me That You Love Me" | Kenny Rogers and Dolly Parton | Buffy Lawson; Eric Pittarelli; Todd Cerney | The First 50 Years | 2009 | |
| "Telling Me Lies" | Dolly Parton, Emmylou Harris and Linda Ronstadt | Linda Thompson; Betsy Cook | Trio | 1987 | |
| "Ten Four–Over and Out" | Porter Wagoner and Dolly Parton | Porter Wagoner | Together Always | 1972 | |
| "Tennessee Homesick Blues" | Dolly Parton | Dolly Parton | Rhinestone | 1984 | |
| "Tennessee Homesick Blues" | Dolly Parton | Dolly Parton | Single A-side (Note: The single edit removes the applause from the beginning and ending of the song.) | 1984 | |
| "Thank God I'm a Country Boy" | Roy Rivers and Dolly Parton | John Sommers | Thank God I'm a Country Boy | 2004 | |
| "That's the Way It Could Have Been" | Dolly Parton, Loretta Lynn and Tammy Wynette | Tammy Wynette | Honky Tonk Angels | 1993 | |
| "That's When Love Will Mean the Most" | Porter Wagoner and Dolly Parton | Porter Wagoner | We Found It | 1973 | |
| "The Angels Rejoiced" | Dolly Parton and Sonya Isaacs | Ira Louvin; Charlie Louvin | Livin', Lovin', Losin': Songs of the Louvin Brothers | 2003 | |
| "The Bargain Store" | Dolly Parton | Dolly Parton | The Bargain Store | 1975 | |
| "The Bargain Store" | Dolly Parton | Dolly Parton | In Concert with Host Charley Pride | 1975 | |
| "The Beautiful Lie" | Dolly Parton | David "Butch" McDade | Little Sparrow | 2001 | |
| "The Beginning" | Dolly Parton | Dolly Parton | Bubbling Over | 1973 | |
| "The Beginning" | Dolly Parton | Dolly Parton | Say Forever You'll Be Mine | 1975 | |
| "The Better Part of Life" | Dolly Parton | Dolly Parton | My Tennessee Mountain Home | 1973 | |
| "The Bird That Never Flew" | Dolly Parton | Porter Wagoner | My Favorite Songwriter, Porter Wagoner | 1972 | |
| "The Blue Train" | Dolly Parton, Emmylou Harris and Dolly Parton | Jennifer Kimball; Tom Kimmel | Trio II | 1999 | |
| "The Blues Ain't Workin' on Me" | Rhonda Vincent with Dolly Parton | Tom Shapiro; George Teren | Trouble Free | 1996 | |
| "The Blues Man" | George Jones featuring Dolly Parton | Hank Williams Jr. | Hits I Missed...And One I Didn't | 2005 | |
| "The Bridge" | Dolly Parton | Dolly Parton | Just Because I'm a Woman | 1968 | |
| "The Bright Blue Rose" | Maura O'Connell with Dolly Parton | Jimmy MacCarthy | Naked with Friends | 2009 | |
| "The Camel's Heart" | Dolly Parton | Dolly Parton | Hungry Again | 1998 | |
| "The Carroll County Accident" | Dolly Parton | Bob Ferguson | In the Good Old Days (When Times Were Bad) | 1969 | |
| "The Carroll County Accident" | Buck Trent featuring Dolly Parton | Bob Ferguson | Spartanburg Blues | 2018 | |
| "The Company You Keep" | Dolly Parton | Dolly Parton; Bill Owens | Hello, I'm Dolly | 1967 | |
| "The Cruel War" | Dolly Parton with special guests Alison Krauss, Mindy Smith, and Dan Tyminski | Traditional arr. by Dolly Parton | Those Were the Days | 2005 | |
| "The Dark End of the Street" | Porter Wagoner and Dolly Parton | Dan Penn; Chips Moman | Just the Two of Us | 1968 | |
| "The Day I Fall in Love" | Dolly Parton and James Ingram | Carole Bayer Sager; James Ingram; Cliff Magness | Beethoven's 2nd | 1993 | |
| "The Fall" | Dolly Parton | Dolly Parton | Single A-side | 2021 | |
| "The Fighting Kind" | Porter Wagoner and Dolly Parton | Dolly Parton | Two of a Kind | 1971 | |
| "The Fire That Keeps You Warm" | Porter Wagoner and Dolly Parton | Dolly Parton | Porter 'n' Dolly | 1974 | |
| "The Fire That Keeps You Warm" | Dolly Parton | Dolly Parton | All I Can Do | 1976 | |
| "The Fire's Still Burning" | Dolly Parton | Dolly Parton; Dorothy Jo Hope | Joshua | 1971 | |
| "The Flame" | Porter Wagoner and Dolly Parton | Dolly Parton | Two of a Kind | 1971 | |
| "The Fog Has Lifted" | Porter Wagoner and Dolly Parton | Dave Kirby; Don Stock | The Right Combination • Burning the Midnight Oil | 1972 | |
| "The Giving and the Taking" | Dolly Parton | Dolly Parton; Bill Owens | Hello, I'm Dolly | 1967 | |
| "The Glory Forever" | Dolly Parton | Dolly Parton | For God and Country | 2003 | |
| "The Golden Streets of Glory" | Dolly Parton | Dolly Parton | The Golden Streets of Glory | 1971 | |
| "The Golden Streets of Glory" | Dolly Parton | Dolly Parton | Just Between You and Me: The Complete Recordings, 1967–1976 | 2014 | |
| "The Grass Is Blue" | Dolly Parton | Dolly Parton | The Grass Is Blue | 1999 | |
| "The Grass Is Blue" | Dolly Parton | Dolly Parton | Live and Well | 2004 | |
| "The Grass Is Blue" | Dolly Parton | Dolly Parton | Singer, Songwriter & Legendary Performer (Note: This live recording would later be included as a bonus track on the iTunes pre-order edition of Parton's 2008 album, Backwoods Barbie.) | 2007 | |
| "The Grass Is Blue" | Dolly Parton | Dolly Parton | Live from London | 2009 | |
| "The Great Pretender" | Dolly Parton | Buck Ram | The Great Pretender | 1984 | |
| "The Greatest Days of All" | Dolly Parton | Dolly Parton | Touch Your Woman | 1972 | |
| "The Greatest Gift of All" | Kenny Rogers and Dolly Parton | John Jarvis | Once Upon a Christmas | 1984 | |
| "The House of the Rising Sun" | Dolly Parton | Traditional arr. by Dolly Parton and Mike Post | 9 to 5 and Odd Jobs | 1980 | |
| "The House Where Love Lives" | Porter Wagoner and Dolly Parton | Leona Reese | Always, Always | 1969 | |
| "The Last One to Touch Me" | Dolly Parton | Dolly Parton | Joshua | 1971 | |
| "The Last Thing on My Mind" | Porter Wagoner and Dolly Parton | Tom Paxton | Just Between You and Me | 1968 | |
| "The Last Thing on My Mind" | Porter Wagoner and Dolly Parton | Tom Paxton | Rare Country Legends Live | 2009 | |
| "The Last Word in Lonesome Is Me" | Dolly Parton featuring Alison Krauss | Roger Miller | King of the Road: A Tribute to Roger Miller | 2018 | |
| "The Little Drummer Boy" | Dolly Parton | K.K. Davis; Henry Onorati; Harry Simeone | Home for Christmas | 1990 | |
| "The Little Things" | Dolly Parton | Dolly Parton; Bill Owens | Hello, I'm Dolly | 1967 | |
| "The Little Things" | Dolly Parton | Dolly Parton; Bill Owens | The Winning Hand (Note: Overdubbed and slowed down version of Parton's 1966 recording originally released on her 1967 album, Hello, I'm Dolly.) | 1982 | |
| "The Lonesomes" | Dolly Parton | Dolly Parton | Backwoods Barbie | 2008 | |
| "The Lord Is My Shepherd" | Dolly Parton | Traditional | For God and Country | 2003 | |
| "The Love I Used to Call Mine" | Dolly Parton | Dolly Parton | Dolly | 1975 | |
| "The Love You Gave" | Dolly Parton with the Merry Melody Singers | Robert Riley; Marie Jones | "It's Sure Gonna Hurt" B-side | 1962 | |
| "The Magic of Being Together" | Dolly Parton | Dolly Parton | Dolly Parton's Christmas of Many Colors: Circle of Love | 2016 | |
| "The Man" | Dolly Parton | Dolly Parton | Heartbreaker | 1978 | |
| "The Master's Hand" | Dolly Parton | Dolly Parton | The Golden Streets of Glory | 1971 | |
| "The Monkey's Tale" | Dolly Parton | Leona Ross | My Blue Ridge Mountain Boy | 1969 | |
| "The Moon, the Stars and Me" | Dolly Parton | Wayland Patton; Diana Rae | White Limozeen | 1989 | |
| "The Mystery of the Mystery" | Dolly Parton | Porter Wagoner | Coat of Many Colors | 1971 | |
| "The Only Hand You'll Need to Hold" | Dolly Parton | Dolly Parton | The Bargain Store | 1975 | |
| "The Only Way Out (Is to Walk Over Me)" | Dolly Parton | Neal Merritt | Just Because I'm a Woman | 1968 | |
| "The Pain of Loving You" | Porter Wagoner and Dolly Parton | Porter Wagoner; Dolly Parton | Two of a Kind | 1971 | |
| "The Pain of Loving You" | Dolly Parton, Emmylou Harris and Linda Ronstadt | Porter Wagoner; Dolly Parton | Trio | 1987 | |
| "The Pain of Loving You" | The Grascals with Dolly Parton | Porter Wagoner; Dolly Parton | Country Classics with a Bluegrass Spin | 2011 | |
| "The Party" | Porter Wagoner and Dolly Parton | Dolly Parton | Just the Two of Us | 1968 | |
| "The Power of Love" | Porter Wagoner and Dolly Parton | Porter Wagoner | Porter 'n' Dolly | 1974 | |
| "The Pretty Young Girl" | Altan featuring Dolly Parton | Traditional | The Blue Idol | 2002 | |
| "The Right Combination" | Porter Wagoner and Dolly Parton | Porter Wagoner | The Right Combination • Burning the Midnight Oil | 1972 | |
| "The Right Time" | Brother Clyde featuring Dolly Parton | Billy Ray Cyrus; Dolly Parton; Morris Joseph Tancredi | Brother Clyde | 2010 | |
| "The River Unbroken" | Dolly Parton | David Batteau; Darrell Brown | Rainbow | 1987 | |
| "The Sacrifice" | Dolly Parton | Dolly Parton | Better Day | 2011 | |
| "The Salt in My Tears" | Dolly Parton | Dolly Parton | Hungry Again | 1998 | |
| "The Seeker" | Dolly Parton | Dolly Parton | Dolly | 1975 | |
| "The Seeker" | Dolly Parton | Dolly Parton | Something Special | 1995 | |
| "The Seeker" | Dolly Parton | Dolly Parton | Live at the Bottom Line | 2015 | |
| "The Seeker" | Julie and Dan featuring Dolly Parton | Dolly Parton | Hymns: Some of Old, Some of New | 2022 | |
| "The Star-Spangled Banner" | Dolly Parton | Francis Scott Key | For God and Country | 2003 | |
| "The Story" | Dolly Parton | Tim Hanseroth | Cover Stories | 2017 | |
| "The Tender Touch of Love" | Dolly Parton | Porter Wagoner | Coat of Many Colors | 2007 | |
| "The Tracks of My Tears" | Dolly Parton | William Robinson; Marvin Tarplin; Warren Moore | Backwoods Barbie | 2008 | |
| "The Way I See You" | Dolly Parton | Porter Wagoner | Coat of Many Colors | 1971 | |
| "The Wish Book" | Dolly Parton | Dolly Parton | A Holly Dolly Christmas | 2020 | |
| "There" | Dolly Parton | Dolly Parton | New Harvest...First Gathering | 1977 | |
| "There Never Was a Time" | Porter Wagoner and Dolly Parton | Myra Smith; Margaret Lewis | Always, Always | 1969 | |
| "There Was Jesus" (Note: A piano version of "There Was Jesus" was released in 2021.) | Zach Williams and Dolly Parton | Zach Williams; Jonathan Smith; Casey Beathard | Rescue Story | 2019 | |
| "There Will Be Peace in the Valley" | Dolly Parton | Traditional | For God and Country | 2003 | |
| "There'll Always Be Music" | Porter Wagoner and Dolly Parton | Dolly Parton | Love and Music | 1973 | |
| "There'll Always Be Music" | Porter Wagoner and Dolly Parton | Dolly Parton | Just Between You and Me: The Complete Recordings, 1967–1976 | 2014 | |
| "There'll Be Love" | Porter Wagoner and Dolly Parton | Porter Wagoner; Dolly Parton | Two of a Kind | 1971 | |
| "There's a Ring Around the Moon Tonight" | Dolly Parton and Ray Benson | | Wild Texas Wind | 1991 | |
| "There's No Place Like Home" (Note: Instrumental) | Dolly Parton | | Live at the Bottom Line | 2015 | |
| "These Old Bones" | Dolly Parton | Dolly Parton | Halos & Horns | 2002 | |
| "These Old Bones" | Dolly Parton | Dolly Parton | Singer, Songwriter & Legendary Performer | 2007 | |
| "These Old Bones" | Dolly Parton | Dolly Parton | Dolly Parton's Heartstrings | 2019 | |
| "Think About Love" | Dolly Parton | Richard "Spady" Brannan; Tom Campbell | Real Love | 1985 | |
| "Think About Love" | Dolly Parton | Richard "Spady" Brannan; Tom Campbell | Think About Love (Note: Remixed by Joe Scaife and Mark Wright at Music Mill in Nashville, Tennessee. This is the single version which differs from the version on Parton's 1985 album, Real Love, with the addition of the lyric "Think about love" before the bridge, a shortened instrumental section, louder drum overdubs and an overall punchier mix.) | 1986 | |
| "This Boy Has Been Hurt" | Dolly Parton | Dolly Parton; Bill Owens | As Long as I Love | 1970 | |
| "This Old House" | Brenda Lee with Dolly Parton | Stuart Hamblen | Gospel Duets with Treasured Friends | 2007 | |
| "This Time Has Gotta Be Our Last Time" | Porter Wagoner and Dolly Parton | Bill Owens | Just Between You and Me | 1968 | |
| "Those Memories of You" | Dolly Parton, Emmylou Harris and Linda Ronstadt | Alan O'Bryant | Trio | 1987 | |
| "Those Were the Days" | Dolly Parton with special guests Mary Hopkin, Porter Wagoner & the Opry Gang, and the Moscow Circus | Gene Raskin | Those Were the Days | 2005 | |
| "Thought I Couldn't Dance" | Dolly Parton | Dolly Parton | Straight Talk | 1992 | |
| "Thoughtfulness" | Porter Wagoner and Dolly Parton | Bill Owens | Once More | 1970 | |
| "Three Candles" | Dolly Parton | Dolly Parton | A Holly Dolly Christmas | 2020 | |
| "Through Thick and Thin" | Porter Wagoner and Dolly Parton | Bill Owens | The Right Combination • Burning the Midnight Oil | 1972 | |
| "Tie a Yellow Ribbon" | Dolly Parton | Irwin Levine; Larry Russell Brown | For God and Country | 2003 | |
| "Tie Our Love (In a Double Knot)" | Dolly Parton | Jeff Silbar; John Reid | Real Love | 1985 | |
| "'Til Death Do Us Part" | Dolly Parton | Dolly Parton | My Blue Ridge Mountain Boy | 1969 | |
| "Time and Tears" | Dolly Parton | Dolly Parton | Hungry Again | 1998 | |
| "Time Flies" | Dolly Parton | Dolly Parton | Sha-Kon-O-Hey! Land of Blue Smoke | 2009 | |
| "Time for Me to Fly" | Dolly Parton | Kevin Cronin | White Limozeen | 1989 | |
| "To Daddy" | Dolly Parton | Dolly Parton | Heartsongs: Live from Home | 1994 | |
| "To Daddy" | Dolly Parton | Dolly Parton | Single A-side (Note: Single version is the same recording from Heartsongs: Live from Home with the audience edited out.) | 1994 | |
| "To Daddy" | Dolly Parton | Dolly Parton | I Will Always Love You: The Essential Dolly Parton One (Note: Recorded on February 18, 1976, during the sessions for All I Can Do.) | 1995 | |
| "To Daddy" | Tom Astor duet with Dolly Parton | Dolly Parton | Alles llar – kein problem! | 2008 | |
| "To Know Him Is to Love Him" | Dolly Parton, Emmylou Harris and Linda Ronstadt | Phil Spector | Trio | 1987 | |
| "Today I Started Loving You Again" | Dolly Parton | Merle Haggard; Bonnie Owens | Treasures | 1996 | |
| "Today, Tomorrow and Forever" | Porter Wagoner and Dolly Parton | Bill Owens | Two of a Kind | 1971 | |
| "Together Always" | Porter Wagoner and Dolly Parton | Dolly Parton | Together Always | 1972 | |
| "Together Forever" | Dolly Parton | Dolly Parton | I Believe in You | 2017 | |
| "Together You and I" | Porter Wagoner and Dolly Parton | Dolly Parton | Porter 'n' Dolly | 1974 | |
| "Together You and I" | Dolly Parton | Dolly Parton | Better Day | 2011 | |
| "Tomorrow Is Forever" | Porter Wagoner and Dolly Parton | Dolly Parton | Porter Wayne and Dolly Rebecca | 1970 | |
| "Tomorrow Is Forever" | Porter Wagoner and Dolly Parton | Dolly Parton | A Real Live Dolly | 1970 | |
| "Tomorrow Is Forever" | Solomon Burke with Dolly Parton | Dolly Parton | Nashville | 2006 | |
| "Tomorrow Is Forever" | Dolly Parton | Dolly Parton | Pure & Simple | 2016 | |
| "Tomorrow's Tears Today" | Billy Earl and the Kinfolks with Dolly Parton | | Dolly Parton Presents Billy Earl and the Kinfolks | | |
| "Too Far Gone" | Porter Wagoner and Dolly Parton | Dolly Parton | Porter 'n' Dolly | 1974 | |
| "Too Lonely Too Long" | Dolly Parton | Dolly Parton | As Long as I Love | 1970 | |
| "Touch of a Dove" | Brian Waldschalger with Dolly Parton | Brian Waldschalger | Down There | 2000 | |
| "Touch Your Woman" | Dolly Parton | Dolly Parton | Touch Your Woman | 1972 | |
| "Touch Your Woman" | Dolly Parton | Dolly Parton | Rare Country Legends Live | 2009 | |
| "Touching Memories" | Porter Wagoner and Dolly Parton | Porter Wagoner; Tom Pick | Porter & Dolly | 1980 | |
| "Touching Memories" | Porter Wagoner and Dolly Parton | Porter Wagoner; Tom Pick | Just Between You and Me: The Complete Recordings, 1967–1976 | 2014 | |
| "Train, Train" | Dolly Parton | Shorty Medlocke | The Grass Is Blue | 1999 | |
| "Train, Train" | Dolly Parton | Shorty Medlocke | Live and Well | 2004 | |
| "Train, Train" | Eric Lee Beddingfield with Dolly Parton | Shorty Medlocke | Eric Lee Beddingfield | 2007 | |
| "Train, Train" | Dolly Parton | Shorty Medlocke | Love Always: Live from Texas | 2009 | |
| "Travelin' Prayer" | Dolly Parton | Billy Joel | The Grass Is Blue | 1999 | |
| "Travelin' Thru" | Dolly Parton | Dolly Parton | Transamerica | 2006 | |
| "Traveling Man" | Dolly Parton | Dolly Parton | Coat of Many Colors | 1971 | |
| "Traveling Man" | Dolly Parton | Dolly Parton | Bubbling Over | 1973 | |
| "True Blue" | Dolly Parton | Dolly Parton; James Newton Howard | Heartsongs: Live from Home | 1994 | |
| "True Blue" | Isabelle Boulay duet with Dolly Parton | Dolly Parton; James Newton Howard | Les grands espaces | 2011 | |
| "Try" | Dolly Parton | Dolly Parton | Blue Smoke | 2014 | |
| "Try Being Lonely" | Dolly Parton | Charles Trent; George McCormick | Just Because I'm a Woman | 1968 | |
| "Turn, Turn, Turn (To Everything There Is a Season)" | Dolly Parton | Pete Seeger | The Great Pretender | 1984 | |
| "Turn, Turn, Turn (To Everything There Is a Season)" | Dolly Parton with special guest Roger McGuinn | Pete Seeger | Those Were the Days | 2005 | |
| "Twelfth of Never" | Dolly Parton with special guest Keith Urban | Lisa Lee Reagan; Emily Bree Stevenson | Those Were the Days | 2005 | |
| "Twelve Days of Christmas" | Rhonda Vincent featuring Dolly Parton, Willie Nelson, Charlie Daniels, the Oak Ridge Boys, Ronnie Milsap, Gene Watson, Bill Anderson, Larry Gatlin, Jeannie Seely, Lorrie Morgan, Pam Tillis, and EmiSunshine | Traditional | Christmas Time | 2015 | |
| "Twin Mounds of Clay" | Dolly Parton | Howard Lips | Just Between You and Me: The Complete Recordings, 1967–1976 | 2014 | |
| "Two" | Porter Wagoner and Dolly Parton | Dolly Parton | Porter 'n' Dolly | 1974 | |
| "Two Doors Down" | Dolly Parton | Dolly Parton | Here You Come Again | 1977 | |
| "Two Doors Down" | Dolly Parton | Dolly Parton | Single A-side (Note: Re-recorded single version which omits the first verse and includes an upbeat "sing-along" bridge. It replaced the original album version on all subsequent pressings of Here You Come Again.) | 1978 | |
| "Two Doors Down" | Dolly Parton | Dolly Parton | Walking on Sunshine (Note: When "Walking on Sunshine" was released as a single in August 1999, a maxi-single was released which featured four remixes of "Two Doors Down"; "Boy Wunder Mix Radio Edit", "Cymphonix Radio Mix", "Boy Wunder Mix", and "Cymphonix Extended Mix".) | 1999 | |
| "Two Doors Down" | Dolly Parton | Dolly Parton | Live and Well | 2004 | |
| "Two Doors Down" | Dolly Parton | Dolly Parton | Singer, Songwriter & Legendary Performer | 2007 | |
| "Two Doors Down" | Dolly Parton | Dolly Parton | Live from London | 2009 | |
| "Two Doors Down" | Dolly Parton | Dolly Parton | Live from Glastonbury 2014 | 2016 | |
| "Two Doors Down" | Dolly Parton, Macy Gray and Dorothy | Dolly Parton | Dumplin' | 2018 | |
| "Two Little Orphans" | Dolly Parton | arr. by David Kleiber | Hits Made Famous by Country Queens | 1963 | |
| "Two Lovers" | Dolly Parton | William Robinson | Rainbow | 1987 | |
| "Two of a Kind" | Porter Wagoner and Dolly Parton | Porter Wagoner; Dolly Parton | Two of a Kind | 1971 | |
| "Two of the Lucky Ones" | Hal Ketchum and Dolly Parton | Jon Davis; Sherrié Austin; Will Rambeaux | Lucky Man | 2001 | |
| "Two Sides to Every Story" | Porter Wagoner and Dolly Parton | Bill Owens; Dolly Parton | Just Between You and Me | 1968 | |
| "Two Sides to Every Story" | Porter Wagoner and Dolly Parton | Bill Owens; Dolly Parton | A Real Live Dolly | 1970 | |
| "Tyrant" | Beyoncé and Dolly Parton | Camaron Ochs; David Doman; Dominik Redenczki; Beyoncé Knowles-Carter; Terius Gesteelde-Diamant; Ezemdi Chikwendu | Cowboy Carter | 2024 | |
| "Undercover" | Kenny Rogers featuring Dolly Parton | Dolly Parton | Back to the Well | 2003 | |
| "Unlikely Angel" | Dolly Parton | Dolly Parton | Unlikely Angel (Note: Featured in the 1996 TV movie, Unlikely Angel. A soundtrack album was never released.) | 1996 | |
| "Unlikely Angel" | Dolly Parton | Dolly Parton | Blue Smoke | 2014 | |
| "Unwed Fathers" | Gail Davies with Dolly Parton | Bobby Braddock; John Prine | Where Is a Woman to Go | 1984 | |
| "Violet and a Rose" | Pam Tillis with Dolly Parton | Thresa Auge; John Reinfeld; Little Jimmy Dickens; Mel Tillis | It's All Relative: Tillis Sings Tillis | 2002 | |
| " Viva Las Vegas" | The Grascals with special guest Dolly Parton | Doc Pomus; Mort Shuman | The Grascals | 2005 | |
| "Wabash Cannonball" | Dolly Parton | A.P. Carter | A Real Live Dolly | 1970 | |
| "Wait 'Til I Get You Home" | Dolly Parton duet with Mac Davis | Dolly Parton; Mac Davis | White Limozeen | 1989 | |
| "Waitin' for the Phone to Ring" | Patty Loveless with Dolly Parton and Mac McAnally | Joe Tassi; Bob Tassi | Up Against My Heart | 1991 | |
| "Waldo the Weirdo" | Porter Wagoner and Dolly Parton | Porter Wagoner | Just Between You and Me: The Complete Recordings, 1967–1976 | 2014 | |
| "Walls of My Mind" | Dolly Parton | Dolly Parton | Joshua | 1971 | |
| "Walking on Sunshine" | Dolly Parton | Kimberley Rew | Treasures | 1996 | |
| "Walking on Sunshine" | Dolly Parton | Kimberley Rew | Walking on Sunshine (Note: When "Walking on Sunshine" was released as a single in August 1999, a maxi-single was released featuring two remixes; "Mark Kamin's Radio Mix" and "Mark Kamin's Harder Mix".) | 1999 | |
| "Wanted" | Dolly Parton | | Wanted | 2010 | |
| "Walter Henry Hagen" | Dolly Parton | Dolly Parton | Heartsongs: Live from Home | 1994 | |
| "Waltz Across Texas Tonight" | Dolly Parton, Emmylou Harris and Linda Ronstadt | Emmylou Harris; Rodney Crowell | The Complete Trio Collection | 2016 | |
| "Washday Blues" | Dolly Parton | Porter Wagoner | My Favorite Songwriter, Porter Wagoner | 1972 | |
| "Wasting Love" | Porter Wagoner and Dolly Parton | Porter Wagoner | Love and Music | 1973 | |
| "Wave to the World" | Artists for the Paralympic Games (Note: Keith Urban, Vince Gill, Amy Grant, Dolly Parton, Charlie Daniels, BJ Thomas, Chely Wright, the Bellamy Brothers and others.) | Joe Henry; Gary Burr | Non-album single | 2000 | |
| "Wayfaring Stranger" | Dolly Parton | Traditional arr. by Dolly Parton | Heartsongs: Live from Home | 1994 | |
| "We Can't Let This Happen to Us" | Porter Wagoner and Dolly Parton | Dorothy Jo Hope | Porter Wayne and Dolly Rebecca | 1970 | |
| "We Found It" | Porter Wagoner and Dolly Parton | Porter Wagoner | We Found It | 1973 | |
| "We Got Too Much" | Dolly Parton | Dolly Parton | Real Love | 1985 | |
| "We Had All the Good Things Going" | Dolly Parton | Jerry Monday; Merv Shiner | My Blue Ridge Mountain Boy | 1969 | |
| "We Had It All" | Dolly Parton | Troy Seals; Donnie Fritts | The Great Pretender | 1984 | |
| "We Had It All" | Dolly Parton | Troy Seals; Donnie Fritts | Think About Love (Note: Remixed by Joe Scaife and Mark Wright at Music Mill, Nashville, Tennessee. This version is a completely different vocal take from the version on 1984's The Great Pretender. Instead of the piano being the primary instrument, this version is driven by an acoustic guitar. This remixed version of "We Had It All" was released as a single in January 1986.) | 1986 | |
| "We Irish" | Dolly Parton | Dolly Parton | Live and Well | 2004 | |
| "We Might Be in Love" | Dolly Parton and Billy Dean | Dolly Parton | Blue Valley Songbird | 1999 | |
| "We Three Kings" | Dolly Parton | John Henry Hopkins Jr. arr. by the Mighty Fine Band | Home for Christmas | 1990 | |
| "We Used To" | Dolly Parton | Dolly Parton | Dolly | 1975 | |
| "We'd Have to Be Crazy" | Porter Wagoner and Dolly Parton | Dolly Parton | Porter 'n' Dolly | 1974 | |
| "We'll Get Ahead Someday" | Porter Wagoner and Dolly Parton | Mack Magaha | Just the Two of Us | 1968 | |
| "We'll Sing in the Sunshine" | Dolly Parton | Gale Garnett | The Great Pretender | 1984 | |
| "We're Through Forever ('Til Tomorrow)" | Dolly Parton with Richard Dennison | Blaise Tosti | Heartbreaker | 1978 | |
| "Welcome Home" | Dolly Parton | Dolly Parton | For God and Country | 2003 | |
| "What a Friend We Have in Jesus" | Dolly Parton | Joseph M. Scriven; Charles Converse | Heartsongs: Live from Home | 1994 | |
| "What a Friend We Have in Jesus" | Dolly Parton | Joseph M. Scriven; Charles Converse | Precious Memories | 1999 | |
| "What a Heartache" | Dolly Parton | Dolly Parton | Rhinestone | 1984 | |
| "What a Heartache" | Dolly Parton | Dolly Parton | Eagle When She Flies | 1991 | |
| "What a Heartache" | Dolly Parton | Dolly Parton | Halos & Horns | 2002 | |
| "What Ain't to Be Just Might Happen" | Dolly Parton | Porter Wagoner | My Favorite Songwriter, Porter Wagoner | 1972 | |
| "What Do You Think About Lovin'" | Dolly Parton | Dolly Parton; Bill Owens | Single A-side | 1964 | |
| "What Do You Think About Lovin'" | Dolly Parton and Brenda Lee | Dolly Parton; Bill Owens | The Winning Hand (Note: Overdubbed version of Parton's 1964 recording featuring new duet vocals by Brenda Lee recorded in 1981.) | 1982 | |
| "What Is It My Love" | Dolly Parton | Dolly Parton | White Limozeen | 1989 | |
| "What Will Baby Be" | Dolly Parton | Dolly Parton | Slow Dancing with the Moon | 1993 | |
| "What Will Baby Be" | Dolly Parton | Dolly Parton | Dolly | 2009 | |
| "Whatcha Tryin' to Do to Me?" | Dolly Parton | Dolly Parton | Unlikely Angel | 1996 | |
| "When I Get Where I'm Going" | Brad Paisley featuring Dolly Parton | Rivers Rutherford; George Teren | Time Well Wasted | 2005 | |
| "When I Sing for Him" | Dolly Parton | Porter Wagoner | My Favorite Songwriter, Porter Wagoner | 1972 | |
| "When I Stop Dreaming" | Emmylou Harris with Dolly Parton | Ira Louvin; Charlie Louvin | Luxury Liner | 1976 | |
| "When I Stop Dreaming" | Don Henley and Dolly Parton | Ira Louvin; Charlie Louvin | Cass County | 2015 | |
| "When I'm Gone" | Dolly Parton | Dolly Parton | The Bargain Store | 1975 | |
| "When Jesus Comes Calling for Me" | Dolly Parton | Dolly Parton | Hungry Again | 1998 | |
| "When Johnny Comes Marching Home" | Dolly Parton | Louis Lambert | For God and Country | 2003 | |
| "When Life Is Good Again" | Dolly Parton | Dolly Parton; Kent Wells | Non-album single | 2020 | |
| "When Love Is New" | Dolly Parton and Emmy Rossum | Dolly Parton | Songcatcher | 2001 | |
| "When Possession Gets Too Strong" | Dolly Parton | Dolly Parton; Louis Owens | The Fairest of Them All | 1970 | |
| "When Someone Wants to Leave' | Dolly Parton | Dolly Parton | Jolene | 1974 | |
| "When the Roll Is Called Up Yonder" | Dolly Parton | James Milton Black | Precious Memories | 1999 | |
| "When the Sun Goes Down Tomorrow" | Dolly Parton | Dolly Parton | All I Can Do | 1976 | |
| "When They Ring Those Golden Bells" | Dolly Parton | Dion DeMarbelle | Orthophonic Joy: The 1927 Bristol Sessions Revisited | 2015 | |
| "When We're Gone, Long Gone" | Dolly Parton, Emmylou Harris and Dolly Parton | Kieran Kane; James Paul O'Hara | Trio II | 1999 | |
| "When You Tell Me That You Love Me" | Julio Iglesias duet with Dolly Parton | Albert Hammond; John Bettis | Crazy | 1994 | |
| "Whenever Forever Comes" | Dolly Parton duet with Collin Raye | Allen Shamblin; Austin Cunningham; Chuck Cannon | Slow Dancing with the Moon | 1993 | |
| "Where Beauty Lives in Memory" | Dolly Parton | Dolly Parton | New Harvest...First Gathering | 1977 | |
| "Where Do the Children Play" | Dolly Parton with special guest Yusuf Islam | Yusuf Islam | Those Were the Days | 2005 | |
| "Where Have All the Flowers Gone" | Dolly Parton with special guests Norah Jones and Lee Ann Womack | Pete Seeger | Those Were the Days | 2005 | |
| "Where the Grass Won't Grow" | George Jones with Emmylou Harris, Dolly Parton and Trisha Yearwood | Earl Montgomery | The Bradley Barn Sessions | 1994 | |
| "Where the Soul Never Dies" | Leslie Jordan featuring Dolly Parton | William M. Golden | Company's Comin' | 2021 | |
| "Where Will the Words Come From" | Dolly Parton, Emmylou Harris and Linda Ronstadt | Sonny Curtis; Glen D. Hardin | The Complete Trio Collection | 2016 | |
| "Whispering Hope" | Dolly Parton | Alice Hawthorne arr. by Dolly Parton | For God and Country | 2003 | |
| "White Christmas" | Dolly Parton | Irving Berlin | Once Upon a Christmas | 1984 | |
| "White Limozeen" | Dolly Parton | Dolly Parton; Mac Davis | White Limozeen | 1989 | |
| "Who" | Dolly Parton | Dolly Parton; Linda Perry | Dumplin' | 2018 | |
| "Why" | Dolly Parton and Mavis Staples | Dolly Parton | Dumplin' | 2018 | |
| "Why Can't We" | Dolly Parton | Allen Shamblin; Austin Cunningham; Chuck Cannon | Slow Dancing with the Moon | 1993 | |
| "Why Don't You Haul Off & Love Me" | Porter Wagoner and Dolly Parton | Wayne Raney; Lonnie Glosson | Always, Always | 1969 | |
| "Why, Why, Why" | Dolly Parton | Dolly Parton; Bill Owens | As Long as I Love | 1970 | |
| "Why, Why, Why" | Dolly Parton | Dolly Parton; Bill Owens | Everything's Beautiful (Note: Overdubbed version of Parton's 1967 recording featuring new instrumentation recorded in 1981 for The Winning Hand, but did not make the final track listing.) | 1988 | |
| "Why'd You Come in Here Lookin' Like That" | Dolly Parton | Bob Carlisle; Randy Thomas | White Limozeen | 1989 | |
| "Why'd You Come in Here Lookin' Like That" | Dolly Parton | Bob Carlisle; Randy Thomas | Live from Glastonbury 2014 | 2016 | |
| "Why'd You Come in Here Lookin' Like That" | Dolly Parton | Bob Carlisle; Randy Thomas | Live and Well | 2004 | |
| "Wild Texas Wind" | Dolly Parton | Carl Perkins | Wild Texas Wind | 1991 | |
| "Wildest Dreams" | Dolly Parton | Dolly Parton; Mac Davis | Eagle When She Flies | 1991 | |
| "Wildflowers" | Dolly Parton, Emmylou Harris and Linda Ronstadt | Dolly Parton | Trio | 1987 | |
| "Wildflowers" | Dolly Parton | Dolly Parton | Blue Valley Songbird | 1999 | |
| "Wildflowers" | Dolly Parton, Emmylou Harris and Linda Ronstadt | Dolly Parton | The Complete Trio Collection | 2016 | |
| "Will He Be Waiting" | Dolly Parton | Dolly Parton | Touch Your Woman | 1972 | |
| "Will He Be Waiting" | Dolly Parton | Dolly Parton | The Grass Is Blue | 1999 | |
| "Wings of a Dove" | Dolly Parton | Bob Ferguson | The Golden Streets of Glory | 1971 | |
| "Wings of a Dove" | Dolly Parton, Loretta Lynn and Tammy Wynette | Bob Ferguson | Honky Tonk Angels | 1993 | |
| "Winter Wonderland" | Dolly Parton | Dick Smith; Felix Bernard | Once Upon a Christmas | 1984 | |
| "With Bells On" | Kenny Rogers and Dolly Parton | Dolly Parton | Once Upon a Christmas | 1984 | |
| "With You Gone" | Dolly Parton | Dolly Parton | Heartbreaker | 1978 | |
| "Without You" | Porter Wagoner and Dolly Parton | Dolly Parton | Porter 'n' Dolly | 1974 | |
| "Woke Up in Love" | Dolly Parton and Sylvester Stallone | Dolly Parton | Rhinestone | 1984 | |
| "Woman Up (And Take It Like a Man)" | Dolly Parton | Dolly Parton | Run, Rose, Run | 2022 | |
| "Wonderful Christmas Time" | Chicago featuring Dolly Parton | Paul McCartney | Chicago XXXIII: O Christmas Three | 2011 | |
| "Words" | Barry Gibb featuring Dolly Parton | Barry Gibb; Maurice Gibb; Robin Gibb | Greenfields: The Gibb Brothers' Songbook, Vol. 1 | 2021 | |
| "Working Girl" | Dolly Parton | Dolly Parton | 9 to 5 and Odd Jobs | 1980 | |
| "Working on a Dream" | Dolly Parton | Dolly Parton | Sha-Kon-O-Hey! Land of Blue Smoke | 2009 | |
| "Would You Believe" | Billy Earl and the Kinfolks with Dolly Parton | | Dolly Parton Presents Billy Earl and the Kinfolks | | |
| "Would You Know Him (If You Saw Him" | Dolly Parton | Dolly Parton; Dorothy Jo Hope | Letter to Heaven: Songs of Faith and Inspiration | 2010 | |
| "Wouldn't It Be Great" | Dolly Parton, Loretta Lynn and Tammy Wynette | Loretta Lynn | Honky Tonk Angels | 1993 | |
| "Wrong Direction Home" | Dolly Parton | Dolly Parton | My Tennessee Mountain Home | 1973 | |
| "Wrong Direction Home" | Margo O'Donnell featuring Maura O'Connell and Dolly Parton | Dolly Parton | The Highway of My Life | 1999 | |
| "Yellow Roses" | Dolly Parton | Dolly Parton | White Limozeen | 1989 | |
| "Yes I See God" | Dolly Parton | Dorothy Jo Hope | The Golden Streets of Glory | 1971 | |
| "You" | Porter Wagoner and Dolly Parton | Dolly Parton | Love and Music | 1973 | |
| "You All Come (Y'all Come)" | Dolly Parton | Arlie Diff | A Real Live Dolly | 1970 | |
| "You and Me–Her and Him" | Porter Wagoner and Dolly Parton | Porter Wagoner | Together Always | 1972 | |
| "You Are" | Dolly Parton | Dolly Parton | New Harvest...First Gathering | 1977 | |
| "You Are" | Dolly Parton | Dolly Parton | Live at the Bottom Line | 2015 | |
| "You Are My Christmas" | Dolly Parton featuring Randy Parton | Dolly Parton | A Holly Dolly Christmas | 2020 | |
| "You Can Do It" | Dolly Parton | Dolly Parton | I Believe in You | 2017 | |
| "You Can't Make Old Friends" | Kenny Rogers duet with Dolly Parton | Ryan Hanna King; Caitlyn Smith; Don Schlitz | You Can't Make Old Friends (Note: This recording of "You Can't Make Old Friends" would later be included on Parton's 2014 album, Blue Smoke.) | 2013 | |
| "You Can't Reach Me Anymore" | Dolly Parton | Dolly Parton; Dorothy Jo Hope | Joshua | 1971 | |
| "You Can't Say Love Enough" (JDRF Celebrity Version) | MJ2 and Celebrity Friends (Note: Dolly Parton, Bill Anderson, Heidi Newfield, Cowboy Troy and Wayne Newton.) | Donald Clint Goodman; Samuel Courtney Mizell; William D. Nash | Non-album single | 2009 | |
| "You Don't Knock" | Dolly Parton, Emmylou Harris and Linda Ronstadt | Roebuck Staples; Wesley Westbrooks | The Complete Trio Collection | 2016 | |
| "(You Got Me Over) A Heartache Tonight" | Dolly Parton duet with Billy Dean | Dolly Parton; Larry Weiss | Slow Dancing with the Moon | 1993 | |
| "You Gotta Be" | Dolly Parton | Dolly Parton | I Believe in You | 2017 | |
| "You Gotta Be My Baby" | Dolly Parton | George Jones | A Real Live Dolly | 1970 | |
| "You Gotta Be My Baby" | Dolly Parton | George Jones | Red Hot + Country | 1994 | |
| "You Made a Woman of Me Too Soon" | Dolly Parton | Arthur Thomas | Wanted | 2010 | |
| "You Never Took the Time" | Dolly Parton | Arthur Thomas; Shorty Hall | Wanted | 2010 | |
| "You'll Always Be Special to Me" | Dolly Parton | Merle Haggard | The Bargain Store | 1975 | |
| "You'll Never Be the Sun" | Dolly Parton, Emmylou Harris and Dolly Parton | Donagh Long | Trio II | 1999 | |
| "You're the One That Taught Me How to Swing" | Dolly Parton | Dolly Parton | Love Is Like a Butterfly | 1974 | |
| "You're the Only One" | Dolly Parton | Carole Bayer Sager; Bruce Roberts | Great Balls of Fire | 1979 | |
| "You're the Only One I Ever Needed" | Dolly Parton | Robbie Patton; Linda Mallah | Dolly, Dolly, Dolly | 1980 | |
| "You've Lost That Lovin' Feeling" | Neil Diamond duet with Dolly Parton | Cynthia Weil; Barry Mann; Phil Spector | Up on the Roof: Songs from the Brill Building | 1993 | |
| "Your Gonna Be Sorry" | Dolly Parton | Dolly Parton | Just Because I'm a Woman | 1968 | |
| "Your Kisses Are Charity" | Culture Club featuring Dolly Parton | George O'Dowd; Roy Hay; Mikey Craig; Jon Moss; John Themis | Cold Shoulder | 1999 | |
| "(Your Love Has Lifted Me) Higher and Higher" | Dolly Parton | Gary Jackson; Carl Smith | New Harvest...First Gathering | 1977 | |
| "(Your Love Has Lifted Me) Higher and Higher" | Dolly Parton | Gary Jackson; Carl Smith | Live at the Boarding House | 2006 | |
| "(Your Love Has Lifted Me) Higher and Higher" | Dolly Parton | Gary Jackson; Carl Smith | Live at the Bottom Line | 2015 | |
| "Your Ole Handy Man" | Dolly Parton | Dolly Parton | Hello, I'm Dolly | 1967 | |
| "Yours Love" | Porter Wagoner and Dolly Parton | Harlan Howard | Always, Always | 1969 | |
