= List of awards and nominations received by Dolly Parton =

Dolly Parton awards and nominations
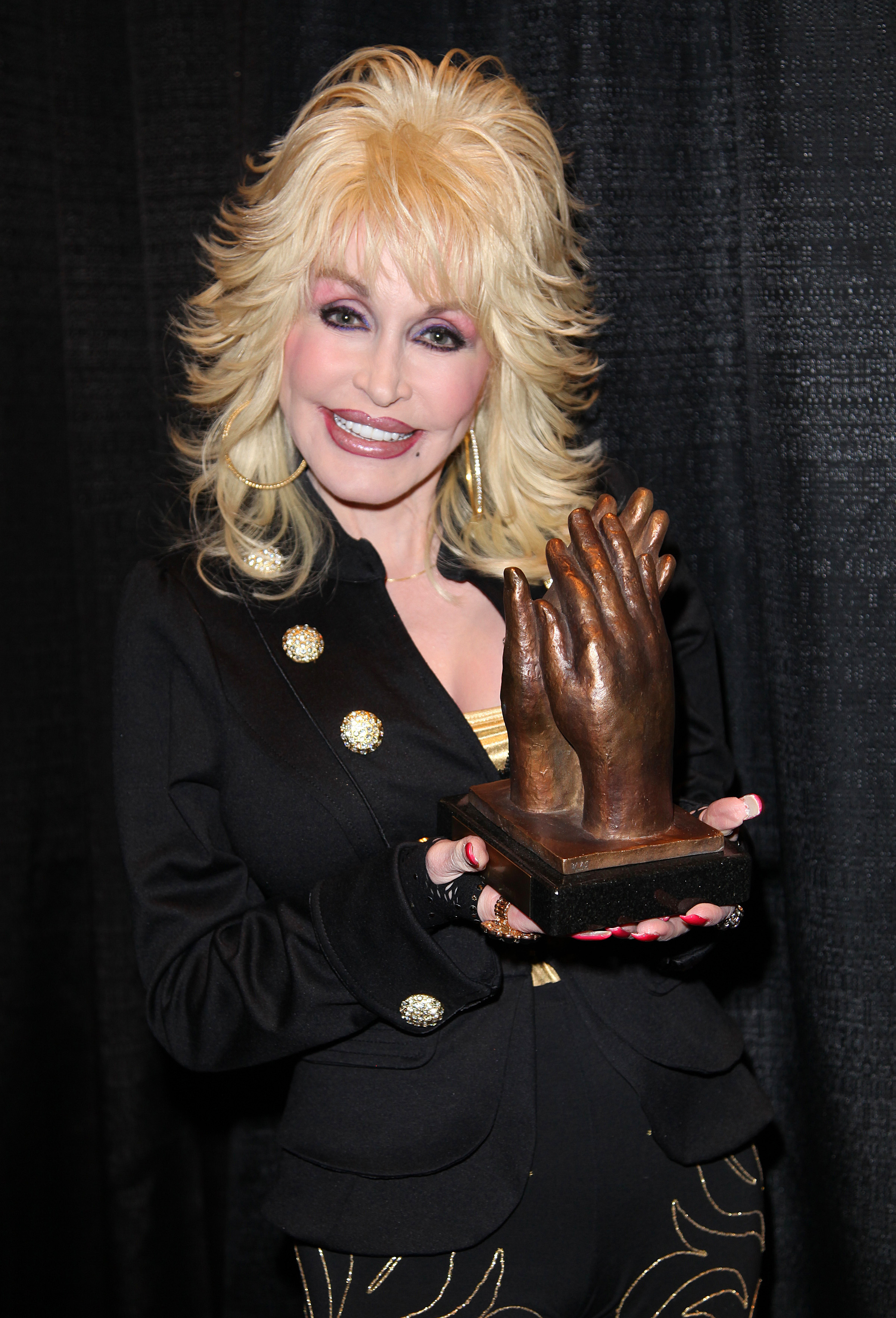
- Parton accepting an Applause Award in 2010
Awards and nominations
Award	Wins	Nominations
Academy Awards	1	2
Academy of Country Music Awards	13	44
American Association of School Administrators	1	1
American Legion	1	1
American Guild of Variety Artists	4	4
American Music Awards	4	18
Association for Independent Music Awards	2	2
BBC	1	1
Billboard	4	4
Billboard Women in Music	1	1
BMI Awards	48	48
Broadway.com Audience Awards	1	1
Canadian Country Music Association Awards	1	1
Cashbox	2	2
Christian Fan Awards	2	2
CMT Music Awards	13	49
CMT Video Awards	2	2
Country Music Association Awards	10	45
Country Radio Broadcasters	1	1
Country Weekly	1	1
'Critics' Choice Movie Awards	0	2
Daughters of the American Revolution	1	1
Drama Desk Awards	0	2
Drama League Awards	0	1
European Country Music Association Awards	1	5
Grammy Awards	11	58

Totals (Note: Certain award groups do not simply award one winner. They acknowledge several different recipients, have runners-up, and have third place. Since this is a specific recognition and is different from losing an award, runner-up mentions are considered wins in this award tally. For simplification and to avoid errors, each award in this list has been presumed to have had a prior nomination.)
- Wins: 190
- Nominations: 387

Dolly Parton was an American singer-songwriter, multi-instrumentalist, actress, author, and philanthropist, best known for her work in country music. She received various accolades including 11 Grammy Awards and a Primetime Emmy Award as well as nominations for two Academy Awards, six Golden Globe Awards and a Tony Award. She was honored with a star on the Hollywood Walk of Fame in 1984, the National Medal of Arts in 2004, the Kennedy Center Honors in 2006, the Grammy Lifetime Achievement Award in 2011 and the Jean Hersholt Humanitarian Award from the Academy of Motion Picture Arts and Sciences in 2025.

Parton was one of the most-honored female country performers of all time. The Recording Industry Association of America has certified 21 of her single and album releases as Gold or Platinum. She had 25 songs reach number one on the Billboard Hot Country Songs chart, second only to Reba McEntire. She had 42 career top-10 country albums, a record for any artist, and 110 career-charted singles over the past 40 years. All-inclusive sales of singles, albums, collaboration records, compilation usage, and paid digital downloads during Parton's career have reportedly topped 100 million records around the world. Parton earned eleven Grammy Awards (including her 2011 Lifetime Achievement Award) and a total of 54 Grammy Award nominations, the second most nominations of any female artist in the history of the prestigious awards, following behind Beyoncé.

At the American Music Awards, she won four awards out of 18 nominations. At the Country Music Association Awards, she won 10 awards out of 45 nominations. At the Academy of Country Music, she won 13 awards and 45 nominations. She was one of only seven female artists (including Reba McEntire, Barbara Mandrell, Shania Twain, Loretta Lynn, Carrie Underwood, and Taylor Swift), to win the Country Music Association's highest honor, Entertainer of the Year (1978). She was awarded a star on the Nashville StarWalk for Grammy winners; and a bronze sculpture on the courthouse lawn in Sevierville. She called that statue of herself in her hometown "the greatest honor", because it came from the people who knew her. Parton was inducted into the Grand Ole Opry in 1969, and in 1986 was named one of Ms. Magazine's Women of the Year. In 1986, she was inducted into the Nashville Songwriters Hall of Fame.

== Major associations ==
=== Academy Awards ===
Year	Category	Nominated work	Result	Ref.
1980	Best Original Song	"9 to 5" from 9 to 5	Nominated	
2005	Best Original Song	"Travelin' Thru" from Transamerica	Nominated	
2025	Jean Hersholt Humanitarian Award	Herself	Honored	

=== Emmy Awards ===
Year	Category	Nominated work	Result	Ref.
Primetime Emmy Awards
1978	Outstanding Performance in a Variety or Music Program	Cher... Special	Nominated	
2017	Outstanding Television Movie	Dolly Parton's Christmas of Many Colors: Circle of Love	Nominated	
2020	Outstanding Television Movie	Dolly Parton's Heartstrings: These Old Bones	Nominated	
2021	Outstanding Television Movie	Dolly Parton's Christmas on the Square	Won	
Midsouth Emmy Awards
2018	Governors' Award for Lifetime Achievement	Dolly Parton	Won	
2018	Outstanding Community Service Program	Smoky Mountains Rise	Won	

=== Golden Globe Awards ===
Year	Category	Nominated work	Result	Ref.
1980	Best Motion Picture Actress – Musical/Comedy	9 to 5	Nominated	
1980	Best Original Song	"9 to 5" (from 9 to 5)	Nominated	
1980	New Star of the Year in a Motion Picture – Female	Herself	Nominated	
1983	Best Motion Picture Actress – Musical/Comedy	The Best Little Whorehouse in Texas	Nominated	
2005	Best Original Song	"Travelin' Thru" (from Transamerica)	Nominated	
2018	Best Original Song	"Girl in the Movies" (from Dumplin')	Nominated	

=== Grammy Awards ===
Year	Category	Nominated work	Result	Ref.
1970	Best Country Vocal Performance by a Duo or Group	"Just Someone I Used to Know" (with Porter Wagoner)	Nominated	
1971	Best Country Vocal Performance, Female	"Mule Skinner Blues (Blue Yodel No. 8)"	Nominated	
1971	Best Country Vocal Performance by a Duo or Group	"Daddy Was an Old Time Preacher Man" (with Porter Wagoner)	Nominated	
1972	Best Country Vocal Performance by a Duo or Group	"Better Move It on Home" (with Porter Wagoner)	Nominated	
1972	Best Sacred Performance	The Golden Streets of Glory	Nominated	
1972	Best Country Vocal Performance, Female	"Joshua"	Nominated	
1973	Best Country Vocal Performance, Female	"Touch Your Woman"	Nominated	
1974	Best Country Vocal Performance by a Duo or Group	"If Teardrops Were Pennies" (with Porter Wagoner)	Nominated	
1975	Best Country Vocal Performance, Female	"Jolene"	Nominated	
1976	Best Country Vocal Performance, Female	"Jolene" (Live)	Nominated	
1977	Best Country Vocal Performance, Female	All I Can Do	Nominated	
1978	Best Pop Vocal Performance, Female	"Here You Come Again"	Nominated	
1978	Best Country Vocal Performance, Female	"(Your Love Has Lifted Me) Higher and Higher"	Nominated	
1979	Best Country Vocal Performance, Female	Here You Come Again	Won	
1982	Song of the Year	"9 to 5"	Nominated	
1982	Best Country Vocal Performance, Female	"9 to 5"	Won	
1982	Best Country Song	"9 to 5"	Won	
1982	Best Score Written for Visual Media	9 to 5 (Original Motion Picture Soundtrack)	Nominated	
1983	Best Country Vocal Performance, Female	"I Will Always Love You"	Nominated	
1984	Best Pop Performance by a Duo or Group	"Islands in the Stream" with Kenny Rogers)	Nominated	
1984	Best Country Vocal Performance, Female	Burlap & Satin	Nominated	
1985	Best Country Vocal Performance, Female	"Tennessee Homesick Blues"	Nominated	
1986	Best Country Vocal Performance, Female	Real Love	Nominated	
1986	Best Country Vocal Performance by a Duo or Group	"Real Love" (with Kenny Rogers)	Nominated	
1988	Best Country Vocal Performance by a Duo or Group	Trio (with Emmylou Harris and Linda Ronstadt)	Won	
1988	Album of the Year	Trio (with Emmylou Harris and Linda Ronstadt)	Nominated	
1990	Best Country Vocal Performance, Female	"Why'd You Come in Here Lookin' Like That"	Nominated	
1992	Best Country Vocal Collaboration	"Rockin' Years" (with Ricky Van Shelton)	Nominated	
1992	Best Country Song	"Eagle When She Flies"	Nominated	
1994	Best Country Vocal Collaboration	"Romeo" (with Billy Ray Cyrus and Friends)	Nominated	
1995	Best Country Vocal Collaboration	"Silver Threads and Golden Needles" (with Loretta Lynn and Tammy Wynette)	Nominated	
1996	Best Country Vocal Collaboration	"I Will Always Love You" (with Vince Gill)	Nominated	
2000	Best Country Vocal Collaboration	"After the Gold Rush" (with Emmylou Harris and Linda Ronstadt)	Won	
2000	Best Country Album	Trio II (with Emmylou Harris and Linda Ronstadt)	Nominated	
2001	Best Bluegrass Album	The Grass Is Blue	Won	
2001	Best Female Country Vocal Performance	"Travelin' Prayer"	Nominated	
2002	Best Female Country Vocal Performance	"Shine"	Won	
2002	Best Bluegrass Album	Little Sparrow	Nominated	
2003	Best Female Country Vocal Performance	"Dagger Through the Heart"	Nominated	
2003	Best Country Album	Halos & Horns	Nominated	
2004	Best Female Country Vocal Performance	"I'm Gone"	Nominated	
2005	Best Country Collaboration with Vocals	"Creepin' In" (with Norah Jones)	Nominated	
2007	Best Country Collaboration with Vocals	"Tomorrow Is Forever" (with Solomon Burke)	Nominated	
2007	Best Song Written for Visual Media	"Travelin' Thru"	Nominated	
2010	Best Musical Show Album	9 to 5: The Musical (Original Broadway Cast Recording)	Nominated	
2011	Grammy Lifetime Achievement Award	Dolly Parton	Won	
2014	Best Country Duo/Group Performance	"You Can't Make Old Friends" (with Kenny Rogers	Nominated	
2017	Best Country Duo/Group Performance	"Jolene" (with Pentatonix)	Won	
2020	Best Contemporary Christian Music Performance/Song	"God Only Knows" (with For King & Country)	Won	
2020	Best Song Written for Visual Media	"Girl in the Movies" from Dumplin'	Nominated	
2021	Best Contemporary Christian Music Performance/Song	"There Was Jesus" (with Zach Williams)	Won	
2022	Best Traditional Pop Vocal Album	A Holly Dolly Christmas	Nominated	
2024	Best Country Solo Performance	"The Last Thing on My Mind"	Nominated	
2025	Best Audio Book, Narration & Storytelling Recording	Behind the Seams: My Life in Rhinestones	Nominated	
2027	Best Country Duo/Group Performance	"Butterfly" (with Zac Brown Band)	Pending	
2027	Best Country Duo/Group Performance	"Light of a Clear Blue Morning" (with Lainey Wilson, Miley Cyrus, Queen Latifah and Reba McEntire)	Pending	
2027	Best Audio Book, Narration & Storytelling Recording	Star of the Show: My Life on Stage	Pending	

=== Tony Awards ===
Year	Category	Nominated work	Result	Ref.
2009	Best Original Score	9 to 5: The Musical	Nominated	

== Awards and nominations ==
Name of the award ceremony, year presented, award category, nominee(s) of the award and the result of the nomination
Award	Year (Note: Indicates the year of ceremony. Each year is linked to the article about the awards held that year, wherever possible.)	Category	Recipient(s)	Result	Ref.
Academy of Country Music Awards	1970	Top Female Vocalist	Dolly Parton	Nominated	
Academy of Country Music Awards	1971	Top Vocal Group	Porter Wagoner and Dolly Parton	Won	
Academy of Country Music Awards	1971	Top Female Vocalist	Dolly Parton	Nominated	
Academy of Country Music Awards	1972	Top Vocal Group	Porter Wagoner and Dolly Parton	Nominated	
Academy of Country Music Awards	1973	Top Female Vocalist	Dolly Parton	Nominated	
Academy of Country Music Awards	1974	Top Female Vocalist	Dolly Parton	Nominated	
Academy of Country Music Awards	1974	Top Vocal Duet or Group	Porter Wagoner and Dolly Parton	Nominated	
Academy of Country Music Awards	1975	Top Vocal Group	Porter Wagoner and Dolly Parton	Nominated	
Academy of Country Music Awards	1975	Top Female Vocalist	Dolly Parton	Nominated	
Academy of Country Music Awards	1976	Top Female Vocalist of the Year	Dolly Parton	Nominated	
Academy of Country Music Awards	1977	Top Female Vocalist of the Year	Dolly Parton	Nominated	
Academy of Country Music Awards	1978	Entertainer of the Year	Dolly Parton	Won	
Academy of Country Music Awards	1978	Top Female Vocalist of the Year	Dolly Parton	Nominated	
Academy of Country Music Awards	1978	Album of the Year – Artist	Here You Come Again	Nominated	
Academy of Country Music Awards	1979	Entertainer of the Year	Dolly Parton	Nominated	
Academy of Country Music Awards	1979	Top Female Vocalist	Dolly Parton	Nominated	
Academy of Country Music Awards	1980	Song of the Year – Artist	"You're the Only One"	Nominated	
Academy of Country Music Awards	1980	Top Female Vocalist	Dolly Parton	Nominated	
Academy of Country Music Awards	1981	Top Female Vocalist	Dolly Parton	Won	
Academy of Country Music Awards	1981	Entertainer of the Year	Dolly Parton	Nominated	
Academy of Country Music Awards	1981	Song of the Year – Artist	"9 to 5"	Nominated	
Academy of Country Music Awards	1981	Single Record of the Year – Artist	"9 to 5"	Nominated	
Academy of Country Music Awards	1982	Entertainer of the Year	Dolly Parton	Nominated	
Academy of Country Music Awards	1982	Album of the Year – Artist	9 to 5 and Odd Jobs	Nominated	
Academy of Country Music Awards	1984	Single Record of the Year – Artist	"Islands in the Stream" (with Kenny Rogers)	Won	
Academy of Country Music Awards	1984	Top Vocal Duet	Kenny Rogers and Dolly Parton	Won	
Academy of Country Music Awards	1985	Top Female Vocalist	Dolly Parton	Nominated	
Academy of Country Music Awards	1988	Album of the Year – Artist	Trio (with Emmylou Harris and Linda Ronstadt)	Won	
Academy of Country Music Awards	1990	Country Music Video of the Year – Artist	"Why'd You Come in Here Lookin' Like That"	Nominated	
Academy of Country Music Awards	1990	Entertainer of the Year	Dolly Parton	Nominated	
Academy of Country Music Awards	1990	Top Female Vocalist	Dolly Parton	Nominated	
Academy of Country Music Awards	1991	Entertainer of the Year	Dolly Parton	Nominated	
Academy of Country Music Awards	1992	Top Vocal Duet	Dolly Parton and Ricky Van Shelton	Nominated	
Academy of Country Music Awards	1996	Top Vocal Duet	Dolly Parton and Vince Gill	Nominated	
Academy of Country Music Awards	2000	Vocal Event of the Year – Artist	"After the Gold Rush" (with Emmylou Harris and Linda Ronstadt)	Nominated	
Academy of Country Music Awards	2005	Vocal Event of the Year – Artist	"Creepin' In" (with Norah Jones)	Nominated	
Academy of Country Music Awards	2006	Video of the Year – Artist	"When I Get Where I'm Going" (with Brad Paisley)	Won	
Academy of Country Music Awards	2006	Vocal Event of the Year – Artist	"When I Get Where I'm Going" (with Brad Paisley)	Won	
Academy of Country Music Awards	2006	Song of the Year – Artist	"When I Get Where I'm Going" (with Brad Paisley)	Nominated	
Academy of Country Music Awards	2007	Cliff Stone Pioneer Award	Dolly Parton	Won	
Academy of Country Music Awards	2009	Jim Reeves International Award	Dolly Parton	Won	
Academy of Country Music Awards	2016	Tex Ritter Film Award	Dolly Parton's Coat of Many Colors	Won	
Academy of Country Music Awards	2017	Video of the Year – Artist	"Forever Country" (among Artists of Then, Now & Forever)	Won	
Academy of Country Music Awards	2017	Gary Haber Lifting Lives Award	Dolly Parton	Won	
American Association of School Administrators	2002	Galaxy Award	Dolly Parton	Won	
American Legion	2004	James V. Day Good Guy Award	Dolly Parton	Won	
American Guild of Variety Artists Awards	1978	Country Star of the Year	Dolly Parton	Won	
American Guild of Variety Artists Awards	1979	Country Star of the Year	Dolly Parton	Won	
American Guild of Variety Artists Awards	1980	Country Star of the Year	Dolly Parton	Won	
American Guild of Variety Artists Awards	1980	Entertainer of the Year	Dolly Parton	Won	
American Music Awards	1977	Favorite Country Female Artist	Dolly Parton	Nominated	
American Music Awards	1978	Favorite Country Album	New Harvest...First Gathering	Won	
American Music Awards	1978	Favorite Country Female Artist	Dolly Parton	Nominated	
American Music Awards	1979	Favorite Country Album	Here You Come Again	Nominated	
American Music Awards	1979	Favorite Country Song	"Here You Come Again"	Nominated	
American Music Awards	1980	Favorite Country Female Artist	Dolly Parton	Nominated	
American Music Awards	1982	Favorite Pop/Rock Female Artist	Dolly Parton	Nominated	
American Music Awards	1982	Favorite Country Female Artist	Dolly Parton	Nominated	
American Music Awards	1984	Favorite Country Song	"Islands in the Stream" (with Kenny Rogers)	Won	
American Music Awards	1984	Favorite Country Band/Duo/Group	Kenny Rogers and Dolly Parton	Nominated	
American Music Awards	1984	Favorite Country Video	"Potential New Boyfriend"	Nominated	
American Music Awards	1985	Favorite Country Song	"Islands in the Stream" (with Kenny Rogers)	Won	
American Music Awards	1985	Favorite Country Female Artist	Dolly Parton	Nominated	
American Music Awards	1986	Favorite Country Female Artist	Dolly Parton	Nominated	
American Music Awards	1990	Favorite Country Female Artist	Dolly Parton	Nominated	
American Music Awards	1992	Favorite Country Female Artist	Dolly Parton	Nominated	
American Music Awards	1994	Favorite Country Female Artist	Dolly Parton	Nominated	
American Music Awards	1994	Favorite Country Song	"Romeo"	Nominated	
Association for Independent Music Awards	2000	Best Bluegrass Album	The Grass Is Blue	Won	
Association for Independent Music Awards	2002	Best Bluegrass Album	Little Sparrow	Won	
BBC	2004	Dolly Parton	International Artist Achievement Award	Won	
Billboard	1978	Country Artist of the Year	Dolly Parton	Won	
Billboard	1978	Country Singles Artist of the Year	Dolly Parton	Won	
Billboard	1978	Bill Williams Memorial Artist of the Year	Dolly Parton	Won	
Billboard	1981	Distinguished Achievement Award	Dolly Parton	Won	
Billboard Women in Music	2020	Hitmaker Award	Dolly Parton	Won	
BMI Awards	1966	Country Award	"Put It Off Until Tomorrow" (performed by Bill Phillips)	Won	
BMI Awards	1971	Country Award	"Daddy Was an Old Time Preacher Man" (with Porter Wagoner)	Won	
BMI Awards	1971	Country Award	"Joshua"	Won	
BMI Awards	1972	Country Award	"The Last One to Touch Me"	Won	
BMI Awards	1974	Country Award	"Jolene"	Won	
BMI Awards	1974	Pop Award / Million-Air	"Jolene"	Won	
BMI Awards	1974	Country Award	"Traveling Man"	Won	
BMI Awards	1975	Country Award	"I Will Always Love You"	Won	
BMI Awards	1975	Country Award	"Kentucky Gambler"	Won	
BMI Awards	1975	Country Award	"Love Is Like a Butterfly"	Won	
BMI Awards	1975	Country Award	"Please Don't Stop Loving Me" (with Porter Wagoner)	Won	
BMI Awards	1976	Country Award	"Say Forever You'll Be Mine" (with Porter Wagoner)	Won	
BMI Awards	1976	Country Award	"The Bargain Store"	Won	
BMI Awards	1976	Country Award	"The Seeker"	Won	
BMI Awards	1977	Country Award	"All I Can Do"	Won	
BMI Awards	1978	Country Award	"Light of a Clear Blue Morning"	Won	
BMI Awards	1978	Country Award	"To Daddy" (performed by Emmylou Harris)	Won	
BMI Awards	1978	Country Award	"Two Doors Down"	Won	
BMI Awards	1978	Pop Award / Million-Air	"Two Doors Down"	Won	
BMI Awards	1979	Country Award	"Baby I'm Burning"	Won	
BMI Awards	1979	Pop Award	"Baby I'm Burning"	Won	
BMI Awards	1979	Country Award	"It's All Wrong, But It's All Right"	Won	
BMI Awards	1979	Country Award	"Two Doors Down"	Won	
BMI Awards	1981	Country Award	"9 to 5"	Won	
BMI Awards	1981	Country Song of the Year	"9 to 5"	Won	
BMI Awards	1981	Pop Award / Million-Air (3 million)	"9 to 5"	Won	
BMI Awards	1981	Pop Song of the Year	"9 to 5"	Won	
BMI Awards	1982	Country Award	"Heartbreak Express"	Won	
BMI Awards	1982	Pop Award	"I Will Always Love You"	Won	
BMI Awards	1982	Country Award	"9 to 5"	Won	
BMI Awards	1983	Country Award	"Everything's Beautiful (In Its Own Way)" (with Willie Nelson)	Won	
BMI Awards	1983	Pop Award	"Everything's Beautiful (In Its Own Way)" (with Willie Nelson)	Won	
BMI Awards	1983	Country Award	"Heartbreak Express"	Won	
BMI Awards	1983	Country Award	"I Will Always Love You"	Won	
BMI Awards	1985	Country Award	"Tennessee Homesick Blues"	Won	
BMI Awards	1990	Country Award	"Yellow Roses"	Won	
BMI Awards	1993	Pop Award	"I Will Always Love You" (performed by Whitney Houston)	Won	
BMI Awards	1993	Pop Song of the Year	"I Will Always Love You" (performed by Whitney Houston)	Won	
BMI Awards	1994	Pop Award	"I Will Always Love You" (performed by Whitney Houston)	Won	
BMI Awards	1995	Pop Award / Million-Air (6 million)	"I Will Always Love You" (performed by Whitney Houston)	Won	
BMI Awards	2003	Icon Award	Dolly Parton	Won	
BMI Awards	2020	Million-Air (1 million)	"Coat of Many Colors"	Won	
BMI Awards	2020	Million-Air (10 million)	"I Will Always Love You"	Won	
BMI Awards	2020	Million-Air (3 million)	"Jolene"	Won	
BMI Awards	2020	Million-Air (1 million)	"The Seeker"	Won	
BMI Awards	2020	Million-Air (2 million)	"Two Doors Down"	Won	
BMI Awards	2020	Million-Air (1 million)	"Yellow Roses"	Won	
BMI Awards	2020	Million-Air (5 million)	"9 to 5"	Won	
Broadway.com Audience Awards	2009	Favorite New Broadway Song	"Get Out and Stay Out" (performed by the Cast of 9 to 5: The Musical)	Won	
Canadian Country Music Association	1985	Top Selling Album of the Year	Once Upon a Christmas (with Kenny Rogers)	Won	
Cashbox Awards	1968	Most Promising Up and Coming Female Artist	Dolly Parton	Won	
Cashbox Awards	1975	Top Female Vocalist – Singles	Dolly Parton	Won	
Cashbox Awards	1975	Top Duo – Singles	Porter Wagoner and Dolly Parton	Won	
Cashbox Awards	1977	Female Entertainer of the Year – Country Albums	Dolly Parton	Won	
Cashbox Awards	1977	Female Vocalist of the Year – Country Albums	Dolly Parton	Won	
Cashbox Awards	1977	Female Vocalist of the Year – Country Singles	Dolly Parton	Won	
Cashbox Awards	1978	Crossover Artist of the Year	Dolly Parton	Won	
Cashbox Awards	1978	Female Entertainer of the Year – Country Albums	Dolly Parton	Won	
Cashbox Awards	1978	Female Vocalist of the Year – Country Albums	Dolly Parton	Won	
Cashbox Awards	1978	Female Vocalists – Highest Debut	"Heartbreaker"	Won	
Cashbox Awards	1979	Composer/Performer of the Year	Dolly Parton	Won	
Christian Fan Awards	2004	Duo of the Year	Dottie Rambo and Dolly Parton	Won	
Christian Fan Awards	2004	Song of the Year	"Stand by the River" (with Dottie Rambo)	Won	
CMT Music Awards	1968	Duet of the Year	Porter Wagoner and Dolly Parton	Won	
CMT Music Awards	1968	Most Promising Female Artist	Dolly Parton	Won	
CMT Music Awards	1969	Duet of the Year	Porter Wagoner and Dolly Parton	Won	
CMT Music Awards	1969	Female Artist of the Year	Dolly Parton	Nominated	
CMT Music Awards	1969	TV show of the Year	The Porter Wagoner Show	Nominated	
CMT Music Awards	1970	Duet of the Year	Porter Wagoner and Dolly Parton	Won	
CMT Music Awards	1970	Female Artist of the Year	Dolly Parton	Nominated	
CMT Music Awards	1970	TV show of the Year	The Porter Wagoner Show	Nominated	
CMT Music Awards	1971	TV show of the Year	The Porter Wagoner Show	Won	
CMT Music Awards	1971	Duet of the Year	Porter Wagoner and Dolly Parton	Nominated	
CMT Music Awards	1972	Duet of the Year	Porter Wagoner and Dolly Parton	Nominated	
CMT Music Awards	1972	Female Artist of the Year	Dolly Parton	Nominated	
CMT Music Awards	1972	TV show of the Year	The Porter Wagoner Show	Nominated	
CMT Music Awards	1973	Duet of the Year	Porter Wagoner and Dolly Parton	Nominated	
CMT Music Awards	1973	TV show of the Year	The Porter Wagoner Show	Nominated	
CMT Music Awards	1974	Duet of the Year	Porter Wagoner and Dolly Parton	Nominated	
CMT Music Awards	1974	Female Artist of the Year	Dolly Parton	Nominated	
CMT Music Awards	1975	Duet of the Year	Porter Wagoner and Dolly Parton	Nominated	
CMT Music Awards	1975	Female Artist of the Year	Dolly Parton	Nominated	
CMT Music Awards	1976	Female Artist of the Year	Dolly Parton	Nominated	
CMT Music Awards	1977	Album of the Year	New Harvest...First Gathering	Nominated	
CMT Music Awards	1978	Female Artist of the Year	Dolly Parton	Nominated	
CMT Music Awards	1978	Songwriter of the Year	Dolly Parton	Nominated	
CMT Music Awards	1979	Female Artist of the Year	Dolly Parton	Nominated	
CMT Music Awards	1981	Female Artist of the Year	Dolly Parton	Nominated	
CMT Music Awards	1984	Duet of the Year	Kenny Rogers and Dolly Parton	Nominated	
CMT Music Awards	1984	Single of the Year	"Islands in the Stream" (with Kenny Rogers)	Nominated	
CMT Music Awards	1985	Duet of the Year	Kenny Rogers and Dolly Parton	Nominated	
CMT Music Awards	1985	TV special the Year	Kenny & Dolly: Real Love	Nominated	
CMT Music Awards	1986	Duet of the Year	Kenny Rogers and Dolly Parton	Nominated	
CMT Music Awards	1987	TV special of the Year	A Smoky Mountain Christmas	Nominated	
CMT Music Awards	1988	Vocal Collaboration of the Year	Trio (with Emmylou Harris and Linda Ronstadt)	Won	
CMT Music Awards	1988	Album of the Year	Trio (with Emmylou Harris and Linda Ronstadt)	Won	
CMT Music Awards	1988	TV series the Year	Dolly	Nominated	
CMT Music Awards	1990	Video of the Year	"Why'd You Come in Here Lookin' Like That"	Nominated	
CMT Music Awards	1992	Vocal Collaboration of the Year	"Rockin' Years" (with Ricky Van Shelton)	Won	
CMT Music Awards	1992	Video of the Year	"Rockin' Years" (with Ricky Van Shelton)	Won	
CMT Music Awards	1994	Living Legend Award	Dolly Parton	Won	
CMT Music Awards	1994	Minnie Pearl Humanitarion Award	Dolly Parton	Won	
CMT Music Awards	1994	Vocal Event of the Year	"Romeo" (with Billy Ray Cyrus and Friends)	Won	
CMT Music Awards	1994	Album of the Year	Honky Tonk Angels (with Loretta Lynn and Tammy Wynette)	Nominated	
CMT Music Awards	1994	Vocal Collaboration of the Year	Honky Tonk Angels (with Loretta Lynn and Tammy Wynette)	Nominated	
CMT Music Awards	1996	Single of the Year	"I Will Always Love You" (with Vince Gill)	Nominated	
CMT Music Awards	1996	Vocal Collaboration of the Year	"I Will Always Love You" (with Vince Gill)	Nominated	
CMT Music Awards	1997	Vocal Collaboration of the Year	"I Will Always Love You" (with Vince Gill)	Nominated	
CMT Music Awards	2000	Vocal Event of the Year	"After the Gold Rush" (with Emmylou Harris and Linda Ronstadt)	Won	
CMT Music Awards	2002	Flameworthy Female Video of the Year	"Shine"	Nominated	
CMT Music Awards	2006	Most Inspiring Video of the Year	"When I Get Where I'm Going" (with Brad Paisley)	Won	
CMT Music Awards	2006	Collaborative Video of the Year	"When I Get Where I'm Going" (with Brad Paisley)	Nominated	
CMT Video Awards	1994	Video Event of the Year	"Romeo" (with Billy Ray Cyrus and Friends)	Won	
CMT Video Awards	1999	Video Event of the Year	"After the Gold Rush" (with Emmylou Harris and Linda Ronstadt)	Won	
Country Music Association Awards	1968	Vocal Group of the Year	Porter Wagoner and Dolly Parton	Won	
Country Music Association Awards	1968	Female Vocalist of the Year	Dolly Parton	Nominated	
Country Music Association Awards	1969	Female Vocalist of the Year	Dolly Parton	Nominated	
Country Music Association Awards	1969	Vocal Group of the Year	Porter Wagoner and Dolly Parton	Nominated	
Country Music Association Awards	1970	Vocal Duo of the Year	Porter Wagoner and Dolly Parton	Won	
Country Music Association Awards	1970	Female Vocalist of the Year	Dolly Parton	Nominated	
Country Music Association Awards	1971	Vocal Duo of the Year	Porter Wagoner and Dolly Parton	Won	
Country Music Association Awards	1971	Female Vocalist of the Year	Dolly Parton	Nominated	
Country Music Association Awards	1972	Album of the Year	Coat of Many Colors	Nominated	
Country Music Association Awards	1972	Female Vocalist of the Year	Dolly Parton	Nominated	
Country Music Association Awards	1972	Vocal Duo of the Year	Porter Wagoner and Dolly Parton	Nominated	
Country Music Association Awards	1973	Vocal Duo of the Year	Porter Wagoner and Dolly Parton	Nominated	
Country Music Association Awards	1974	Female Vocalist of the Year	Dolly Parton	Nominated	
Country Music Association Awards	1974	Vocal Duo of the Year	Porter Wagoner and Dolly Parton	Nominated	
Country Music Association Awards	1975	Female Vocalist of the Year	Dolly Parton	Won	
Country Music Association Awards	1975	Vocal Duo of the Year	Porter Wagoner and Dolly Parton	Nominated	
Country Music Association Awards	1976	Female Vocalist of the Year	Dolly Parton	Won	
Country Music Association Awards	1976	Entertainer of the Year	Dolly Parton	Nominated	
Country Music Association Awards	1977	Entertainer of the Year	Dolly Parton	Nominated	
Country Music Association Awards	1977	Female Vocalist of the Year	Dolly Parton	Nominated	
Country Music Association Awards	1978	Entertainer of the Year	Dolly Parton	Won	
Country Music Association Awards	1978	Album of the Year	Here You Come Again	Nominated	
Country Music Association Awards	1978	Female Vocalist of the Year	Dolly Parton	Nominated	
Country Music Association Awards	1978	Single of the Year	"Here You Come Again"	Nominated	
Country Music Association Awards	1981	Album of the Year	9 to 5 and Odd Jobs	Nominated	
Country Music Association Awards	1984	Single of the Year	"Islands in the Stream" (with Kenny Rogers)	Nominated	
Country Music Association Awards	1984	Vocal Duo of the Year	Kenny Rogers and Dolly Parton	Nominated	
Country Music Association Awards	1985	Vocal Duo of the Year	Kenny Rogers and Dolly Parton	Nominated	
Country Music Association Awards	1986	Vocal Duo of the Year	Kenny Rogers and Dolly Parton	Nominated	
Country Music Association Awards	1987	Album of the Year	Trio (with Emmylou Harris and Linda Ronstadt)	Nominated	
Country Music Association Awards	1987	Female Vocalist of the Year	Dolly Parton	Nominated	
Country Music Association Awards	1988	Vocal Event of the Year	Trio (Dolly Parton, Emmylou Harris and Linda Ronstadt)	Won	
Country Music Association Awards	1989	Music Video of the Year	"Why'd You Come in Here Lookin' Like That"	Nominated	
Country Music Association Awards	1991	Vocal Event of the Year	Dolly Parton and Ricky Van Shelton	Nominated	
Country Music Association Awards	1994	Album of the Year	Tribute to the Music of Bob Wills and the Texas Playboys (Asleep at the Wheel with various artists)	Nominated	
Country Music Association Awards	1994	Vocal Event of the Year	Dolly Parton, Loretta Lynn and Tammy Wynette	Nominated	
Country Music Association Awards	1996	Vocal Event of the Year	"I Will Always Love You" (with Vince Gill)	Won	
Country Music Association Awards	1999	Vocal Event of the Year	Trio II (with Emmylou Harris and Linda Ronstadt)	Nominated	
Country Music Association Awards	2003	Female Vocalist of the Year	Dolly Parton	Nominated	
Country Music Association Awards	2004	Musical Event of the Year	"Creepin' In" (with Norah Jones)	Nominated	
Country Music Association Awards	2006	Musical Event of the Year	"When I Get Where I'm Going" (with Brad Paisley)	Won	
Country Music Association Awards	2006	Music Video of the Year	"When I Get Where I'm Going" (with Brad Paisley)	Nominated	
Country Music Association Awards	2006	Single of the Year	"When I Get Where I'm Going" (with Brad Paisley)	Nominated	
Country Music Association Awards	2014	Musical Event of the Year	"You Can't Make Old Friends" (with Kenny Rogers)	Nominated	
Country Music Association Awards	2016	Willie Nelson Lifetime Achievement Award	Dolly Parton	Won	
Country Radio Broadcasters	2005	Career Achievement Award	Dolly Parton	Won	
Country Weekly	2003	Career Achievement Award	Dolly Parton	Won	
Critics' Choice Movie Awards	2005	Best Song	"Travlin' Thru" from Transamerica	Nominated	
Critics' Choice Movie Awards	2018	Best Song	"Girl in the Movies" from Dumplin'	Nominated	
Daughters of the American Revolution	2009	Founders Medal for Education	Dolly Parton	Won	
Drama Desk Awards	2009	Outstanding Lyrics	9 to 5: The Musical	Nominated	
Drama Desk Awards	2009	Outstanding Music	9 to 5: The Musical	Nominated	
Drama League Awards	2009	Distinguished Productions of a Musical	9 to 5: The Musical	Nominated	
European Country Music Association Awards	2001	Female Vocalist of the Year	Dolly Parton	Nominated	
European Country Music Association Awards	2006	Vocal Collaboration of the Year	"Thank God I'm a Country Boy" (with Roy Rivers)	Won	
European Country Music Association Awards	2006	Song of the Year	"Thank God I'm a Country Boy" (with Roy Rivers)	Nominated	
European Country Music Association Awards	2006	Female Vocalist of the Year	Dolly Parton	Nominated	
European Country Music Association Awards	2008	Indie Album of the Year	Backwoods Barbie	Nominated	
Fennecus Awards	1982	Best Song Score	The Best Little Whorehouse in Texas (with Carol Hall and Patrick Williams)	Nominated	
Georgia Film Critics Association Awards	2019	Best Original Song	"Girl in the Movies" from Dumplin'	Nominated	
GLAAD Media Awards	2020	Best Individual Television Episode	Dolly Parton's Heartstrings: Two Doors Down	Won	
GMA Dove Award	2004	Country Recorded Song of the Year	"Stand by the River" (with Dottie Rambo)	Nominated	
GMA Dove Award	2005	Country Recorded Song of the Year	"When I Get Where I'm Going" (with Brad Paisley)	Nominated	
GMA Dove Award	2015	Bluegrass Song of the Year	"Daddy Was an Old Time Preacher Man" (Volume Five featuring Rhonda Vincent; Dolly Parton, songwriter)	Nominated	
GMA Dove Award	2020	Short Form Video of the Year	"God Only Knows" (with For King & Country)	Won	
Golden Raspberry Awards	1985	Worst Original Song	"Drinkin'stein" from Rhinestone	Won	
Golden Raspberry Awards	1985	Worst Original Song	"Sweet Lovin' Friends" from Rhinestone	Nominated	
Golden Raspberry Awards	1985	Worst Musical Score	Rhinestone	Nominated	
Governor's Awards for the Arts	2003	Lifetime Achievement Award	Dolly Parton	Won	
Grand Master Fiddler Championship	2009	Dr. Perry F. Harris Award	Dolly Parton	Won	
Guild of Music Supervisors Awards	2019	Best Song/Recording Created for a Film	"Girl in the Movies" from Dumplin'	Nominated	
Library of Congress	2004	Living Legend Award	Dolly Parton	Won	
International Bluegrass Music Awards	2000	Album of the Year	The Grass Is Blue	Won	
International Bluegrass Music Awards	2000	Best Female Vocalist	Dolly Parton	Nominated	
International Bluegrass Music Awards	2001	Best Female Vocalist	Dolly Parton	Nominated	
International Bluegrass Music Awards	2002	Recorded Event of the Year	Clinch Mountain Sweethearts (Ralph Stanley and Friends)	Won	
International Bluegrass Music Awards	2004	Recorded Event of the Year	Livin', Lovin', Losin': Songs of the Louvin Brothers (with various artists)	Won	
International Bluegrass Music Awards	2017	Gospel Recorded Performance of the Year	"Sacred Memories" (Joe Mullins and the Radio Ramblers with Ricky Skaggs and Sharon White Skaggs; Dolly Parton, songwriter)	Won	
International Country Gospel Music Association	2003	Single of the Year	"Hello God"	Won	
K-Love Fan Awards	2021	Song of the Year	"There Was Jesus" (with Zach Williams)	Won	
Los Angeles Drama Critics Circle Awards	2009	Best Musical Score	9 to 5: The Musical	Won	
Ms. Magazine	1986	Woman of the Year	Dolly Parton	Won	
MusiCares	2019	MusiCares Person of the Year	Dolly Parton	Won	
Nashville Songwriters Association International	1968	Songwriter Achievement Award	"Put It Off Until Tomorrow" (performed by Bill Phillips)	Won	
Nashville Songwriters Association International	1971	Songwriter Achievement Award	"Daddy Was an Old Time Preacher Man" (with Porter Wagoner)	Won	
Nashville Songwriters Association International	1972	Songwriter Achievement Award	"Coat of Many Colors"	Won	
Nashville Songwriters Association International	1974	Songwriter Achievement Award	"Jolene"	Won	
Nashville Songwriters Association International	1975	Songwriter Achievement Award	"Jolene"	Won	
Nashville Songwriters Association International	1975	Songwriter Achievement Award	"Love Is Like a Butterfly"	Won	
Nashville Songwriters Association International	1975	Songwriter Achievement Award	"Kentucky Gambler" (performed by Merle Haggard)	Won	
Nashville Songwriters Association International	1976	Songwriter Achievement Award	"The Seeker"	Won	
Nashville Songwriters Association International	1979	Songwriter Achievement Award	"Two Doors Down"	Won	
Nashville Songwriters Association International	1982	Songwriter Achievement Award	"9 to 5"	Won	
Nashville Songwriters Association International	1991	Songwriter Achievement Award	"Eagle When She Flies"	Won	
Nashville Songwriters Association International	1992	Songwriter Achievement Award	"I Will Always Love You" (performed by Whitney Houston)	Won	
Nashville Songwriters Association International	1995	Songwriter Achievement Award	"I Will Always Love You" (with Vince Gill)	Won	
Nashville Songwriters Association International	2012	Song of the Year	"I Will Always Love You" (performed by Whitney Houston)	Won	
NashvilleREAD	2004	Reading Works Award	Dolly Parton	Won	
National State Teachers of the Year	2002	Chasing Rainbows Award	Dolly Parton	Won	
Ovation Awards	2009	Best Book/Lyrics/Music for an Original Musical	9 to 5: The Musical	Nominated	
Parents as Teachers National Center	2003	Child and Family Advocacy Award	Dolly Parton	Won	
People's Choice Awards	1981	Favorite Song from a Motion Picture	"9 to 5" from 9 to 5	Won	
People's Choice Awards	1988	Favorite Female Performer in a New TV Program	Dolly Parton in Dolly	Won	
People's Choice Awards	1988	Favorite All-Around Female Entertainer	Dolly Parton	Won	
People's Choice Awards	1992	Favorite Female Country Artist	Dolly Parton	Nominated	
People's Choice Awards	1993	Favorite Female Country Artist	Dolly Parton	Nominated	
People's Choice Awards	1994	Favorite Female Country Artist	Dolly Parton	Nominated	
People's Choice Awards	2005	Favorite Combined Forces	Dolly Parton and Norah Jones for "The Grass Is Blue" (Live at the 37th Annual Country Music Association Awards)	Nominated	
People's Choice Awards	2015	Favorite Female Country Artist	Dolly Parton	Nominated	
People's Choice Awards	2017	Favorite Female Country Artist	Dolly Parton	Nominated	
Record World Awards	1975	Tom Female Vocalist — Singles	Dolly Parton	Won	
Record World Awards	1977	Tom Female Vocalist — Album	Dolly Parton	Won	
Sevierville Chamber of Commerce	1989	Citizen of the Year	Dolly Parton	Won	
Sierra Awards	2005	Best Song	"Travelin' Thru" (from Transamerica)	Won	
Songwriters Hall of Fame	2007	Johnny Mercer Award	Dolly Parton	Won	
Soul Train Music Awards	1994	Song of the Year	"I Will Always Love You" (performed by Whitney Houston)	Won	
Stennis Center for Public Service	2006	Lindy Boggs Award	Dolly Parton	Won	
The Tennessean	2006	Tennessean of the Year	Dolly Parton	Won	
The Tennessean	2016	Tennessean of the Year	Dolly Parton	Won	
Theatre Fans' Choice Awards	2009	Best Original Score	9 to 5: The Musical	Won	
TV Land Awards	2009	Most Memorable Female Guest Star in a Comedy as herself	Dolly Parton in Designing Women, "The First Day of the Last Decade of the Entire Twentieth Century, Part 1 and Part 2"	Won	
United States Congress	2005	National Medal of Arts	Dolly Parton	Won	
United States Fish and Wildlife Service	2003	Partnership Award	Dolly Parton	Won	
Woodrow Wilson International Center for Scholars of the Smithsonian Institution	2007	Woodrow Wilson Public Service Award	Dolly Parton	Won	

== Honorary awards ==
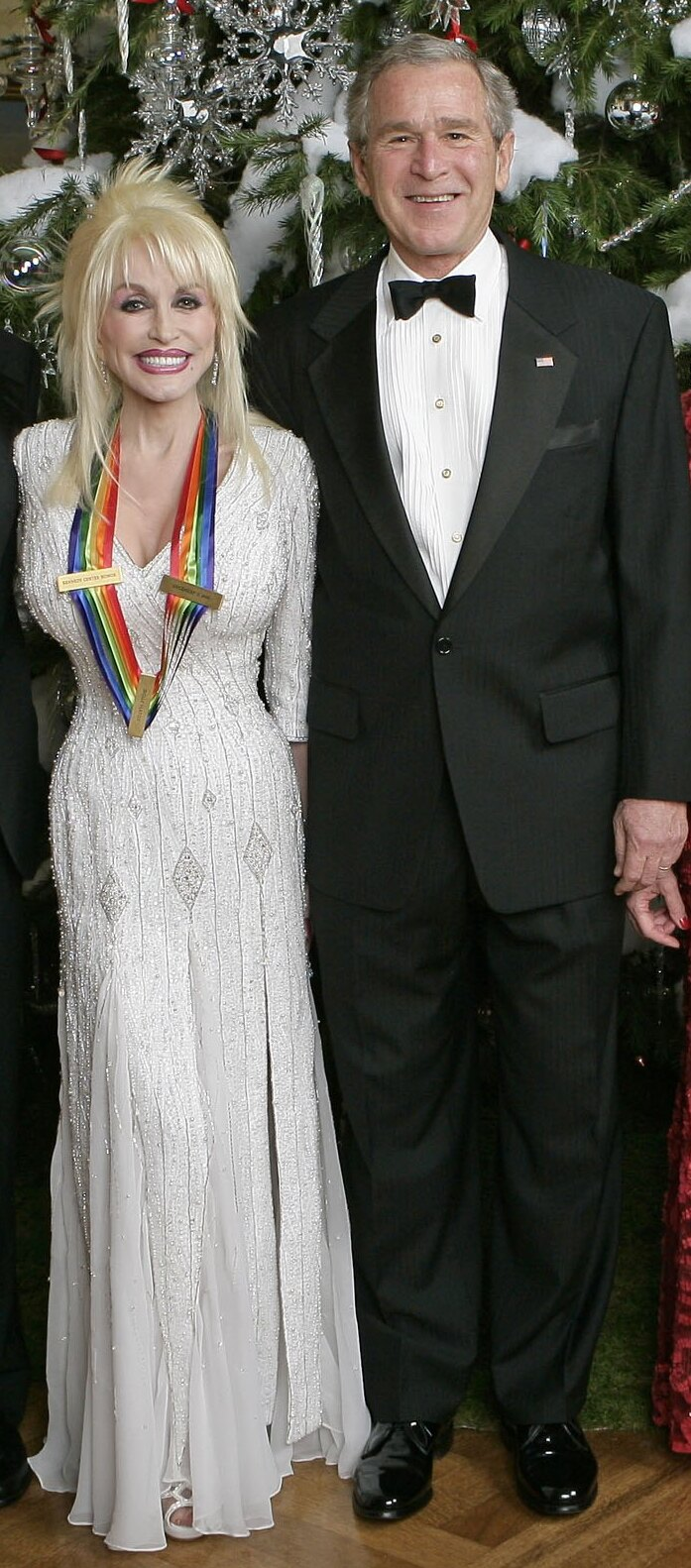
Parton among 2006 Kennedy Center honorees by president George W. Bush

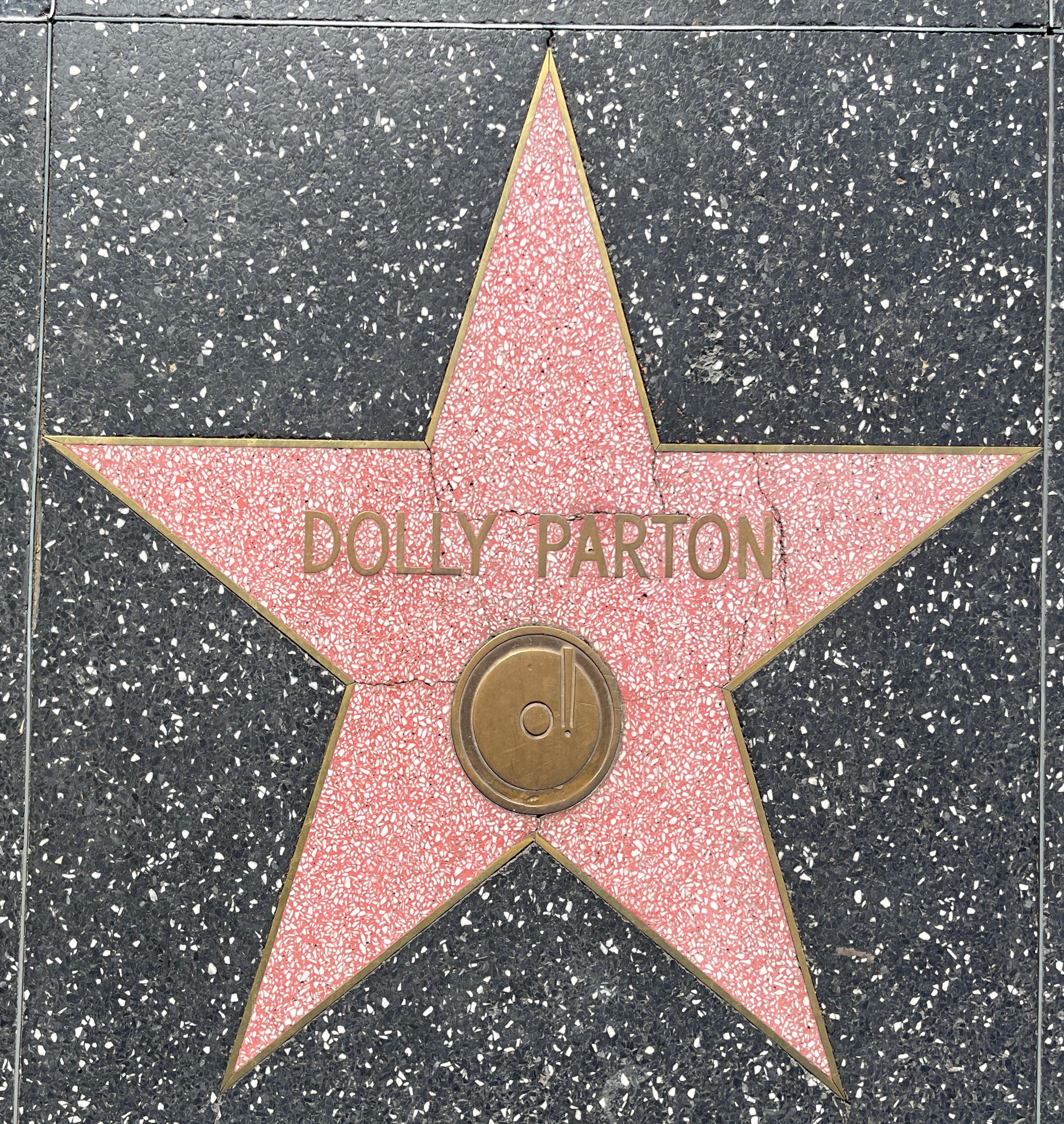
Parton's original star on the Hollywood Walk of Fame

Name of the organization, year presented and the title of honor
Organization	Year	Honor	Ref(s).
American Library Association	2023	Honorary Membership	
Association of American Publishers	2000	AAP Honors	
Carson–Newman College	1990	Honorary Doctorate of Letters Degree	
Country Gospel Music Hall of Fame	2010	Inducted	
Country Music Association	1993	Country Music Honors	
Country Music Hall of Fame	1999	Inducted	
East Tennessee Business Hall of Fame	2003	Inducted	
East Tennessee Educational Association Convention	1988	Guest Speaker	
East Tennessee Hall of Fame for the Performing Arts	1988	Inducted	
Good Housekeeping	2001	Seal of Approval	
Gospel Music Association Hall of Fame	2008	Inducted	
Grammy Hall of Fame	2007	"I Will Always Love You" (1974 recording) inducted	
Grammy Hall of Fame	2014	"Jolene" (1974 recording) inducted	
Grammy Hall of Fame	2019	"Coat of Many Colors" (1971 recording) inducted	
Grand Ole Opry	1969	Member	
Guinness World Records	2018	Most decades with a Top 20 hit on the US Hot Country Songs chart	
Guinness World Records	2018	Most hits on the US Hot Country Songs chart by a female artist	
Hollywood Chamber of Commerce	1984	Star on Hollywood Walk of Fame (Dolly Parton)	
Hollywood Chamber of Commerce	2019	Star on Hollywood Walk of Fame (Note: with (The Trio, with Emmylou Harris and Linda Ronstadt))	
International Association of Amusement Parks and Attractions	2000	Keynote Speaker	
John F. Kennedy Center for the Performing Arts	2006	Kennedy Center Honors	
Library of Congress, National Recording Registry	2012	"Coat of Many Colors" (1971 recording) inducted	
Music City Walk of Fame	2009	Star on Music City Walk of Fame	
New Orleans Mardi Gras Parade	1988	Grand Marshall	
National Drop-Out Prevention Conference	1990	Guest Speaker	
National PTA Convention	2003	Keynote Speaker	
Rock and Roll Hall of Fame	2022	Inducted	
Small Town of America Hall of Fame	1988	Inducted	
Songwriters Hall of Fame	2001	Inducted	
StarWalk	1988	Inducted	
University of Tennessee	2009	Honorary Doctorate of Humane and Musical Letters Degree	
American Academy of Achievement	1992	Inducted	

== Hall of Fame honors ==
During her career, Parton had gained induction into numerous Halls of Fame. Those honors include:

- Nashville Songwriters Hall of Fame (1986)
- Small Town of America Hall of Fame (1988)
- East Tennessee Hall of Fame (1988)
- Country Music Hall of Fame (1999)
- Songwriters Hall of Fame (2001)
- Junior Achievement of East Tennessee Business Hall of Fame (2003)
- The Americana Highway Hall of Fame (2006)
- Grammy Hall of Fame – "I Will Always Love You – 1974 Recording" (2007)
- Blue Ridge Music Hall of Fame – Songwriter Category (2008)
- Gospel Music Hall of Fame (2009)
- Music City Walk of Fame (2009)
- Country Gospel Music Hall of Fame (2010)
- Grammy Hall of Fame – "Jolene – 1974 Recording" (2014)
- The National Hall of Fame for Mountain Artisans (2014)
- The Happiness Hall of Fame (2016)
- East Tennessee Writers Hall of Fame (2019)
- Nashville Entrepreneurs Hall of Fame (2019)
- Grammy Hall of Fame – "Coat of Many Colors – 1971 Recording" (2019)
- Grammy Hall of Fame – "Trio w/ Linda Ronstadt and Emmylou Harris (Album)" (2021)
- Rock and Roll Hall of Fame (2022)
- International Association of Amusement Parks and Attractions Hall of Fame (2025)
- Licensing International Hall of Fame (2025)
- Volunteer State Music Hall of Fame (2025)
- Musicians Hall of Fame (2026)
- The TASTE Hall of Fame (2026)
- The National Rhythm & Blues Hall of Fame (2027)
