= Straight Talk (soundtrack) =

Soundtrack album by Dolly Parton
- Released: March 31, 1992
- Recorded: c. December 1991
- Genres: Country; pop
- Length: 40:49
- Label: Hollywood

Dolly Parton chronology
Eagle When She Flies (1991)	Straight Talk (1992)	Slow Dancing with the Moon (1993)

Singles from Straight Talk
- 1. "Straight Talk" Released: March 16, 1992; 2. "Light of a Clear Blue Morning" Released: June 1, 1992; 3. "Burning" Released: October 12, 1992

Straight Talk is the soundtrack to the 1992 film of the same name starring Dolly Parton and James Woods. Composed of ten original Parton compositions (including a rerecording of her 1976 composition "Light of a Clear Blue Morning"), the album reached #22 on the US country albums charts. Two singles were released: the title track and "Light of a Clear Blue Morning". The music video for "Straight Talk" was directed by Dominic Orlando at the SIR Stage in Hollywood, CA. The video's guest musicians included Russ Kunkel, C. J. Vanston, Kenny Gradney, Steve Farris, and Greg Ladanyi.

== Critical reception ==
Professional ratings
Review scores
Source	Rating
AllMusic	3/5 stars
Orlando Sentinel	1/3 stars
The Encyclopedia of Popular Music	2/5 stars

In a mixed review for AllMusic, Brian Mansfield said the "results vary, depending on how far Parton strays from her Appalachian roots" on the album. He praised Parton's new version of "Light of a Clear Blue Morning", saying that it "polishes up nicely—all the L.A. glitz in the world can't hide the pure gospel beauty of that chorus." He criticized the title track as not "nearly as strong as Parton's other big movie hit, but the way she sings it makes it nearly irresistible," but he felt that even Parton's "distinctive voice...can't save "Fish Out of Water" and "Thought I Couldn't Dance".

== Track listing ==
All songs written by Dolly Parton.

1. "Blue Grace" - 1:03
2. "Light of a Clear Blue Morning" - 4:11
3. "Dirty Job" - 4:51
4. "Blue Me" - 4:51
5. "Straight Talk" - 3:20
6. "Fish Out of Water" - 5:02
7. "Burning" - 4:12
8. "Livin' a Lie" - 4:53
9. "Thought I Couldn't Dance" - 3:58
10. "Burning to Burned" - 3:09
11. "Light of a Clear Blue Morning (Reprise)" - 1:19

== Charts ==
Chart (1992)	Peak position
US Top Country Albums (Billboard)	22
US Billboard 200	138
Canadian RPM Country Albums	28
US Cash Box Top 200 Albums	109
