= Dolly & Carol in Nashville =

- TV Guide ad
- Written by: Roger Beatty; Ken Welch; Mitzie Welch
- Directed by: Roger Beatty
- Starring: Dolly Parton; Carol Burnett; The Joe Layton Dancers
- Music by: Ken Welch; Mitzie Welch
- Country of origin: United States
- Original language: English

Production
- Producer: Joe Hamilton
- Running time: 60 minutes

Original release
- Network: CBS
- Release: February 14, 1979

Dolly & Carol in Nashville is a television special starring Dolly Parton and Carol Burnett that was shot at The Grand Ole Opry and broadcast on CBS on Valentine's Day in 1979. It was part of a promotional campaign for Parton's recent album, Heartbreaker.

== Program ==
The show opens with Dolly and Carol singing "What Am I Doing Up Here?" (frequently referred to as the "Pedestal Song") a comical number in which each declares the other belongs on a pedestal. As they sing, the boxes that they're seated on each rise into the air.

The next scene begins with a rendition of "Orange Blossom Special", but Carol fumbles with the banjo and proclaims, "No one picks like a Nashville picker picks." Seizing the opportunity, Dolly turns this line into a rousing song, and they soon find accompaniment from various musicians who are planted in the audience.

Next, Parton performs a gospel medley in the empty Ryman Auditorium, bookended by performances with Carol and a choir at the newer Opry house.

The show's only sketch features the stars as little girls. Trudy (Parton) is whiny and ignored by the boys, Marcy (Burnett) is a tomboy. The music of the Grand Ole Opry on the radio provides transitions through time as the girls age, featuring a few vintage radio introductions (Roy Acuff, Minnie Pearl, Marty Robbins) as the dancers pantomime to old country hits. Once they reach puberty, the children's roles suddenly reverse, as all of the boys lavish affections upon the busty Trudy. Eventually, we’re introduced to Trudy's daughter, Bonnie (Lindy Speight), and Marcy's daughter, Ellie (Erin Hamilton), who are just like their mothers. Trudy and Marcy then perform "Turn Around (Where Are You Going, My Little One?)."

The duo then performs a 9-minute medley of "heart" songs, which includes Parton's "Heartbreaker".

Dressed in frilly gowns, Carol and Dolly do a little song and dance routine, "It's a Kick (Kickin' Around with You)". They're soon interrupted by The Joe Layton Dancers, which segues into "No One Kicks Like a Nashville Kicker Kicks." As the number ends, the dancers surround the ladies with bouquets as members of the audience pelt the stars with flowers.

The ladies sing a brief reprise of "What Am I Doing Up Here?" and the credits roll.

== Production & Release ==
Production occurred in January 1979 at the Grand Ole Opry House and Ryman Auditorium, with the bulk of filming occurring on the 9th and 10th. In a 2016 interview, Burnett misremembered that filming occurred around Thanksgiving, remarking that Parton had generously cooked a feast. It was Burnett's first special following the cancellation of her long-running variety show (although between, she starred in the feature-length pilot The Grass Is Always Greener Over the Septic Tank), and real-life daughter Erin Hamilton portrayed her child in the Girl Friends sketch.

The show was strategically timed to tie into a Valentine's Day promotional campaign for Parton's latest album, Heartbreaker. RCA Records provided over 3,000 American radio stations copies of the album and heart-shaped candy boxes for giveaways. Participating stations designed their own contests, which included drawings, call-ins, poetry competitions, and more.

== Cast ==
- Dolly Parton (Self/Trudy)
- Carol Burnett (Self/Marcy)
- Erin Hamilton (Ellie)
- Lindy Speight (Bonnie)
- Tony Lyons (Grand Ole Opry Announcer)
- John Faulk (Johnny)

=== Dancers ===
- Dennis Botitis
- Gene Castle
- Ron Chisholm
- Tom Fowler
- Edward J. Heim (Don Gibson)
- Don Johanson
- Birl Jonns
- Doug Okerson

=== Nashville Pickers ===
- Lewis Phillips (6 year-old banjo player)
- Little Roy Lewis
- Grandpa Jones (Banjo)
- Ramona Jones (Banjo)
- Bashful Brother Oswald (Banjo)
- Mack Magaha (Fiddle)
- Lewis Brown

== Songs ==
=== Originals ===
By Ken and Mitzie Welch.

- "What Am I Doing Up Here?"
- "No One Picks Like a Nashville Picker" (/"Orange Blossom Special")
- "It's a Kick (Kicking Around With You)"
- "No One Kicks Like a Nashville Kicker"

=== Gospel Medley ===
- The Wayfaring Stranger - Dolly
- Swing Low, Sweet Chariot - Carol
- Amazing Grace - Dolly
- In the Sweet By and By - Dolly
- I'll Fly Away - Dolly
- Old Time Religion - Carol & Dolly
- This Little Light of Mine - Carol & Dolly

=== Girlfriends Sketch ===
- Turn Around (Where Are You Going, My Little One?) - Carol & Dolly
- San Antonio Rose - Pee Wee King and the Golden West Cowboys
- Cold, Cold Heart - Hank Williams
- Hey, Good Lookin' - Hank Williams (also Carol)
- Oh, Lonesome Me - Don Gibson

=== Heart Medley ===
- My Funny Valentine
- (You Gotta Have) Heart
- Heart of My Heart
- Dear Hearts and Gentle People
- Deep in the Heart of Texas
- My Heart Belongs to Daddy
- My Heart Stood Still - Dolly
- Don't Sweetheart Me - Carol
- Good Hearted Woman - Dolly
- Stout-hearted Men
- Be Careful, It's My Heart - Carol
- Heart and Soul - Dolly
- My Foolish Heart - Carol
- Heartaches by the Number - Dolly
- More Than You Know - Carol
- Your Cheatin' Heart
- My Heart Cries for You
- Baby Won't You Please Come Home - Carol
- Heartbreak Hotel - Dolly
- St. Louis Blues - Carol
- How Can You Mend a Broken Heart?
- There's a Broken Heart for Every Light on Broadway - Carol
- It's a Heartache - Dolly & Carol
- Good Morning Heartache - Carol
- Heartbreaker - Dolly
- Put a Little Love in Your Heart
- A Cockeyed Optimist - Carol
- My Funny Valentine (finale)
