= I Really Got the Feeling =

1978 song by Dolly Parton

Single by Dolly Parton

from the album Heartbreaker
- A-side: "Baby I'm Burnin'"
- Released: November 6, 1978
- Recorded: March 7, 1978
- Studio: Sound Labs (Los Angeles)
- Genre: Country pop
- Length: 3:09
- Label: RCA
- Songwriter: Billy Vera
- Producers: Gary Klein; Dolly Parton; Charles Koppelman (exec.)

Dolly Parton singles chronology
| "Baby I'm Burnin'" (1978) | "I Really Got the Feeling" (1978) | "You're the Only One" (1979) |

"I Really Got the Feeling" is a song by American singer-songwriter Dolly Parton. It was written by Billy Vera and produced by Gary Klein and Parton with Charles Koppelman serving as executive producer. The song was first released on Parton's twentieth solo studio album Heartbreaker in July 1978. It was released as a double A-side single with "Baby I'm Burnin'" on November 6, 1978 by RCA Records. "I Really Got the Feeling" was aimed at country radio while "Baby I'm Burnin'" was aimed at pop radio. "I Really Got the Feeling" peaked at number one on the Billboard Hot Country Songs chart, Parton's tenth song to top the chart.

== Critical reception ==
Cashbox reviewed the single in the November 18, 1978 issue and compared "I Really Got the Feeling" to Parton's previous single release "Heartbreaker" and concluded by saying that it "should receive much airplay."

== Commercial performance ==
The single debuted on the Billboard Hot Country Songs chart dated November 25, 1978 at number 48, credited as "Baby I'm Burnin'" / "I Really Got the Feeling". For the remainder of its chart run it was credited as "I Really Got the Feeling" / "Baby I'm Burnin'". It peaked at number one on the chart dated January 20, 1979, its ninth week on the chart. It charted for a total of 14 weeks. The song also made an appearances on the Billboard Hot 100 and the Billboard Adult Contemporary chart as the flip side of "Baby I'm Burnin'".

== Charts ==
=== Weekly charts ===
| Chart (1978–1979) | Peak position |
|---|---|
| US Hot Country Songs (Billboard) | 1 |

=== Year-end charts ===
| Chart (1979) | Rank |
|---|---|
| US Hot Country Songs (Billboard) | 32 |

== Other versions ==
B.J. Thomas covered "I Really Got the Feeling" on his 1982 LP, As We Know Him. It was used as the B-side of his single release, "But Love Me" (US AC #27).
