= Heartbreaker (Dolly Parton album) =

Studio album by Dolly Parton
- Released: July 17, 1978
- Recorded: March 7–10, 1978
- Studios: Sound Lab, Los Angeles
- Genres: Country; pop; disco
- Length: 32:02
- Label: RCA Victor
- Producers: Gary Klein; Dolly Parton; Charles Koppelman (exec.)

Dolly Parton chronology
Here You Come Again (1977)	Heartbreaker (1978)	Great Balls of Fire (1979)

Singles from Heartbreaker
- 1. "Heartbreaker" Released: July 24, 1978; 2. "It's Too Late to Love Me Now" Released: 1978; 3. "Baby I'm Burnin'" Released: November 6, 1978; 4. "I Really Got the Feeling" Released: November 6, 1978

Heartbreaker is the twentieth solo studio album by American singer-songwriter Dolly Parton. It was released on July 17, 1978, by RCA Victor. The album was produced by Gary Klein and Parton with Charles Koppelman serving as executive producer, and was an even more direct aim at the pop charts, with several of its songs verging on disco. The album topped the Billboard Top Country Albums chart for nine consecutive weeks and peaked at number 27 on the Billboard 200. The album produced two number one hits on the Billboard Hot Country Songs chart, "Heartbreaker" and "I Really Got the Feeling", while "Baby I'm Burnin'" peaked at number 25 on the Billboard Hot 100. The album has been certified Gold in the United States and Canada.

== Content ==
Following the success of 1977's Here You Come Again, Parton again teamed up with producer Gary Klein for her follow-up album. The album furthers her transition into pop music and features disco influences as well.

The album cover, a gatefold design depicting Parton in a series of surreal, dream-like images, was designed by graphic artist Ed Caraeff, who had also designed the cover art for Here You Come Again.

== Recording ==
The album was recorded from March 7–10, 1978, at Sound Labs in Los Angeles, California.

== Release and promotion ==
The album was released July 17, 1978 on LP, 8-track, and cassette.

=== Singles ===
"Heartbreaker" was released as the first single from the album in July 1978. It peaked at number one on the Billboard Hot Country Songs chart, number 12 on the Billboard Adult Contemporary chart, and number 37 on the Billboard Hot 100. In Canada, the song peaked at number one on both the Country Singles Chart and the Adult Contemporary Chart. The single also peaked at number 41 in Australia.

"It's Too Late to Love Me Now" was released as a single in late 1978 in South Africa. The release did not chart.

"Baby I'm Burnin'" and "I Really Got the Feeling" were released as a double A-side single in November 1978. "Baby I'm Burnin'" was aimed at pop radio and peaked at number 25 on the Billboard Hot 100, number 11 on the Billboard Adult Contemporary chart, and number 48 on the Billboard Hot Country Songs chart. The song also saw success in Canada, peaking at number 30 on the Singles Chart, number nine on the Adult Contemporary Chart, and number one on the Country Singles Chart. The single was also a top 40 hit in Australia, peaking number 34. A 12-inch disco remix single was issued titled Dance with Dolly featuring remixes of "Baby I'm Burnin'" and "I Wanna Fall in Love". "Baby I'm Burnin'" peaked at number 15 on the Billboard Dance Club Songs chart. "I Really Got the Feeling" was aimed at country radio and peaked at number one on the Billboard Hot Country Songs chart.

=== Additional promotion ===
For Valentine's Day 1979, Parton saturated the media. She co-headlined the CBS TV special Dolly & Carol in Nashville alongside Carol Burnett, and RCA Records provided over 3,000 radio stations with copies of the album and boxes of candies for giveaways. Only a snippet of the title song was performed on the special as part of a heart-themed medley. Participating radio stations designed their own promotions, which included call-in giveaways, drawings, a poetry contest, and one in which winners were assigned gender-specific prizes (candy for ladies, records for men).

== Critical reception ==
Professional ratings
Review scores
Source	Rating
AllMusic	4/5 stars
Christgau's Record Guide	C
The Encyclopedia of Popular Music	2/5 stars

The album received positive reviews from music critics. Billboard said that while "Parton continues to lean heavily towards the pop flavored song and delivery...there are subtle country textures and even one or two mainstream country songs." The review praised the album's upbeat songs and ballads as "executed in Parton's charming vocal manner." It went on to praise the album's material, calling Parton's own compositions "forceful", Gary Klein's production as "masterful," and the musicians "top notch." The review selected "I Really Got the Feeling", "Baby I'm Burnin'", "Heartbreaker", "We're Through Forever ('Til Tomorrow)", and "Nickels and Dimes" as the best cuts on the album.

Cashbox also gave a positive review of the album. The review said the album "borders on perfection." While noting Parton's "deep roots sunk back in the hollows of East Tennessee," the review pointed out that "she is fast leaving country music." It went on to say that there isn't anything wrong with this, Parton is simply growing as an artist. The review closed by saying that "at this point, Dolly has to be considered a superstar in the largest sense." The Globe and Mail concluded that "country music lovers may flinch at the disco rhythm tracks, but Dolly Parton's shift from country to pop is a change in approach, not substance."

Zac Johnson of AllMusic felt that the album "showcases [Parton's] increasing confidence beautifully."

== Commercial performance ==
The album debuted at number 46 on the Billboard Top Country Albums chart dated August 12, 1978. It peaked at number one on the chart dated September 9 where it remained for nine consecutive weeks. The album charted for a total of 45 weeks. It peaked at number 27 on the Billboard 200 chart dated October 7. The album also topped the RPM Country Albums chart in Canada as well as peaking at number 20 on the RPM Top Albums chart. It also charted in Australia where it peaked at number 67.

The album was certified Gold by the Recording Industry Association of America on August 16, 1978 for shipment of 500,000 copies.

It was certified Gold on December 1, 1978 by Music Canada for shipment of 50,000 copies.

The album came in at number four on the Billboard Top Country Albums year-end chart in 1978 and number 10 on the 1979 chart.

== Reissues ==
The album was reissued on CD by Buddha Records in 1999 and 2002. It was released as a digital download on August 12, 2008.

== Track listing ==
All tracks are written by Dolly Parton, except where noted.

Side one
No.	Title	Writer(s)	Recording date	Length
1.	"I Really Got the Feeling"	Billy Vera	March 7, 1978	3:09
2.	"It's Too Late to Love Me Now"	Rory Bourke; Gene Dobbins; Johnny Wilson	March 9, 1978	3:02
3.	"We're Through Forever ('Til Tomorrow)" (with Richard Dennison)	Blaise Tosti	March 8, 1978	3:51
4.	"Sure Thing"		March 9, 1978	3:33
5.	"With You Gone"		March 10, 1978	3:07

Side two
No.	Title	Writer(s)	Recording date	Length
1.	"Baby I'm Burnin'"		March 8, 1978	2:37
2.	"Nickels and Dimes"	Dolly Parton; Floyd Parton	March 7, 1978	3:24
3.	"The Man"		March 10, 1978	3:16
4.	"Heartbreaker"	Carole Bayer Sager; David Wolfert	March 7, 1978	3:35
5.	"I Wanna Fall in Love"		March 8, 1978	2:26

== Personnel ==
Adapted from the album liner notes.

Performance

- Anita Ball – backing vocals
- Jeff Baxter – guitar synthesizer
- Paulinho Da Costa – congas
- Nick DeCaro – arrangements
- Richard Dennison – backing vocals, duet vocals (track A3)
- David Foster – piano
- Jimmy Gilstrap – backing vocals
- Jerry Hey – trumpet
- David Hungate – bass
- Kim Hutchcroft – soprano, tenor and baritone saxophone
- Augie Johnson – backing vocals
- Jim Keltner – drums, special effects
- Steve Madaio – trumpet
- Myrna Matthews – backing vocals
- Joe McGuffee – steel guitar
- Michael Omartian – piano
- David Paich – piano
- Dean Parks – acoustic guitar, electric guitar
- Dolly Parton – lead vocals
- Al Perkins – pedal steel guitar
- Gregg Perry – piano
- Mac Rebennack – piano
- Bill Reichenbach – trombone
- Stephanie Spruill – backing vocals
- Larry Williams – tenor saxophone, flute
- Angela Winbush – backing vocals
- David Wolfert – acoustic guitar, electric guitar

Production

- Nancy Atkins – production coordinator
- Harry Bluestone – concert master
- Frank DeCaro – album coordinator, music contractor
- Nick DeCaro – string arrangements (tracks A1, A3, B3, B4)
- Linda Gerrity – production coordinator
- Jimmy Gilstrap – vocal coaching
- Don Henderson – assistant engineer
- Jerry Hey – horn arrangements (tracks A4, A5, B1, B2, B5)
- Charles Koppelman – executive producer
- Gary Klein – producer
- Dolly Parton – producer, rhythm arrangements (tracks A5, B3), vocal coaching
- Gregg Perry – rhythm arrangements (tracks A3, B1, B5), string arrangements (track A2), vocal coaching
- Armin Steiner – engineer, mixing
- Linda Tyler – assistant engineer
- David Wolfert – rhythm arrangements (tracks A1, A2 B2, B4)
- Larry Williams – horn arrangements (tracks A4, A5, B1, B2, B5)

Other personnel

- Ed Caraeff – art direction, photography, album design

== Charts ==
=== Weekly charts ===
Chart (1978)	Peak position
Australia (Kent Music Report)	67
US Top Country Albums (Billboard)	1
US Billboard 200	27
Canada Country Albums (RPM)	1
Canada Top Albums/CDs (RPM)	20
US Cashbox Country Albums	1
US Cash Box Top Albums	36

=== Year-end charts ===
Chart (1978)	Peak position
US Top Country Albums (Billboard)	4

Chart (1979)	Peak position
US Top Country Albums (Billboard)	10

== Certifications ==
Region	Certification	Certified units/sales
Canada (Music Canada)	Gold	50,000^{^}
United States (RIAA)	Gold	500,000^{^}
^{^} Shipments figures based on certification alone.
