= Zella Lehr =

American singer and entertainer (born 1951)

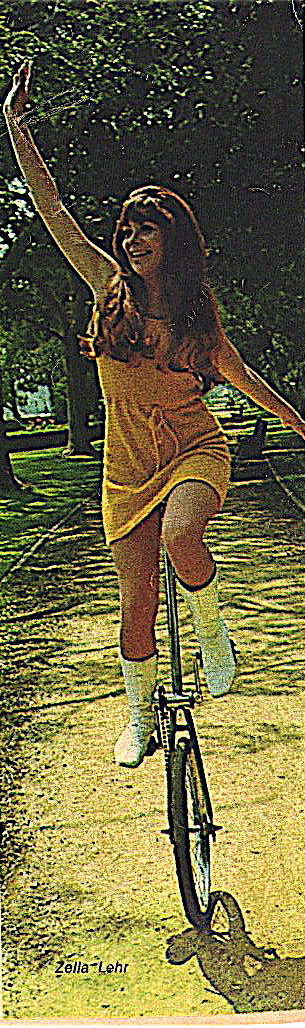
- Lehr as The Unicycle Girl on Hee Haw

Background information
- Born: March 14, 1951 (age 74)
- Origin: Burbank, California, U.S.
- Genres: Country
- Occupation: Singer
- Instrument: Vocals
- Years active: 1978–1985
- Labels: RCA; Columbia; Compleat

Zella Lehr (born March 14, 1951) is an American singer and entertainer. She had hit records on RCA Records and Columbia Records, most notably her cover of Dolly Parton's "Two Doors Down (which charted for Lehr in late 1977, before Parton herself had released the song as a single). She had been on the Billboard Hot Country Singles chart for 18 weeks and in 1980 was nominated by the Academy of Country Music and Cashbox Magazine for the 'Most Promising Female Vocalist' award.

Zella has spent her life on stage, making her debut at the age of seven along with her parents and two brothers performing as 'The Lehr Family'. She made guest appearances on the Merv Griffin Show and The Tonight Show Starring Johnny Carson before becoming a regular on the CBS television show Hee Haw as the 'unicycle girl'. A TV Guide article of her exploits led to her first Las Vegas showroom engagement, which in turn resulted in appearances with Wayne Newton, Sammy Davis Jr., Glen Campbell, and the Statler Brothers. After relocating to Reno, Nevada she was named Northern Nevada's Entertainer of the Year for seven years in a row. Lehr went on to own and operate Zella Lehr's Dinner Theater from 2000–2004, and now has an entertainment production company and talent agency.

== Discography ==
Title	Album details
Feedin' the Fire	Release date: 1981; Label: Columbia Records

=== Singles ===
Year	Single	Peak positions		Album
Year	Single	US Country	CAN Country	Album
1974	"Dirty Mary, Crazy Larry"	—	—	—
1975	"I Can't Help Myself"	—	—	—
1975	"Just Believe in Me"	—	—	—
1977	"After You've Had Me"	—	—	—
1977	"Two Doors Down"	7	5	—
1978	"When the Fire Gets Hot"	31	21	—
1978	"Danger, Heartbreak Ahead"	20	16	—
1979	"Play Me a Memory"	24	—	—
1979	"Only Diamonds Are Forever"	59	—	—
1979	"Once in a Blue Moon"	34	—	—
1979	"Love Has Taken Its Time"	26	—	—
1980	"Rodeo Eyes"	25	—	—
1980	"Love Crazy Love"	34	—	—
1981	"Feedin' the Fire"	16	—	Feedin' the Fire
1982	"Blue Eyes Don't Make an Angel"	56	—	Feedin' the Fire
1982	"He's a Gypsy"	—	—	Feedin' the Fire
1982	"What a Way to Spend the Night"	85	—	—
1983	"Haven't We Loved Somewhere Before"	86	—	—
1984	"All Heaven Is About to Break Loose"	72	—	—
1985	"You Bring Out the Lover in Me"	66	—	—
"—" denotes releases that did not chart.
