= Straight Talk =

1992 film by Barnet Kellman

- Theatrical release poster
- Directed by: Barnet Kellman
- Screenplay by: Craig Bolotin; Patricia Resnick
- Story by: Craig Bolotin
- Produced by: Robert Chartoff; Fred Berner
- Starring: Dolly Parton; James Woods; Griffin Dunne; Michael Madsen
- Cinematography: Peter Sova
- Edited by: Michael Tronick
- Music by: Dolly Parton; Brad Fiedel
- Production company: Hollywood Pictures
- Distributed by: Buena Vista Pictures Distribution
- Release date: April 3, 1992
- Running time: 91 minutes
- Country: United States
- Language: English
- Box office: $21 million (US and Canada)

Straight Talk is a 1992 American romantic comedy film directed by Barnet Kellman, and starring Dolly Parton, James Woods, Griffin Dunne, and Michael Madsen. The film follows a woman who leaves her small-town life to move to Chicago, where she accidentally becomes a successful radio talk show host.

== Plot ==
Shirlee Kenyon, a dance instructor in the small town of Flat River, Arkansas, is fired for giving advice to her clients rather than teaching them dance. She attempts to convince her unemployed boyfriend Steve to move to Chicago with her. After he belittles her, she moves there without him.

Once she arrives, Shirlee stands on the Wabash Avenue Bridge to make a wish when she accidentally drops two $20 bills. As she climbs over the rail to retrieve one, Jack Russell, an investigative journalist, sees her through his office window and, assuming she is attempting suicide, runs out to rescue Shirlee. As he attempts to pull her to safety, she almost falls into the river and ends up losing the money. Upon learning that she was merely trying to retrieve a $20 bill, Jack offers her money, which she refuses and leaves.

Shirlee stops at a diner for breakfast, and chats with another customer, Janice, who is annoyed that she was stood up again by her workaholic boyfriend the previous evening. Shirlee tells her he is taking her for granted, and advises her to end the relationship and move on with her life. Shortly afterwards, Jack arrives at the diner and is revealed to be the very boyfriend Janice is bemoaning. Taking Shirlee's advice, Janice breaks up with Jack. Jack sardonically thanks Shirlee for ruining his day, then leaves.

After several unsuccessful job interviews, Shirlee is given a chance as a receptionist at a local radio station, despite her lack of experience. On her first day, she inadvertently walks into a studio and is mistaken for the station's new call-in therapist, Dr. Kendall. Despite insisting that her last name is Kenyon, Shirlee is put on the air and begins hesitantly talking with the show's callers, giving straightforward advice and often instructing listeners to "honk their own horn". While listening to the show, program director Alan Riegert is appalled and quickly fires Shirlee.

However, Shirlee's radio segment proves to be a hit with the audience, and Alan offers Shirlee an $800-per-week contract to host her own show. She signs the contract, but Alan tells her that she must pretend to be a real clinical doctor. She reluctantly accepts and becomes a hugely popular radio figure as "Dr. Shirlee".

Jack grows suspicious when he realizes the woman who was willing to risk her life for $20 is a successful doctor. Despite his editor's reluctance, Jack sets out to write a story exposing Shirlee. As he investigates her, he begins dating her and soon falls in love with her. Eventually, Jack visits Flat River to ask Steve questions about Shirlee.

When Shirlee takes Jack to her new apartment, they are interrupted by the sudden arrival of Steve, who has learned of her success. Failing to recognize Jack, Steve punches him before Shirlee orders Steve to leave. Afterwards, Shirlee and Jack have sex. The next morning, Jack refuses to publish his story about Shirlee and quits his job. However, Shirlee learns from Steve, who remembers having met Jack in Flat River, that Jack is a reporter. Confronted by Shirlee, Jack admits he was initially writing a story about her, but he eventually developed true feelings for her. Upset, she storms off and refuses to take his calls.

As Shirlee's popularity increases, a mishap involving advice about leaving an alcoholic partner eventually causes her to confess on air that she is not an actual doctor. Shortly after she quits the show, her fans call in, suggesting that listeners honk their horns at midnight to express their support for Shirlee. Jack finds Shirlee on the Wabash Avenue Bridge and convinces her that she did help her listeners. As they hear the horns, Jack tells Shirlee that they are for her, and they kiss. When nearby police officers recognize "Dr. Shirlee", she declares that she is now just Shirlee.

== Cast ==
- Dolly Parton as Shirlee Kenyon
- James Woods as Jack Russell
- Griffin Dunne as Alan Riegert
- Philip Bosco as Gene Perlman
- Jerry Orbach as Milo Jacoby
- Michael Madsen as Steve
- Teri Hatcher as Janice
- Jay Thomas as "Zim" Zimmerman
- Spalding Gray as Dr. David Erdman
- John Sayles as Guy Girardi
- Deirdre O'Connell as Lily
- Charles Fleischer as Tony
- Keith MacKechnie as Gordon
- Amy Morton as Ann
- Paula Newsome as Ellen
- Paul Dinello as Casey
- John Gegenhuber as a waiter
- Tracy Letts as Sean
- Irma P. Hall as Ethel

== Production ==
In March 1991, it was announced that Dolly Parton would star in the film. Principal photography began on July 29, 1991, in Chicago, Illinois. The vast majority of the film was shot in historic downtown Lemont, Illinois, including the "Flank Center" building, and Stephen Street Bridge.

Most filming occurred in the early hours of the morning with the usage of high-intensity floodlights to depict daytime. This was done to reduce interference with the general public who crowded the streets throughout the weeks of filming. The bar in the raining scene, Tom's Place, is still open. The dance sequence between Parton and James Woods was mostly improvised, which fostered a natural rapport infused with spontaneous energy.

== Soundtrack ==
Parton composed ten original songs for the film soundtrack, including a re-recording of her 1976 song "Light of a Clear Blue Morning".

== Release ==
=== Home media ===
The film was released on VHS and laserdisc shortly after its theatrical release by Hollywood Pictures Home Video. A DVD release came from Hollywood Pictures Home Video in 2003. In 2011, Mill Creek Entertainment acquired the home video rights to the film, along with many others from Hollywood and Touchstone Pictures and released the film on DVD and Blu-ray. Mill Creek's DVD of the film is available by itself, as part of a double-feature set with Big Business, and a triple feature set with Big Business and V.I. Warshawski. On April 17, 2018, the film was re-released on Blu-ray through Kino Lorber.

== Reception ==
=== Box office ===
Straight Talk opened at the American box office at No. 4, grossing $4,575,746. The movie went on to earn a total gross of $21,202,099. The film was released in the United Kingdom on June 12, 1992, and opened at No. 1.

=== Critical response ===
The film received mixed reviews from critics, with much of the praise going to Parton and Woods' performances, while at the same time criticizing the story itself. The film holds a score of 42% on Rotten Tomatoes based on 12 reviews,

Roger Ebert of the Chicago Sun-Times gave the film two stars out of four, praising the charismatic performance of Parton's delivery of blunt, earthy advice during radio segments but criticized the script's conventional structure for its descent into an unconvincing, sappy romance that underutilized supporting actors like James Woods. Vincent Canby of The New York Times praised Parton's irresistible presence and her onscreen charisma, which he said carried the film's much lighter radio call-in scenes, but noted that the film relied too much on her appeal to offset its formulaic plot and its uneven romantic tone. In a 2023 retrospective review, Kristin Battestella of InSession Film praised the film's enjoyable urban scenery and on-air confessions as the film's enduring elements, even as the make-ups and the finale felt uneven.

Retrospective reviews noted a particularly element of the film's exploration of diverse themes, which is notable in a scene where Shirlee offers some compassionate guidance to a transgender caller grappling with an identity, showcasing the progressive approach to more sensitive topics in the years before its broader mainstream acceptance.
