= Jolene =

1973 single by Dolly Parton

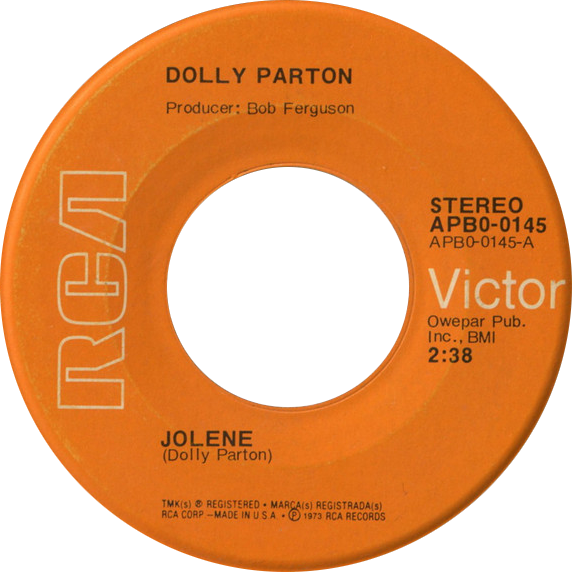
- Side A of US single

Single by Dolly Parton

from the album Jolene
- B-side: "Love, You're So Beautiful Tonight"
- Released: October 1973
- Recorded: May 22, 1973
- Studio: RCA Studio B, Nashville
- Genre: Country
- Length: 2:42
- Label: RCA Victor
- Songwriter: Dolly Parton
- Producer: Bob Ferguson

Dolly Parton singles chronology
"Traveling Man" (1973)	"Jolene" (1973)	"I Will Always Love You" (1974)

Music video
- "Jolene" (audio) on YouTube

"Jolene" is a song by American country singer Dolly Parton from her 1974 album of the same name. The lead single from the album, it was written and recorded by Parton and produced by Bob Ferguson. The lyrics are written from Parton's perspective, who begs a beautiful red-haired, green-eyed girl not to steal away her husband.

Considered by music critics to be one of the most representative songs of the country genre, the song was ranked number 217 on Rolling Stone magazine's list of the "500 Greatest Songs of All Time" in 2004 and number 63 on the revised version of the list in 2021. The song was nominated at the Grammy Awards for Best Female Country Vocal Performance twice, in 1975 and again in 1976 for its live recording.

The song was covered in English and Spanish by many artists, including Olivia Newton-John, the White Stripes, Miley Cyrus, Måneskin and Leila Forouhar (1977). A 2016 version by Pentatonix won the Grammy Award for Best Country Duo/Group Performance. In 2024, Beyoncé covered the song with significant changes in lyrics and production; her version reached the top ten of the US Billboard Hot 100 and the UK Official Singles Chart.

Following Parton's death, the song re-entered the music charts. "Jolene"—along with 26 others—broke the record previously held by Nicki Minaj for the most simultaneous tracks in the top 30 on U.S. iTunes.

== Background ==
Onstage in 1988, Parton told the audience that "Jolene" was based on a true story, which was why she did not like to sing it too often. A red-headed bank clerk used to flirt with her husband, Carl Dean, at his local bank branch when they were newly married, she has said. In an interview, she also revealed that Jolene's name and appearance (red hair, green eyes, and fair skin) are based on those of a young fan who came on stage for her autograph. This fan may have been Juline Whelan, a Canadian who met and got an autograph from Parton at age 10 in 1972; her appearance was as described, and her first name has often been confused with Jolene. Parton sang "Jolene, Jolene, Jolene, Jolene" to remember the name, which is how it became the chorus.

The guitar parts on the recording were performed by Chip Young and Wayne Moss. Young played the primary thumb-picked part, with Moss playing the complementary steel-string part that enters on the second refrain. Young got the fingerpicking pattern from a similar pattern played by Joe South.

During an interview on The Bobby Bones Show in 2018, Dolly Parton revealed that she wrote "Jolene" on the same day that she wrote "I Will Always Love You". Parton said in a later interview the songs were written "pretty close at the same time" but not necessarily on the same day.

== Content ==
The song tells of the narrator confronting Jolene, a stunningly beautiful woman, who she worries will steal away her lover or husband. Throughout the song, the narrator implores Jolene, "Please don't take him just because you can." The lyrics state the narrator's partner is fixated on Jolene and speaks her name in his sleep, but it is unclear if Jolene actually intends to steal the narrator's lover, an ambiguity that has been addressed in several answer songs, usually sung from Jolene's point of view.

In 2019, the podcast Dolly Parton's America had an episode addressing the question of whether the narrator's focus on Jolene's beauty and desirability is indicative of her own attraction to Jolene. A musicologist wrote and performed a fourth verse, which makes this interpretation explicit; when the podcast's hosts played audio of this performance for Parton, she responded that this was "another take on it".

== Commercial performance ==
The song became Parton's second solo number-one single on the country charts after being released as a single in January 1974 (prior to the album's release). It reached the top position in February 1974; it was also her first appearance on the Billboard Hot 100, where it entered the top 60, and a minor adult contemporary chart entry. As of December 2019, the song had sold 935,000 digital copies in the US since it became available for digital download.

The song was released as a single later in the UK, and became Parton's first charting song in the country, reaching number seven in the UK Singles Chart in 1976. The song also re-entered the chart when Parton performed at the Glastonbury festival in 2014. The song had sold 255,300 digital copies in the UK as of January 2017. According to the Official Charts Company, it is Parton's third most-streamed track in the UK with over 209.4 million streams. Interest in the song renewed after Parton's death in 2026, with streams on Spotify increasing by 630 percent worldwide. "Jolene" reached number 9 on the UK singles chart in the following week, along with other songs in Parton's library that recharted. The following week, it climbed to number 6, reaching a new peak. As of August 2026, "Jolene" has amassed 2,127,139 total units in the United Kingdom since 1994. The song reached 1 billion streams on Spotify, making her first track and the first song from the 1970s to achieved it.

== Legacy ==
The song is considered by music critics to be one of the most expressive songs in the country genre. In 2014, Rolling Stone ranked the song number nine on their 2014 list "100 Greatest Country Songs of All Time". The song was also ranked number 217 on Rolling Stone's list of the "500 Greatest Songs of All Time" in 2004, and number 63 on their revised list in 2021. In a 2024 update, Rolling Stone expanded their ranking to the 200 Greatest Country Songs of All Time, this time placing "Jolene" at number one. Genius placed the song 38th on their list of the "100 Best Country Songs of All Time Lyrics". Time includes the song on their 2011 list of the "ALL-TIME 100 Best Songs".

Time Out ranked the song at second place on their list of the "35 best country songs of all time". Parade placed the song second on their list of the "101 Best Country Songs of All Time". The Tennessean includes the song on their 2019 list of the "100 best country songs of all time", writing that it "crosses genre and generations, a once-in-a-world song without boundaries". NME includes the song on their 2018 list of "The 25 Best Country Music Songs of All Time". In June 2026, CBS News included the song in its list of the 250 essential American songs of the past 250 years.

In the film The Intervention (Clea Duvall; 2016), Annie (Melanie Lynskey) tells Lola (Alia Shawkat), "Nobody likes a Jolene", after the younger woman stirs up trouble among a group of older couples by making a play for several individuals among them. The song is the basis of Catherynne M. Valente's 2025 short story "When He Calls Your Name", in which Jolene is a vampire.

The song's international popularity became apparent during the COVID-19 pandemic, when the New Zealand government put the country in lockdown. A newspaper summary of "essential things to know" explained that washing one's hands with soap should take "as long as it takes to sing the 'Happy Birthday' song twice or the chorus of Dolly Parton's hit song 'Jolene.'" According to Parton, "Jolene" is her most frequently covered song. Parton sang "Jolene" at her 2022 induction into the Rock and Roll Hall of Fame.

== Awards ==
"Jolene" was nominated for the Grammy Awards for Best Female Country Vocal Performance twice, in 1975 and 1976. The first nomination was for the original recording, and the second was for a live recording from the TV series In Concert. It did not win either time, but in 2017, a cover by the a cappella group Pentatonix won the Grammy Award for Best Country Duo/Group Performance; this version featured Parton as a guest singer.

== Charts ==
=== Weekly charts ===
Chart (1973–1974)	Peak position
Australia (Kent Music Report)	99
Canada Top Singles (RPM)	84
Canada Adult Contemporary Songs (RPM)	40
Canada Country Singles (RPM)	1
Denmark (Tracklisten)	19
New Zealand (Listener)	6
South Africa (Springbok Radio)	3
Sweden (Sverigetopplistan)	16
US Billboard Hot 100	60
US Cash Box Top 100	80
US Adult Contemporary (Billboard)	44
US Country Songs (Billboard)	1

Chart (1976)	Peak position
Ireland (IRMA)	8
UK Singles (Official Charts)	7

Chart (2026)	Peak position
Australia On Replay (ARIA)	2
Austria (Ö3 Austria Top 40)	29
Canada Hot 100 (Billboard)	20
Denmark (Tracklisten)	12
Finland (Suomen virallinen lista)	49
France (SNEP)	81
Germany (GfK)	76
Global 200 (Billboard)	16
Greece International (IFPI)	38
Iceland (Billboard)	23
Ireland (IRMA)	7
Israel International Airplay (Media Forest)	3
Netherlands (Dutch Top 40)	25
Netherlands (Single Top 100)	23
New Zealand (Recorded Music NZ)	6
Nigeria Airplay (TurnTable)	80
Norway (IFPI Norge)	11
South Africa Airplay (TOSAC)	9
Sweden (Sverigetopplistan)	4
Switzerland (Schweizer Hitparade)	7
UK Singles (Official Charts)	6
US Billboard Hot 100	16

=== Year-end charts ===
Chart (1974)	Position
US Hot Country Songs (Billboard)	6

== Certifications and sales ==
Region	Certification	Certified units/sales
Australia (ARIA)	7× Platinum	490,000^{‡}
Austria (IFPI Austria)	Platinum	100,000^{*}
Denmark (IFPI Danmark)	Platinum	90,000^{‡}
Germany (BVMI)	Gold	300,000^{‡}
Mexico (AMPROFON)	Gold	30,000^{‡}
New Zealand (RMNZ)	5× Platinum	150,000^{‡}
Norway (IFPI Norway)	3× Platinum	180,000^{‡}
Spain (Promusicae)	Gold	30,000^{‡}
United Kingdom (BPI)	3× Platinum	2,127,139
United States (RIAA)	3× Platinum	3,000,000^{‡}
Streaming
Greece (IFPI Greece)	Platinum	2,000,000^{†}
Sweden (GLF)	3× Platinum	24,000,000^{†}
^{*} Sales figures based on certification alone.^{‡} Sales+streaming figures based on certification alone.^{†} Streaming-only figures based on certification alone.

== Olivia Newton-John version ==
"Jolene"

Single by Olivia Newton-John

from the album Come On Over
- Released: 1976
- Genre: Country
- Length: 3:07
- Label: EMI
- Songwriter: Dolly Parton
- Producer: John Farrar

Olivia Newton-John singles chronology
"Come On Over" (1976)	"Jolene" (1976)	"Don't Stop Believin'" (1976)

In 1976, Olivia Newton-John recorded a version and released it as the second and final single from her seventh studio album, Come On Over, in selected countries. In Japan, the song peaked at number 11 on the Oricon Singles Chart.

The single was released in Australia in early 1978, peaking at number 29.

The song was a part of the 1982, 40-city Physical Tour set list, then became a popular concert event on HBO in 1983.

In 2022, the song was included on the reissue of Olivia Newton-John's Greatest Hits, her first greatest hits album.

During the COVID-19 pandemic, Newton-John created an in-studio duet with Parton, with the performance captured on video. The duet was released as part of Newton-John's first posthumous album, Just the Two of Us: The Duets Collection (Vol. 1).

=== Track listing ===
1. "Jolene" – 3:03
2. "Wrap Me in Your Arms" – 3:03

=== Charts ===
==== Weekly charts ====
Chart (1976–1978)	Peak position
Australia (Kent Music Report)	29

==== Year-end charts ====
Chart (1978)	Position
Australia (Kent Music Report)	99

== The White Stripes version ==
"Jolene (Live Under Blackpool Lights)"

Single by the White Stripes

from the album Under Blackpool Lights
- Released: November 15, 2004
- Recorded: January 2004
- Venue: Empress Ballroom (England)
- Length: 3:18
- Label: XL
- Songwriter: Dolly Parton
- Producer: Jack White

The White Stripes singles chronology
"There's No Home for You Here" (2004)	"Jolene (Live Under Blackpool Lights)" (2004)	"Blue Orchid" (2005)

Music video
- "Jolene" on YouTube

"Jolene (Live Under Blackpool Lights)" was released as a live single by American garage rock band the White Stripes on November 15, 2004. A studio version was previously released as the B-side to "Hello Operator", a single from their 2000 album De Stijl. Another live performance of the song is featured on the 2010 live album Under Great White Northern Lights.

The single reached No. 16 on the UK Singles Chart, No. 12 in Norway, and No. 28 in Flanders. In Australia was ranked No. 10 on Triple J's Hottest 100 of 2004. In 2013, it was voted one of the greatest live covers by readers of Rolling Stone magazine. In 2024, it was ranked the second best cover of the song by Billboard.

=== Track listing ===
1. "Jolene (Live Under Blackpool Lights)"
2. "Black Math (Live Under Blackpool Lights)" (only on CD version)
3. "Do (Live Under Blackpool Lights)" (only on vinyl flip side)

=== Charts ===
Chart (2004–2005)	Peak position
Belgium (Ultratop 50 Flanders)	28
Belgium (Ultratip Bubbling Under Wallonia)	12
Ireland (IRMA)	42
Norway (VG-lista)	12
Scottish Singles Sales (Official Charts)	16
Sweden (Sverigetopplistan)	55
UK Singles (Official Charts)	16
UK Independent (Official Charts)	1

== Pentatonix version ==
"Jolene"

Single by Pentatonix featuring Dolly Parton

from the album PTX, Vol. IV - Classics
- Released: September 16, 2016
- Genre: A cappella
- Length: 2:11
- Label: RCA
- Songwriter: Dolly Parton
- Producer: Ben Bram

Pentatonix singles chronology
"If I Ain't Got You" (2016)	"Jolene" (2016)	"Hallelujah" (2016)

Dolly Parton singles chronology
"Forever Country" (2016)	"Jolene" (2016)	"Head Over High Heels" (2016)

In September 2016, the American a cappella group Pentatonix released a cover of the song with Dolly Parton herself as feature artist. The cover won the Grammy Award for Best Country Duo/Group Performance.

=== Charts ===
Chart (2016)	Peak position
Australia (ARIA)	92
Canada Hot 100 (Billboard)	84
New Zealand Heatseekers (Recorded Music NZ)	5
Scottish Singles Sales (Official Charts)	93
US Bubbling Under Hot 100 (Billboard)	1
US Hot Country Songs (Billboard)	18

== Beyoncé version ==
"Jolene"

Song by Beyoncé

from the album Cowboy Carter
- Released: March 29, 2024
- Studio: Kings Landing West (Los Angeles, CA); Parkwood West (Los Angeles, CA); The Trailer (East Hampton, NY); Westlake (Hollywood, CA)
- Genre: Country pop; R&B
- Length: 3:09
- Label: Parkwood; Columbia
- Songwriter: Dolly Parton
- Producers: Beyoncé; Khirye Tyler; Jack Rochon; Nova Wav; Alex Vickery

Lyric video
- "Jolene" on YouTube

American singer Beyoncé recorded a cover of "Jolene", with significant lyrical changes, and included it on her eighth studio album Cowboy Carter, released on March 29, 2024.

At the 2024 People's Choice Country Awards the cover was nominated for The Cover Song of the Year.

=== Background and release ===
On March 11, 2024, ahead of the release of Cowboy Carter, Dolly Parton revealed in an interview with Knox News that Beyoncé asked to record a cover of the song. After the song's release, Parton praised the cover, writing that "I just heard 'Jolene'. Beyoncé is giving that girl some trouble and she deserves it".

=== Lyrics and production changes ===
The cover of the song features changes in the lyrics and production of the song. Nevertheless, all songwriting credits were given to Parton. On Beyoncé's version, the bridge has additional melodies and includes a choir of voices backing up the singer. Lauren Boisvert of American Songwriter pointed out that although the melody is the same in both the songs, Parton's one is "twangy on the guitar" while Beyoncé's cover "employs a smoother guitar sound backed by a pulsing beat to tie the song into her pop/R&B roots".

Lyrically, the cover changes the significance attributed to the role of Jolene and the interlocutor who speaks to her. Critics pointed out that while in Parton's version the singer is begging Jolene not to take her man, Beyoncé is warning Jolene not to attempt the same in hers. Other critics referred to the re-written lyrics as addressing Jay-Z's infidelity. In the track preceding "Jolene" on the album, titled "Dolly P", Parton introduces the cover, saying "You know that hussy with the good hair you sing about? Reminded me of someone I knew back when. Except she has flaming locks of auburn hair. Bless her heart. Just a hair of a different color, but it hurts just the same." referring to a girl called "Becky with the good hair" on Beyoncé's Lemonade song "Sorry".

=== Commercial performance ===
In the United States the cover debuted at number 7 on the Billboard Hot 100, becoming the version of "Jolene" with the highest placement on the chart. It scored Beyoncé's 24th top-ten on the Hot 100 and Cowboy Carter's third top-ten, charting simultaneously with "Texas Hold 'Em" and "II Most Wanted". The three songs also occupied the top three positions on the Hot Country Songs, with "Jolene" at third, making Beyoncé the first female artist to achieve it.

In Australia the cover peaked at number 24 on the ARIA Singles Chart after its first week of sale, becoming the highest position reached by the song on the chart. "Jolene" debuted at number 8 on the UK Singles Chart on April 5, 2024, one of three songs from Cowboy Carter in the top ten that week.

=== Charts ===
==== Weekly charts ====
Weekly chart performance for "Jolene" by Beyoncé
Chart (2024)	Peak position
Australia (ARIA)	24
Belgium (Ultratop 50 Flanders)	49
Brazil Hot 100 (Billboard)	69
Canada Hot 100 (Billboard)	19
Croatia International Airplay (HRT)	23
Denmark (Tracklisten)	49
France (SNEP)	70
Global 200 (Billboard)	11
Greece (IFPI)	53
Iceland (Tónlistinn)	25
Ireland (IRMA)	11
Lithuania Airplay (TopHit)	49
Netherlands (Single Top 100)	26
New Zealand (Recorded Music NZ)	23
Norway (VG-lista)	34
Portugal (AFP)	30
Romania Airplay (TopHit)	138
Sweden (Sverigetopplistan)	33
Switzerland (Schweizer Hitparade)	21
UK Singles (Official Charts)	8
US Billboard Hot 100	7
US Country Airplay (Billboard)	56
US Hot Country Songs (Billboard)	3

==== Year-end charts ====
2024 year-end chart performance for "Jolene" by Beyoncé
Chart (2024)	Position
US Hot Country Songs (Billboard)	94

=== Certifications ===
Region	Certification	Certified units/sales
Brazil (Pro-Música Brasil)	Platinum	40,000^{‡}
Canada (Music Canada)	Gold	40,000^{‡}
^{‡} Sales+streaming figures based on certification alone.

== Other cover versions ==
- English rock band The Sisters Of Mercy started performing the song live in 1983. They also recorded a studio version of the song for BBC Radio in 1983. That version was eventually released in 2021 on the album BBC Sessions 1982-1984.
- Scottish new wave duo Strawberry Switchblade released their version in 1985 which peaked at No. 53 on the UK Singles Chart.
- The first cover in Spanish was released in 1986 by Dominican merengue band Las Chicas del Can, titled "Youlin" and sung by Miriam Cruz.
- New Zealand musician, Darcy Clay, covered "Jolene" in his debut EP Jesus I Was Evil, released in 1997.
- Hebrew version sang and written by Susie Miller, released in 1992 as promo single.
- Swedish band Spirella Girls released a parody version in 1994 named "Brolin, Brolin". The title refers to the soccer player Tomas Brolin and is about a soccer widow who asks Brolin to release his grip on her husband.
- Alternative rock band Queenadreena released a cover of "Jolene" as a double A-side with "Pretty Polly" in 2000, peaking at no. 100 on the UK Singles Chart.
- Rhonda Vincent included a version on her 2000 album Back Home Again.
- Sherrié Austin's version of "Jolene" is the second track on her 2001 album Followin' a Feelin'. It was released as a single, and peaked at #55 on the Billboard Hot Country Songs chart in April 2001.
- Kelly Chen covered "Jolene" for her 2001 studio album In The Party, with Cantonese lyrics by Yan Kin Keung.
- Mindy Smith covered "Jolene" in 2003, both for her debut album One Moment More and the Dolly Parton tribute album Just Because I'm a Woman. Parton described this cover as her favorite version of the song.
- Between the years of 2010–2019, Miley Cyrus has covered the song numerous times, including a duet with Dolly Parton herself in 2010. In 2017, Miley Cyrus and Jimmy Fallon (tambourine, backup vocals) performed a cover in disguise in the NYC Subway's Rockefeller Center station. In 2022, she included a cover of the song on her live album Attention: Miley Live.
- In 2010 South African duo the Alter Irving band recorded a "country-Rock" version with accompanying video. It was featured on their album "Chained to the Wind". The duo were Cindy Alter, formerly of South African all-girl group Clout, and Stewart Irving from Ballyhoo.
- In 2012, Grace Potter and the Nocturnals performed a notably slowed-down version of the song.
- In 2019, Nicole Zuraitis and the Dan Pugach Nonet performed a jazz version, which was nominated for a Best Arrangement, Instruments and Vocals Grammy award that year.
- In 2019, The Petersens recorded a bluegrass version of the song.
- In 2020, Chiquis and Becky G released a cumbia style Spanish-language cover of the song.
- In 2021, Lil Nas X covered the song in the BBC Radio 1's Live Lounge, alongside cuts from his debut album Montero.
- In 2024, Måneskin recorded a duet with Parton for the deluxe version of her forty-ninth album Rockstar.
- In 2026, Bad Wolves were set to record a cover with Parton herself contributing vocals; however, she died on August 25, 2026 before being able to record her parts. The cover was still slated for release by the band's record label on August 31, leading to the guitarist, AJ Rebollo, to quit the band in protest.
- In October 2026, Bronwen Lewis and Dolly Parton's niece, Jada Star, released a Welsh language version of the song. Parton herself also sang some lines in Welsh on this version, having recorded her parts at her studio in Nashville in early 2025.

== Answer songs ==
Kirsty MacColl's 1995 song "Caroline" was inspired by "Jolene" and is told from the other woman's point of view.

In 2013, country singer Jennifer Nettles recorded "That Girl", which she stated in interviews is a lyrical counterpoint to "Jolene". The song is written from the perspective of the Jolene character, who Nettles feels is unfairly maligned in the original song. In this version, the other woman is shown to have no interest in taking another woman's man, and her song is in fact framed as a warning to Parton's character that "her man" has a roving eye.

In 2017, American singer-songwriter Cam released her single "Diane" in response to Parton's song. The song is sung from Jolene's point of view, where she sings to 'Diane', Parton's character, and states that she did not know that 'her man' was her man. Cam noted to Rolling Stone Country that the song is her "response to Dolly Parton's 'Jolene.' It's the apology so many spouses deserve, but never get. The other woman is coming forward to break the news to the wife about an affair, respecting her enough to have that hard conversation, once she realized he was married. Because everyone should be able to decide their own path in life, based on the truth. Women especially should do this for each other, since our self-worth can still be so wrapped up in our partners. And in true country fashion, I've set the whole raw story to upbeat music, so you can dance while you process it all."

During the 2020 COVID-19 pandemic, linguist Gretchen McCulloch wrote a parody of the song entitled "Vaccine", inspired by Parton's $1 million donation funding research on a coronavirus vaccine. The parody was sung by English professor Ryan Cordell, and the video went viral. Dolly Parton broke into parody herself, singing "Vaccine, vaccine, vaccine, vaccine, I'm begging of you please don't hesitate" as she got a 'dose of her own medicine' in a March 2021 vaccination.

Chapel Hart released an answer song in 2021 titled "You Can Have Him Jolene". Okay Kaya released "Jolene From Her Own Perspective" in September 2022 as a single off her album SAP. She described it as "'Jolene' as a queer anthem" and jokingly as a "love note from a depraved bisexual".

In 2026, country singer Belles recorded a duet with Parton titled "Son of Jolene". Lyrically, the song is about "Jolene’s son taking his mother’s flirtatious traits", according to MusicRow writer LB Cantrell. The song was the last collaboration recorded by Parton prior to her August 2026 death.

== See also ==
- Epizeuxis – Repetition of a word or phrase in immediate succession for emphasis
- Sappho 31 – Fragment of a Greek lyric poem by Sappho
