= Here You Come Again (song) =

- Side A of the Australian single

Single by Dolly Parton

from the album Here You Come Again
- B-side: "Me and Little Andy"
- Released: September 26, 1977
- Recorded: June 1977
- Genre: Country pop
- Length: 2:59
- Label: RCA
- Songwriters: Barry Mann; Cynthia Weil
- Producer: Gary Klein

Dolly Parton singles chronology
"Light of a Clear Blue Morning" (1977)	"Here You Come Again" (1977)	"Two Doors Down" (1978)

"Here You Come Again" is a song written by Barry Mann and Cynthia Weil, and recorded by American entertainer Dolly Parton. It was released as a single in September 1977 as the title track from Parton's album of the same name, topped the U.S. country singles chart for five weeks, and was nominated for the 1978 Grammy award for Best Female Pop Vocal Performance; it also reached number three on the U.S. Billboard Hot 100, representing Parton's first significant pop crossover hit.

== Composition and recording ==
The song was composed by Mann and Weil, a rare example of a Parton hit that she did not write herself. The songwriting duo originally composed "Here You Come Again" in 1975 as a potential comeback hit for Brenda Lee, but when Lee decided not to record it, the song made its way to Parton, who was looking for something to broaden her appeal. Her producer, Gary Klein, who had heard the song on B. J. Thomas's recently released eponymous album, reported that Parton had begged him to add a steel guitar to avoid sounding too pop, and he called in Al Perkins to fill that role. "She wanted people to be able to hear the steel guitar, so if someone said it isn't country, she could say it and prove it," Klein told journalist Tom Roland. "She was so relieved. It was like her life sentence was reprieved."

The song is unusual in that the bridge incorporates an obligatory modulation which returns to the key one half-step higher. The first two verses are set in G♭ major, followed by A major for the first bridge, G major for the third verse, B♭ major for the second bridge, and finally A♭ major for the last verse and outro (as noted above, G♭ → G → A♭). The common time tempo is 106 beats per minute with a light swing feel. Parton's vocals range from G♭_{3} to D_{5}.

== Critical reception ==
"Here You Come Again" was the centerpiece of Parton's pop crossover in the late 1970s. The single spent five weeks at the top of the U.S Billboard country charts and reached number three on the U.S. Billboard Hot 100. It earned Parton a nomination for "Best Female Pop Vocal Performance" at the Grammy Awards. The song has sold 271,000 digital copies in the United States as of February 2019 since becoming available for digital download.

== Chart performance ==
=== Weekly charts ===
Chart (1977–1984)	Peak position
Australia (Kent Music Report)	10
Canadian RPM Country	1
Canadian RPM Top Singles	7
Canadian RPM Adult Contemporary	1
Netherlands (Single Top 100)	29
New Zealand (RMNZ)	12
UK Singles (Official Charts)	75
US Billboard Hot 100	3
US Easy Listening (Billboard)	2
US Hot Country Songs (Billboard)	1
US Cash Box Top 100	7

Chart (2026)	Peak position
Global 200 (Billboard)	133
Sweden Heatseeker (Sverigetopplistan)	2
UK Singles Sales (Official Charts)	7

=== Year-end charts ===
Chart (1978)	Rank
Australia (Kent Music Report)	71
Canada (RPM)	49
US Billboard Hot 100	60
US Cash Box	40
US Hot Country Songs (Billboard)	2
US Adult Contemporary Songs (Billboard)	24

== Certifications and sales ==
Region	Certification	Certified units/sales
Australia (ARIA)	Platinum	70,000^{‡}
Canada	—	75,000
New Zealand (RMNZ)	Gold	15,000^{‡}
United Kingdom (BPI)	Gold	497,690
United States (RIAA)	Platinum	1,000,000^{‡}
^{‡} Sales+streaming figures based on certification alone.

== Covers and other versions ==
- B. J. Thomas recorded the song for his self-titled 1977 album. This version was released before Parton's.
- Millie Jackson recorded the song in 1978, including it as the first track on the B-side of the album, Get It Out'cha System.
- Kikki Danielsson covered the song on her 1981 album Just Like a Woman, with lyrics written by herself in Swedish as Här är jag igen (translated: "Here I am again").
- In 2014, this song was covered by Katy Perry and Kacey Musgraves on a June 13, 2014, episode of CMT Crossroads. They also performed it on 2019 MusiCares Person of the Year event honoring Dolly Parton on February 8, 2019, and during the tribute performance for Parton on the 61st Annual Grammy Awards two days later.
