= Baby I'm Burnin' =

- US Promo single

Single by Dolly Parton

from the album Heartbreaker
- A-side: "I Really Got the Feeling"
- Released: November 6, 1978
- Recorded: 1978
- Genre: Disco; pop; country
- Length: 2:37; 4:30 (Disco Mix)
- Label: RCA
- Songwriter: Dolly Parton
- Producers: Gary Klein; Dolly Parton

Dolly Parton singles chronology
"Heartbreaker" (1978)	"Baby I'm Burnin'" (1978)	"I Really Got the Feeling" (1978)

"Baby I'm Burnin'" is a song by American singer-songwriter Dolly Parton. It was written by Parton who also produced the track with Gary Klein and Charles Koppelman who served as executive producer. The song was first released on Parton's twentieth solo studio album Heartbreaker in July 1978. It was released as a double A-side single with "I Really Got the Feeling" on November 6, 1978 by RCA Victor. "Baby I'm Burnin'" was aimed at pop radio, while "I Really Got the Feeling" was aimed at country radio. In addition to the standard 7-inch single, an extended 12-inch single titled Dance with Dolly was released, which included an extended dance remix of "Baby I'm Burnin'" backed with an extended dance remix of "I Wanna Fall in Love". Parton frequently performed "Baby I'm Burnin'" in concert, often using it as her opening number. She also used the song as the theme to her 1987–1988 television series Dolly. “Baby I’m Burnin’” was prominently featured on season 3, episode 4, of the hit TV Show Hacks.

== Critical reception ==
Billboard reviewed the single and called it "a high-energy change of pace for Parton." The review went on to say Parton's vocals "punch against the cooking groove of a track" which is "highlighted by horns and syn drums." Billboard reviewed the single again the following week, this time calling the song "a fiery rocker" and said that it had "a disco edge at times." They added that "Parton's crispy, high pitched vocals add to the rockish feel." Cashbox gave a positive review of the single, saying that the double-sided release "should cover all the bases." They compared "Baby I'm Burnin'" to Elvis Presley's "Way Down" and conclude by saying that both sides "should receive much airplay."

== Commercial performance ==
"Baby I'm Burnin'" peaked at number 25 on the Billboard Hot 100, number 48 on the Billboard Hot Country Songs chart, and number 11 on the Billboard Adult Contemporary chart. The disco remix peaked at number 15 on the Billboard Dance Club Songs chart.

== Charts ==
=== Weekly charts ===
Chart (1978–1979)	Peak position
Australia (Kent Music Report)	34
Canada Adult Contemporary (RPM)	9
Canada Country Singles (RPM)	1
Canada Top Singles (RPM)	30
US Adult Contemporary (Billboard)	11
US Billboard Hot 100	25
US Hot Country Songs (Billboard)	1
US Dance Club Songs (Billboard)	15

=== Year-end charts ===
Chart (1979)	Rank
US Hot Country Songs (Billboard)	32

== Other versions ==
- In 2011, singer/actress Geri Reischl recorded a rendition of the song which was mixed with "Burning Love."
