= StarWalk =

The StarWalk in Nashville, Tennessee, was an outdoor display of cement plaques honoring country music artists who had won Grammy Awards. Honorees left handprints and other personal markings along with written messages in the cement in the manner of Grauman's Chinese Theatre. At its opening, it was touted as "the country music equivalent to the Hollywood Walk of Fame".

== Background ==
The StarWalk project was a joint venture of the Fountain Square entertainment district and the Nashville branch of the National Academy of Recording Arts & Sciences. Fountain Square was a large area developed for business, shopping, and entertainment by Aladdin Resources Inc. The cement plaques formed a low wall running along a scenic lakeside pedestrian path. Each plaque was framed in brass, measured 3'×6', and weighed 700 pounds.

== Honorees ==
An announcement gala was held on January 27, 1987, to promote the project and reveal the first 10 inductees: Alabama, Chet Atkins, the Charlie Daniels Band, Crystal Gayle, Loretta Lynn, Ronnie Milsap, the Oak Ridge Boys, Jerry Reed, Conway Twitty, and Dottie West. The inaugural ceremony in August 1987 brought the number up to a total of 50, and most of them arrived in person to leave their marks. Beyond the 10 previously announced, inductees included Johnny Cash, Rosanne Cash, Tammy Wynette, Wynonna and Naomi Judd, Lynn Anderson, and Ricky Skaggs.

The developers planned to induct five past or future Grammy winners every year. The original wall had room for 150 commemorative plaques, and space had been set aside for expansion. Later inductees included Dolly Parton (1988), Jeannie C. Riley (1989), the Nitty Gritty Dirt Band (1990), Garth Brooks (1992), Emmylou Harris (1993), Brooks & Dunn, and Earl and Randy Scruggs (1997).

== Later years ==
By the early 1990s, the StarWalk had been transferred to a new home at Opryland theme park. After that venue closed in December 1997, the plaques were moved to locations outside the Grand Ole Opry House. The display was eventually retired and removed without fanfare.

== See also ==
- Music City Walk of Fame
