= New Harvest...First Gathering =

Studio album by Dolly Parton
- Released: February 14, 1977
- Recorded: August 19–December 17, 1976
- Studios: Soundshop, Nashville; Creative Workshop, Nashville
- Genres: Country; pop
- Length: 38:30
- Label: RCA Victor
- Producers: Dolly Parton; Gregg Perry

Dolly Parton chronology
All I Can Do (1976)	New Harvest...First Gathering (1977)	Here You Come Again (1977)

Singles from New Harvest...First Gathering
- 1. "Light of a Clear Blue Morning" Released: March 21, 1977; 2. "You Are" Released: March 25, 1977; 3. "Applejack" Released: August 27, 1977; 4. "(Your Love Has Lifted Me) Higher and Higher" Released: 1977

New Harvest...First Gathering is the eighteenth solo studio album by American entertainer Dolly Parton. It was released on February 14, 1977, by RCA Victor. It is significant for being Parton's first self-produced album, as well as her first effort aimed specifically at the pop charts.

== Content ==
In addition to her own compositions, Parton included the Temptations classic "My Girl" (sung as the gender-neutral "My Love"), and "(Your Love Has Lifted Me) Higher and Higher", originally a Jackie Wilson hit. "Applejack" features an all-star lineup of country legends singing background vocals, including Roy Acuff, Kitty Wells, Johnny Wright, Chet Atkins and Minnie Pearl.

== Critical reception ==
Professional ratings
Review scores
Source	Rating
AllMusic	4/5 stars
Christgau's Record Guide	B−
The Encyclopedia of Popular Music	4/5 stars
Record Mirror	5/5 stars

In the issue dated February 26, 1977, Billboard published a review calling the album "Parton's most progressive and individualistic LP ever. Changes in producer (Gregg Perry co-produces this with Dolly), studio, publisher and mental outlook are bound to have a significant effect on the ultimate product. The changes are dramatic and result in some of the most memorable work yet – in writing and singing – by Parton. She wrote most of the songs and vividly displays her stunning powers as a writer. This could be the album that shoves Parton from a country-only base to the category of across-the-board talents like Emmylou Harris and Linda Ronstadt who emulate and admire her."

Cashbox published a review in the February 26, 1977, issue, which said, "Breaking from her country roots, Dolly has put together this package of tailor-mades for the progressive rock listener. Her versatility and natural talents combined with her excellent production as well as arrangement comes crystal clear here." The New York Times noted that "the inflated, bathetic rhetoric of the arrangements will appeal to the Barry Manilow crowd, and to reject them (or him) somehow brands one antidemocratic."

== Commercial performance ==
The album was Parton's first No. 1 on the US Billboard Hot Country LPs chart and also peaked at No. 71 on the US Billboard 200 chart.

"You Are" was released as the first single from the album in March 1977 in Europe, but did not chart. However, in 1983 it reached the number 1 position in Dutch charts, at the time it was released from a compilation album titled "The Love Album".

The first single in North America, "Light of a Clear Blue Morning" was released in March 1977 and peaked at number 11 on the Billboard Hot Country Singles chart. It peaked at number one on the RPM Top County Singles chart.

"Applejack" had been issued as the B-side of "You Are" in Europe and would be re-promoted as the A-side later in 1977 and did not chart.

"(Your Love Has Lifted Me) Higher and Higher" was released as a single in Germany, but did not chart; it was not released as a single in the US, due, in part, to Rita Coolidge's cover of the song, which had reached the US top ten earlier in 1977.

== Track listing ==
All tracks are written by Dolly Parton, except as noted.

Side one
No.	Title	Writer(s)	Recording date	Length
1.	"Light of a Clear Blue Morning"		August 19, 1976	4:53
2.	"Applejack"		December 10, 1976	3:20
3.	"My Girl (My Love)"	William Robinson, Ronald White	December 3, 1976	3:44
4.	"Holdin' on to You"		August 22, 1976	2:46
5.	"You Are"		August 20, 1976	5:14

Side two
No.	Title	Writer(s)	Recording date	Length
1.	"How Does It Feel"		November 21, 1976	3:13
2.	"Where Beauty Lives in Memory"		December 10, 1976	3:50
3.	"(Your Love Has Lifted Me) Higher and Higher"	Gary Jackson, Carl Smith	December 16, 1976	2:52
4.	"Getting in My Way"		August 21, 1976	2:40
5.	"There"		December 17, 1976	5:32

== Personnel ==
Adapted from the album liner notes.

- Roy Acuff – backing vocals
- Rich Adler – engineer
- Chet Atkins – backing vocals
- Anita Ball – backing vocals
- Bashful Brother Oswald – backing vocals
- Stu Basore – steel
- Lea Jane Berinati – background vocals
- Clyde Brooks – drums, percussion, tambourine, backing vocals
- Mark Casstevens – banjo
- Charlie Chappelear – bass, backing vocals
- Ralph Childs – tuba
- Jimmy Colvard – acoustic guitars, electric guitar
- Jimmy Crawford – steel, backing vocals
- Richard Dennison – backing vocals
- Bobby Dyson – bass
- Bob Ferguson – Applejack's voice
- Mary Fielder – backing vocals
- Janie Fricke – backing vocals
- Hubert Gregory and the Fruit Jar Drinkers – backing vocals
- Joe and Rose Lee Maphis – backing vocals
- Shane Keister – organ synthesizer, organ
- The Kelly Kirkland Strings – string
- Dave Kirby – acoustic guitars
- Jerry Kroon – drums, percussion
- Larrie Londin – drums
- Brent Maher – engineer
- Kirk McGee – backing vocals
- Joe McGuffee – dobro, steel
- Terry McMillan – harmonica
- Farrell Morris – percussion
- The Nashville Horns – horns
- Jamie Nichol – conga
- Avie Lee Parton – backing vocals
- Dolly Parton – producer, lead vocals, backing vocals, banjo
- Lee Parton – backing vocals
- Randy Parton – backing vocals
- Minnie Pearl – backing vocals
- John Pell – acoustic guitar, classical guitar, backing vocals
- Gregg Perry – producer, piano, tambourine, keyboards, backing vocals, string arrangements, string conductor
- Debbie Joe Puckett – backing vocals
- Dwight Puckett – backing vocals
- Billy Puett – flute, piccolo, horns
- Jimmy Riddle – Jew's (juice) harp
- Don Roth – electric guitars
- Tom Rutledge – acoustic guitars
- Rod Smarr – electric guitar, acoustic guitars, slide guitar, backing vocals
- Buddy Spicher – fiddle
- Bobby Thompson – banjo, acoustic guitars
- Ernest Tubb – backing vocals
- Ray Walker – backing vocals
- Don Warden – backing vocals
- Kitty Wells – backing vocals
- The Willis Brothers – backing vocals
- Wilma Lee and Stoney Cooper – backing vocals
- Casey Worden – backing vocals
- Kelly Worden – backing vocals
- Mickie Worden – backing vocals
- Johnny Wright – backing vocals

== Charts ==
Chart performance for New Harvest...First Gathering
Chart (1977)	Peak position
US Top Country Albums (Billboard)	1
US Billboard 200	71
US Cashbox Country Albums	1
US Cash Box Top Albums	151

Singles

Year	Single	Chart	Peak position
1977	"Light of a Clear Blue Morning"	US Hot Country Singles (Billboard)	11
1977	"Light of a Clear Blue Morning"	US Hot 100 (Billboard)	87
1977	"Light of a Clear Blue Morning"	Canada Top Country Singles (RPM)	1

== Accolades ==
20th Annual Grammy Awards

Year	Nominee / work	Award	Result
1978	"(Your Love Has Lifted Me) Higher and Higher"	Best Country Vocal Performance, Female	Nominated

American Music Awards of 1978

Year	Nominee / work	Award	Result
1978	"New Harvest...First Gathering"	Favorite Country Album	Won

CMT Music Awards

Year	Nominee / work	Award	Result
1978	"New Harvest...First Gathering"	Album of the Year	Nominated
