= It's All Wrong, But It's All Right =

Single by Dolly Parton

from the album Here You Come Again
- A-side: "Two Doors Down"
- Released: February 27, 1978
- Genre: Country pop
- Length: 3:19
- Label: RCA
- Songwriter: Dolly Parton
- Producer: Gary Klein

Dolly Parton singles chronology
"Two Doors Down" (1978)	"It's All Wrong, But It's All Right" (1978)	"Heartbreaker" (1978)

"It's All Wrong, But It's All Right" is a song written and recorded by American entertainer Dolly Parton. It was released in February 1978 as the second single from the album Here You Come Again. (Percy Sledge recorded a song by the same name, but with different lyrics on his 1968 album Take Time to Know Her.) The song was Parton's seventh number one country single as a solo artist. The single stayed at number one for two weeks and spent a total of 10 weeks on the country chart. The song was part of a double-A-sided single, "Two Doors Down"/"It's All Wrong, But It's All Right", and while "It's All Wrong, But It's All Right" was topping the country singles charts, "Two Doors Down" had been released to pop radio, where it would reach the top 20 on the U.S. Hot 100.

== Content ==
In the song, the narrator calls a man whom she knows casually and suggests a one-time sexual encounter because she's lonely and "needs someone so much". In 1978, Parton—who'd had a previous song, "The Bargain Store", dropped by a number of country radio stations, when they mistakenly interpreted the lyrics as being sexually suggestive—explained to Playboy's Lawrence Grobel, that she was surprised at country radio's willingness to play "It's All Wrong but It's All Right", given how sexually suggestive that song's lyrics, in fact, were.

== In popular culture ==
The song was featured in the 1979 drama film Norma Rae, in which actress Sally Field won the Academy Award for Best Actress for her portrayal as Norma Rae Webster.

== Chart performance ==
Chart (1978)	Peak position
US Hot Country Songs (Billboard)	1
Canadian RPM Country Tracks	1
