= Here You Come Again =

Studio album by Dolly Parton
- Released: October 3, 1977
- Recorded: June 15 – August 5, 1977
- Studios: Sound Lab, Los Angeles
- Genres: Pop; country
- Length: 30:34
- Label: RCA Victor
- Producer: Gary Klein

Dolly Parton chronology
| New Harvest...First Gathering (1977) | Here You Come Again (1977) | Heartbreaker (1978) |

Singles from Here You Come again
- 1. "Here You Come Again" Released: September 26, 1977; 2. "Two Doors Down" Released: February 27, 1978; 3. "It's All Wrong, But It's All Right" Released: February 27, 1978; 4. "Me and Little Andy" Released: April 4, 1980

Here You Come Again is the nineteenth solo studio album by American entertainer Dolly Parton. It was released on October 3, 1977, by RCA Victor. The album was a commercial success, peaking at number 20 on the US Billboard 200, placing at number 2 on the Hot Country Albums year-end chart, and also being nominated for Favourite Country Album at the American Music Awards. It became Parton's first album to be certified platinum by the Recording Industry Association of America for shipping a million copies. The lead single and title track was also a success, entering the top five of the US Billboard Hot 100 and being nominated for Favourite Country Single at the American Music Awards.

== Critical reception ==
Professional ratings
Review scores
| Source | Rating |
|---|---|
| AllMusic | 3.5/5 stars |
| The Encyclopedia of Popular Music | 2/5 stars |
| The Rolling Stone Album Guide | 2/5 stars |

Billboard published a review of the album in the October 17, 1977, issue, which said, "This is by far Parton's most accessible pop crossover attempt. The material she chooses to work with, some by noted authors, others self penned, is delivered in Parton's little girl-sounding vocals. Her sweet-flowing voice becomes more and more likeable on each cut, emitting a warm innocence. The delicate string and horn accompaniment adds to the breezy, more subtle country effect. And the strong guitar work, pedal steel included, doesn't distract from Parton's vocals. Parton's title track single, which she sang on the Rock Awards television broadcast, is a sure bet to crack the Hot 100."

In the October 22, 1977, issue, Cashbox published a review saying, "Dolly's winning ways have convinced more than a few former non-believers that country and western audiences have no right to a monopoly on this songbird's talents. With this album, Dolly takes a giant step into the pop mainstream with a spicy repertoire that features only an occasional banjo or pedal steel lick. But even those who have seen her perform will have to be at least mildly surprised at how naturally proficient Dolly is at jumping into a completely new bag."

== Commercial performance ==
The album peaked at No. 1 on the US Billboard Hot Country LPs chart and No. 20 on the US Billboard 200 chart. In Canada, the album peaked at No. 12 on the RPM Canadian Albums chart.

The album's first single, "Here You Come Again", was released in October 1977 and peaked at No. 1 on the US Billboard Hot Country Singles chart, No. 3 on the US Billboard Hot 100 and No. 2 on the US Billboard Easy Listening chart. In Canada, the single peaked at No. 1 on the RPM Canadian Country Singles chart, No. 7 on the RPM Canadian Singles chart and No. 1 on the RPM Canadian Easy Listening chart. In Australia, the single peaked at No. 10 on the ARIA Top 100 Singles chart. The single also peaked a No. 75 on the OCC UK Singles Chart.

In February 1978, "Two Doors Down" and "It's All Wrong, But It's All Right" were issued as a double A-side single, aimed at the pop and country charts respectively. The version of "Two Doors Down" issued on the single was recorded by Parton in January 1978 and features a more pop sound than the album version. It would replace the original album version on all subsequent pressings of the album. "Two Doors Down" peaked at No. 19 on the US Billboard Hot 100 and No. 12 on the US Billboard Easy Listening chart. In Canada, the single peaked at No. 26 on the RPM Canadian Singles chart and No. 7 on the RPM Canadian Easy Listening chart. "It's All Wrong, But It's All Right" peaked at No. 1 on both the US Billboard Hot Country Singles chart and the RPM Canadian Country Singles chart.

In April 1980, "Me and Little Andy" was released as a single in the UK and it did not chart.

== Track listing ==
Side one
| No. | Title | Writer(s) | Recording date | Length |
|---|---|---|---|---|
| 1. | "Here You Come Again" | Barry Mann, Cynthia Weil | June 15, 1977 | 2:58 |
| 2. | "Baby Come Out Tonight" | Kathy McCord | June 15, 1977 | 3:28 |
| 3. | "It's All Wrong, But It's All Right" | Dolly Parton | July 22, 1977 | 3:17 |
| 4. | "Me and Little Andy" | Parton | August 2, 1977 | 2:40 |
| 5. | "Lovin' You" | John Sebastian | June 16, 1977 | 2:24 |

Side two
| No. | Title | Writer(s) | Recording date | Length |
|---|---|---|---|---|
| 6. | "Cowgirl & the Dandy" | Bobby Goldsboro | August 5, 1977 | 3:46 |
| 7. | "Two Doors Down" | Parton | August 1, 1977 | 3:07 |
| 8. | "God's Coloring Book" | Parton | August 1, 1977 | 3:13 |
| 9. | "As Soon as I Touched Him" | Norma Helms, Ken Hirsch | August 1, 1977 | 3:09 |
| 10. | "Sweet Music Man" | Kenny Rogers | June 15, 1977 | 3:08 |

== Personnel ==
Adapted from the album liner notes.

Performance

- Ben Benay – pedal steel
- Harry Bluestone – concertmaster
- Nick DeCaro – accordion, background vocals, conductor
- David Foster – keyboards, synthesizer
- Jan Gassman – background vocals
- Jay Graydon – pedal steel
- Jim Keltner - drums, percussion
- Ed Greene – drums
- David Hungate – bass
- David Lindley – slide guitar
- Myrna Matthews – background vocals
- Marti McCall – background vocals
- Gene Morford – background vocals
- Dean Parks – lead guitar, banjo
- Dolly Parton – lead vocals, background vocals
- Al Perkins – pedal steel
- Zedrick Turnbough – background vocals
- Dave Wolfert – pedal steel

Production

- Nick DeCaro – string arrangements, vocal arrangements
- Frank DeCaro – musical contractor, coordinator
- Jimmy Getzoff – concertmaster
- Don Henderson – assistant engineer
- Gary Klein – producer
- Charkes Kopplemann – executive producer
- Dean Parks – rhythm arrangements
- Mike Reese – mastering
- Armin Steiner – engineering, remixing
- Linda Tyler – assistant engineer
- Ian Underwood – synthesizer programming

Other personnel

- Ed Caraeff – photography, art direction, design
- Michael Manoogian – lettering

== Chart positions ==
Chart performance for Here You Come Again
| Chart (1977) | Peak position |
|---|---|
| US Top Country Albums (Billboard) | 1 |
| US Billboard 200 | 20 |
| Australia (Kent Music Report) | 83 |
| Canada Top Albums (RPM) | 12 |
| US Cashbox Country Albums | 1 |
| US Cash Box Top Albums | 19 |

Album (Year-End)

| Chart | Peak position |
|---|---|
| US Hot Country Albums (Billboard) | 2 |
| US Billboard 200 | 20 |

Singles

| Single | Chart | Peak position |
|---|---|---|
| "Here You Come Again" | US Hot Country Singles (Billboard) | 1 |
| "Here You Come Again" | US Hot 100 (Billboard) | 3 |
| "Here You Come Again" | US Easy Listening (Billboard) | 2 |
| "Here You Come Again" | Canada Country Singles (RPM) | 1 |
| "Here You Come Again" | Canada Top Singles (RPM) | 7 |
| "Here You Come Again" | Canada Adult Contemporary (RPM) | 1 |
| "Here You Come Again" | Australia Top 100 Singles (ARIA) | 10 |
| "Here You Come Again" | UK Singles Chart (OCC) | 75 |
| "Two Doors Down" | US Hot 100 (Billboard) | 19 |
| "Two Doors Down" | US Easy Listening (Billboard) | 12 |
| "Two Doors Down" | Canada Top Singles (RPM) | 26 |
| "Two Doors Down" | Canada Adult Contemporary (RPM) | 7 |
| "It's All Wrong, But It's All Right" | US Hot Country Singles (Billboard) | 1 |
| "It's All Wrong, But It's All Right" | Canada Country Singles (RPM) | 1 |

== Certifications ==
| Region | Certification | Certified units/sales |
|---|---|---|
| Australia (ARIA) | Gold | 35,000^{‡} |
| Canada (Music Canada) | Gold | 50,000^{^} |
| United States (RIAA) | Platinum | 1,000,000^{^} |
^{^} Shipments figures based on certification alone.^{‡} Sales+streaming figures based on certification alone.

== Accolades ==
Academy of Country Music Awards

| Year | Nominee / work | Award | Result |
|---|---|---|---|
| 1977 | Here You Come Again | Album of the Year | Nominated |

American Music Awards

| Year | Nominee / work | Award | Result |
|---|---|---|---|
| 1979 | Here You Come Again | Favorite Country Album | Nominated |
| 1979 | "Here You Come Again" | Favorite Country Single | Nominated |

Country Music Association Awards

| Year | Nominee / work | Award | Result |
|---|---|---|---|
| 1978 | Here You Come Again | Album of the Year | Nominated |
| 1978 | "Here You Come Again" | Single of the Year | Nominated |

20th Annual Grammy Awards

| Year | Nominee / work | Award | Result |
|---|---|---|---|
| 1978 | "Here You Come Again" | Best Pop Performance, Female | Nominated |

21st Annual Grammy Awards

| Year | Nominee / work | Award | Result |
|---|---|---|---|
| 1979 | Here You Come Again | Best Country Vocal Performance, Female | Won |

Nashville Songwriters Association International Awards

| Year | Nominee / work | Award | Result |
|---|---|---|---|
| 1979 | "Two Doors Down" | Songwriter Achievement Award | Won |
