= Two Doors Down (Dolly Parton song) =

- Canadian single

Single by Dolly Parton

from the album Here You Come Again
- A-side: "It's All Wrong, But It's All Right"
- Released: February 27, 1978
- Recorded: June 1977 (album version); February 1978 (single version)
- Genre: Country pop; disco
- Length: 3:09
- Label: RCA
- Songwriter: Dolly Parton
- Producer: Gary Klein

Dolly Parton singles chronology
"Here You Come Again" (1977)	"Two Doors Down" (1978)	"It's All Wrong, But It's All Right" (1978)

"Two Doors Down" is a song written and performed by Dolly Parton, which was a 1978 U.S. country and pop hit for her. The song is sung from the perspective of a woman who has just broken up with her boyfriend and is debating attending a party two doors down the hall from her apartment. She decides to go, meets a new man, and returns with him to her own apartment "two doors down". Parton revealed later that it was actually inspired by the night she had to stay in a motel room missing out on a party two doors down from her where they were having her favorite food that she couldn't have because of the diet she was on at the time.

It was included on Parton's 1977 Here You Come Again album. However, before Parton could release it as the album's second single in February 1978, singer Zella Lehr released a cover version that became a top ten U.S. country hit. While Lehr's version was on the country charts, the title cut of Here You Come Again was becoming a much bigger pop hit than Parton had anticipated. Wanting to capitalize on her newfound pop success (and also not wanting to compete with Lehr's country version of the song) Parton rerecorded a more loose, pop-oriented version of "Two Doors Down" with a slight disco flavoring. She released the new version on a double-A-sided single, with the other side, "It's All Wrong, but It's All Right" intended for country airplay, and "Two Doors Down" intended for the pop airplay. The single topped the U.S. country charts, and was a top-20 pop hit for Parton, and went on to become one of her most popular hits. Also in 1978 Joe Thomas did his own disco cover of this song.

Parton also had the new version of "Two Doors Down" (which omitted the first verse, and included an upbeat "sing-along" bridge) replace the previous version on all subsequent pressings of Here You Come Again, making the earlier version something of a collector's item among Parton's fans. The original version of "Two Doors Down" was subsequently issued on vinyl in 1978 on the UK & Ireland compilation Both Sides of Dolly Parton and on CD in 2000 on the 3-CD Australian compilation Legendary Dolly Parton.

== Chart performance ==
=== Dolly Parton ===
Chart (1978)	Peak position
U.S. Billboard Hot 100	19
U.S. Billboard Hot Adult Contemporary Tracks	12
Canadian RPM Top Singles	26
Canadian RPM Adult Contemporary Tracks	7
New Zealand (Recorded Music NZ)	30

=== Zella Lehr ===
Chart (1978)	Peak position
U.S. Billboard Hot Country Singles	7
Canadian RPM Country Tracks	5

=== Year-end charts ===
Chart (1978)	Position
US Hot Country Songs (Billboard)	39
