= Light of a Clear Blue Morning =

- 2004 re-release cover art

Single by Dolly Parton

from the album New Harvest...First Gathering
- B-side: "There"
- Released: March 21, 1977
- Recorded: 1976
- Genre: Country pop
- Length: 4:53
- Label: RCA
- Songwriter: Dolly Parton
- Producers: Dolly Parton, Gregg Perry

Dolly Parton singles chronology
"Hey, Lucky Lady" (1976)	"Light of a Clear Blue Morning" (1977)	"Here You Come Again" (1977)

"Light of a Clear Blue Morning" is a song written and recorded by American entertainer Dolly Parton. The song first appeared on her 1977 New Harvest...First Gathering album, and provided a top twenty country music hit for her as a single. As Parton has told interviewers over the years, "Light of a Clear Blue Morning" was her "song of deliverance," coming out of the pain from her break with longtime musical and business partner Porter Wagoner. Parton left Wagoner's band in 1974, to aim her career in a more mainstream pop direction; Wagoner responded by taking legal action, and the next couple of years were reportedly painful for both performers. According to the unauthorized 1978 biography, Dolly, by Alanna Nash, "Light of a Clear Blue Morning" was written as Parton felt the figurative clouds lifting, as the fruits of her sacrifices of the previous few years were becoming apparent.

Parton has recorded "Light of a Clear Blue Morning" four times. It was released as a single in March 1977 from the album New Harvest...First Gathering. The song just missed the top ten on the U.S. country charts, peaking at number 11. Parton rerecorded the song to include in her 1992 film Straight Talk; for this recording, she changed the lyrics of verse two. A third recording of the song appeared on an album of patriotic and religious songs Parton released in 2003 titled, For God and Country. Parton recorded the song a fourth time in January 2026, this time with fellow artists Lainey Wilson, Miley Cyrus, Queen Latifah, and Reba McEntire, to raise money for pediatric cancer research at the Monroe Carell Jr. Children's Hospital at Vanderbilt. This would be the last time Parton re-recorded the song before her death seven months later.

== Critical reception ==
Mark Deming of Allmusic declared that, "'Light of a Clear Blue Morning', is a sophisticated piece of adult contemporary songcraft".

On a list of top 50 Dolly Parton songs, Rolling Stone magazine ranked "Light of a Clear Blue Morning" at number 4, calling it symbolic of a "new-era Dolly — luminous, independent, and on the verge of superstardom."

== Chart performance ==
=== Original ===
Chart (1977)	Peak position
Canadian RPM Country Tracks	4
US Billboard Hot 100	87
US Hot Country Songs (Billboard)	11

=== 2026 re-recording ===
Chart (2026)	Peak position
New Zealand Hot Singles (RMNZ)	36
UK Singles Sales (OCC)	10
US Country Airplay (Billboard)	41
US Digital Song Sales (Billboard)	2

== Covers and other appearances ==
Glen Campbell covered the song on his 1991 album Unconditional Love.

American professional choir, Conspirare, covered it in 2009 live and for their album "A Company of Voices: Conspirare in Concert." The group's director, Craig Hella Johnson, created the arrangement for a cappella choir with recorder. Some choirs also perform it with flute, oboe or clarinet. The arrangement has been published and has since been performed by many choirs around the world. The arrangement omits verse 2.

The Wailin' Jennys covered the song on their 2017 album Fifteen.

Miley Cyrus covered the song on the May 8, 2021 episode of Saturday Night Live as a Mother's Day tribute. Cyrus honored her godmother, Parton, during the tribute along with her own and the cast member's mothers.

Morgan James covered the song in the May 14, 2021 airing of a PBS Special called We Are Family: Songs of Hope and Unity.

Waxahatchee included the song in an extended version of her 2020 album Saint Cloud, released to celebrate the album's one year anniversary with three cover songs added to the original tracklist.

On January 16, 2026, Dolly Parton released a new version of the song featuring Lainey Wilson, Miley Cyrus, Queen Latifah, Reba McEntire, The Christ Church Choir and David Foster on piano. All net proceeds from this recording and music video will benefit Pediatric Cancer Research at the Monroe Carell Jr. Children’s Hospital at Vanderbilt in Nashville, TN.
