= Heartbreaker (Dolly Parton song) =

1977 song written by Carole Bayer Sager and David Wolfert

"Heartbreaker" is a song written by Carole Bayer Sager and David Wolfert, and recorded by American country singer Randy Gurley and later by American entertainer Dolly Parton.

== Randy Gurley version ==
"Heartbreaker"

Song by Randy Gurley
- B-side: "Louisville"
- Released: November 1977
- Length: 3:00
- Label: ABC Dot DO-17728
- Songwriter: Carole Bayer Sager / David Wolfert
- Producer: Harold Bradley

Randy Gurley singles chronology
"Heartbreaker" (1977)	"Let Me Be the One" (1978)

Randy Gurley's version backed with "Louisville" was produced by Harold Bradley and released on ABC 4200 in November 1977.

=== Critical reception ===
The song was one of the seven recommended singles in the Country section of the Top Single Picks for the week ending November 12, 1977.

It was reviewed in the November 12, 1977 issue of Cash Box. The reviewer said that programmers who wanted to add a touch of "New breed" in country will find Randy Gurley with strings very appropriate. Her potential was also noted.

One of the Country Single Picks of the November 12 issue of Record World, the reviewer said that she made a great reading of the pop song, and her strong expressive vocals should launch it.

=== Airplay ===
The November issue of The Gavin Report recorded Gurley's being on the playlists of KFDI in Wichita. and KXOL in Fort Worth

Randy Gurley's being added to the playlists of KBET in Reno, Nevada, and KKYX in San Antonio, Texas was recorded by Radio & Records in the magazine's 18 November issue.

The December issue of The Gavin Report recorded Gurley being on the playlists of KLAK in Denver, KXOL in Fort Worth, and WBHP in Huntsville.,

=== Chart ===
"Heartbreaker" made its debut at no. 95 in the Cash Box Top 100 Country chart on the week of 26 November 1977. It held that position for one more week.

==== Summary ====
Chart (1978)	Peak Position
US Top 100 Country (Cash Box)	95

== Dolly Parton version ==
"Heartbreaker"

Single by Dolly Parton

from the album Heartbreaker
- B-side: "Sure Thing"
- Released: July 24, 1978
- Recorded: 1978
- Genre: Country pop
- Length: 3:36
- Label: RCA
- Songwriters: Carole Bayer Sager, David Wolfert
- Producer: Gary Klein

Dolly Parton singles chronology
"It's All Wrong, But It's All Right" (1978)	"Heartbreaker" (1978)	"Baby I'm Burnin'" (1978)

It was released in July 1978 as the first single and title track from the album Heartbreaker. The song topped the U.S. country singles chart, for three consecutive weeks, in mid-1978. "Heartbreaker" also peaked at #37 on the Billboard Hot 100 and #12 on the Easy Listening chart.

== Chart performance ==
Weekly

Chart (1978)	Peak position
Belgium (Ultratop 50 Flanders)	34
Canadian RPM Country Tracks	1
Canadian RPM Top Singles	41
Canadian RPM Adult Contemporary	1
Netherlands (Single Top 100)	20
US Hot Country Songs (Billboard)	1
US Billboard Hot 100	37
US Adult Contemporary (Billboard)	12

Year-End

Chart (1978)	Peak Position
US Hot Country Songs (Billboard)	5
