= Dolly Parton compilation albums discography =

Throughout Dolly Parton's career there have over 200 compilation albums released of her material. These compilations albums have been released on a variety of labels since the start of Parton's career, beginning with her first appearance on an LP record in 1963 to multi-disc, career-spanning box sets.

== Compilation albums ==
=== 1960s–1970s ===
List of compilation albums, with selected chart positions
| Title | Details | Peak chart positions | | | Certifications (sales thresholds) |
| Title | Details | US Country | AUS | UK | Certifications (sales thresholds) |
|---|---|---|---|---|---|
| Hits Made Famous by Country Queens | Released: April 13, 1963; Label: Somerset; Format: LP | — | — | — | |
| Dolly Parton Sings County Oldies | Released: 1968; Label: Stereo-Fidelity; Format: LP | — | — | — | |
| Dolly Parton and George Jones (with George Jones) | Released: 1969; Label: Starday; Format: LP, 8-track | — | — | — | |
| As Long as I Love | Released: June 8, 1970; Label: Monument; Format: LP | — | — | — | |
| The Best of Dolly Parton | Released: November 9, 1970; Label: RCA Victor; Format: LP | 12 | — | — | RIAA: Gold |
| Just the Way I Am | Released: September 1972; Label: RCA Camden; Format: LP, cassette | — | — | — | |
| The World of Dolly Parton | Released: 1972; Label: Monument; Format: LP | — | — | — | |
| Mine | Released: September 1973; Label: RCA Camden; Format: LP | — | — | — | |
| Dolly Parton | Released: 1974; Label: RCA Camden; Format: LP | — | — | — | |
| Best of Dolly Parton | Released: July 14, 1975; Label: RCA Victor; Format: LP, 8-track, cassette | 5 | — | — | |
| I Wish I Felt This Way At Home | Released: 1975; Label: Pickwick; Format: LP, 8-track | — | — | — | |
| Just Because I'm a Woman | Released: 1976; Label: Pickwick; Format: LP, 8-track | — | — | — | |
| This Is Dolly Parton | Released: 1976; Label: RCA Victor; Format: Cassette | — | — | — | |
| The Best of Jim Reeves and Dolly Parton (with Jim Reeves) | Released: 1976; Label: RCA Victor; Format: LP | — | — | — | |
| The Hits of Dolly Parton | Released: 1976; Label: RCA Victor; Format: LP, 8-track, cassette | — | — | — | |
| 18 Greatest Hits | Released: 1977; Label: RCA; Format: LP, cassette | — | — | — | ARIA: Gold |
| The Dolly Parton Story | Released: 1977; Label: CBS, Embassy; Format: LP, cassette | — | — | — | |
| In the Beginning | Released: March 20, 1978; Label: Monument; Format: LP, 8-track | — | — | — | |
| Both Sides of Dolly Parton | Released: 1978; Label: RCA Victor; Format: LP, 8-track, cassette | — | 37 | 24 | BPI: Gold |
| The Great Dolly Parton, Vol. 1 | Released: 1978; Label: Camden; Format: LP, cassette | — | — | — | |
| Country Friends (with Johnny Cash) | Released: 1979; Label: Queen; Format: Cassette | — | — | — | |
| The Dolly Parton Collection | Released: 1979; Label: RCA Camden; Format: 2xLP | — | — | — | |
| Recital: Ses Plus Grands Succès | Released: 1979; Label: K-Tel; Format: LP, cassette | — | — | — | |
| The Great Dolly Parton, Vol. 2 | Released: 1979; Label: Camden | — | — | — | |
| Dolly Parton & Chris LeDoux (with Chris LeDoux) | Released: 1979; Label: Queen; Format: LP, cassette | — | — | — | |
"—" denotes a recording that did not chart or was not released in that territory.

=== 1980s ===
List of compilation albums, with selected chart positions
| Title | Details | Peak chart positions | | | | | Certifications (sales thresholds) |
| Title | Details | US | US Country | AUS | CAN | UK | Certifications (sales thresholds) |
|---|---|---|---|---|---|---|---|
| Love Is Like a Butterfly | Released: 1980; Label: Camden; Format: LP, cassette | — | — | — | — | — | |
| A Real Country Dolly | Released: 1980; Label: RCA International; Format: LP, cassette | — | — | — | — | — | |
| You Are | Released: 1980; Label: RCA International; Format: LP, cassette | — | — | — | — | — | |
| Dolly Parton & Kitty Wells (with Kitty Wells) | Released: 1980; Label: Exact; Format: LP | — | — | — | — | — | |
| Country Music: Dolly Parton | Released: 1981; Label: Time Life; Format: LP | — | — | — | — | — | |
| Golden Favorites | Released: 1981; Label: RCA Special Products; Format: LP, cassette | — | — | — | — | — | |
| The Very Best | Released: 1981; Label: RCA Victor; Format: LP, cassette | — | — | — | — | — | |
| The Very Best of Dolly Parton | Released: 1981; Label: RCA; Format: LP, cassette | — | — | — | — | — | |
| Dolly | Released: 1981; Label: RCA International; Format: LP | — | — | — | — | — | |
| Best | Released: 1981; Label: RCA; Format: LP | — | — | — | — | — | |
| I Love You | Release: 1982; Label: RCA International; Format: LP, cassette | — | — | — | — | — | |
| Dolly Parton | Released: 1982; Label: RCA Camden, Pickwick International; Format: LP, cassette | — | — | — | — | — | |
| Just the Way I Am | Released: 1982; Label: Pair, RCA Special Products; Format: LP, cassette | — | — | — | — | — | |
| Greatest Hits | Released: September 13, 1982; Label: RCA; Format: LP, 8-track, cassette | 77 | 7 | — | 58 | 74 | RIAA: Platinum; ARIA: Gold; BPI: Silver |
| More of the Best of Dolly Parton | Released: 1982; Label: RCA; Format: LP | — | — | — | — | — | |
| Best of Dolly Parton | Released: 1982; Label: K-Tel; Format: LP | — | — | — | — | — | |
| The Magic of Dolly Parton | Released: 1982; Label: RCA Records; Format: LP, cassette | — | — | — | — | — | |
| The Winning Hand (with Willie Nelson, Kris Kristofferson and Brenda Lee) | Released: November 1, 1982; Label: Monument; Format: LP, 8-track, cassette | 109 | 4 | — | — | — | |
| Queens of Country (with Donna Fargo) | Released: 1983; Label: Sundown; Format: LP, cassette | — | — | — | — | — | |
| The Love Album | Released: 1983; Label: RCA; Format: LP, cassette | — | — | — | — | — | NVPI: Platinum |
| The Best of Dolly Parton | Released: 1984; Label: Reader's Digest; Format: LP, cassette | — | — | — | — | — | |
| Her Greatest Hits and Finest Performances | Released: 1984; Label: RCA, Reader's Digest; Format: LP | — | — | — | — | — | |
| Honky Tonk Angels | Released: 1984; Label: AVM; Format: LP, cassette | — | — | — | — | — | |
| King & Queen of Country (with Kenny Rogers) | Released: 1984; Label: Lucky; Format: LP | — | — | — | — | — | |
| Two of a Kind (with Donna Fargo) | Released: 1984; Label: Movie Play Portuguesa, Breakaway Tapes; Format: Cassette | — | — | — | — | — | |
| With Love from Dolly Parton | Released: 1985; Label: RCA Camden; Format: LP, cassette | — | — | — | — | — | |
| Portrait | Released: 1985; Label: Pair, RCA Special Products; Format: LP, cassette | — | — | — | — | — | |
| Letter to Heaven (with Donna Fargo, Lynn Anderson, and Billie Jo Spears) | Released: 1985; Label: Success; Format: LP, cassette | — | — | — | — | — | |
| Collector's Series | Released: June 3, 1985; Label: RCA; Format: LP, cassette, CD | — | — | — | — | — | |
| The Love Album 2 | Released: 1985; Label: RCA; Format: LP, cassette, CD | — | — | — | — | — | |
| 12 of Her Biggest No. 1 Hits | Released: 1985; Label: RCA Custom, Reader's Digest; Format: LP, 8-track, cassette | — | — | — | — | — | |
| Lynn Anderson & Dolly Parton (with Lynn Anderson) | Released: 1985; Label: Success; Format: LP, cassette, CD | — | — | — | — | — | |
| Magic Moments with Dolly Parton | Released: 1985; Label: RCA; Format: Cassette | — | — | — | — | — | |
| 16 Greatest Love Songs | Released: 1985; Label: RCA Victor; Format: LP | — | — | — | — | — | |
| Dolly Parton's 16 Biggest Hits | Released: 1986; Label: J & B; Format: LP, cassette | — | — | 27 | — | — | |
| Think About Love | Released: April 15, 1986; Label: RCA; Format: LP, cassette, CD | — | 54 | — | — | — | |
| Autograph | Released: 1986; Label: Jugodisk; Format: LP, cassette | — | — | — | — | — | |
| The Very Best of Willie & Dolly (with Willie Nelson) | Released: 1987; Label: Reader's Digest; Format: LP, cassette | — | — | — | — | — | |
| The Very Best of Kenny Rogers & Dolly Parton (with Kenny Rogers) | Released: 1987; Label: EVA Imperial; Format: LP, cassette, CD | — | — | — | — | — | |
| Save the Last Dance for Me | Released: 1987; Label: RCA Camden; Format: LP, cassette | — | — | — | — | — | |
| Best of Dolly Parton, Vol. 3 | Released: September 22, 1987; Label: RCA; Format: LP, cassette, CD | — | — | — | — | — | |
| Dolly | Released: c. 1987; Label: RCA, BMG Africa; format: LP, cassette, CD | — | — | — | — | — | |
| The Best There Is | Released: July 1987; Label: RCA Victor; Format: LP, cassette | — | — | — | — | — | |
| Willie Nelson & Waylon Jennings - Dolly Parton & Donna Fargo (with Willie Nelson, Waylon Jennings, and Donna Fargo) | Released: 1987; Label: P.M.C.; Format: CD | — | — | — | — | — | |
| Her Greatest Hits | Released: 1987; Label: RCA BV Holland; Format: LP | — | — | — | — | — | |
| 16 Top Tracks | Released: 1988; Label: RCA; Format: CD | — | — | — | — | — | |
| Everything's Beautiful | Released: 1988; Label: Success; Format: CD | — | — | — | — | — | |
| 14 of Her Greatest Hits | Released: 1988; Label: RCA; Format: Cassette | — | — | — | — | — | |
| The Very Best of Dolly Parton | Released: 1988; Label: RCA Special Products; Format: LP | — | — | — | — | — | |
| Greatest Hits | Released: 1989; Label: RCA, BMG; Format: LP, cassette, CD | — | — | — | — | — | |
| Country Heroes: Dolly Parton | Released: 1989; Label: Ariola Express; Format: Cassette, CD | — | — | — | — | — | |
| Kenny Rogers & Dolly Parton, Vol. 1 (with Kenny Rogers) | Released: 1989; Label: Success; Format: LP, CD | — | — | — | — | — | |
| Kenny Rogers & Dolly Parton, Vol. 2 (with Kenny Rogers) | Released: 1989; Label: Success; Format: LP, CD | — | — | 80 | — | — | |
"—" denotes a recording that did not chart or was not released in that territory.

=== 1990s ===
List of compilation albums, with selected chart positions and certifications
| Title | Details | Peak chart positions | | | Certifications (sales thresholds) |
| Title | Details | US Country | AUS | UK | Certifications (sales thresholds) |
|---|---|---|---|---|---|
| Het Beste van Dolly Parton | Released: 1990; Label: EVA; Format: Cassette, CD | — | — | — | |
| 16 Greatest Hits (with Lynn Anderson and Donna Fargo) | Released: 1990; Label: 16 Tons; Format: CD | — | — | — | |
| Best Love Songs | Released: 1991; Label: Muse; Format: Cassette, CD | — | — | — | |
| Her Greatest Hits | Released: 1991; Label: Muse; Format: Woodford Music | — | — | — | |
| Anthology | Released: 1991; Label: Connoisseur Collection; Format: CD | — | — | — | |
| Country Girl | Released: 1991; Label: EMI Records; Format: CD | — | — | — | |
| De Hits van Dolly Parton | Released: 1991; Label: Prijzenslag; Format: CD | — | — | — | |
| Favourites with Kenny Rogers) | Released: 1992; Label: Success; Format: Cassette, CD | — | — | — | |
| Favourites | Released: 1992; Label: Pickwick; Format: Cassette, CD | — | — | — | |
| The Best of Dolly Parton | Released: 1992; Label: Procom International; Format: Cassette | — | — | — | |
| As Long as I Love | Released: 1992; Label: Zillion; Format: CD | — | — | — | |
| Jolene | Released: 1992; Label: BMG Africa; Format: CD | — | — | — | |
| The Collection | Released: 1992; Label: Castle Communications; Format: CD | — | — | — | |
| Country Classics | Released: 1993; Label: Reader's Digest; Format: Cassette, CD | — | — | — | |
| The RCA Years, 1967–1986 | Released: 1993; Label: RCA; Format: Cassette, CD | — | — | — | |
| The Little Things: 18 Great Country Songs | Released: 1993; Label: Country Stars; Format: Cassette, CD | — | — | — | |
| I Will Always Love You: 36 All-Time Greatest Hits! | Released: 1993; Label: GSC Music; Format: Cassette, CD | — | — | — | |
| The River Unbroken | Released: 1993; Label: Versailles, Sony Music Special Marketing; Format: CD | — | — | — | |
| The New Best of Dolly Parton | Released: 1993; Label: RCA; Format: CD | — | — | — | |
| The Collection | Released: 1993; Label: RCA, BMG; Format: Cassette, CD | — | — | — | |
| Dolly Parton & Friends | Released: 1993; Label: Gold; Format: CD | — | — | — | |
| The Greatest Hits | Released: 1994; Label: Telestar; Format: Cassette, CD | — | — | 65 | |
| Here I Come Again | Released: 1994; Label: Castle Communications; Format: CD | — | — | — | |
| Best Selection | Released: July 6, 1994; Label: RCA; Format: CD | — | — | — | |
| I Will Always Love You: The Essential Dolly Parton One | Released: March 28, 1995; Label: RCA; Format: Cassette, CD | — | — | — | ARIA: Gold |
| The Great Dolly Parton | Released: 1995; Label: Goldies; Format: CD | — | — | — | |
| Gold | Released: 1995; Label: BMG Africa; Format: CD | — | — | — | |
| Super Stars (with Kenny Rogers) | Released: 1995; Label: Super Stars; Format: CD | — | — | — | |
| Største Hits | Released: 1995; Label: RCA, BMG; Format: CD | — | — | — | |
| Gold (with Kenny Rogers) | Released: 1995; Label: Gold; Format: CD | — | — | — | |
| 2 Gether on 1 (Just Because I'm A Woman / Just Between You and Me) | Released: September 4, 1995; Label: RCA; Format: CD | — | — | — | |
| I Will Always Love You and Other Greatest Hits | Released: April 1996; Label: Columbia; Format: Cassette, CD | 47 | — | — | |
| Super Hits | Released: 1996; Label: RCA; Format: Cassette, CD | — | — | — | RIAA: Gold |
| Honky Tonk Angel | Released: 1996; Label: Golden Stars; Format: CD | — | — | — | |
| Legendary Country Singers | Released: 1996; Label: Time Life Music; Format: Cassette, CD | — | — | — | |
| 24 Karat Gold | Released: 1996; Label: BMG; Format: Cd | — | — | — | |
| The Essential Dolly Parton Volume Two | Released: 1997; Label: RCA; Format: Cassette, CD | — | — | — | |
| The Encore Collection | Released: 1997; Label: BMG Special Products; Format: Cassette, CD | — | — | — | |
| The Best of Dolly Parton | Released: 1997; Label: Camden; Format: CD | — | — | — | ARIA: Gold; BPI: Silver |
| I Believe: The Encore Collection | Released: September 16, 1997; Label: BMG Special Products; Format: Cassette, CD | — | — | — | |
| A Life in Music: The Ultimate Collection | Released: October 27, 1997; Label: RCA; Format: CD | — | 36 | 38 | ARIA: Gold; BPI: Gold |
| Greatest Hits | Released: 1998; Label: Columbia River Entertainment Group; Format: CD | — | — | — | |
| The Ultimate Hit Collection | Released: 1998; Label: BMG Africa; Format: CD | — | — | — | |
| The Best of Kenny Rogers & Dolly Parton (with Kenny Rogers) | Released: 1998; Label: Ring; Format: CD | — | — | — | |
| Wildest Dreams | Released: 1998; Label: Sony Music Entertainment Germany; Format: CD | — | — | — | |
| The Ultimate Collection | Released: 1998; Label: RCA, BMG; Format: CD | — | — | — | |
| Dolly Parton et Kenny Rogers (with Kenny Rogers) | Released: 1999; Label: Master Tone; Format: CD | — | — | — | |
| Love Songs | Released: 1999; Label: Camden, BMG; Format: CD | — | — | — | BPI: Silver |
| Super Hits | Released: 1999; Label: Columbia; Format: Cassette, CD | — | — | — | |
| Columbus Stockade Blues / Just the Way I Am / Heartaches by the Number (with Willie Nelson and Waylon Jennings) | Released: 1999; Label: RCA Camden; Format: CD | — | — | — | |
| Dolly & Kenny (with Kenny Rogers) | Released: 1999; Label: Golden Stars; Format: CD | — | — | — | |
| Dolly Parton & Kenny Rogers (with Kenny Rogers) | Released: 1999; Label: IMC Music; Format: CD | — | — | — | |
"—" denotes a recording that did not chart or was not released in that territory.

=== 2000s ===
List of compilation albums, with selected chart positions and certifications
| Title | Details | Peak chart positions | | | | | Certifications (sales thresholds) |
| Title | Details | US | US Country | AUS | SWE | UK | Certifications (sales thresholds) |
|---|---|---|---|---|---|---|---|
| Kenny Rogers & Dolly Parton (with Kenny Rogers) | Released: 2000; Label: Golden Giants; Format: CD | — | — | — | — | — | |
| Legendary Dolly Parton | Released: 2000; Label: RCA, BMG; Format: CD | — | — | — | — | — | ARIA: Platinum |
| Favoritter | Released: 2000; Label: BMG Norway; Format: CD | — | — | — | — | — | |
| Midnight Country: Dolly Parton, Volume 2 | Released: 2001; Label: Dressed to Kill, Metrodome; Format: CD | — | — | — | — | — | |
| Back to Back (with Kitty Wells) | Released: 2001; Label: Pegasus; Format: CD | — | — | — | — | — | |
| Gold: Greatest Hits | Released: February 19, 2001; Label: RCA, BMG, C2M; Format: CD | — | — | — | — | 23 | BPI: Silver |
| Dolly Parton & Friends (with Sandy Posey and Donna Fargo) | Released: 2001; Label: Forever Gold; Format: CD | — | — | — | — | — | |
| Mission Chapel Memories, 1971-1975 | Released: October 9, 2001; Label: Raven; Format: CD | — | — | — | — | — | |
| Queen of Country | Released: 2001; Label: BMG Heritage; Format: CD | — | — | — | — | — | |
| Jolene / My Tennessee Mountain Home | Released: 2001; Label: Camden Deluxe, BMG; Format: CD | — | — | — | — | — | |
| Here You Come Again | Released: 2001; Label: RCA, BMG Sweden; Format: CD | — | — | — | 4 | — | GLF: Gold |
| Dolly Parton | Released: 2001; Label: Azzurra Music | — | — | — | — | — | |
| Kenny Rogers & Dolly Parton (with Kenny Rogers) | Released: 2001; Label: Weton-Wesgram; Format: CD | — | — | — | — | — | |
| Joshua & Coat of Many Colors | Released: 2001; Label: Camden Deluxe | — | — | — | — | — | |
| Kenny Rogers & Dolly Parton (with Kenny Rogers) | Released: 2002; Label: A-Play; Format: CD | — | — | — | — | — | |
| Greatest Hits | Released: 2002; Label: Camden; Format: CD | — | — | — | — | — | GLF: Gold |
| RCA Country Legends | Released: 2002; Label: RCA, BMG Heritage; Format: CD | — | — | — | — | — | |
| The Ultimate Collection | Released: 2002; Label: BMG Belgium; Format: CD | — | — | — | — | — | |
| Country Legends | Released: March 15, 2002; Label: Green Hill, Spring Hill Music Group; Format: CD | — | — | — | — | — | |
| Super Hits | Released: 2002; Label: Federal, Gusto, BMG Special Products; Format: CD | — | — | — | — | — | |
| The Collection | Released: 2002; Label: Marks & Spencer; Format: CD | — | — | — | — | — | |
| Love Songs | Released: January 6, 2003; Label: RCA, BMG; Format: CD | — | — | — | — | — | |
| Ultimate Dolly Parton | Released: June 3, 2003; Label: RCA Nashville, BMG Heritage; Format: CD | 5 | 3 | 49 | 8 | 17 | RIAA: Gold; ARIA: Platinum; BPI: Platinum |
| Ultimate Dolly Parton (two-disc version) | Released: June 3, 2003; Label: RCA Nashville, BMG Heritage; Format: CD | — | 74 | — | — | — | |
| Wanted (with Kenny Rogers) | Released: 2003; Label: Weton-Wesgram; Format: CD | — | — | — | — | — | |
| The Bluegrass Collection | Released: October 27, 2003; Label: BMG UK & Ireland; Format: CD | — | — | — | — | — | |
| All American Country | Released: 2003; Label: BMG Special Products; Format: CD | — | — | — | — | — | |
| Artist Collection | Released: 2004; Label: RCA, BMG; Format: CD | — | — | — | — | — | |
| The Collection | Released: 2004; Label: Spectrum Music, Universal; Format: CD | — | — | — | — | — | |
| Together (with Lynn Anderson) | Released: 2004; Label: Black Cat; Format: CD | — | — | — | — | — | |
| Platinum & Gold Collection | Released: May 4, 2004; Label: RCA Nashville | — | — | — | — | — | |
| The Only Dolly Parton Album You'll Ever Need | Released: June 7, 2004; Label: BMG; Format: CD | — | — | — | — | 127 | |
| The Best of Dolly Parton | Released: 2004; Label: Sony Music; Format: CD | — | — | — | — | — | |
| The Great Dolly Parton | Released: 2004; Label: Rajon Music Group; Format: CD | — | — | — | — | — | |
| Power Hits | Released: 2004; Label: Great Value Music; Format: CD | — | — | — | — | — | |
| The Essential Dolly Parton | Released: 2005; Label: RCA, Legacy; Format: CD | 86 | — | 140 | 46 | — | GLF: Gold |
| American Music Legends | Released: 2005; Label: Cracker Barrel, BMG; Format: CD | — | — | — | — | — | |
| Legends | Released: 2005; Label: Sony BMG; Format: CD | — | — | — | — | 190 | |
| Country Legend | Released: 2005; Label: IMC Music; Format: CD | — | — | — | — | — | |
| Covered by Dolly | Release: 2005; Label: Sterling; Format: CD | — | — | — | — | — | |
| 17 Country Recordings (with Jim Reeves) | Released: 2006; Label: PT Music; Format: CD | — | — | — | — | — | |
| Dolly Parton | Released: 2006; Label: Direct Douce Special Products; Format: CD | — | — | — | — | — | |
| Love Songs | Released: 2006; Label: RCA Nashville; Format: CD | — | — | — | — | — | |
| The Acoustic Collection, 1999-2002 | Released: October 10, 2006; Label: Sugar Hill, Blue Eye; Format: CD + DVD | — | — | — | — | — | |
| Kenny & Dolly (with Kenny Rogers) | Released: 2006; Label: Payless Entertainment; Format: CD | — | — | — | — | — | |
| Kenny, Dolly, Tammy & George (with Kenny Rogers, Tammy Wynette and George Jones) | Released: 2006; Label: Payless Entertainment; Format: CD | — | — | — | — | — | |
| Goue Treffers Van Dolly Parton & Anne Murray (with Anne Murray) | Released: 2005; Label: Select Musiek; Format: CD | — | — | — | — | — | |
| Makin' Believe (with Kenny Rogers) | Released: 2006; Label: Fame; Format: CD | — | — | — | — | — | |
| Singer, Songwriter & Legendary Performer | Released: February 25, 2007; Label: Dolly; Format: CD | — | — | — | — | — | |
| Burlap & Satin and Real Love | Released: March 5, 2007; Label: RCA, Sony BMG Music Entertainment; Format: CD | — | — | — | — | — | |
| Great Balls of Fire and Dolly, Dolly, Dolly | Released: March 5, 2007; Label: RCA, Sony BMG Music Entertainment; Format: CD | — | — | — | — | — | |
| All I Can Do and New Harvest...First Gathering | Released: March 5, 2007; Label: RCA, Sony BMG Music Entertainment; Format: CD | — | — | — | — | — | |
| The Very Best of Dolly Parton | Released: March 25, 2007; Label: Sony BMG; Format: CD | — | — | 21 | 1 | 8 | ARIA: Platinum; BPI: Platinum; GLF: 2× Platinum |
| 16 Biggest Hits | Released: August 7, 2007; Label: RCA Nashville, Legacy; Format: CD | — | 32 | — | — | — | |
| The Very Best of Dolly Parton, Vol. 2 | Released: August 20, 2007; Label: Sony BMG; Format: CD | — | — | — | — | — | |
| Greatest Hits (with Don Williams) | Released: 2007; Label: Play 24-7; Format: CD | — | — | — | — | — | |
| Triple Feature: Eagle When She Flies / White Limozeen / Slow Dancing with the Moon | Released: 2007; Label: Sony Music; Format: CD | — | — | — | — | — | |
| Always, Always / Two of a Kind (with Porter Wagoner) | Released: 2007; Label: American Beat; Format: CD | — | — | — | — | — | |
| Playlist: The Very Best of Dolly Parton | Released: April 29, 2008; Label: RCA Nashville, Legacy; Format: CD | — | 57 | — | — | — | US: 210,400 |
| Love Songs | Released: 2008; Label: Sony BMG Music Entertainment; Format: CD | — | — | — | — | — | |
| Collector's Edition | Released: June 24, 2008; Label: Madacy Records, Sony BMG Music Entertainment; Format: CD | — | — | — | — | — | |
| Gold: Greatest Hits | Released: 2008; Label: Sony BMG Music Entertainment; Format: CD | — | — | — | — | — | |
| Official Masters: Greatest Hits | Released: 2008; Label: Sony BMG; Format: CD | — | — | — | — | — | |
| Original Album Classics: Just Because I'm a Woman / Coat of Many Colors / My Tennessee Mountain Home / Jolene / 9 to 5 and Odd Jobs | Released: 2008; Label: RCA, Legacy, Sony BMG Music Entertainment; Format: CD | — | — | — | — | 12 | |
| Greatest Hits | Released: 2009; Label: Sony Music; Format: CD | — | — | — | — | — | |
| From the Heart | Released: 2009; Label: RCA, Legacy; Format: CD | — | — | — | — | — | |
| Dolly | Released: October 27, 2009; Label: RCA Nashville, Legacy; Format: CD | — | 59 | — | — | — | |
"—" denotes a recording that did not chart or was not released in that territory.

=== 2010s–2020s ===
List of compilation albums, with selected chart positions and certifications
| Title | Details | Peak chart positions | | | | Certifications (sales thresholds) |
| Title | Details | US | US Country | AUS | UK | Certifications (sales thresholds) |
|---|---|---|---|---|---|---|
| 3 Original Album Classics (Eagle When She Flies / Slow Dancing with the Moon / White Limozeen) | Released: February 8, 2010; Label: Sony, Legacy, Columbia; Format: CD | — | — | — | — | |
| Letter to Heaven: Songs of Faith & Inspiration | Released: May 4, 2010; Label: Sony Legacy; Format: CD, digital download | — | — | — | — | |
| The Fairest of Them All / My Favorite Songwriter, Porter Wagoner | Released: June 14, 2010; Label: Omni; Format: CD | — | — | — | — | |
| Playlist: The Very Best Gospel of Dolly Parton | Released: October 12, 2010; Label: RCA Nashville, Legacy; Format: CD | — | — | — | — | |
| The Gospel Collection | Released: November 2, 2010; Label: Camden; Format: CD | — | — | — | — | |
| Triple Feature: Coat of Many Colors / My Tennessee Mountain Home / Jolene | Released: November 9, 2010; Label: Sony Music; Format: CD | — | — | — | — | |
| Super Hits / Heartbreaker | Released: November 9, 2010; Label: Allegro, Sony Music; Format: CD | — | — | — | — | |
| Wanted | Released: December 14, 2010; Label: Jukebox; Format: Digital download | — | — | — | — | |
| From the Heart | Released: 2010; Label: Sony Music Entertainment South Africa; Format: CD | — | — | — | — | |
| Dolly Parton & Friends (with Margo, Johnny Cash, Lynn Anderson, Billie Jo Spears, Connie Francis, Patsy Cline, Willie Nelson, and Frankie Lane) | Released: 2010; Label: The Irish Mail on Sunday; Format: CD | — | — | — | — | |
| Original Artists | Released: 2011; Label: PT Music; Format: CD | — | — | — | — | |
| Original Album Classics: Rainbow / White Limozeen / Eagle When She Flies / Honky Tonk Angels / Something Special | Released: 2011; Label: Sony, Legacy, Columbia; Format: CD | — | — | — | — | |
| 14 Great Hits | Released: 2011; Label: Sony Music Entertainment Africa; Format: CD | — | — | — | — | |
| The Hits | Released: November 6, 2012; Label: Camden; Format: CD | — | — | 100 | — | |
| De Største Hits | Released: 2013; Label: Sony Music; Format: CD | — | — | — | — | |
| The Real...Dolly Parton | Released: October 14, 2013; Label: Sony Music; Format: CD | — | — | — | 88 | BPI: Gold |
| The Very Best of Dolly Parton | Released: December 20, 2013; Label: Sony Music; Format: CD | — | — | — | — | |
| The Box Set Series | Released: January 28, 2014; Label: RCA, Legacy; Format: CD | — | — | — | — | |
| Nashville Stories | Released: July 24, 2015; Label: Feel Good; Format: CD | — | — | — | — | |
| The Complete Trio Collection (with Emmylou Harris and Linda Ronstadt) | Released: September 9, 2016; Label: Rhino; Format: CD, digital download | 125 | 7 | — | 47 | |
| My Dear Companion: Selections from the Trio Collection (with Emmylou Harris and Linda Ronstadt) | Released: September 9, 2016; Label: Rhino; Format: CD | — | — | 3 | — | |
| Farther Along (with Emmylou Harris and Linda Ronstadt) | Released: September 9, 2016; Label: Rhino; Format: LP | — | — | — | — | |
| The Chronological Classics, 1959–1966 | Released: December 4, 2020; Label: Kipepeo Publishing; Format: CD | — | — | — | — | |
| Back to Back (with Kenny Rogers) | Released: 2020; Label: Musicbank; Format: LP | — | — | — | — | |
| Early Dolly | Released: July 23, 2021; Label: Stardust; Format: LP | — | — | — | — | |
| Diamonds & Rhinestones: The Greatest Hits Collection | Released: November 18, 2022; Label: Sony, Legacy; Format: CD, LP, digital download, streaming | 27 | 4 | 47 | — | |
| The Monument Singles Collection: 1964-1968 | Released: April 21, 2023; Label: Monument, Legacy; Format: Digital download, streaming | — | 43 | — | — | |
"—" denotes a recording that did not chart or was not released in that territory.
