= Best of Dolly Parton =

Greatest hits album by Dolly Parton
- Released: July 14, 1975
- Recorded: 1971–1975
- Genre: Country
- Label: RCA Victor
- Producer: Porter Wagoner

Dolly Parton chronology
The Bargain Store (1975)	Best of Dolly Parton (1975)	Say Forever You'll Be Mine (1975)

Alternative cover
- Revised cover art for the CD reissue

Professional ratings
Review scores
Source	Rating
AllMusic	4.5/5 stars
Christgau's Record Guide	A+

Best of Dolly Parton is a 1975 compilation album of Dolly Parton's early 1970s work that has long been regarded by critics as the definitive representation of Parton's most influential period. The album reached number 5 on the U.S. country albums chart, and contained the title tracks to the previous six Parton albums, as well as the tracks "I Will Always Love You" and "Traveling Man".

== Background and release ==
The album was titled Best of Dolly Parton, although RCA Records had previously released an album titled The Best of Dolly Parton in 1970, which remained in print at the time of this disc's release, as it would for several more years. The album tracks, graphics and catalog numbers were different for the two albums (and this release does not have "The" as part of the title) but still there was some confusion about the albums. This album is occasionally referred to as "The Best of Dolly Parton Vol. 2", but it never was released under that title, though a third "best of" collection was released in 1987, Best of Dolly Parton, Vol. 3, suggesting RCA regarded this collection as Volume 2, even if they did not include that designation in the title.

The album's original release included an 11 x 20" poster of the album cover inside the disc slip. The album's back cover features a large photograph of Parton in a yellow jumpsuit, a rare photograph picture from the period playing up Parton's curves and bust.

The original album was a gatefold design with an additional photo of Parton and the printed song lyrics in the inner section (including an additional final verse to "Coat of Many Colors" that is not included in the recorded version). For unknown reasons, when the album was reissued on CD in the 1990s, the inner gatefold photo was used on the outer cover, rather than the cover photo of the original album release. The order of some of the songs on the reissue was changed as well.

Eight of the ten songs were self-penned, major country hits for Parton, the gospel song "When I Sing for Him", written by Porter Wagoner, was released as a single but did not chart. "Lonely Comin' Down", also by Wagoner, was never issued as a single (though this same recording was included on two different studio albums: 1972's My Favorite Songwriter: Porter Wagoner, and 1974's Jolene).

The album is credited as "Produced and arranged by Porter Wagoner", although Bob Ferguson was credited as producer on the respective original albums.

== Track listing ==
All songs written by Dolly Parton unless otherwise noted.

No.	Title	Writer(s)	Length
1.	"Jolene"		2:36
2.	"Traveling Man"		2:10
3.	"Lonely Comin' Down"	Porter Wagoner	3:07
4.	"The Bargain Store"		2:39
5.	"Touch Your Woman"		2:39
6.	"I Will Always Love You"		2:53
7.	"Love Is Like a Butterfly"		2:19
8.	"Coat of Many Colors"		3:02
9.	"My Tennessee Mountain Home"		3:04
10.	"When I Sing for Him"	Porter Wagoner	2:56

== Charts ==
Chart performance for Best of Dolly Parton
Chart (1975)	Peak position
US Top Country Albums (Billboard)	5
US Cashbox Country Albums	4
