= Playlist: The Very Best of Dolly Parton =

Greatest hits album by Dolly Parton
- Released: April 29, 2008
- Recorded: Compilation
- Genre: Country
- Length: 45:08
- Label: Legacy, RCA Nashville

Dolly Parton chronology
Backwoods Barbie (2008)	Playlist: The Very Best of Dolly Parton (2008)	Sha-Kon-O-Hey! Land of Blue Smoke (2009)

Playlist: The Very Best of Dolly Parton is a compilation album from Dolly Parton released as part of the Legacy Recordings Playlist series. The album features 14 tracks from her years at RCA Nashville ranging from her first #1 country single, 1970's "Joshua" to her 1983 #1 country and pop smash "Islands in the Stream" with Kenny Rogers. Despite Columbia Records and RCA Nashville both being owned by Sony BMG, none of her Columbia Records material is represented here. The CD is packaged in eco-friendly recycled cardboard packaging and in lieu of an actual paper booklet, the disc includes a PDF file with song credits, photos, a biography of Parton and wallpapers.

== Critical reception ==
Professional ratings
Review scores
Source	Rating
AllMusic	3.5/5 stars

Playlist: The Very Best of Dolly Parton received three and a half out of five stars from Al Campbell of AllMusic. Campbell wrote that "while most will want a greatest-hits package with other mega-hits […] this is still a decent set."

== Track listing ==
No.	Title	Writer(s)	Length
1.	"Joshua"	Dolly Parton	3:05
2.	"Coat of Many Colors"	Parton	3:05
3.	"Touch Your Woman"	Parton	2:41
4.	"Mission Chapel Memories"	Parton, Porter Wagoner	3:08
5.	"In the Good Old Days (When Times Were Bad)"	Parton	3:28
6.	"My Tennessee Mountain Home"	Parton	3:10
7.	"Jolene"	Parton	2:41
8.	"I Will Always Love You"	Parton	2:55
9.	"Lonely Comin' Down"	Wagoner	3:15
10.	"Love Is Like a Butterfly"	Parton	2:21
11.	"The Bargain Store"	Parton	2:43
12.	"Here You Come Again"	Barry Mann, Cynthia Weil	2:54
13.	"9 to 5" (remix)	Parton	3:01
14.	"Islands in the Stream" (duet with Kenny Rogers)	Barry Gibb, Robin Gibb, Maurice Gibb	4:09

== Chart performance ==
Playlist: The Very Best of Dolly Parton peaked at number 57 on the U.S. Billboard Top Country Albums chart the week of July 26, 2008.

Chart (2008)	Peak position
U.S. Billboard Top Country Albums	57
