= RCA Camden discography =

RCA Camden was a budget record label launched by RCA Victor in 1955. Initially a classical label, it later expanded to include re-releases of older pop records, including those of Elvis Presley.

== Mono ==
- CAL-100 Warwick Symphony Orchestra: Tchaikovsky Nutcracker Suite; Saint-Saens Carnival of the Animals
- CAL-101 Boston Symphony Orchestra: Peter and the Wolf, Op. 67; Till Eulenspiegel's Merry Pranks
- CAL-102 London Philharmonic Orchestra: Beethoven: Symphony No. 3 in E-Flat
- CAL-103 London Philharmonic Orchestra: Beethoven: Symphony No. 5 in C-Minor
- CAL-104 The Philadelphia Orchestra: Dvořák: Symphony No. 5, in E Minor, Op. 95
- CAL-106 Schubert: Symphony No. 8 in B Minor "Unfinished", Schubert: Symphony No. 5 in B Flat. Centennial Symphony Orchestra
- CAL-107 San Francisco Symphony: Franck: Symphony in D Minor
- CAL-110 San Francisco Symphony: Stravinsky: The Rite of Spring
- CAL-112 RCA Victor Symphony Orchestra: The Heart Of the Symphony: Excerpts from Beethoven, Dvořák, Tchaikovsky, Schubert, Franck, Rimsky-Korsakov
- CAL-113 RCA Victor Symphony Orchestra: The Heart Of The Piano (Excerpts): Bach, Mozart, Schumann, Grieg, Beethoven, Rachmaninoff, Tchaikovsky, Gershwin
- CAL-116 Boston Pops Orchestra: William Tell Overture, 1812 Overture
- CAL-117 Cromwell Symphony Orchestra: Grieg: Peer Gynt Suite No. 1 Indianapolis Symphony Orchestra: Grieg: Peer Gynt Suite No. 2
- CAL-120 Warwick Symphony Orchestra: Concert Classics
- CAL-121 Minneapolis Symphony Orchestra: Light Concert Classics
- CAL-123 Warwick Symphony Orchestra: Concert Gems
- CAL-124 Richard Crooks: The Songs of Stephen Foster
- CAL-125 The Goldman Band: America Marches
- CAL-126 Boston Pops Orchestra The Viennese Magic Of Johann Strauss, Jr.
- CAL-127 Boston Pops Orchestra: Johann Strauss Favorites
- CAL-128 Because, The Lost Chord
- CAL-131 Kenny Baker: Song Hits Through the Years
- CAL-132 Jorge Negrete: Jorge Negrete
- CAL-133 Joe Reichman: Tea For Two
- CAL-134 Goodfellows Male Chorus: Hail! Hail! The Gang's All Here
- CAL-135 Raymond Paige Orchestra: Stardust Melodies
- CAL-139 Harold Coates and His Orchestra: Famous Songs From Famous Musicals
- CAL-143 Lew White: Organ Cameos
- CAL-152 Star Symphony Orchestra: Tchaikovsky: Symphony No. 6 in B-Minor ("Pathétique")
- CAL-155 Cromwell Symphony Orchestra/Centennial Symphony Orchestra: R. Strauss-Der Rosenkavalier Suite/Tchaikovsky, Grieg, Liadoff and Moussorgsky-Excerpts and pieces
- CAL-156 Boston Symphony Orchestra Ravel: Daphnis et Chloe Suite No. 1; San Francisco Symphony Ravel: Daphnis et Chloe Suite No. 2, Valse Nobles et Sentimentales
- CAL-161 Boston Symphony Orchestra Ravel: Mother Goose Suite, Bolero; San Francisco Symphony Debussy: Images Nos. 1 and 3
- CAL-163 Warwick Symphony Orchestra (Philadelphia Orchestra) Music For Easter: Rimsky-Korsakov "Russian Easter Overture", Wagner "Prelude" & "Good Friday Spell" from Parfisal
- CAL-168 A Lawrence Tibbett Program
- CAL-171 Lawrence Tibbett Sings Operatic Arias
- CAL-174 Boston Symphony Orchestra: Bach: Concertoi for Orchestra in D Bach: Brandenburg Concerto No. 3 in G Bach: Brandenburg Concerto No. 4 in G
- CAL-177 Music by George Gershwin Music by Victor Herbert
- CAL-179 E. Robert Schmitz, Pianist: Debussy - Preludes: Book 1
- CAL-180 E. Robert Schmitz, Pianist: Debussy - Preludes: Book 2
- CAL-186 Cromwell Symphony Orchestra: Vaughan Williams-Symphony No. 2 'A London Symphony'
- CAL-188 Cromwell Symphony Orchestra/Stratford Symphony Orchestra: Schumann-Symphony No. 4 in D minor, Op. 120/Mozart-Symphony No. 40 in G minor, K. 550
- CAL-189 Cromwell Symphony Orchestra/Sutton Symphony Orchestra: Stravinsky—The Song of the Nightingale (Symphonic Poem)/Richard Strauss—Death and Transfiguration
- CAL-196 Bernstein Conducts Bernstein: "Jeremiah" Symphony, On the Town Ballet Music, Facsimile
- CAL-198 Pierre Luboshutz and Genia Nemenoff - Two-Piano Favorites
- CAL-199 John Charles Thomas Sings Operatic Arias and Operetta Favorites
- CAL-200 Dick Leibert: Music in a Mellow Mood
- CAL-202 Philadelphia Orchestra: Richard Strauss: Don Quixote
- CAL-203 Philadelphia Orchestra: Stravinsky: Petrouchka Suite Borodin: Prince Igor (Dances Of the Polovetzki Maidens)
- CAL-204 Dominion Symphony Orchestra: Holst: The Planets (Mars, Venus, Mercury and Jupiter)
- CAL-207 An Erica Morini Recital
- CAL-209 The Trapp Family Singers: Present Christmas and Folk Songs
- CAL-214 Ravel: Concerto for Piano and Orchestra Copeland, Bernstein Savoy Symphany Orchestra Leonard Bernstein pianist conductor
- CAL-221 The Heart of the Opera: Vol. 1, Carmen and Faust
- CAL-222 The Heart of the Opera: Vol. 2, La Bohème and Madam Butterfly
- CAL-227 The Heart of the Opera: Vol. 7, La Traviata and the Marriage Of Figaro
- CAL-229 Ray Kinney and His Coral Islanders: Hawaiian Favorites
- CAL-233 Memorable Music From the Movies
- CAL-234 Hits From Broadway Shows
- CAL-239 Listen To The Music Of Sigmund Romberg
- CAL-245 John Jacob Niles Sings American Folk Sings
- CAL-249 Favorite Arias From Favorite Operas: Aïda, Carman, Madama Butterfly, La Bohème, Pagliacci, Rigoletto, Tannhäuser
- CAL-255 Guy Lombardo: Plays
- CAL-258 Van der Linden Orchestra: Floating on a Cloud
- CAL-259 Van der Linden Orchestra: Casino on the Riviera
- CAL-260 Van der Linden Orchestra: Listen to Nature Songa
- CAL-261 Sammy Kaye Orcheatra: Music For Dancing
- CAL-263 Jesse Crawford At The Organ
- CAL-264 Freddy Martin: Dancing Party
- CAL-265 The Art of Josef Lhevinne: Chopin, Debussy, Schumann, Strauss
- CAL-268 Allan Jones Sings Great Show Tunes
- CAL-270 Andre Musette Orchestra: Polka Party
- CAL-271 David Whitehall Orchestra: Moonglow and Music
- CAL-274 Giovanni Martinelli Sings by Request
- CAL-277 Wayne King and His Orchestra: Let's Dance!
- CAL-278 David Whitehall Orchestra: Love's Several Faces
- CAL-281 Paris Conservatory Orchestra: Berlioz: Symphonie Fantastique, Op. 14
- CAL-294 The Biggest Hits of 1955
- CAL-295 Ray McKinley: One Band: 2 Styles
- CAL-300 Jesse Crawford: Pipe Organ Magic
- CAL-303 Deep River Boys Presenting The Deep River Boys
- CAL-304 Boston Pops Orchestra: Rhapsody in Blue/Concerto in F
- CAL-309 Toscanini and the Philharmonic-Symphony Orchestra of New York: The Sorcerer's Apprentice, Semiramide Overture
- CAL-310 The Art of Paderewski
- CAL-311 The Art of Harold Bauer, Vol 1
- CAL-315 Freddy Martin and His Orchestra: Make Believe (Music of Jerome Kern)
- CAL-316 Tex Beneke Orchestra: Stardust
- CAL-318 The Biggest Hits of '56, Vol. 1
- CAL-319 12 Instrumental Hits
- CAL-321 Dinah Shore, Lena Horne: Lower Basin Street
- CAL-323 Xavier Cugat and His Waldorf-Astoria Orchestra: That Latin Beat!
- CAL-325 Jeanette MacDonald: Smilin' Through
- CAL-326 Toscanini and the Philharmonic-Symphony Orchestra of New York: Variations on a Theme by Haydn, Barber of Seville Overture, "Haffner" Symphony, Scherzo from "Midsummer Night's Dream"
- CAL-328 Great Jazz Pianists
- CAL-329 Vaughn Monroe and His Orchestra: Dance With Me!
- CAL-330 John Jacob Niles 50th Anniversary Album
- CAL-331 The Biggest Hits of ’56, Vol. 2
- CAL-336 Great Artists at Their Best, Vol 1 - Conductors
- CAL-346 Great Artists at Their Best, Vol 3 - Operatic Stars
- CAL-348 The Art of Harold Bauer, Vol 2
- CAL-351 Great Artists at Their Best, Vol 4 - Instrumentalists
- CAL-352 Toscanini and the Philharmonic-Symphony Orchestra of New York: Symphony No. 7, in A, Op.92
- CAL-369 Al Goodman And His Orchestra: Sweethearts
- CAL-371 Rhythm and Blues (Arthur Crudup, Little Richard, Red Callender Sextett)
- CAL-373 The Art of Bidú Sayão
- CAL-377 The Art of Moriz Rosenthal
- CAL-378 Lotte Lehmann Sings Lieder, Vol 1
- CAL-379 Hugo Winterhalter Orchestra: The Magic Touch
- CAL-386 Gioacchino Rossini / Bruno Landi, Wilfred Engelman, Lucille Browning, Hilde Reggiani, Carlos Ramirez (3), Lorenzo Alvary, John Gurney (3) - RCA Victor Symphony Orchestra And Chorus* Conductor Giuseppe Bamboschek The Barber Of Sevilla
- CAL-395 Count Basie Orchestra The Count
- CAL-396 Sergei Rachmaninoff The Art of Sergei Rachmaninoff, Vol 1
- CAL-401 The Art of Ezio Pinza
- CAL-402 Lionel Hampton Jivin' The Vibes
- CAL-403 Perry Como Dream Along With Me
- CAL-407 John McCormack (2) John McCormack Sings Irish Songs
- CAL-409 Perez Prado Mambo Happy!
- CAL-410 Amelita Galli-Curci* The Art Of Galli-Curci
- CAL-411 Al Goodman & his Orchestra* Annie Get Your Gun/selections from The Helen Morgan Story
- CAL-414 Guy Melendy (George Wright) Pop Pipe Organ in Hi-Fi
- CAL-420 Little Richard And Buck Ram Little Richard
- CAL-430 Jim Breedlove Rock 'N' Roll Hits
- CAL-440 Perry Como Sings Just For You
- CAL-446 Various Dixieland And New Orleans Jazz
- CAL-449 Hugo Winterhalter and His Orchestra And Chorus* Christmas Magic
- CAL-450 Mario Lanza You Do Something To Me
- CAL-453 Cantor Josef Rosenblatt* Masterpieces Of The Synagogue
- CAL-454 The Three Suns, The Happy-Go-Lucky Sound
- CAL-456 Phil Harris That's What I Like About The South
- CAL-457 Phil Silvers, Nanette Fabray High Button Shoes
- CAL-459 Duke Ellington And His Orchestra At The Cotton Club
- CAL-463 David Rose And His Orchestra: Holiday For Strings
- CAL-472 The Three Suns, Lead Kindly Light: 12 Favorite Hymns
- CAL-473 Fats Waller The Real Fats Waller
- CAL-479 Harry Lauder The Immortal Harry Lauder
- CAL-490 Mundell Lowe and his All Stars: Porgy & Bess
- CAL-497 Count Basie Basie's Basement
- CAL-507 Cantor Josef Rosenblatt* Masterpieces Of The Synagogue, Volume 2
- CAL-510 Leo Addeo Hawaii In Hi-Fi
- CAL-513 The Three Suns, At The Candlelight Cafe
- CAL-514 Hank Snow, The Singing Ranger* And His Rainbow Ranch Boys The Singing Ranger
- CAL-515 Artie Shaw: Swings Show Tunes
- CAL-517 Lionel Hampton And Orchestra* Open House
- CAL-522 Mundell Lowe and his All Stars: TV Action Jazz!
- CAL-523 Various The Greatest Hits Of '59, Volume 1
- CAL-564 Brook Benton Brook Benton
- CAL-572 Dinah Shore - Vivacious Dinah Shore
- CAL-579 Maurice Chevalier Toujours Maurice
- CAL-583 Jim Reeves According To My Heart
- CAL-586 The Carter Family, The Original And Great Carter Family
- CAL-591 Robert Brereton Pipe Organ Encores In Hi-Fi
- CAL-592 Fred Astaire Dance Studio Orchestra Continental And Argentine Tangos
- CAL-594 Leo Addeo And His Orchestra More Hawaii In Hi-Fi
- CAL-597 "Yossele" (Cantor) Rosenblatt, Songs of My People
- CAL-623 Johann Strauss, Jr.* : Oslo Philharmonic Orchestra*, Oivin Fjeldstad Waltzes
- CAL-624 Benny Goodman Swing, Swing, Swing
- CAL-627 Mundell Lowe And His All Stars - Themes from Mr. Lucky, the Untouchables and Other TV Action Jazz
- CAL-635 John McCormack (2) John McCormack Sings Sacred Music *CAL-650 Tommy Dorsey The One And Only Tommy Dorsey
- CAL-653 George Beverly Shea Tenderly He Watches
- CAL-659 Chet Atkins And His Guitar
- CAL-660 Perry Como Sings Merry Christmas Music
- CAL-667 Selections from The Unsinkable Molly Brown (musical), music and lyrics by Meredith Willson, arranged and conducted by Elliot Lawrence w Sandy Stewart (singer) and Bernie Knee.
- CAL-672 Leo Addeo And His Orchestra Great Standards With A Hawaiian Touch
- CAL-680 Hank Snow The Southern Cannonball
- CAL-686 Jim Reeves The Country Side Of Jim Reeves
- CAL-690 Living Strings Living Strings Play "The Waltz You Saved For Me" And Other Favorite Waltzes
- CAL-704 Davey Gibbs (The Country Kid) and His Country Hoppers (LP) 1962
- CAL-719 Bill Monroe And His Blue Grass Boys* The Father Of Bluegrass Music
- CAL-720 Geraldo And His Orchestra Cruise Along - Dance Along To The Music Of Geraldo
- CAL-722 Hank Snow The One And Only Hank Snow
- CAL-727 Pete Fountain Dixieland - Live Performance In New Orleans
- CAL-733 Living Guitars Living Guitars Play
- CAL-742 Perry Como An Evening With Perry Como
- CAL-748 Living Voices Living Voices Sing Ramblin' Rose And Other Hits
- CAL-753 Chet Atkins The Guitar Genius
- CAL-753 RE Chet Atkins The Guitar Genius
- CAL-760 Living Strings Holiday For Strings
- CAL-768 Homer And Jethro The Humorous Side Of Country Music
- CAL-769 Porter Wagoner A Satisfied Mind
- CAL-772 Scotty Stevenson
- CAL-774 Monroe Brothers, The* Early Blue Grass Music
- CAL-777 Mario Lanza Christmas Hymns And Carols
- CAL-782 Hank Snow The Last Ride
- CAL-784 Jim Reeves Good 'N' Country
- CAL-786 Living Voices Living Voices Sing Hootenany Favorites
- CAL-793 Various The Country Stars! The Country Hits!
- CAL 800 Dedicated To You Tommy Dorsey
- CAL-803 Living Strings On A Sentimental Journey (LP, Album) 1964
- CAL-805 Perry Como Love Makes The World Go 'Round (LP, Mono) 1964
- CAL-825 Boots Randolph The Yakin' Sax Man (LP, Album, Mono) 1964
- CAL-827 Living Guitars Music From the Pink Panther and Other Hits (LP, Album) 1964
- CAL-831 Malcolm Dodds Try A Little Tenderness (LP) 1964
- CAL-836 Hank Snow The Old And Great Songs (LP, Album, Mono) 1964
- CAL-842 Jim Reeves Have I Told You Lately That I Love You? (LP) 1964
- CAL-844 Living Guitars Shindig (LP, Album) 1964
- CAL-845 Bob Ralston (2) Music For Everyone (LP, Album) 1964
- CAL-850 George Beverly Shea Christmas With George Beverly Shea (LP)
- CAL-872 Benny Goodman And His Orchestra Featuring Great Vocalists Of Our Times (LP, Mono) 1965
- CAL-878 Philip Bodner* Living Jazz (LP, Mono) 1965
- CAL-884 Living Guitars Teen Beat Discothèque (LP, Mono) 1965
- CAL-903 Roger Miller The One And Only (LP, Album, Mono) 1965
- CAL-927 Ray Martin And His Orchestra Thunderball And Other Thriller Music (LP, Mono) 1965
- CAL-931 Hawkshaw Hawkins The Country Gentleman (LP) 1966
- CAL-941 Perry Como No Other Love (LP, Mono) 1966
- CAL-942 Porter Wagoner Your Old Love Letters And Other Country Hits (LP, Mono) 1966
- CAL-942 (e) Porter Wagoner Your Old Love Letters And Other Country Hits (LP) 1966
- CAL-961 Living Marimbas Tijuana Taxi (Album) ◄ (2 versions) 1966
- CAL-961 Living Marimbas Tijuana Taxi (LP, Album, Mono) 1966
- CAL-983 John Gary The One And Only (LP, Album, Mono) 1966
- CAL-984 Various Artists The Men In A Country Girl's Heart (LP, Album, Mono) 1966
- CAL-1003 Dorothy Olsen with Marty Gold Orchestra: Lullabies for Sleepyheads
- CAL-1008 Paul Wing, James Stewart (4) The Little Engine That Could (LP, Mono) 1960
- CAL-1012 Shirley Temple With Tootlepipers, The Walt Disney's Bambi Also The Tootlepipers' Zoo
- CAL-1024 Engelbert Humperdinck (2) / Franz Allers Hansel And Gretel: The Original Soundtrack (LP, Mono) 1960
- CAL-1030 Dorothy Olsen: Songs About Animals and Birds for Children
- CAL-1038 Bob Hastings with Walter Fleisher's Orchestra: 45 Songs Children Love To Sing 1960
- CAL-1046 Jack Mercer, Mae Questel Popeye's Favorite Stories (LP) 1960
- CAL-1049 Playtime Band, Mary Syme (LP Mono)
- CAL-1051 Dr. Seuss Dr. Seuss Presents "Horton Hatches The Egg", "The Sneetches" And Other Stories (LP, Album, Mono) 1964
- CAL-1063 Dr. Seuss Fox In Socks / Green Eggs And Ham (LP, Mono) 196
- CAL-1065 Carmel Quinn: Patrick Muldoon and His Magic Balloon
- CAL-2103 Living Strings Songs Of Inspiration (LP, Mono) 1966
- CAL-2114 Living Brass In A Little Spanish Town
- CAL-2131 King Ganam Square Dances
- CAL-2170 Soul Finders, The Sweet Soul Music
- CAL-2390 Edith Piaf, (1969), Une Chanson a trois temps <Album Cover>
- CAL-2184 Living Marimbas Tonight Carmen And Other Country Favorites
- CAL-2428 Elvis Presley: Elvis' Christmas Album-
- CAL-2473 The Carter Family, The Featuring A. P. Carter* Lonesome Pine Special
- CAL-2518 Elvis Presley: C'mon Everybody-
- CAL-2533 Elvis Presley: I Got Lucky
- CBL-100 The Art of Rosa Ponselle (2-Record Album)

== Stereo ==
- CAS-22 Merit Hemmingson Plays (LP) 1968
- CAS-284 13 Exitos
- CAS-403 Perry Como: Dream Along with Me
- CAS-440 Perry Como Sings Just For You
- CAS-450 Mario Lanza: You Do Something to Me
- CAS-465 The Great Artie Shaw
- CAS-471 Eddy Arnold: That's How Much I Love You
- CAS-480 Grieg* / Oslo Philharmonic Orchestra, The*, Odd Grüner-Hegge Peer Gynt Suites, Nos. 1 And 2
- CAS-489 Tchaikovsky / Oslo Philharmonic Orchestra, The*, Odd Grüner-Hegge Symphony No. 5 in E minor, Op.65 (LP, Liv) 1959
- CAS-501 Sid Bass And His Orchestra With Bells On (LP, Album) 1959
- CAS-510 Leo Addeo And His Orchestra Hawaii In Stereo (LP) 1959
- CAS-530 Mello-Larks, The Just For A Lark (LP, Liv) 1959
- CAS-555 Geraldo and His Orchestra: Dance, Dance, Dance; Vol.2; The Broadway Scene
- CAS-562 RCA Camden Rockers Rocking The Standards (LP, Album)
- CAS-568 (e) George Beverly Shea George Beverly Shea (LP) 1960
- CAS-583 Jim Reeves According To My Heart (LP)
- CAS-583 (e) Jim Reeves According To My Heart (LP) 1960
- CAS-594 Leo Addeo And His Orchestra More Hawaii In Hi-Fi (LP) 1960
- CAS-637 Living Strings Living Strings Play Music For Romance (LP) 1960
- CAS-638 Living Strings Living Strings Play Music In The Night (LP) 1960
- CAS-639 Living Strings Living Strings Play Music Of The Sea (LP) 1960
- CAS-650 The One and Only Tommy Dorsey
- CAS-655 Tex Beneke And His Orchestra Music From The Film "The Alamo" (LP, Album) 1960
- CAS-659 (e) Chet Atkins The Early Years Of Chet Atkins And His Guitar (12", Album, Enh, RE)
- CAS-659 (e) Chet Atkins Chet Atkins And His Guitar (LP) 1964
- CAS-661 Living Strings Play Music Of Hawaii (LP)
- CAS-667 Selections From The Unsinkable Molly Brown, music and lyrics by Meredith Willson, arranged and conducted by Elliot Lawrence with Sandy Stewart (singer) and Bernie Knee
- CAS-672 Leo Addeo And His Orchestra Great Standards With A Hawaiian Touch (LP)
- CAS-675 Living Strings & Living Voices : George Gershwin Living Strings & Living Voices In Music Of George Gershwin (LP)
- CAS-680 (e) Hank Snow The Southern Cannonball (LP) 1961
- CAS-686 Jim Reeves The Country Side Of Jim Reeves (LP, Album) 1962
- CAS-687 Living Strings Plus Two Pianos Play The Most Beautiful Music In The World (LP, Album) 1962
- CAS-688 Living Strings Sunrise Serenade - A String Salute To Glenn Miller (LP, Album) 1962
- CAS-707 (e) Homer And Jethro Homer & Jethro Strike Back (LP, Album, Comp) 1962
- CAS-716 Living Strings Play "Tennessee Waltz" and Other Country Favorites (LP, Album) 1962
- CAS-722 (e) Hank Snow - The One And Only Hank Snow (LP, RE) 1962
- CAS-725 Living Voices Sing Christmas Music
- CAS-727 (e) Pete Fountain Dixieland - Live Performance In New Orleans (LP) 1962
- CAS-729 Hugo Montenegro & His Orchestra* In A Sentimental Mood (LP, Album) 1962
- CAS-736 Living Strings Play Henry Mancini (LP) 1963
- CAS-741 (e) Eddy Arnold Country Songs I Love To Sing (LP, Album) 1963
- CAS-748 Living Voices Living Voices Sing Ramblin' Rose And Other Hits (LP, Album) 1963
- CAS-751 The Great Glenn Miller and His Orchestra
- CAS-753 Chet Atkins The Guitar Genius (LP, Album) 1963
- CAS-759 Leo Addeo And His Orchestra Songs Of Hawaii (LP, Album)
- CAS-766 Living Guitars The Big Guitar Sound (Album) ? (2 versions) 1963
- CAS-781 The Greatest! Stars and Songs
- CAS-782 (e) Hank Snow - The Last Ride (LP) 1963
- CAS-793 (e) Various The Country Stars! The Country Hits! (LP, Comp) 1964
- CAS-798 (e) Eddy Arnold Eddy's Songs (LP, Ele) 1964
- CAS-805 (e) Perry Como Love Makes The World Go 'Round (LP)
- CAS-807 Leo Addeo Calypso And Other Island Favorites (LP) 1964
- CAS-818 (e) Skeeter Davis I Forgot More Than You'll Ever Know (LP, Album) 1964
- CAS-825 Boots Randolph The Yakin' Sax Man (LP, Album) 1964
- CAS-827 Living Guitars Music From the Pink Panther and Other Hits (LP, Album) 1964
- CAS-842 Jim Reeves: Have I Told You Lately That I Love You?
- CAS-844 Living Guitars Shindig (LP, Album) 1964
- CAS-845 Bob Ralston (2) All Time Organ Favorites (5xLP + Box) 1972
- CAS-848 Living Jazz The Girl From Ipanema And Other Hits (LP, Album) 1964
- CAS-864 Living Strings Everybody Loves Somebody (LP) 1965
- CAS-869 Living Strings Music From "The Sound Of Music" (LP, Album) 1965
- CAS-872 (e) Benny Goodman And His Orchestra Featuring Great Vocalists Of Our Times (LP) 1965
- CAS-882 (e) Oscar Peterson / Erroll Garner / Art Tatum Great Jazz Pianists (LP, Comp) 1965
- CAS-883 Johnny Douglas And His Orchestra Dance Party Discothèque (LP, Mono) 1965
- CAS-896 Bob Ralston (2) Red Roses For A Blue Lady (LP) 1965
- CAS-897 (e) Eddy Arnold I'm Throwing Rice (At The Girl I Love) (LP, Album) 1965
- CAS-899 Skeeter Davis Blueberry Hill And Other Favorites (LP) 1965
- CAS-902 Living Strings And Living Voices "Mona Lisa" And Other Memorable Songs (LP) 1965
- CAS-903 Roger Miller The One And Only (LP, Album) 1965
- CAS-910 (e) Hank Snow "The Highest Bidder" And Other Favorites (LP, Album) 1965
- CAS-911 Living Voices The Little Drummer Boy (LP) 1965
- CAS-914 Living Jazz Quiet Nights (12") 1965
- CAS-915 Living Strings Three O'Clock In The Morning And Other Love Songs (LP) 1965
- CAS-917 Bob Ralston (2) 22 All-Time Organ Favorites (LP, Album) 1966
- CAS-926 Living Strings: "The Sweetheart Tree" and Other Film Favorites
- CAS-928 Henry Mancini The Second Time Around And Others (LP) 1966
- CAS-930 Living Strings Twilight Time (LP) 1966
- CAS-939 (e) Dennis Day My Wild Irish Rose (LP, Comp) 1966
- CAS-941 (e) Perry Como No Other Love (LP) 1966
- CAS-949 Living Brass A Taste Of Honey And Other Favorites (LP) 1966
- CAS-950 (e) Frankie Carle Great Honky Tonk Piano Favorites (LP, Album) 1966
- CAS-961 Living Marimbas Tijuana Taxi (LP, Album) 1966
- CAS-962 Living Strings Marie (LP) 1966
- CAS-975 George Beverly Shea The Ten Commandments And The Wonderful Life Of Moses In Story And Song (LP) 1966
- CAS-977 Leo Addeo And His Orchestra Musical Orchids From Hawaii (LP, Album)
- CAS-981 Chet Atkins Music From Nashville My Home Town (Vinyl, Album) 1966
- CAS-982 Living Strings: "Make the World Go Away" and Other Country Favorites
- CAS-983 John Gary The One And Only (LP, Album) 1966
- CAS-985 Living Jazz: A Lover's Concerto
- CAS-988 Living Strings Living Strings Play Music From The Motion Picture "Camelot"
- CAS-1003 (e) Dorothy Olsen with Marty Gold Orchestra: Lullabies For Sleepyheads
- CAS-1030 (e) Dorothy Olsen: Songs About Animals and Birds For Children
- CAS-1035 Marvin Miller: Dr. Seuss Presents Yertle the Turtle, Bartholomew and the Oobleck, and Other Stories (LP, Album) (originally released in 1959 by RCA Bluebird Children’s Records)
- CAS-1051 Marvin Miller: Dr. Seuss presents Horton Hatches the Egg and ‘The Sneetches’ and Other Stories (originally released in 1964 by RCA Victor)
- CAS-1063 Marvin Miller: Dr. Seuss presents Fox in Socks and Green Eggs and Ham, 1965
- CAS-1068 (e) Various Rudolph The Red-Nosed Reindeer (Album) ? (2 versions) 1965
- CAS-1078 Marvin Miller: Dr. Seuss presents If I Ran the Zoo/Dr. Seuss' Sleep Book (LP, Album), 1966
- CAS-1079 Rosemary Rice And Children's Chorus (2) The Wonderful World Of Children's Songs (LP) 1967
- CAS-1088 Richard Wolfe Children's Chorus, The Puff The Magic Dragon And Other Songs Children Request (LP, Comp) 1967
- CAS-1091 Richard Wolfe Children's Chorus, The Big Hits For Little People (LP, Comp) 1967
- CAS-1093 Richard Wolfe Children's Chorus, The Teddy Bear's Picnic And Other Children's Favorites (LP, Album) 1967
- CAS-1095 Dr. Seuss presents The Cat in the Hat Songbook, 1967
- CAS 1101 'Twas The Night Before Christmas - The Sugar Plum Fairy And Cast (LP, Album) 1968
- CAS-1122 Shepherd's Children's Chorus, The Songs From The Motion Picture Pufnstuf and Other Children's Favorites (LP) 1970
- CAS-2105 Living Marimbas Latin Soul (LP)
- CAS-2118 (e) Frankie Carle Cocktail Time With Frankie Carle (LP, Album) 1967
- CAS-2132 Megaphones, The (2) And Mikes, The Heartbreak Hotel (LP) 1967
- CAS-2133 Living Strings Music From Doctor Zhivago And Other Motion Pictures (LP) 1967
- CAS-2134 Leo Addeo And His Orchestra Love Is A Hurtin' Thing (LP, Album) 1967
- CAS-2136 (e) Various Country Stars Sing Sacred Songs (LP) 1967
- CAS-2138 Al Hirt Struttin' Down Royal Street (LP) 1967
- CAS-2142 Browns, The (3) Sing The Big Ones From The Country (LP, Album) 1967
- CAS-2148 Living Strings I'm A Believer And Other Monkees' Hits (LP, Album) 1966
- CAS-2149 Living Marimbas Georgy Girl And Other Music To Watch Girls By (LP, Album) 1967
- CAS-2152 Floyd Cramer Night Train (LP, Album) 1967
- CAS-2158 Mancini* - Henry Mancini And His Orchestra Mancini Plays Mancini (And Other Composers) (LP, Album) 1967
- CAS-2159 Living Trio With Chimes And Bells* I'll Be Home For Christmas (LP) 1967
- CAS-2161 Living Strings Living Strings Play Music From Gone With The Wind And Other Motion Pictures (LP) 1967
- CAS-2174 (e) George Beverly Shea Ivory Palaces (LP) 1967
- CAS-2181 Ray Martin And His Orchestra Up Up And Away (LP, Album) 1967
- CAS-2182 Chet Atkins Chet (Album, Comp) ? (2 versions) 1967
- CAS-2183 Waylon Jennings The One And Only Waylon Jennings (LP, Album) 1967
- CAS-2184 Living Marimbas Tonight Carmen And Other Country Favorites (LP) 1967
- CAS-2191 Porter Wagoner Green, Green Grass Of Home (LP)
- CAS-2192 Living Guitars San Franciscan Nights ? (2 versions) 1968
- CAS-2196 Living Jazz An Ode To Young Lovers (LP, Album) 1968
- CAS-2201 (e) Perry Como You Are Never Far Away (LP, Album) 1968
- CAS-2207 (e) Glenn Miller The One And Only (LP) 1968
- CAS-2209 Anita Kerr Singers, The Georgia On My Mind
- CAS-2211 Leo Addeo Mágico Hawaii (LP) 1968
- CAS-2211 Leo Addeo The Magic Of Hawaii (LP, Album)
- CAS-2213 King Keoni And His Islanders This Is Hawaii (LP, Album)
- CAS-2218 Norma Jean (2) Heaven Help The Working Girl (LP, Album) 1968
- CAS-2221 Living Marimbas The Glory of Love (LP, Album)
- CAS-2224 Willy Marambio After Midnight (LP, Album) 1968
- CAS-2228 Peter Nero If Ever I Would Leave You (LP) 1968
- CAS-2229 Organ Masters, The Charmaine And Other Beautiful Organ Songs (LP) 1968
- CAS-2239 Soul Finders, The Soul Man (LP) 1968
- CAS-2242 (e) King Curtis Sax In Motion (LP, Album) 1968
- CAS-2253 Living Marimbas Love Is Blue (LP) 1968
- CAS-2257 (e) Hank Snow My Nova Scotia Home (LP, Album) 1968
- CAS-2263 Living Strings Finian's Rainbow (LP) 1968
- CAS-2283 Living Marimbas Plus Strings MacArthur Park And Other Favorites (LP) 1968
- CAS-2290 Bobby Bare Folsom Prison Blues (LP, Album) 1968
- CAS-2293 Wendy Dawn Haper Valley PTA (LP) 1969
- CAS-2296 Chet Atkins Relaxin' With Chet (LP, Album) 1969
- CAS-2299 (e) Perry Como The Lord's Prayer (LP) 1969
- CAS-2304 Elvis Presley: Elvis Sings "Flaming Star"
- CAS-2310 (e) Charlie Monroe Who's Calling You Sweetheart Tonight (LP) 1969
- CAS-2319 Living Strings / Living Voices, The* Academy Award Winning Songs Of The Present And Past (LP) 1969
- CAS-2323 Living Brass Music From The Graduate And Other Simon And Garfunkel Hits (LP) 1969
- CAS-2331 (e) Paul Mickelson The Love Of God (LP) 1969
- CAS-2332 Living Guitars: The Joy of Christmas (LP) 1969
- CAS-2339 Bonnie Guitar Night Train To Memphis (LP) 1969
- CAS-2340 Living Trio: Love Theme from "Romeo and Juliet"
- CAS-2342 Unknown Artist Listen To Your Stars - An Astrological Guide To Your Horoscope (LP) 1969
- CAS-2346 Living Brass Play Songs Made Famous By Tom Jones (LP, Album) 1969
- CAS-2364 Living Strings Play Music From Popi And Other Cinema Gems (LP, Comp) 1969
- CAS-2367 Skeeter Davis Easy To Love (LP, Album) 1970
- CAS-2377 Living Voices Living Voices Sing "True Girl"/"Jean" And Other Motion Picture Favorites (LP) 1970
- CAS-2378 Alan Blackie Schackner* with the New Group The Electronic Harmonica (12") 1970
- CAS-2398 Various Switched-On-Country (LP, Album)
- CAS-2400 Living Marimbas Raindrops Keep Fallin' On My Head And Other Bacharach/David Hits (LP) 1970
- CAS-2404 Barney Kessel Guitarra (Album) ? (2 versions) 1970
- CAS-2408 Elvis Presley: Let's Be Friends
- CAS-2416 Peter Nero Peter Nero! (LP, Album, RE)
- CAS-2420 Living Strings Airport Love Theme And Other Motion Picture Themes (LP, Album) 1970
- CAS-2421 Living Strings Darling Lili (LP) 1970
- CAS-2425 Living Guitars Let It Be And Other Hits (LP) 1970
- CAS-2426 Living Strings The Sound Of Christmas (LP, Album) 1970
- CAS-2432 Living Marimbas Sugar, Sugar (LP, Album) 1970
- CAS-2434 John Manolesco John Manolesco's Astrology Guide For Aries (LP) 1970
- CAS-2436 Living Jazz Hot Butter & Soul (LP) 1970
- CAS-2437 Living Trio Come Saturday Morning
- CAS-2440 Elvis Presley: Almost in Love
- CAS-2447 Hank Locklin Candy Kisses (LP, Album) 1970
- CAS-2505 Living Strings Nostalgia (LP) 1971
- CAS-2510 Henry Mancini And His Orchestra Dream Of You (LP, Album) 1971
- CAS-2518 Elvis Presley C'mon Everybody (LP)
- CAS-2521 Living Guitars Living Guitars Play Songs Made Famous By The Rolling Stones (Album)
- CAS-2532 Jim Reeves Young And Country (LP, Comp) 1971
- CAS-2533 Elvis Presley I Got Lucky (LP, Album, Comp) 1971
- CAS-2547 Perry Como The Shadow Of Your Smile (LP) 1972
- CAS-2549 Jim Ed Brown Country Cream (LP, Album) 1972
- CAS-2555 Chet Atkins Nashville Gold (LP, Album) 1972
- CAS-2563 Jose Feliciano* Sings (LP, Album) 1972
- CAS-2566 George Carlin Take-Offs & Put-Ons (reissue of RCA Victor LSP-3772)
- CAS-2567 Elvis Presley: Elvis Sings Hits from His Movies, Volume 1-
- CAS-2573 Al Hirt Have A Merry Little (LP, Album) 1972
- CAS-2576 Dick Nolan (2) Fisherman's Boy (LP, alb) 1972
- CAS-2584 Charley Pride The Incomparable Charley Pride (LP, RM) 1972
- CAS-2591 George Jones (2) Flowers For Mama
- CAS-2595 Elvis Presley: Burning Love and Hits from His Movies, Volume 2
- CAS-2599 Harry Belafonte Harry Belafonte (LP, Album) 1973
- CAS-2600 Chet Atkins Finger Pickin' Good (LP, Album, RM) 1972
- CAS-2606 Living Strings Man Of La Mancha (LP) 1973
- CAS-2608 Waylon Jennings Ruby, Don't Take Your Love To Town (LP, Album) 1973
- CAS-2611 Elvis Presley Separate Ways (Album) ? (2 versions) 1972
