= Heartaches by the Number (disambiguation) =

Heartaches by the Number may refer to:

- "Heartaches by the Number", a 1959 popular country music song
- Heartaches by the Number (Waylon Jennings album)
- Heartaches by the Number (David Ball album)
