= Touch Your Woman =

Studio album by Dolly Parton
- Released: March 6, 1972
- Recorded: October 30, 1969–January 12, 1972
- Studio: RCA Studio B (Nashville)
- Genre: Country
- Length: 25:21
- Label: RCA Victor
- Producer: Bob Ferguson

Dolly Parton chronology
| The Right Combination • Burning the Midnight Oil (1972) | Touch Your Woman (1972) | Together Always (1972) |

Singles from Touch Your Woman
- 1. "Touch Your Woman" Released: February 14, 1972

Touch Your Woman is the ninth solo studio album by American singer-songwriter Dolly Parton. It was released on March 6, 1972, by RCA Victor. The album's title song and single, "Touch Your Woman", was nominated for a Grammy.

The album was released as a digital download on October 10, 2014.

== Critical reception ==
Professional ratings
Review scores
| Source | Rating |
|---|---|
| AllMusic | 4/5 stars |

The review published by Billboard in the March 18, 1972 issue said, "Miss Parton is currently enjoying a highly successful career and this LP will take her higher up the ladder as both a fine stylist and a superb songwriter. Produced by Bob Ferguson, this terrific package is a showcase for the beautiful voice and writing talent of the lovely country girl. "Second Best", "Will He Be Waiting", "A Little at a Time", and the title tune, all penned by Miss Parton are highlights."

Cashbox published a review in the March 11, 1972 issue, which said, "Dolly Parton has a unique voice, partly because of its tone and partly because of the emotion she places behind her singing. On this LP of ten new cuts, she reaches new heights of emotion in both her singing and songwriting. Sticking to pure country music roots as far as song structure goes, Dolly however, shows a very progressive attitude when it comes to writing lyrics in tunes such as "The Greatest Days of All", "Second Best", "Will He Be Waiting", and "Mission Chapel Memories", the latter which was co-written with Porter Wagoner."

== Commercial performance ==
The album peaked at No. 19 on the US Billboard Hot Country LP's chart.

The album's single, "Touch Your Woman", was released in February 1972 and peaked at No. 6 on the US Billboard Hot Country Singles chart and No. 28 in Canada on the RPM Country Singles chart.

== Accolades ==
The album's title track and single, "Touch Your Woman", was nominated for Best Country Vocal Performance, Female, at the 15th Annual Grammy Awards.

== Recording ==
Recording session for the album began at RCA Studio B in Nashville, Tennessee, on December 14, 1971. Two additional sessions followed on January 1 and 12, 1972. "Love Isn't Free" was recorded during the October 30, 1969 session for 1969's The Fairest of Them All.

== Track listing ==
All tracks written by Dolly Parton, except where noted.

Side one
| No. | Title | Recording date | Length |
|---|---|---|---|
| 1. | "Will He Be Waiting?" | December 14, 1971 | 2:31 |
| 2. | "The Greatest Days of All" | December 14, 1971 | 2:41 |
| 3. | "Touch Your Woman" | December 14, 1971 | 2:43 |
| 4. | "A Lot of You Left in Me" | January 1, 1972 | 2:31 |
| 5. | "Second Best" | January 12, 1972 | 2:57 |

Side two
| No. | Title | Writer(s) | Recording date | Length |
|---|---|---|---|---|
| 1. | "A Little at a Time" | | January 1, 1972 | 2:14 |
| 2. | "Love Is Only as Strong (As Your Weakest Moment)" | Bill Owens | January 12, 1972 | 2:05 |
| 3. | "Love Isn't Free" | | October 30, 1969 | 2:34 |
| 4. | "Mission Chapel Memories" | Parton; Porter Wagoner | January 1, 1972 | 3:09 |
| 5. | "Loneliness Found Me" | Wagoner | December 14, 1971 | 1:56 |

== Personnel ==
Adapted from the album liner notes.

- Bobby Denton – liner notes
- Bob Ferguson – producer
- Les Leverett – cover photo
- Al Pachucki – recording engineer
- Dolly Parton – lead vocals
- Tom Pick – recording engineer
- Mike Shockley – recording technician
- Roy Shockley – recording technician

== Charts ==
Album

| Chart (1972) | Peak position |
|---|---|
| US Hot Country LP's (Billboard) | 19 |
| US Cashbox Country Albums | 16 |

Singles

| Title | Year | Peak position | |
| Title | Year | US Country | CAN Country |
|---|---|---|---|
| "Touch Your Woman" | 1972 | 6 | 28 |

== Release history ==
| Region | Date | Format | Label | Ref. |
|---|---|---|---|---|
| Various | March 6, 1972 | LP; 8-track | RCA Victor | |
| Various | October 10, 2014 | Digital download | Sony; Legacy | |
