= Ethel Gabriel =

American record producer (1921–2021)

- Born: Ethel Nagy Gabriel; November 16, 1921; Milmont Park, Pennsylvania, U.S.
- Died: March 23, 2021 (aged 99) Rochester, New York, U.S.
- Occupations: Record producer, record executive
- Labels: RCA Victor; RCA Camden

Ethel Nagy Gabriel (November 16, 1921 – March 23, 2021) was an American record producer and record executive with a four-decade career at RCA Victor. She produced over 2,500 music albums including 15 RIAA Certified Gold Records and hits by Elvis Presley, Perry Como, Al Hirt, Henry Mancini, and Roger Whittaker, among many others.

She was the first female record producer for a major label and the first female A&R producer in the industry. Gabriel was the winner of a Grammy Award in 1982 and also produced several Grammy-winning albums.

== Personal life ==
Gabriel was born in November 1921, and grew up in a Philadelphia suburb. She was the youngest of five daughters born to Hungarian parents. She played trombone and started her own dance band at the age of 13. They played Glenn Miller arrangements. Her band played for troops at USO functions during off-duty hours. Gabriel was a trombonist in the Philadelphia Women's Symphony Orchestra from 1939 to 1940. She studied with Donald Reinhardt in Philadelphia and New York.

Gabriel graduated in 1943 from Temple University, where she studied music education. In 1940, Gabriel began her employment at RCA Victor in Camden, New Jersey while still in school to help pay tuition and living expenses. She also took some music and conducting courses at Columbia University between 1945 and 1948.

She spent most of her career based in New York City but traveled the world through her work with RCA Victor. She was the wife of Gus Gabriel, President of Dunhill Publishing Company (New York City). When Gus Gabriel was hospitalized, Frank Sinatra sent autographed photos to all of the nurses to make sure he got the best care.

Gabriel previously resided in the Poconos region of Pennsylvania in a home she designed herself before moving to Rochester, New York to be closer to family, as she had no children.

Gabriel died in Rochester, New York in March, 2021 at the age of 99.

== Career at RCA Victor ==
In 1940, a relative helped Gabriel gain employment at the RCA Victor plant in Camden, New Jersey. She began as a "finisher" working evenings. Her tasks were to affix labels to records, pack records for shipment and various secretarial duties. She was then promoted to quality control as a record tester. Her job was to listen to one out of every 500 records for sound quality, check the label was correct and that the record had no scratches. She learned a lot about hit records, having had to listen to so many different styles and types of music.

The recording studios at RCA Victor were nearby so Gabriel brought her trombone to work. She would watch recording sessions and practice between sessions when she could. Gabriel became secretary to Herman Diaz Jr., manager of RCA Victor's A&R department. She "practically lived at the sound studios" where she learned by listening and watching others work.

=== Record producer ===
Around 1959, Gabriel became head of the RCA Camden budget reissue label which was in danger of folding. Gabriel suspected that her boss, who was not in favor of women in the record industry, put her in charge of the moribund Camden label as a way to possibly force her out of RCA Victor. Gabriel went on to rejuvenate the Camden label and transform it within just a few years, into a multimillion-dollar label.

Gabriel was transferred from Camden, New Jersey to New York City to work for RCA Victor's educational and international record department. She commented she learned everything on her own because her boss enjoyed going out on the road and left the work to her.

Gabriel convinced RCA Victor's vice-president, Manie Sacks, to sign Perez Prado to RCA Victor in the U.S. (most of Prado's earlier records were recorded in Mexico City for RCA Victor's Mexican division) and she produced Prado's biggest hit record "Cherry Pink and Apple Blossom White." The tune topped the charts for 10 weeks in 1955 and helped fire the Mambo craze in the United States.

==== Living Series ====
In 1959, Gabriel created the RCA Camden "Living Strings" series of albums, which were easy listening instrumental string versions of popular tunes, earning a Grammy Award in 1968. Living Strings proved to be a popular series and enjoyed a 22-year run. Their popularity spawned other "Living" ventures, such as the Living Jazz, Living Voices, Living Guitars, and Living Brass. Gabriel was also involved with the production of George Melachrino's "Music for Moods" series that yielded the titles Music for Dining, Music for Daydreaming, Music for Faith and Inner Calm, and Music to Stop Smoking By.

=== A&R representative ===
Gabriel served as the A&R representative for several popular RCA Victor recording artists such as Perry Como, Cleo Laine, and Roger Whittaker. Gabriel also produced recordings by Elvis Presley, Dolly Parton, Jim Reeves, Eddy Arnold, Henry Mancini, Harry Belafonte, Perez Prado, The Ames Brothers, Eddie Fisher, Jaye P. Morgan, Hugo Winterhalter, Henri René, The Three Suns, Mario Lanza, Arthur Fiedler and The Boston Pops Orchestra, Peter Nero, Sergio Franchi, Neil Sedaka, Paul Anka, Norma Jean, The Limeliters, Wilf "Montana Slim" Carter, Lana Cantrell, John Gary and several others, achieving top record sales for several of these artists.

Gabriel became vice-president in 1982 of Pop Contemporary A&R. She was the first woman at RCA Records to achieve a vice-president title.

=== Accomplishments ===
At RCA Victor, Gabriel was on the ground floor of the creation of the company's famous Nashville studios. She was a leader in the experiments and methods of electronically improving and influencing the sound of music, such as simulating the first stereo sounds (by shifting sound between speakers) and experimenting with the use of an echo chamber. She supervised the first stereo recording with Bing Crosby.

Gabriel was involved with RCA's earliest disco record release, The Brothers Disco-Soul in 1975. During the 1970s, Gabriel was the producer of the best-selling RCA Pure Gold and A Legendary Performer reissue series of albums. She was also executive producer of the first digitally-remastered album ever issued, Caruso: A Legendary Performer, issued in 1976 on the RCA Red Seal label, which was also the first collection of acoustic recordings to utilize the computer restoration process developed by Thomas Stockham of Soundstream.

In an interview with the New York Times in 1983, Gabriel said that the role of a record producer had changed. When she began her career, producers could propose which artists they wanted to record, the general concept and the recording itself. By the end of her career, those had mostly become corporate decisions. The producer was responsible for the budget, selection of material (determined with the artist), and details such as the album cover art.

In 1984, Gabriel retired from RCA Records after 44 years with the label.

== Later career ==
In the late 1980s and 90s, Gabriel was president of JazzMania records, Vice President of Jade Panther Productions, and President of Aurora Records. She co-produced off-Broadway plays such as The Aunts in 1989 and A Cast of Hawks.

=== Victim of retirement fraud ===
In 1984, Gabriel gave her entire RCA retirement ($251,485.92) to a friend, former United States Treasury Secretary Robert B. Anderson, to form a new recording company. In 1987, Anderson was sent to prison for bank fraud. Having lost her entire life's savings, Gabriel's memorabilia from her career with RCA Victor was put up for auction in Pennsylvania in 2007. She later discovered her Gold Record Awards had unintentionally been auctioned (including those with Sinatra and Presley). Her nephew, Ed Mauro, managed to have some of her Gold Record awards recreated.

== Awards and accolades ==
Gabriel was nominated for a Grammy Award in 1967 and won a 1983 Grammy Award in the Best Historical Album category for The Tommy Dorsey/Frank Sinatra Sessions - Vols. 1, 2 & 3.

=== Grammy-nominated albums ===
- Living Voices: Wish Me A Rainbow (Best Performance by a Chorus, 1967)
- Living Voices: Angel in the Morning (Best Contemporary Performance by a Chorus, 1969)

Gabriel was on the Governor's Board of the Recording Academy's New York Chapter 1983–1986.

=== Gold records ===
Gabriel produced fifteen gold records out of over twenty-five hundred releases to her credit. Eleven reissues in the RCA Pure Gold series received gold records as well as two platinum. Her Gold Record Awards for RCA included:

- Perry Como Sings Merry Christmas Music (CAS-660(e))
- Henri Mancini - The Pink Panther Soundtrack (ANL1-1389)
- Elvis Presley - Pure Gold (ANL1-0971(e))
- Roger Whittaker - The Last Farewell and Other Hits (AFL1-0853)
- The Best of Roger Whittaker (AFL1-2253)
- Larry Elgart - Hooked On Swing (AFL1-4343)

In 1997, she was honored by Women in Music Inc. at their Touchstone Awards in New York. She was awarded for being "First A&R Producer in the Industry" and for making a difference in the music industry.

In 2014, she was named to the Rochester Music Hall of Fame.
