= Mine (Dolly Parton album) =

Compilation album by Dolly Parton
- Released: September 1973
- Recorded: 1969–1970
- Genre: Country
- Label: RCA Camden
- Producer: Bob Ferguson

Dolly Parton chronology
Bubbling Over (1973)	Mine (1973)	Jolene (1974)

Mine is a 1973 compilation album by American singer-songwriter Dolly Parton, issued on the budget label RCA Camden. As was the case with Parton's 1972 RCA Camden compilation, Just the Way I Am, the album was an attempt by RCA to capitalize on Parton's early 1970s chart success by reissuing some of her lesser known material (in this case, tracks recorded between 1969 and 1970) as a budget release, for newer fans who might not have purchased her earlier albums. The majority of tracks on Mine had first appeared on Parton's 1970 album, The Fairest of Them All.

RCA Camden would issue two more Parton compilations: I Wish I Felt This Way at Home (1975) and Just Because I'm a Woman (not to be confused with Parton's 1968 debut solo RCA Victor album of the same name) (1976); all four of Parton's RCA Camden albums would later be reissued on the Pickwick label during the late 1970s.

== Track listing ==
All songs by Dolly Parton unless otherwise noted.

1. "Mine"
2. "Chas"
3. "When Possession Gets Too Strong" (Parton, Louis Owens)
4. "I'm Doing This For Your Sake"
5. "But You Loved Me Then"
6. "Don't Let It Trouble Your Mind"
7. "More Than Their Share"
8. "Mama Say A Prayer"
9. "Down From Dover"
