= We Found It =

Studio album by Porter Wagoner & Dolly Parton
- Released: February 12, 1973
- Recorded: 1972
- Studio: RCA Studio B (Nashville)
- Genre: Country
- Length: 23:57
- Label: RCA Victor
- Producer: Bob Ferguson

Porter Wagoner & Dolly Parton chronology
Together Always (1972)	We Found It (1973)	Love and Music (1973)

Dolly Parton chronology
My Favorite Songwriter, Porter Wagoner (1972)	We Found It (1973)	My Tennessee Mountain Home (1973)

Singles from We Found It
- 1. "We Found It" Released: February 12, 1973

We Found It is the ninth collaborative studio album by Porter Wagoner and Dolly Parton. It was released on February 12, 1973, by RCA Victor. The album was among their lower charting albums, reaching No. 20 on the U.S. country albums chart, while the title single reached No. 30 on the country singles chart.

== Critical reception ==
Professional ratings
Review scores
Source	Rating
AllMusic	4/5 stars
The Encyclopedia of Popular Music	3/5 stars

Billboard gave a positive review of the album, saying, "It's all original material, written individually and collectively by the pair, and they manage to mix love and happiness into a perfect blending. Some of their best material to date, and that says a great deal." The mentioned "I've Been Married (Just as Long as You Have)", "I Am Always Waiting", and "Sweet Rachel Ann" as the best cuts on the album.

== Recording ==
Recording sessions for the album began at RCA Studio B in Nashville, Tennessee, on April 28, 1972, yielding only two tracks, of which "We Found It" made the final track listing. Two additional sessions followed on August 21 and 22, producing six of the album's tracks between them. The final session took place on November 29, from which two songs were selected to complete the album. One track on the album, "How Close They Must Be", was recorded during the April 7, 1971 session for 1972's The Right Combination • Burning the Midnight Oil.

== Track listing ==
Track listing, writing credits and track length adapted from LP sleeve. All tracks written by Porter Wagoner, except where noted.

Side one
No.	Title	Writer(s)	Recording date	Length
1.	"Love City"	Wagoner; Tom Pick	November 29, 1972	1:58
2.	"Between Us"	Dolly Parton	November 29, 1972	1:47
3.	"We Found It"		April 28, 1972	2:30
4.	"Satan's River"		August 21, 1972	2:35
5.	"I've Been Married (Just as Long as You Have)"	Parton; Wagoner	August 22, 1972	2:44

Side two
No.	Title	Writer(s)	Recording date	Length
1.	"I Am Always Waiting"		August 22, 1972	2:14
2.	"Sweet Rachel Ann"	Parton	August 21, 1972	2:56
3.	"That's When Love Will Mean the Most"		August 21, 1972	1:54
4.	"Love Have Mercy on Us"	Parton	August 21, 1972	2:52
5.	"How Close They Must Be"		April 7, 1971	2:27
