= Studio orchestra =

Orchestra used for recording

A studio orchestra is an orchestra that exists only for the purpose of studio recording. That is, it does not perform in public concerts or for audiences generally. Studio orchestras are typically run by movie and television studios to produce film and television soundtrack recordings. Nearly all easy listening orchestras are studio orchestras. Some famous easy listening studio orchestras are the 101 Strings, the Living Strings, and the Hollyridge Strings. In pop music of the 1960s, studio orchestras were commonly assembled by record producers and songwriters like Phil Spector, Brian Wilson, and Burt Bacharach.

== See also ==
- Orchestral pop
