= Touch Your Woman (song) =

- US reissue single

Single by Dolly Parton

from the album Touch Your Woman
- B-side: "Will He Be Waiting?"
- Released: February 14, 1972
- Recorded: December 14, 1971
- Studio: RCA Studio B (Nashville)
- Genre: Country
- Length: 2:40
- Label: RCA Victor
- Songwriter: Dolly Parton
- Producer: Bob Ferguson

Dolly Parton singles chronology
"Coat of Many Colors" (1971)	"Touch Your Woman" (1972)	"When I Sing for Him" (1972)

"Touch Your Woman" is a song written and originally recorded by American singer-songwriter Dolly Parton. It was released on February 14, 1972 as the only single from the album of the same name. It provided a 1972 top-ten country single for her. A tranquil, slow-tempo ballad, the song differed from many of Parton's other hits at the time, in that it was neither an upbeat, lilting country number, nor a nostalgic reminiscence of her rural childhood. "Touch Your Woman" reached number 6 on the U.S. country singles charts in March 1972, though a number of country radio stations refused to play it because they found it too sexually suggestive. The song earned Parton a Grammy nomination for Best Country Vocal Performance, Female, at the 15th Annual Grammy Awards, losing to Donna Fargo's "The Happiest Girl in the Whole U.S.A."

It has since been included in a number of Parton's compilation albums, including Best of Dolly Parton, The RCA Years, and The Essential Dolly Parton. The B-side "Will He Be Waiting?" was re-recorded for Parton's 1999 bluegrass album, "The Grass Is Blue."

On a list of the 50 best Dolly Parton songs, Rolling Stone magazine ranked "Touch Your Woman" at number 27, calling it "refreshing and soulful."

== Content ==
The lyrics speak of a disagreement between lovers, but concludes with the line "all you have to do to make it right is just touch your woman". Parton has described the song as sexy and intimate, but also innocent and pure, adding "We can't let some little upset make us get bitter and calloused. Let our love build and grow."

== Cover versions ==
The song was covered by Skeeter Davis on her 1972 album "Skeeter Sings Dolly." The song was also covered in late 1972 by R&B artist Margie Joseph, and in 2002 by folk singer Kate Campbell.

== Chart performance ==
Chart (1972)	Peak position
U.S. Billboard Hot Country Singles	6
Canadian RPM Country Tracks	28
