= Just the Way I Am =

Compilation album by Dolly Parton
- Released: September 1972
- Genre: Country
- Label: RCA Camden
- Producer: Bob Ferguson

Dolly Parton chronology
Together Always (1972)	Just the Way I Am (1972)	My Favorite Songwriter, Porter Wagoner (1972)

Just the Way I Am is a 1972 compilation album by the singer-songwriter Dolly Parton. Issued by RCA Records on the budget reissue label RCA Camden, the album was largely made up of previously released material Parton had recorded between 1967 and 1970 and was an attempt to capitalize on Parton's early 1970s success by reissuing earlier recordings that newer fans of Parton might not have been familiar with at the time.

Just the Way I Am and Parton's three subsequent RCA Camden albums were later reissued on the Pickwick label. The album was first reissued on compact disc on RCA Camden in 1996; in 1999, RCA reissued the album on CD again, with alternate cover art.

== Track listing ==
All tracks written by Dolly Parton, except where noted.

1. "Just the Way I Am"
2. "Little Bird"
3. "Mama Say a Prayer"
4. "My Blue Ridge Mountain Boy"
5. "In the Good Old Days (When Times Were Bad)"
6. "In the Ghetto" (Mac Davis)
7. "Daddy Come and Get Me" (Parton, Dorothy Jo Hope)
8. "The Carroll County Accident" (Bob Ferguson)
9. "Gypsy, Joe and Me"
