= Together Always =

Studio album by Porter Wagoner and Dolly Parton
- Released: September 11, 1972
- Recorded: April 7, 1971–May 2, 1972
- Studio: RCA Studio B (Nashville)
- Genre: Country
- Length: 27:25
- Label: RCA Victor
- Producer: Bob Ferguson

Porter Wagoner and Dolly Parton chronology
The Right Combination • Burning the Midnight Oil (1972)	Together Always (1972)	We Found It (1973)

Dolly Parton chronology
Touch Your Woman (1972)	Together Always (1972)	Just the Way I Am (1972)

Singles from Together Always
- 1. "Lost Forever in Your Kiss" Released: March 6, 1972; 2. "Together Always" Released: July 31, 1972

Together Always is the eighth collaborative studio album by Porter Wagoner and Dolly Parton. It was released on September 11, 1972, by RCA Victor.

The album was released as a digital download on January 4, 2019.

== Content ==
The album consists entirely of songs composed by either Parton or Wagoner. It contains their hit "Lost Forever in Your Kiss", in addition to the humorous "Ten Four — Over and Out", which exploited the C.B. radio craze a few years before it became a major phenomenon in the US. "Poor Folks Town" was later recorded as a solo by Parton on her 1980 album, 9 to 5 and Odd Jobs. The album features liner notes written by both Wagoner and Parton in their own handwriting.

== Critical reception ==
Professional ratings
Review scores
Source	Rating
AllMusic	3/5 stars
The Encyclopedia of Popular Music	3/5 stars

The review published in the September 23, 1972 issue of Billboard said, "Two of the most consistent chart winners join forces once again for another top package loaded with programming and sales potency. Duo wrote all the material with highlights that include "Lost Forever in Your Kiss," "Love's All Over", "Ten Four – Over and Out", and of course the current hit single, "Together Always"."

Cashbox published a review in the September 9, 1972 issue, which said, "The time is September, 1982, and the scene is an anniversary party. Porter Wagoner and Dolly Parton are celebrating the tenth anniversary of their "Together Always" album; they are celebrating as proof that the album title was accurate and that they would truly remain a team forever. Maybe this fantasy is projecting too far into the future, but if you hear the closeness of Porter and Dolly's music on their new album, then you would not only agree with me, you would make advance reservations for the 1992 anniversary party! Includes "Lost Forever in Your Kiss", "Poor Folks Town", and "Christina"."

== Commercial performance ==
The album peaked at No. 3 on the US Billboard Hot Country LP's chart, the duo's highest ever placing.

The album's first single, "Lost Forever in Your Kiss", was released in March 1972 and peaked at No. 9 on the US Billboard Hot Country Singles chart. The second single, "Together Always", was released in July 1972 and peaked at No. 14 on the US Billboard Hot Country Singles chart.

== Recording ==
Recording sessions for the album took place on April 28, May 1 and 2, 1972, at RCA Studio B in Nashville, Tennessee. Six of the album's ten tracks were recorded during sessions for 1972's The Right Combination • Burning the Midnight Oil. "Love's All Over", "Take Away" and "You and Me – Her and Him" were recorded on April 7, 1971. "Anyplace You Want to Go", "Looking Down" and "Lost Forever in Your Kiss" were recorded on September 28, 29 and 30, 1971, respectively.

== Track listing ==
All tracks written by Porter Wagoner, except where noted.

Side one
No.	Title	Writer(s)	Recording date	Length
1.	"Together Always"	Dolly Parton	May 1, 1972	2:17
2.	"Love's All Over"		April 7, 1971	3:06
3.	"Christina"	Parton	May 1, 1972	2:59
4.	"Poor Folks Town"	Parton	April 28, 1972	2:41
5.	"Take Away"		April 7, 1971	2:24

Side two
No.	Title	Writer(s)	Recording date	Length
1.	"Ten Four – Over and Out"		May 2, 1972	3:29
2.	"Lost Forever in Your Kiss"	Parton	September 30, 1971	3:20
3.	"Anyplace You Want to Go"		September 28, 1971	2:15
4.	"Looking Down"		September 29, 1971	2:33
5.	"You and Me – Her and Him"		April 7, 1971	2:21

== Personnel ==
Adapted from the album liner notes and RCA recording session records.

- Joseph Babcock – backing vocals
- Jerry Carrigan – drums
- Pete Drake – steel
- Bobby Dyson – bass
- Dolores Edgin – backing vocals
- Johnny Gimble – fiddle
- Dave Kirby – guitar
- Les Leverett – cover photo
- Mack Magaha – fiddle
- George McCormick – rhythm guitar
- June Evelyn Page – backing vocals
- Dolly Parton – lead vocals, liner notes
- Tom Pick – recording engineer
- Hargus Robbins – piano
- Billy Sanford – guitar
- Dale Sellers – guitar
- Roy Shockley – recording technician
- Jerry Shook – guitar
- Buddy Spicher – fiddle
- Jerry Stembridge – guitar
- Robert Thompson – guitar
- Buck Trent – electric banjo
- Porter Wagoner – lead vocals, liner notes

== Charts ==
Album

Chart (1972)	Peak position
US Hot Country LP's (Billboard)	3

Singles

Title	Year	Peak position
Title	Year	US Country
"Lost Forever in Your Kiss"	1972	9
"Together Always"	1972	14

== Release history ==
Region	Date	Format	Label	Ref.
Various	September 11, 1972	LP; 8-track	RCA Victor	
Various	January 4, 2019	Digital download	RCA; Sony; Legacy	
