= Living Strings =

Studio orchestra founded in 1959

The Living Strings were a studio orchestra founded in 1959 by RCA Victor for a series of easy listening recordings issued on the RCA Camden budget label. There were also related groups called the Living Voices, Living Brass, Living Guitars, Living Marimbas, Living Jazz, Living Trio, Living Percussion, and Living Organ.

RCA Victor record producer Ethel Gabriel created the "Living Strings" series of albums, which were easy-listening instrumental string versions of popular tunes, the type of music that came to be known pejoratively as elevator music.

There was no actual orchestra known as the Living Strings. The orchestra for most of the recordings was made up of musicians from various British orchestras assembled for the purpose of making the records. (Johnny Douglas was a frequent conductor and arranger.) In addition to the standard Hollywood, Nashville or New York sessions, some LPs were recorded in other countries (Mexico, England, Germany etc).

The first Living Strings release was Living Strings Play Music of the Sea, which was arranged and conducted by Douglas. Another of the Living Strings albums he did, Feelings, went RIAA Gold. The Living Strings won a Grammy Award in 1968.
