= Jolene (album) =

Studio album by Dolly Parton
- Released: February 4, 1974
- Recorded: January 12, 1972–December 26, 1973
- Studios: RCA Studio B, Nashville
- Genre: Country
- Length: 25:08
- Label: RCA Victor
- Producer: Bob Ferguson

Dolly Parton chronology
Mine (1973)	Jolene (1974)	Porter 'n' Dolly (1974)

Singles from Jolene
- 1. "Jolene" Released: October 15, 1973; 2. "I Will Always Love You" Released: March 11, 1974

Jolene is the thirteenth solo studio album by American entertainer Dolly Parton. It was released on February 4, 1974, by RCA Victor. The title track, "Jolene", is in the voice of a woman confronting a beautiful seductress who she believes is having an affair with her husband. It became Parton's second solo number-one country single; it also was a moderate pop hit for her, and also did well in the United Kingdom. Since the introduction of downloads to the Official Chart in 2005, it has amassed 255,300 downloads and 6.68 million streams. It has been covered by numerous performers.

The album was released around the time Parton was embarking on a solo career, after having spent seven years as part of Porter Wagoner's weekly TV series and road show, and one of the album's songs, "I Will Always Love You", was reportedly written to express Parton's feelings over the end of their professional relationship. Released as the album's second single, it also became a number-one country single.

"Early Morning Breeze" is a re-recording of a song which previously appeared on 1971's Coat of Many Colors. "Lonely Coming Down" had first appeared on Parton's Wagoner tribute album, My Favorite Songwriter, Porter Wagoner, from 1972.

Another re-issue was released in conjunction with Dolly's 2007 European Tour along with two other older out-of-print albums. This re-issue included additional previously unreleased songs.

In 2010, Sony Music reissued the 2007 CD Jolene in a triple-feature CD set with Coat of Many Colors and My Tennessee Mountain Home and they have never been out of print.

== Critical reception ==
Professional ratings
Review scores
Source	Rating
AllMusic	3.5/5 stars
Christgau's Record Guide	B−
The Encyclopedia of Popular Music	4/5 stars
Music Box	3.5/5 stars
Pitchfork	5.8/10
Uncut	5/5 stars

A positive review of the album by Billboard said, "With the title taken from her latest hit single, Dolly goes about recording a whole bunch of others—hits, that is. There are perhaps five or six here which could stand on their own, including the exceptional ballad, 'Lonely Coming Down'. Most of the writing is her own, as usual, and that's always a plus."

== Track listing ==
All tracks are written by Dolly Parton, except where noted.

Side one
No.	Title	Recording date	Length
1.	"Jolene"	May 22, 1973	2:43
2.	"When Someone Wants to Leave"	December 26, 1973	2:06
3.	"River of Happiness"	December 26, 1973	2:19
4.	"Early Morning Breeze"	December 26, 1973	2:45
5.	"Highlight of My Life"	December 3, 1973	2:18

Side two
No.	Title	Writer(s)	Recording date	Length
6.	"I Will Always Love You"		June 12, 1973	2:56
7.	"Randy"		December 26, 1973	1:53
8.	"Living on Memories of You"		December 26, 1973	2:47
9.	"Lonely Comin' Down"	Porter Wagoner	May 3, 1972	3:13
10.	"It Must Be You"	Blaise Tosti	January 12, 1972	1:52

2007 CD Reissue
No.	Title	Recording date	Length
11.	"Cracker Jack"	June 12, 1973	3:17
12.	"Another Woman's Man"	May 22, 1973	3:01
13.	"Barbara on Your Mind"	June 12, 1973	3:14
14.	"Last Night's Lovin'"	June 12, 1973	2:28

== Personnel ==
- Dolly Parton – vocals, guitar
- Jimmy Colvard – guitar
- Dave Kirby – guitar
- Bobby Thompson – guitar
- Chip Young – guitar
- Pete Drake – pedal steel guitar
- Stu Basore – pedal steel guitar
- Bobby Dyson – bass
- Jerry Carrigan – drums
- Larrie Londin – drums
- Kenny Malone – drums
- Buck Trent – banjo
- Mack Magaha – fiddle
- Johnny Gimble – fiddle
- Hargus "Pig" Robbins – piano
- David Briggs – piano
- Onie Wheeler – harmonica
- The Nashville Edition – background vocals

== Charts ==
=== Weekly charts ===
Chart (1974)	Peak position
US Hot Country Albums (Billboard)	6
US Cashbox Country Albums	3

Chart (2022)	Peak position
UK Country Albums (Official Charts)	11

Chart (2026)	Peak position
Danish Albums (Hitlisten)	18
Dutch Albums (Album Top 100)	29
Norwegian Albums (IFPI Norge)	42
Swedish Albums (Sverigetopplistan)	10

=== Year-end charts ===
Chart (1974)	Position
US Hot Country Albums (Billboard)	35

== Certifications ==
Region	Certification	Certified units/sales
Australia (ARIA)	3× Platinum	210,000^{‡}
New Zealand (RMNZ)	Gold	7,500^{‡}
United States (RIAA)	Gold	500,000^{‡}
^{‡} Sales+streaming figures based on certification alone.
