= Coat of Many Colors (song) =

1971 single by Dolly Parton

Single by Dolly Parton

from the album Coat of Many Colors
- B-side: "She Never Met a Man (She Didn't Like)"
- Released: September 27, 1971
- Recorded: April 1971
- Studio: RCA Studio B, Nashville
- Genre: Country
- Length: 3:05
- Label: RCA Victor
- Songwriter: Dolly Parton
- Producer: Bob Ferguson

Dolly Parton singles chronology
"Joshua" (1971)	"Coat of Many Colors" (1971)	"Touch Your Woman" (1972)

Official audio
- "Coat of Many Colors" on YouTube

"Coat of Many Colors" is a song written and recorded by American country music singer Dolly Parton. It was released in September 1971 as the second single and title track from the album Coat of Many Colors.

== Background ==
Parton composed the song in 1969, while traveling with Porter Wagoner on a tour bus. She explained in her 1994 memoir, My Life and Other Unfinished Business, because she could find no paper, as the song came to her, she wrote it on the back of a dry cleaning receipt from one of Wagoner's suits; when the song became a hit, Wagoner had the receipt framed. She recorded the song in April 1971, making it the title song for her Coat of Many Colors album. The song reached #4 on the U.S. country singles charts.

Parton performed this song in April 1970, and was recorded for her album A Real Live Dolly, though it wasn't released in the album. It was released as a bonus track on Parton's career-spanning box set Dolly in October 2009.

== Content ==
The song tells of how Parton's mother stitched together a coat for her daughter out of rags given to the family. As she sewed, she told her child the biblical story of Joseph and his coat of many colors. The excited child, "with patches on my britches and holes in both my shoes", rushed to school, "just to find the others laughing and making fun of me" for wearing a coat made of rags.

And oh I could not understand it, for I felt I was rich
And I told them of the love my momma sewed in every stitch
And I told 'em all the story momma told me while she sewed
And how my coat of many colors was worth more than all their clothes

The song concludes with Parton singing the moral of her story:

But they didn't understand it, and I tried to make them see
One is only poor, only if they choose to be
Now I know we had no money, but I was rich as I could be
In my coat of many colors my momma made for me

Parton has called the song "a world of things" and that "it teaches about bullying, about love, about acceptance, about good parents."

== Missing final verse ==
On the original LP release of the 1975 compilation Best of Dolly Parton, the printed lyrics to the song appeared in the inner gatefold of the album, including a final verse that has not been included on any of Parton's recordings of the song:

Through life I've remained happy and good luck is on my side.
I have everything that anyone could ever want from life.
But nothing is as precious as my mama's memory,
and my coat of many colors that mama made for me.

== Original coat ==
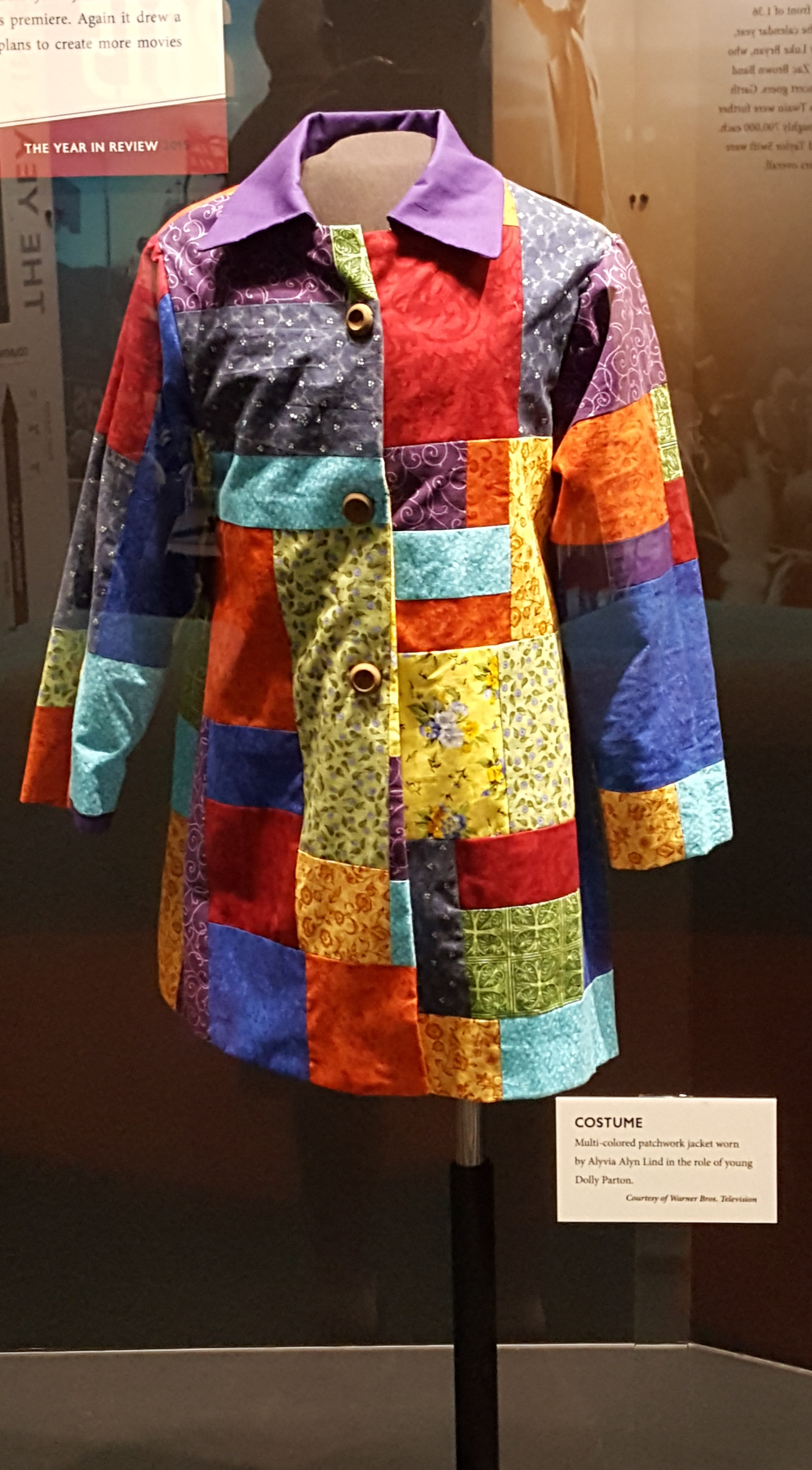
Coat worn by young Dolly in the film Dolly Parton's Coat of Many Colors

Parton stated that the original coat was dismantled and used for various other purposes, but her mother did make a new one to use on display in her Chasing Rainbows Museum at Dollywood. Wagoner also donated the framed dry cleaning receipt–on which Parton composed the song–to the museum, where it now hangs.

== Interpretations by other artists ==
Shania Twain recorded a cover version of the song on the 2003 Parton tribute album Just Because I'm a Woman: Songs of Dolly Parton, with accompaniment by Alison Krauss and Union Station. This version peaked at #57 on the Billboard Hot Country Singles & Tracks chart based only on unsolicited airplay. Other cover versions include a 1976 recording by Emmylou Harris on her Reprise Records debut Pieces of the Sky; decades later, Harris performed the song live in 2017 for the getTV special A Nashville Christmas. A recording of the song by Eva Cassidy was released on the 2008 posthumous collection Somewhere. Scottish comedian Billy Connolly recorded a version in 1975 on his album Get Right Intae Him (Unicorn Artists). This was a serious version unlike his comical song "D.I.V.O.R.C.E." which parodied "D-I-V-O-R-C-E", made popular by Tammy Wynette and also covered by Parton. Melinda Schneider and Beccy Cole covered the song on their album Great Women of Country (2014). In 2022, Brandi Carlile and Pink performed the song together during Parton's induction to the Rock and Roll Hall of Fame. In October 2026, country singer Ashley McBryde performed the song at the tribute show CMA Presents I Will Always Love You: A Celebration of Dolly Parton.

== Legacy ==
In 2005, The Atlanta Journal-Constitution ranked "Coat of Many Colors" number 10 on its list of 100 Songs of the South. A 1996 children's picture book of the song, with illustrations by Judith Sutton, was published by Harpercollins Children's Books. In 2008, Kristy Lee Cook performed this song on American Idol during Dolly Parton Week.

In 2011, Parton's recording was added to the Library of Congress's National Recording Registry list of sound recordings that "are culturally, historically, or aesthetically important, and/or inform or reflect life in the United States."

A TV movie was broadcast in December 2015 by NBC, with Alyvia Alyn Lind as young Dolly. Lind reprised her role as young Dolly in the 2016 television movie sequel Dolly Parton's Christmas of Many Colors: Circle of Love.

In 2021, it was ranked at No. 263 on Rolling Stone's "Top 500 Greatest Songs of All Time".

On a list of the 50 best Dolly Parton songs, Rolling Stone magazine ranked "Coat of Many Colors" at number 2, saying "Had it been the only song she'd ever written, the expression of overwhelming pride and crushing anguish ... would have secured her indelible legacy."

== Chart performance ==
Chart (1971-1972)	Peak position
Australia (Kent Music Report)	60
Canadian RPM Country Tracks	15
US Hot Country Songs (Billboard)	4

Chart (2026)	Peak position
Nigeria Airplay (TurnTable)	76
Sweden Heatseeker (Sverigetopplistan)	12

== Certifications ==
Region	Certification	Certified units/sales
Australia (ARIA)	Gold	35,000^{‡}
^{‡} Sales+streaming figures based on certification alone.
