= My Tennessee Mountain Home =

Studio album by Dolly Parton
- Released: April 2, 1973
- Recorded: September 1–October 3, 1972
- Studio: RCA Studio A (Nashville)
- Genre: Country
- Length: 31:31
- Label: RCA Victor
- Producer: Bob Ferguson

Dolly Parton chronology
We Found It (1973)	My Tennessee Mountain Home (1973)	Love and Music (1973)

Singles from My Tennessee Mountain Home
- 1. "My Tennessee Mountain Home" Released: December 4, 1972

My Tennessee Mountain Home is the eleventh solo studio album by American entertainer Dolly Parton. It was released on April 2, 1973, by RCA Victor. The house pictured on the album cover was the house in which the Parton family lived during the late 1940s and early 1950s.

== Content ==
Largely a concept album about her childhood in rural East Tennessee, the album begins with a recitation of the first letter Parton wrote to her parents shortly after moving from her hometown of Sevierville, Tennessee to Nashville in 1964. It was the first album for which Parton was the exclusive songwriter. Most of the songs are fond reminiscences of her youth and family, though in one song, "In the Good Old Days (When Times Were Bad)", Parton candidly admits that though she is grateful for the lessons the poverty of her childhood taught her, she is in no hurry to repeat the experience. The final cut on the album, "Down on Music Row", recounts her first days on Nashville's Music Row, trying to get a record deal, and thanking those who helped her along the way, making specific mention of Chet Atkins and RCA's Bob Ferguson.

In 2022, the Tennessee General Assembly passed legislation signed into law by Governor Bill Lee to add “My Tennessee Mountain Home” as one of Tennessee’s official state songs.

== Reception ==
Professional ratings
Review scores
Source	Rating
AllMusic	3/5 stars
Christgau's Record Guide	B+
The Encyclopedia of Popular Music	4/5 stars
Music Box	3.5/5 stars
Pitchfork	2.2/10
Uncut	4/5 stars

In a positive review of the album, Billboard said,

"This is an autobiography, from start to finish. Telling musically what has happened in Dolly's life, her relationships with her family and friends, her career, etc. A little out of the ordinary and her devotees will love it. It even has liner notes by her parents, and a picture of her early home."

They named "In the Good Old Days (When Times Were Bad)", "My Tennessee Mountain Home", and "Down on Music Row" as the best cuts on the album.

Though neither the album nor the title single were huge commercial hits for Parton — neither cracked the top ten on the U.S. country singles or albums charts — they remain fondly remembered by her fans; the My Tennessee Mountain Home album is among the most critically praised albums in Parton's catalogue. The title track became one of Parton's better-known compositions.

== Legacy ==
In later years, Parton has used the song "My Tennessee Mountain Home" as a theme song for her Dollywood theme park.

In 2009, "Eugene, Oregon" and Parton's original recording of "What Will Baby Be?," two outtakes from the recording sessions for this album, were released on the 4-disc, career-spanning box set "Dolly." Parton would later re-record "What Will Baby Be?" for inclusion on 1992's Slow Dancing with the Moon.

In 2010, Sony Music reissued the 2007 CD My Tennessee Mountain Home in a triple-feature CD set with Coat of Many Colors and Jolene and they have never been out of print.

In 2024, Mojo ranked the album at #5 in a list of Parton's best recordings.

== Track listing ==
All tracks are written by Dolly Parton.

Side one
No.	Title	Recording date	Length
1.	"The Letter"	September 5, 1972	2:03
2.	"I Remember"	October 3, 1972	3:42
3.	"Old Black Kettle"	September 5, 1972	2:32
4.	"Daddy's Working Boots"	September 1, 1972	2:52
5.	"Dr. Robert F. Thomas"	October 2, 1972	2:36
6.	"In the Good Old Days (When Times were Bad)"	October 2, 1972	3:26

Side two
No.	Title	Recording date	Length
1.	"My Tennessee Mountain Home"	September 1, 1972	3:05
2.	"Wrong Direction Home"	September 1, 1972	2:28
3.	"Back Home"	October 3, 1972	2:44
4.	"The Better Part of Life"	October 3, 1972	3:13
5.	"Down on Music Row"	September 5, 1972	2:58

2007 CD reissue
No.	Title	Recording date	Length
12.	"Sacred Memories"	September 1, 1972	2:44

== Personnel ==
- Dolly Parton – vocals, guitar
- Jimmy Colvard – guitar
- Jimmy Capps – guitar
- Dave Kirby – guitar
- Bobby Thompson – guitar
- Chip Young – guitar
- Pete Drake – pedal steel guitar
- Don Warden – dobro
- Bobby Dyson – bass
- Jerry Carrigan – drums
- Buck Trent – banjo
- Mack Magaha – fiddle
- Johnny Gimble – fiddle
- Hargus "Pig" Robbins – piano
- Charlie McCoy – harmonica
- Mary Hoephinger – harp
- The Nashville Edition – background vocals

== Charts ==
Chart performance for My Tennessee Mountain Home
Chart (1973)	Peak position
US Top Country Albums (Billboard)	19
US Cashbox Country Albums	18
