= Heartaches by the Number (Waylon Jennings album) =

Compilation album by Waylon Jennings
- Released: July 1972
- Recorded: 1966–1968
- Genres: Country, outlaw country
- Label: RCA Camden
- Producer: Chet Atkins

Waylon Jennings chronology
Good Hearted Woman (1972)	Heartaches by the Number (1972)	Ladies Love Outlaws (1972)

Professional ratings
Review scores
Source	Rating
Allmusic	5/5 stars

Heartaches by the Number is the fourth compilation album by Waylon Jennings issued in 1972 on RCA Camden, a budget label of RCA Records.

The contents of this album were taken from the 1966 album Leavin' Town, the 1967 album Waylon Sings Ol' Harlan and the 1968 album Jewels.

== Reissues ==
In 1975, Pickwick Records gained the right to reissue this album but went out of print in 1982 when US Pickwick folded. In 1999, Delta Entertainment issued this on CD (though with different cover art) for the first time. In 2004, Collectables Records issued this album with The One and Only Waylon Jennings as a two-for-one CD. The following year, Sony BMG Strategic Marketing reissued this yet again, this time with the original cover art.

The Collectables CD was very similar to a 1982 RCA Special Products double-LP release called "Waylon!".

== Tracks ==
No.	Title	Length
1.	"Heartaches by the Number"
2.	"Tiger by the Tail"
3.	"Foolin' 'Round"
4.	"(That's What You Get) For Lovin' Me"
5.	"You're Gonna Wonder About Me"
6.	"Folsom Prison Blues"
7.	"Busted"
8.	"Time to Bum Again"
9.	"Leavin' Town"
