= My Tennessee Mountain Home (song) =

Single by Dolly Parton

from the album My Tennessee Mountain Home
- B-side: "The Better Part of Life"
- Released: December 4, 1972
- Recorded: September 1 and December 12, 1972
- Studio: RCA Studio B, Nashville
- Genre: Country
- Label: RCA Victor
- Songwriter: Dolly Parton
- Producer: Bob Ferguson

Dolly Parton singles chronology
"When I Sing for Him" (1972)	"My Tennessee Mountain Home" (1972)	"Traveling Man" (1973)

"My Tennessee Mountain Home" is a song written and recorded by American country music artist Dolly Parton. Using imagery from her rural childhood in Tennessee (holding hands on a porch swing, enjoying nature, walking home from church), the song served as the centerpiece of her 1973 concept album My Tennessee Mountain Home. It was released as a single in December 1972, and reached number 15 on the U.S. country singles chart.

== Personnel ==
- Dolly Parton — vocals
- Jimmy Capps, Jimmy Colvard, Dave Kirby, Chip Young, Bobby Thompson — guitars
- Bobby Dyson — bass
- Jerry Carrigan — drums
- Hargus "Pig" Robbins — piano
- Pete Drake — steel guitar
- Don Warden — dobro
- Charlie McCoy — harmonica
- Johnny Gimble, Mark McGaha — fiddle
- Buck Trent — banjo
- Mary Hoephinger — harp
- June Page, Joe Babcock, Dolores Edgin, Hurshel Wiginton — background vocals

== Other versions ==
The song has become one of Parton's best known compositions, and was later covered by Maria Muldaur on her 1973 eponymous solo album, and by Elisabeth Andreassen on the 2005 album Short Stories. Dolly Parton herself re-recorded the song on her 1994 live album Heartsongs.

A cover version named "Ett bättre liv" (A Better Life) was recorded in Swedish by Lasse Stefanz and a children's choir. The song appears on the 1986 album Den lilla klockan, with lyrics by the pseudonym "Mackan".

== Chart performance ==
Chart (1972–1973)	Peak position
US Hot Country Songs (Billboard)	15
Canadian RPM Country Tracks	10
