= RCA Camden =

Budget record label

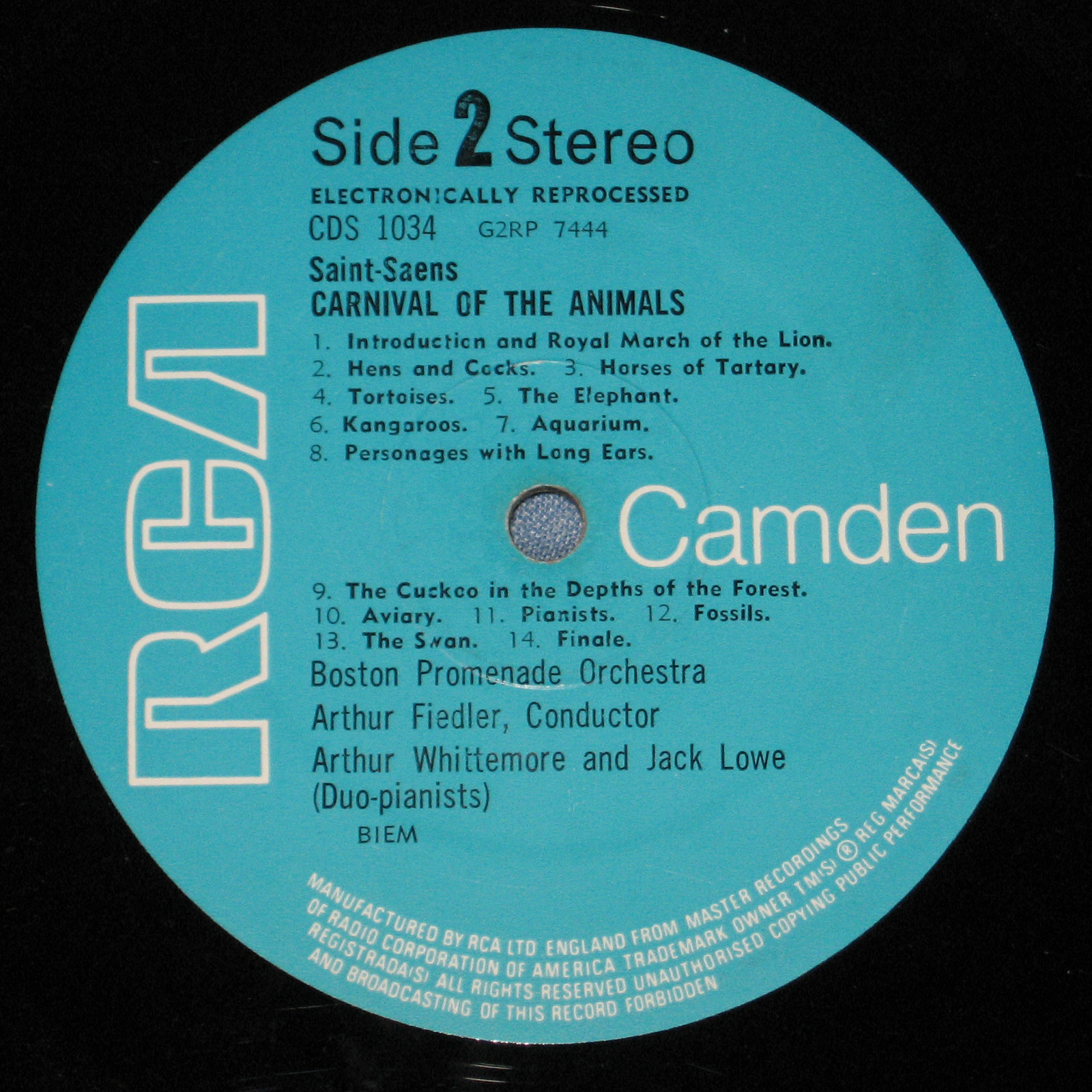
RCA Camden record label circa late 1960s to early 1970s.

RCA Camden is a budget record label of RCA Victor, originally created in 1953 to reissue recordings from earlier 78 rpm releases. The label was named "Camden", after Camden, New Jersey where the offices, factories and studios of RCA Victor and its predecessor, the Victor Talking Machine Company had been located since 1901.

== History ==
RCA Victor originally created the Camden label to reissue select older 78 rpm Red Seal recordings of classical symphonic music on LP records. In the mid 1950s, RCA Camden began releasing some rhythm & blues and, later, pop, country and rock and roll recordings. For example, in 1956, Camden issued an album of the very first recordings made by Little Richard for RCA Victor in 1951 and 1952, expanded with four tracks by Buck Ram and his Rock n' Ram Orchestra. In 1958, Camden released some albums in RCA Victor's new Living Stereo format and subsequently issued popular stereo recordings by the Oslo Philharmonic Orchestra, The Living Strings and Living Voices. Camden also produced a "Designed for Dancing" series, with titles by Xavier Cugat and Perez Prado, and others.

Beginning in the late 1950s, the RCA Camden label was headed by long-time RCA Victor record producer Ethel Gabriel. Gabriel was soon earning producer credits, which she continued to do for the rest of her career at RCA Victor.

In 1959, Gabriel introduced "Living Strings", a successful series of easy-listening albums mostly released through the Camden label. This later expanded to include "Living Voices", "Living Guitars" and other lines, and became a highly profitable series for RCA Victor.

In a 1992 interview, Gabriel noted that this was not what her unnamed boss had expected when her boss put her in charge of the then-struggling Camden label, saying "I’m sure he thought it was a way to get rid of me... Well, I made a multimillion-dollar line out of it, conceived, programmed and produced the entire thing."

=== First releases ===
RCA Victor originally reissued its older 78 rpm Red Seal classical symphonic recordings on the Camden label using the actual names of the symphony orchestras involved; but soon, to avoid competing with recent full-priced recordings by the same orchestras, a series of pseudonyms were used, drawn primarily from the names of hotels in nearby Philadelphia, across the Delaware River from RCA Victor's headquarters in Camden. Here is a partial listing of the real orchestras and their pseudonyms:

- BBC Symphony Orchestra – Thames Symphony Orchestra
- Boston Pops Orchestra – Festival Concert Orchestra
- Boston Symphony Orchestra – Centennial Symphony Orchestra
- Charlie Lemon and his Orchestra – Golden Sound Jazz Orchestra
- Chicago Symphony Orchestra – Century Symphony Orchestra
- Cincinnati Symphony Orchestra – Cromwell Symphony Orchestra
- Henri Rene and his Orchestra – Cosmopolitan Orchestra
- Hollywood Bowl Symphony Orchestra – Star Symphony Orchestra
- Indianapolis Symphony Orchestra – Sussex Symphony Orchestra
- London Philharmonic Orchestra – Stratford Symphony Orchestra
- London Symphony Orchestra – Jewel Symphony Orchestra
- Minneapolis Symphony Orchestra – Marlborough Symphony Orchestra
- National Symphony Orchestra – Globe Symphony Orchestra
- Paris Conservatory Orchestra – Seine Symphony Orchestra
- Philadelphia Orchestra – Warwick Symphony Orchestra
- RCA Victor Symphony Orchestra – Regent Symphony Orchestra or Golden Symphony Orchestra
- Saint Louis Symphony Orchestra – Savoy Symphony or Schuyler Symphony Orchestra
- San Francisco Symphony Orchestra – World Wide Symphony
- Toronto Symphony Orchestra – Dominion Symphony Orchestra
- Vienna Philharmonic Orchestra – Danube Symphony Orchestra

The RCA Victor Symphony Orchestra was assembled for recording sessions mostly during the 1940s and '50s; It primarily consisted of members from the NBC Symphony Orchestra, the New York Philharmonic and the Metropolitan Opera Orchestra. The New York City Symphony Orchestra, created by Leopold Stokowski in the 1940s, recorded for RCA Victor and some of its recordings were reissued on Camden LPs under the name "Sutton Symphony Orchestra," not to be confused with a British orchestra with the same name.

=== Later releases ===
In 1960, RCA Victor launched the RCA Victrola budget label to reissue lower priced classical and operatic recordings drawn from the Red Seal catalog. With a few exceptions, RCA Camden ceased reissuing former Red Seal titles and began offering many more albums by RCA Victor's pop and country music artists. In Canada, in addition to handling the U.S. releases on the label for the Canadian market, the RCA Camden imprint was also used to issue both current and compilation albums by RCA Victor Canada's country Artists. Country music sold extremely well in Canada and RCA Camden issued a number of albums unique to Canada that were never released in the United States.

From 1968 to 1975, RCA Camden issued a series of compilation albums featuring recordings by Elvis Presley, who recorded for the main RCA Victor label. These albums primarily consisted of repackagings of some of Presley's less popular 1960s-era movie soundtrack recordings; some albums, such as Elvis Sings Flaming Star also featured previously unreleased material, while another album, Let's Be Friends featured most of the soundtrack to Presley's final scripted film, Change of Habit (1969). Two later compilations, Burning Love and Hits from His Movies, Volume 2 and Separate Ways actually featured then-current chart hits for Presley, originally issued as singles on the RCA Victor label. The inclusion of these recent hit singles resulted in both Camden albums – which otherwise contained previously released and generally undistinguished movie and studio tracks – making the US charts. In 1975, RCA leased the reissue rights of several different Camden albums, including Presley's, to Pickwick Records, which subsequently reissued several of them under its own branding. After Presley's unexpected death in August, 1977, demand for his recordings skyrocketed; RCA soon terminated the reissue agreement with Pickwick primarily to regain the rights to the Pickwick leased Presley titles and began reissuing and repackaging several of them.

During the early- to mid-1970s, as the popularity of RCA country artist Dolly Parton, rapidly grew, RCA reissued much of her earlier material in a series of compilations on the Camden label to capitalize on her more recent success. Just the Way I Am, Mine, Just Because I'm a Woman (not to be confused with Parton's 1968 debut RCA Victor solo album of the same name), and I Wish I Felt This Way at Home were all issued between 1972 and 1976, and were largely made up of lesser known material Parton had recorded for RCA Victor during the late 1960s and early '70s. As with the Presley titles, RCA also leased the reissue rights to Parton's Camden albums to Pickwick, which reissued the albums on their own label during the late 1970s.

The RCA Camden label continued well into the compact disc era, and was still active in the UK, Canada, Australia and several other countries until at least the early 21st century. Beginning in the late 1980s, RCA/BMG of Canada reissued several Camden albums on CD in the "RCA Camden Classics" series. Sony Music Entertainment, the current owner of the RCA Victor archives, continues to reissue recordings previously available on the RCA Camden label.

== See also ==
- RCA Camden discography
- List of record labels
