= My Favorite Songwriter, Porter Wagoner =

Studio album by Dolly Parton
- Released: October 2, 1972
- Recorded: 1972
- Studio: RCA Studio B (Nashville)
- Genre: Country
- Length: 27:54
- Label: RCA Victor
- Producer: Bob Ferguson

Dolly Parton chronology
Together Always (1972)	My Favorite Songwriter, Porter Wagoner (1972)	We Found It (1973)

Singles from My Favorite Songwriter, Porter Wagoner
- 1. "Washday Blues" Released: July 10, 1972; 2. "When I Sing for Him" Released: September 4, 1972

My Favorite Songwriter, Porter Wagoner is the tenth solo studio album by American singer-songwriter Dolly Parton. It was released on October 2, 1972, by RCA Victor.

This album was released on CD for the first time on August 17, 2010, along with 1970's The Fairest of Them All. The album was released as a digital download on January 11, 2011.

== Critical reception ==
Professional ratings
Review scores
Source	Rating
AllMusic	4/5 stars

The review published in the October 14, 1972 issue of Billboard said, "Dolly Parton is coming on as the leading female country singer in the business. Here, she does "Lonely Comin' Down", "Do You Hear the Robins Sing", and "Still on Your Mind". "When I Sing for Him" is an excellently done gospel tune. Another stirring LP from Dolly!"

Cashbox gave a positive review of the album: "Dolly Parton—which is more beautiful, her voice or her looks? Whatever the answer, the combination of the two is simply devastating! Dolly radiates her inner soul through both her looks and her voice, and has shown time and time again that purity of feeling wins out over flashy singing tricks—her talent stands the test of time. In her liner notes, Dolly emphatically states that Porter Wagoner is her favorite songwriter, and for that reason she has recorded an album of his songs exclusively. The team of Dolly's performance and Porter's writing is another "perfect combination." A superlative album."

== Track listing ==
All tracks are written by Porter Wagoner, except where noted.

Side one
No.	Title	Recording date	Length
1.	"Lonely Comin' Down"	May 3, 1972	3:10
2.	"Do You Hear the Robins Sing"	May 4, 1972	2:27
3.	"What Ain't to Be, Just Might Happen"	June 19, 1972	2:22
4.	"The Bird That Never Flew"	May 4, 1972	3:13
5.	"Comes and Goes"	May 2, 1972	3:15

Side two
No.	Title	Recording date	Length
1.	"Washday Blues"	May 3, 1972	2:04
2.	"When I Sing for Him"	May 4, 1972	2:58
3.	"He Left Me Love"	May 2, 1972	2:57
4.	"Oh, He's Everywhere"	May 3, 1972	3:01
5.	"Still on Your Mind"	January 12, 1972	2:41

2011 digital download reissue
No.	Title	Writer(s)	Recording date	Length
1.	"Everything Is Beautiful (In Its Own Way)"	Dolly Parton	May 20, 1969	3:09
2.	"Lonely Comin' Down"		May 3, 1972	3:10
3.	"Do You Hear the Robins Sing"		May 4, 1972	2:27
4.	"What Ain't to Be Just Might Happen"		June 19, 1972	2:22
5.	"The Bird That Never Flew"		May 4, 1972	3:13
6.	"Comes and Goes"		May 2, 1972	3:15
7.	"Washday Blues"		May 3, 1972	2:04
8.	"When I Sing for Him"		May 4, 1972	2:58
9.	"He Left Me Love"		May 2, 1972	2:57
10.	"Oh, He's Everywhere"		May 3, 1972	3:01
11.	"Still on Your Mind"		January 12, 1972	2:41
12.	"Just as Good as Gone"	Parton	April 27, 1971	2:27

== Charts ==
Chart performance for My Favorite Songwriter, Porter Wagoner
Chart (1972)	Peak position
US Top Country Albums (Billboard)	33
US Cashbox Country Albums	18
