= I Will Always Love You and Other Greatest Hits =

Greatest hits album by Dolly Parton
- Released: April 1996
- Recorded: 1989–1995
- Genre: Country
- Length: 35:16
- Label: Columbia
- Producer: Steve Buckingham

Dolly Parton chronology
Something Special (1995)	I Will Always Love You and Other Greatest Hits (1996)	Treasures (1996)

Professional ratings
Review scores
Source	Rating
AllMusic	3/5 stars
The Encyclopedia of Popular Music	3/5 stars

I Will Always Love You and Other Greatest Hits is a 1996 Dolly Parton compilation which Columbia Records put together as Parton was leaving the label. The compilation included material from five of her eight CBS albums.

== Track listing ==
1. "Why'd You Come in Here Lookin' Like That" (Bob Carlisle, Randy Thomas) – 2:32
2. "Yellow Roses" (Dolly Parton) – 3:55
3. "White Limozeen" (Mac Davis, D. Parton) – 4:17
4. "Eagle When She Flies" (D. Parton) – 3:10
5. "Romeo" (D. Parton) – 3:33
6. "Rockin' Years" (Floyd Parton) – 3:24
  - duet with Ricky Van Shelton
7. "To Daddy" (D. Parton) – 2:41
8. "Silver and Gold" (Carl Perkins, Greg Perkins, Stan Perkins) – 3:50
9. "He's Alive" (Don Francisco) – 4:37
10. "I Will Always Love You" (D. Parton) – 3:17
  - duet with Vince Gill
- Tracks 1,2,3 & 9 are from the 1989 studio album White Limozeen
- Tracks 4,6 & 8 are from the 1991 studio album Eagle When She Flies
- Track 5 is from the 1993 studio album Slow Dancing With the Moon
- Track 7 is from the 1994 live album Heartsongs: Live from Home
- Track 10 is from the 1995 studio album Something Special

== Chart performance ==
Chart (1996)	Peak position
U.S. Billboard Top Country Albums	47
