= Dolly (1976 TV series) =

American variety show

- Genre: Variety show
- Written by: Paul C. Elliott; Bill Graham
- Directed by: Bill Turner
- Starring: Dolly Parton
- Theme music composer: Dolly Parton
- Opening theme: "Love Is Like a Butterfly" performed by Dolly Parton
- Ending theme: "I Will Always Love You" performed by Dolly Parton
- Country of origin: United States
- Original language: English
- No. of seasons: 1
- No. of episodes: 26

Production
- Executive producers: Reg Dunlap; Bill Graham
- Producers: Reg Dunlap; Bill Graham
- Production location: Opryland (Nashville)
- Editor: Terry Gilmer
- Camera setup: Multi-camera
- Running time: 30 min
- Production companies: Show Biz, Inc.

Original release
- Network: First run syndication
- Release: September 13, 1976 – March 7, 1977

Related
- Dolly (1987)

Dolly is an American variety show starring Dolly Parton broadcast in first-run syndication from September 13, 1976, to March 7, 1977.

== Background ==
In the mid-1970s, Parton was approached by Bill Graham, president of Show Biz, Inc., the same company that produced The Porter Wagoner Show (on which Parton had co-starred for seven years). The syndicated variety show Dolly was created soon afterwards.

== Production ==
The pilot episode with Ronnie Milsap was filmed on February 4, 1976, at Opryland Studios. The series began production of the next four episodes the week of April 26–30. The first 11 episodes had been filmed by July and production was scheduled to resume on October 4, according to an article in Billboard. At the time of the article, the series was committed to 71 stations and was expected to reach 130 stations before its premiere in September. The show boasted a budget of up to $100,000 per episode, an impressive sum for a syndicated series, making it the most expensive show to be produced out of Nashville at the time. A variety of celebrities appeared on the show, including Karen Black, Tom T. Hall, Emmylou Harris, The Hues Corporation, Captain Kangaroo, Lynn Anderson, Marilyn McCoo and Billy Davis Jr., Ronnie Milsap, Anne Murray, Kenny Rogers, Linda Ronstadt, KC and the Sunshine Band, and Anson Williams. According to a 1978 biography by Alanna Nash, Parton spoke to Bob Dylan and he initially agreed to do the show, but eventually bowed out due to his discomfort with the television medium at the time.

Among the more well received installments, was one featuring the first televised performance of the Trio: Parton, Emmylou Harris and Linda Ronstadt, a full decade before they released the first of their two critically acclaimed albums.

The show was also the first time Parton and Kenny Rogers worked together; the two would top the country and pop charts in 1983 with their mega hit "Islands in the Stream".

Despite the work that went into the show and the diverse collection of guests, Parton was said to have been less than pleased with the end product, as she found herself singing standards like "My Funny Valentine", which she felt didn't suit her voice or musical style, and interacting with guests with whom she had little in common. She told Nash during a 1977 interview:

"I liked all of the people that were on...but I would have had a totally different lineup of guests myself. It was really bad for me, that TV show. It was worse for me than good, because the people who didn't know me who liked the show thought that's how I was...I mean, I still come through as myself, even with all the other stuff, but not really like I should. Not my real, natural way. And the people who did know me thought I was crazy. They knew that wasn't me. Including me. I didn't know that woman on TV!"

The show lasted only one season despite very high ratings, falling apart when Parton asked out of her contract for a variety of reasons, including the toll that eighteen-hour days were taking on her vocal cords.

== Opening and closing themes ==
The show's opening theme was "Love Is Like a Butterfly". During the opening credits, Parton emerges on a swing and then comes down to sing the opening song, either a cover of a then-current hit, or occasionally one of her own hits.

At the closing of the show, Parton speaks the recitation from "I Will Always Love You", "And I hope life treats you kind, and I hope that you have all you ever dream of. I wish you joy and lots and lots of happiness, but above all this, I wish you love, I love you" and then she says "Goodnight" and sings the rest of the song and the closing credits roll.

== Episodes ==
Dolly originally aired in first-run syndication, meaning its broadcast rights were sold to various television stations around the country. These stations could then choose their own day and time to air the show, as well as what order to air the episodes. Due to this fact, the show aired on different days and times around the county and episodes were shown in various orders. The episodes are presented here in the order they were originally broadcast by WNGE-TV Channel 2 in Nashville on Mondays at 6:30 PM.

No. in season	Title	Original release date	Prod. code
1	"Featuring Captain Kangaroo"	September 13, 1976	109
Guest(s): Robert Keeshan as Captain Kangaroo Songs: "Joy to the World" (Dolly); "How Much Is That Doggie in the Window?" (Dolly); "Three Little Fishes" (Dolly and Captain Kangaroo); "Thank Heaven for Little Girls" (Captain Kangaroo); "My Tennessee Mountain Home" (Dolly); "Coat of Many Colors" (Dolly); "Abadaba Honeymoon" (Dolly); "Sleepyhead" (Captain Kangaroo); "I Will Always Love You" (Dolly)
2	"Featuring Anne Murray and Randy Parton"	September 20, 1976	105
Guest(s): Anne Murray and Randy Parton Songs: "Let Me Be There" (Dolly); "The Battle of New Orleans" (Dolly); "Blue Finger Lou" (Anne Murray); "Tennessee Born" (Randy Parton); "All I Can Do" (Dolly with Anne Murray and Randy Parton); "Drift Away" (Dolly with Anne Murray and Randy Parton); "Golden Oldie" (Anne Murray); "I Will Always Love You" (Dolly)
3	"Featuring Kenny Rogers"	September 27, 1976	107
Guest(s): Kenny Rogers Songs: "Knock Three Times" (Dolly); "Bad, Bad Leroy Brown" (Dolly); "Love Lifted Me" (Kenny Rogers); "He's Got the Whole World in His Hands" (Dolly and Kenny Rogers); "Joshua" (Dolly); "The World Needs a Melody" (Kenny Rogers); Medley: "Spanish Eyes" / "Brown Eyed Handsome Man" / "Blue Eyes Crying in the Rain" (Dolly and Kenny Rogers); "I Will Always Love You" (Dolly)
4	"Featuring Ronnie Milsap"	October 4, 1976	101
Guest(s): Ronnie Milsap Songs: "Bad, Bad Leroy Brown" (Dolly); "Me and Little Andy" (Dolly); "Pure Love" (Ronnie Milsap); "The Night Life" (Dolly); "Rollin' in My Sweet Baby's Arms" (Dolly and Ronnie Milsap); "A Legend in My Time" (Ronnie Milsap); "I Believe in Music" (Dolly and Ronnie Milsap); "I Will Always Love You" (Dolly)
5	"Featuring the Hues Corporation"	October 11, 1976	103
Guest(s): The Hues Corporation Songs: "Thank God I'm a Country Girl" (Dolly); "I'll Take a Melody" (The Hues Corporation); "Today I Started Loving You Again" (Dolly and the Hues Corporation); "Down on Music Row" (Dolly); "Rock the Boat" (The Hues Corporation); Medley: "Blues Stay Away from My Door" / "Song Sung Blue" / "My Blue Tears" (Dolly); "I Will Always Love You" (Dolly)
6	"Featuring Emmylou Harris and Linda Ronstadt"	October 18, 1976	104
Guest(s): Emmylou Harris and Linda Ronstadt Songs: "Silver Threads and Golden Needles" (Dolly with Emmylou Harris and Linda Ronstadt); "My Blue Ridge Mountain Boy" (Emmylou Harris); "I Can't Help It (If I'm Still in Love with You)" (Linda Ronstadt); "Applejack" (Dolly, Emmylou Harris and Linda Ronstadt); "Do I Ever Cross Your Mind" (Dolly); "The Sweetest Gift" (Dolly, Emmylou Harris and Linda Ronstadt); "Bury Me Beneath the Willow Tree" (Dolly, Emmylou Harris and Linda Ronstadt); "I Will Always Love You" (Dolly)
7	"Featuring Tennessee Ernie Ford"	October 25, 1976	106
Guest(s): Tennessee Ernie Ford Songs: "Jolene" (Dolly); Medley: "Sunshine on My Shoulders" / "Walking in the Sunshine" (Dolly); "I've Been to Georgia on a Fast Train" (Tennessee Ernie Ford); "I Believe" (Dolly and Tennessee Ernie Ford); "Tiptoe Through the Tulips" (Dolly); "Sixteen Tons" (Tennessee Ernie Ford); "The Twelfth of Never" (Dolly); "I Will Always Love You" (Dolly)
8	"Featuring Billy Davis Jr. and Marilyn McCoo"	November 1, 1976	110
Guest(s): Billy Davis Jr. and Marilyn McCoo Songs: "Proud Mary" (Dolly); "Rhinestone Cowgirl" (Dolly); "I Hope We Get to Love in Time" (Billy Davis Jr. and Marilyn McCoo); "Love Is Like a Butterfly" (Dolly); "You Can Change My Heart" (Billy Davis Jr. and Marilyn McCoo); "Take These Chains from My Heart" (Dolly, Billy Davis Jr. and Marilyn McCoo); "You" (Dolly); "I Will Always Love You" (Dolly)
9	"Featuring Jim Stafford"	November 8, 1976	102
Guest(s): Jim Stafford Songs: "Hey, Lucky Lady" (Dolly); "Jasper Dan" (Jim Stafford); "Queen of the Silver Dollar" (Dolly); Medley: "Yesterday" / "For the Good Times" / "Help Me Make It Through the Night" / "Bridge Over Troubled Water" (Dolly); The Nickel Pickin' Song" (Jim Stafford); "Spiders and Snakes" (Dolly and Jim Stafford); "I Will Always Love You" (Dolly)
10	"Featuring Anson Williams"	November 15, 1976	111
Guest(s): Anson Williams Songs: "Love Will Keep Us Together" (Dolly); "Early Morning Breeze" (Dolly); "Everybody Needs a Rainbow" (Anson Williams); "Everything Old Is New Again" (Dolly); "In the Middle of the Night" (Anson Williams); "Mack the Knife" (Dolly and Anson Williams); "The Bargain Store" (Dolly); "I Will Always Love You" (Dolly)
11	"Featuring Lynn Anderson"	November 22, 1976	112
Guest(s): Lynn Anderson Songs: "That'll Be the Day" (Dolly and Lynn Anderson); "Sweet Talkin' Man" (Lynn Anderson); "Swanee" (Dolly); "Cry" (Lynn Anderson); "Gettin' Happy" (Dolly); "Taking Care of Business" (Dolly and Lynn Anderson); "We Used To" (Dolly); "Dumb Blonde" (Dolly and Lynn Anderson); "I Will Always Love You" (Dolly)
12	"Featuring Rod McKuen"	November 29, 1976	116
Guest(s): Rod McKuen Songs: "China Grove" (Dolly with Rod McKuen), "A Boy Named Charlie Brown" (Rod McKuen), "Feelings" (Dolly and Rod McKuen), "The World I Used to Know" (Rod McKuen); "My Funny Valentine" (Dolly), "All I Can Do" (Dolly and Rod McKuen), "Every Loner Has to Go Alone" (Dolly and Rod McKuen); "I Will Always Love You" (Dolly)
13	"Featuring KC and the Sunshine Band"	December 6, 1976	113
Guest(s): KC and the Sunshine Band Songs: "Flowers on the Wall" (Dolly); "Get Down Tonight" (KC and the Sunshine Band); "That's the Way I Like It" (KC and the Sunshine Band with Dolly); "He Would Know" (Dolly); "In the Ghetto" (Dolly); "Shake Your Booty" (KC and the Sunshine Band); "Cryin' Time" (Dolly and KC and the Sunshine Band); "I Will Always Love You" (Dolly)
14	"Featuring Bobby Goldsboro"	December 13, 1976	117
Guest(s): Bobby Goldsboro Songs: "The Door Is Always Open" (Dolly with Bobby Goldsboro); "Watching Scotty Grow" (Bobby Goldsboro); "A Little at a Time" (Dolly); "Butterflies" (Bobby Goldsboro); "The Carroll County Accident" (Dolly); "Proud Mary" (Dolly and Bobby Goldsboro); "Let It Be Me" (Dolly and Bobby Goldsboro); "I Will Always Love You" (Dolly)
15	"Featuring Chuck Woolery"	December 20, 1976	114
Guest(s): Chuck Woolery Songs: "Burning Love" (Dolly); "Sittin' on the Dock of the Bay" (Dolly); "Growing Up the Country Way" (Chuck Woolery); "Hello, Dolly!" (Dolly and cast); "Little Green Apples" (Chuck Woolery); "Help Me Make It Through the Night" (Dolly and Chuck Woolery); "Thank God I'm a Country Girl/Boy" (Dolly and Chuck Woolery); "I Will Always Love You" (Dolly)
16	"Featuring the Staple Singers"	December 27, 1976	118
Guest(s): The Staple Singers Songs: "Gypsy Fever" (Dolly); "Let's Do It Again" (The Staple Singers); "The House of the Rising Sun" (Dolly); "Love Me, Love Me, Love Me" (The Staple Singers); "Love with Me" (Dolly); "Highway Headin' South" (Dolly); "The Seeker" (Dolly and the Staple Singers); "I Will Always Love You" (Dolly)
17	"Featuring Pure Prairie League"	January 3, 1977	115
Guest(s): Pure Prairie League Songs: "Slippin' Away" (Dolly); "Two Lane Highway" (Pure Prairie League); "Down from Dover" (Dolly); "Gypsy Fever" (Dolly); "Afternoon Delight" (Dolly with Debbi Jo and Richard Dennison); "Dance" (Pure Prairie League); "Bye Bye Love" (Dolly and Pure Prairie League); "I Will Always Love You" (Dolly)
18	"Featuring John Hartford and LaCosta"	January 10, 1977	121
Guest(s): John Hartford and LaCosta Songs: "When Will I Be Loved" (Dolly with John Hartford and LaCosta); "Circle Game" (Dolly); "Skippin' in the Mississippi Dew" (John Hartford); "Shenandoah" (La Costa on harmonica); Medley: "Old Man River" / "Dixie Land" / "Battle Hymn of the Republic" (LaCosta); "Gentle on My Mind" (Dolly, John Hartford and LaCosta); "How Great Thou Art" (Dolly); "I Will Always Love You" (Dolly)
19	"Featuring Tom T. Hall"	January 17, 1977	120
Guest(s): Tom T. Hall Songs: "Sneaky Snake" (Dolly with Tom T. Hall); "Coat of Many Colors" (Dolly); "Old Dogs, Children and Watermelon Wine" (Tom T. Hall); "Cracker Jack" (Dolly); "I Love" (Dolly and Tom T. Hall); "I Care" (Tom T. Hall); "I Will Always Love You" (Dolly)
20	"Featuring Ray Stevens"	January 24, 1977	119
Guest(s): Ray Stevens Songs: "Great Balls of Fire" (Dolly); "Get Crazy with Me" (Ray Stevens); "Lyin' Eyes" (Dolly); "Happy, Happy Birthday Baby" (Dolly and Ray Stevens); "Sir Thanks-a-Lot" (Ray Stevens); "City of New Orleans" (Dolly); "Searchin'" (Dolly and Ray Stevens); "I Will Always Love You" (Dolly)
21	"Featuring the Parton Family"	January 31, 1977	124
Guest(s): The Parton Family (Dolly's parents, Robert Lee Parton and Avie Lee Parton; and siblings, Willadeene Parton, Stella Parton, Cassie Parton, Randy Parton, Floyd Parton, Freida Parton, and Rachel Parton) Songs: "Old Black Kettle" (Dolly and the Parton Family); "I'm Not That Good with Goodbye" (Stella Parton); "Down" (Randy Parton); "Brand New Key" (Dolly and Stella Parton); "Morning" (Willadeene Parton); "In the Pines" (Dolly and the Parton Family); "In the Sweet By-and-By" (Dolly and the Parton Family); "I Will Always Love You" (Dolly)
22	"Featuring Karen Black"	February 7, 1977	108
Guest(s): Karen Black Songs: "Gettin' Happy" (Dolly); "The First Time Ever I Saw Your Face" (Dolly); "Satin Sheets" (Karen Black); "What Ain't to Be Just Might Happen" (Dolly); "Did You Ever Wonder" (Karen Black); "Me and Bobby McGee" (Dolly and Karen Black); "I Will Always Love You" (Dolly)
23	"Featuring Mel Tillis"	February 14, 1977	123
Guest(s): Mel Tillis Songs: "The Entertainer" (Dolly with Mel Tillis); "The Last Time I Saw Him" (Dolly); "Good Woman Blues" (Mel Tillis); "Brother Love's Traveling Salvation Show" (Dolly); "I Order One for Me" (Mel Tillis); "Don't Let Go" (Dolly and Mel Tillis); "I Will Always Love You" (Dolly)
24	"Featuring the 5th Dimension"	February 21, 1977	122
Guest(s): The 5th Dimension Songs: "Promised Land" (Dolly); "We'll Sing in the Sunshine" (Dolly); "Workin' On a Groovy Thing" (The 5th Dimension); "Does Your Chewing Gum Lose Its Flavour (On the Bedpost Overnight?)" (Dolly and the 5th Dimension); "With Pen in Hand" (Dolly); "If That's the Way You Want It" (The 5th Dimension); "I Will Always Love You" (Dolly)
25	"Featuring Freddy Fender"	February 28, 1977	126
Guest(s): Freddy Fender Songs: "(Your Love Has Lifted Me) Higher and Higher" (Dolly); "Wasted Days and Wasted Nights" (Freddy Fender); "Mr. Bojangles" (Dolly); "Lovin' Cajun Style" (Dolly); Medley: "Dixie Land" / "Battle Hymn of the Republic" (Dolly); "Before the Next Teardrop Falls" (Dolly and Freddy Fender); "I Will Always Love You" (Dolly)
26	"Featuring Jim Ed Brown and Helen Cornelius"	March 7, 1977	125
Guest(s): Jim Ed Brown and Helen Cornelius Songs: "Loves Me Like a Rock" (Dolly); "I Don't Want to Have to Marry You" (Jim Ed Brown and Helen Cornelius); "The Way We Were" (Dolly); "Saying Hello, Saying I Love You, Saying Goodbye" (Jim Ed Brown and Helen Cornelius); "Midnight Train to Georgia" (Dolly); "Looking Back to See" (Dolly, Jim Ed Brown and Helen Cornelius); "Bubbling Over" (Dolly); "I Will Always Love You" (Dolly)

== Syndication and home media ==
During the late 1970s and into the early 1980s, as Parton's popularity grew, Dolly was seen widely in reruns.

On February 27, 2007, six episodes of the series were released on DVD under the title Dolly Parton & Friends.

GetTV began airing select episodes of the series in 2015.

Time Life released the 19-disc box set Dolly: The Ultimate Collection – Deluxe Edition in September 2020 and it features a selection of six episodes of the series, two of which had previously been released on the Dolly Parton & Friends DVD in 2007. Five of the six episodes on the box set are heavily edited due to copyright issues. To date 10 of the series' 26 episodes have been released on DVD.

Title	Episodes	Bonus features	Disc(s)	Ref.
Dolly Parton & Friends	Disc one: "Featuring Emmylou Harris and Linda Ronstadt"; "Featuring Anne Murray and Randy Parton"; "Featuring Ronnie Milsap"; Disc two: "Featuring Rod McKuen"; "Featuring Kenny Rogers"; "Featuring Billy Davis Jr. and Marilyn McCoo"	Disc one: "Comin' for to Carry Me Home" (The Porter Wagoner Show, 1971); Disc two: "Foggy Mountain Top" (The Porter Wagoner Show, 1969)	2	
Dolly: The Ultimate Collection – Deluxe Edition	Volume 1, Disc 4: "Featuring Emmylou Harris and Linda Ronstadt"; "Featuring the Parton Family" (edited); "Featuring Kenny Rogers" (edited); "Featuring KC and the Sunshine Band" (edited); "Featuring Tom T. Hall" (edited); "Featuring Freddy Fender" (edited)	Dolly: In Her Own Words	1	
