= All I Can Do =

All I Can Do may refer to:

- All I Can Do (album), a 1976 album by Dolly Parton
  - "All I Can Do" (Dolly Parton song)
- "All I Can Do" (Chantal Kreviazuk song)
- "All I Can Do" (Jump5 song)
- "All I Can Do" (The Carpenters song), from the 1969 album Ticket to Ride (album) (AKA Offering)
- "All I Can Do", a song by Mondo Generaror from the 2003 album A Drug Problem That Never Existed

== See also ==
- "All That I Can Do", a song by the Mighty Lemon Drops from the 1989 album Laughter
