= List of most watched United States television broadcasts of 1990 =

The following is a list of most watched United States television broadcasts of 1990.

== Most watched by week ==
Broadcast (primetime only)
Week of	Title	Network	Viewers (in millions)	Ref.
January 1	Roseanne	ABC	39.3	
January 8	NFC Championship	CBS	43.0	
January 15	The Cosby Show	NBC	38.4	
January 22	Super Bowl XXIV	CBS	73.9	
January 29	Roseanne	ABC	38.0	
February 5	America's Funniest Home Videos	ABC	40.5	
February 12	America's Funniest Home Videos	ABC	38.0	
February 19	The Cosby Show	NBC	37.6	
February 26	America's Funniest Home Videos	ABC	40.5	
March 5	America's Funniest Home Videos	ABC	43.6	
March 12	America's Funniest Home Videos	ABC	41.0	
March 19	America's Funniest Home Videos	ABC	40.7	
March 26	62nd Academy Awards	ABC	40.4	
April 2	America's Funniest Home Videos	ABC	40.3	
April 9	America's Funniest Home Videos	ABC	35.1	
April 16	America's Funniest Home Videos	ABC	38.1	
April 23	America's Funniest Home Videos	ABC	39.7	
April 30	America's Funniest Home Videos	ABC	36.6	
May 7	America's Funniest Home Videos	ABC	36.7	
May 14	America's Funniest Home Videos	ABC	46.7	
May 21	Newhart	CBS	29.5	
May 28	The Simpsons	Fox	28.7	
June 4	Roseanne	ABC	24.3	
June 11	The Simpsons	Fox	25.4	
June 18	The Simpsons	Fox	23.2	
June 25	Cheers	NBC	24.6	
July 2	Cheers	NBC	24.3	
July 9	1990 MLB All-Star Game	CBS	26.8	
July 16	The NBC Monday Movie	NBC	22.5	
July 23	Roseanne	ABC	22.1	
July 30	The Simpsons	Fox	22.0	
August 6	The Simpsons	Fox	21.8	
August 6	Cheers	NBC	21.8	
August 13	The Simpsons	Fox	23.5	
August 20	The Cosby Show	NBC	24.0	
August 27	Cheers	NBC	25.1	
September 3	Miss America 1991	NBC	25.5	
September 10	America's Funniest Home Videos	ABC	30.8	
1990–91 television season begins
September 17	Cheers	NBC	32.9	
September 24	America's Funniest Home Videos	ABC	30.1	
October 1	America's Funniest Home Videos	ABC	31.5	
October 8	The Simpsons	Fox	33.6	
October 15	America's Funniest People	ABC	33.3	
October 22	America's Funniest Home Videos	ABC	33.1	
October 29	America's Funniest Home Videos	ABC	34.1	
November 5	Cheers	NBC	45.9	
November 12	Cheers	NBC	34.1	
November 19	It	ABC	35.0	
November 26	America's Funniest Home Videos	ABC	31.1	
December 3	Monday Night Football	ABC	41.6	
December 10	Cheers	NBC	33.8	
December 17	Cheers	NBC	28.8	
December 17	Home for Christmas	ABC	28.8	
December 24	60 Minutes	CBS	34.0	
December 31	Bears vs. Saints (NFL)	CBS	39.5	
