= White Limozeen =

Studio album by Dolly Parton
- Released: May 30, 1989
- Recorded: c. February 1989
- Studios: Treasure Isle Recorders, Nashville; The Lawrence Welk "Champagne" Studio, Nashville
- Genre: Country
- Length: 35:23
- Label: Columbia
- Producer: Ricky Skaggs

Dolly Parton chronology
Rainbow (1987)	White Limozeen (1989)	Home for Christmas (1990)

Singles from White Limozeen
- 1. "Why'd You Come in Here Lookin' Like That" Released: April 24, 1989; 2. "Yellow Roses" Released: July 31, 1989; 3. "He's Alive" Released: November 6, 1989; 4. "Time for Me to Fly" Released: January 1, 1990; 5. "White Limozeen" Released: April 9, 1990; 6. "Slow Healing Heart" Released: October 15, 1990

Professional ratings
Review scores
Source	Rating
AllMusic	4.5/5 stars
Robert Christgau	B
The Encyclopedia of Popular Music	3/5 stars

White Limozeen is the twenty-ninth solo studio album by American entertainer Dolly Parton. It was released on May 30, 1989, by Columbia Records. The album returned the performer to the country music fold, after the critical and commercial failure of 1987's Rainbow. The album was produced by Ricky Skaggs, and featured a duet with Mac Davis, along with a cover version of Don Francisco's Christian classic, "He's Alive", as well as a bluegrass cover of the 1978 REO Speedwagon hit "Time for Me to Fly."

For Parton's efforts, she was rewarded with two country #1 singles: "Why'd You Come in Here Lookin' Like That" and "Yellow Roses". The album spent 100 weeks and peaked at #3 on the U.S. country albums chart and won Parton back much of the critical praise she had lost with Rainbow. It ended up being certified Gold by the Recording Industry Association of America. In 2009, Sony BMG re-released White Limozeen in a triple-feature CD set with Eagle When She Flies and Slow Dancing with the Moon.

== Track listing ==
No.	Title	Writer(s)	Length
1.	"Time for Me to Fly"	Kevin Cronin	2:53
2.	"Yellow Roses"	Dolly Parton	3:56
3.	"Why'd You Come in Here Lookin' Like That"	Bob Carlisle, Randy Thomas	2:33
4.	"Slow Healing Heart"	Jim Rushing	3:57
5.	"What Is It My Love"	Parton	4:14
6.	"White Limozeen"	Parton, Mac Davis	4:19
7.	"Wait 'Til I Get You Home" (duet with Mac Davis)	Parton, Davis	2:58
8.	"Take Me Back to the Country"	Karen Staley	2:35
9.	"The Moon, the Stars and Me"	Wayland Patton, Diana Rae	3:19
10.	"He's Alive"	Don Francisco	4:39
Total length:			35:23

== Chart performance ==
Album

Chart (1989)	Peak position
Australia (ARIA Charts)	116
Canadian RPM Country Albums	18
UK Country Albums Chart (Music Week)	4
U.S. Billboard Top Country Albums	3
US Cashbox Country Albums	4

Album (Year-End)

Chart (1989)	Peak Position
US Top Country Albums (Billboard)	36

Chart (1990)	Peak Position
US Top Country Albums (Billboard)	14

== Certifications ==
Certifications for "White Limozeen"
Region	Certification	Certified units/sales
United States (RIAA)	Gold	500,000^{^}
^{^} Shipments figures based on certification alone.

== Singles ==
In anticipation of the album, in April 1989 the lead single, "Why'd You Come in Here Lookin' Like That" was released. It was a #1 Country single, and was given a music video.

After the album showed to be doing well, in July 1989 the second single, "Yellow Roses" was released, also becoming a #1 Country single.

November 1989 saw the third single, "He's Alive" being released. An accompanying video was released, consisting of footage of Parton's performance of the song on the CMA Awards show, earlier that month. It was a cover of Don Francisco's song of the same name. The single peaked at # 39.

In February 1990 she released the fourth single, "Time for Me to Fly", a bluegrass cover of REO Speedwagon's 1978 hit of the same name. Like its immediate predecessor, the single also peaked at #39.

In May 1990 the fifth single, the title track, was released, also without promotion, as by this point she was recording a holiday album, Home for Christmas. It reached #29 on the country singles charts.

A sixth single, "Slow Healing Heart", was released that same year, but is rarely known, and it was the final bit of promotion for this album. The single did not chart.

== Production ==
- Produced By Ricky Skaggs
- Engineered By Tom Harding, Scott Hendricks, Pat Hutchinson, Doug Johnson, George Massenburg, Mike Poole & Ed Seay
- Assistant Engineers: Jeff Giedt, Rodney Good, Brad Jones
- Mixing: Doug Johnson
- Mastering: Denny Purcell
- Engineer Outboard Gear Service: Studio Equipment Rental (co owner: Pamela M Jones)

== Personnel ==
- Dolly Parton - vocals
- Eddie Bayers - drums
- Farrell Morris, Ricky Skaggs - percussion
- Mike Brignardello, Craig Nelson - bass guitar
- Barry Beckett, David Huntsinger, John Barlow Jarvis - keyboards, piano, DX-7
- Mark Casstevens, Steve Gibson, Vince Gill, Albert Lee, Mac McAnally, Ricky Skaggs, Reggie Young - guitar
- Stuart Duncan, Ricky Skaggs - fiddle
- Paul Franklin - pedabro
- Terry Crisp, Lloyd Green, John Hughey, Paul Franklin - steel guitar
- Béla Fleck - banjo
- David Huntsinger - piano
- Ricky Skaggs - mandolin
- Bob Mason - cello
- Bobby Taylor - oboe
- Jo-El Sonnier - Cajun accordion
- Nashville String Machine - strings
- Bergen White - string arrangements
- Curtis Young, Liana Young, Lisa Silver, Bernard Peyton, Kim Morrison, Vicki Hampton, Yvonne Hodges, Richard Dennison - backing vocals
