= We Used To =

Single by Dolly Parton

from the album Dolly
- B-side: "My Heart Started Breaking"
- Released: September 8, 1975
- Recorded: 1975
- Genre: Country
- Length: 3:12
- Label: RCA Victor
- Songwriter: Dolly Parton
- Producer: Porter Wagoner

Dolly Parton singles chronology
"The Seeker" (1975)	"We Used To" (1975)	"All I Can Do" (1976)

"We Used To" is a song written and recorded by American country music artist Dolly Parton. It was released in September 1975 as the second from the album Dolly. The song reached #9 on the U.S. country singles charts. The song featured a guitar pattern at the opening which put a number of critics and fans in mind of the Led Zeppelin classic "Stairway to Heaven". (Parton, who has stated a number of times that she is a longtime Led Zeppelin fan, eventually covered "Stairway" in 2002.)

== Chart performance ==
Chart (1975)	Peak position
US Hot Country Songs (Billboard)	9
Canadian RPM Country Tracks	4

Chart (1985)	Peak position
Netherlands (Single Top 100)	49
