= Love Is Like a Butterfly (song) =

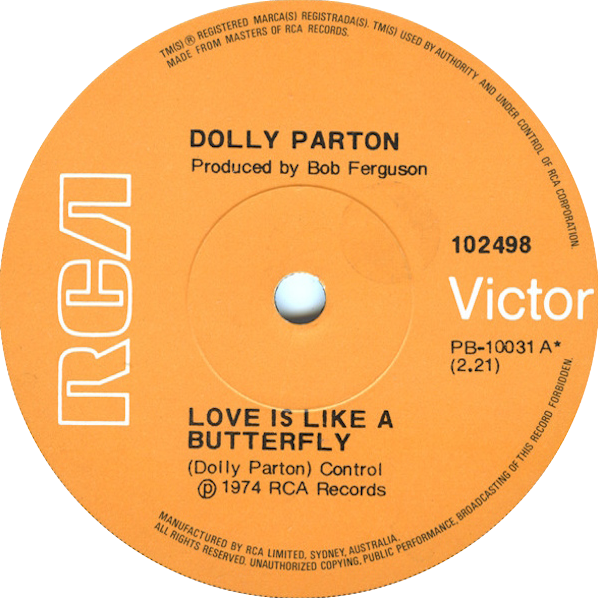
- Australian 7" label

Single by Dolly Parton

from the album Love Is Like a Butterfly
- B-side: "Sacred Memories"
- Released: August 5, 1974
- Recorded: July 16, 1974; RCA Studio B, Nashville, Tennessee
- Genre: Country
- Length: 2:22
- Label: RCA Victor
- Songwriter: Dolly Parton
- Producer: Bob Ferguson

Dolly Parton singles chronology
"I Will Always Love You" (1974)	"Love Is Like a Butterfly" (1974)	"The Bargain Store" (1975)

"Love Is Like a Butterfly" is a song written and recorded by American country music artist Dolly Parton and released in August 1974 as the first single and title track from the album Love Is Like a Butterfly. It was her overall fourth number one on the country chart as a solo artist (and her third consecutive number one). The single stayed at number one for one week and spent a total of twelve weeks on the country chart.

== Personnel ==
- Dolly Parton — vocals
- Jimmy Colvard, Dave Kirby, Bruce Osbon, Bobby Thompson — guitars
- Bobby Dyson — bass
- Larrie Londin — drums
- Jerry Smith — piano
- Stu Basore — steel guitar
- The Lea Jane Singers — background vocals

== Chart performance ==
Chart (1974)	Peak position
Australia (Kent Music Report)	55
US Hot Country Songs (Billboard)	1
US Bubbling Under Hot 100 (Billboard)	5
US Adult Contemporary (Billboard)	38
Canadian RPM Country Tracks	2

== Popular culture ==
- Parton used "Love Is Like a Butterfly" as the opening theme for her 1976–77 TV variety show Dolly! She also uses a butterfly as the "W" in the trade dress for her Dollywood theme park.
- A version sung by Clare Torry was used as the theme to 1978–83 BBC sitcom Butterflies.
- On November 27, 2012, Parton and Stephen Colbert performed it together on The Colbert Report.
