= Something Special (Dolly Parton album) =

Studio album by Dolly Parton
- Released: August 22, 1995
- Recorded: 1995
- Studios: Nightingale Studio (Nashville); Sound Emporium (Nashville); Doghouse Studio (Nashville); Woodland Digital (Nashville)
- Genre: Country
- Length: 34:05
- Labels: Columbia; Blue Eye
- Producer: Steve Buckingham

Dolly Parton chronology
| Heartsongs: Live from Home (1994) | Something Special (1995) | I Will Always Love You and Other Greatest Hits (1996) |

Singles from Something Special
- 1. "I Will Always Love You" Released: November 1995

Something Special is the thirty-third solo studio album by American singer-songwriter Dolly Parton. It was released on August 22, 1995, by Columbia Records and Blue Eye Records. In addition to seven new Parton compositions, the album includes updated versions of three classics from Parton's repertoire: "Jolene", "The Seeker", and "I Will Always Love You", the latter of which was performed as a duet with Vince Gill. The Gill duet, Parton's third recording of the song, reached number 15 on the Billboard Hot Country Singles & Tracks chart, becoming Parton's highest charting single in four years. Additionally, it was named "Vocal Event of the Year" by the Country Music Association.

== Release and promotion ==
The album was released on August 22, 1995, by Columbia Records and Blue Eye Records.

To promote the album Parton made several television appearances. She appeared on the Grand Ole Opry on August 26 and performed "Something Special", "Jolene", and "I Will Always Love You" with Vince Gill. Following this performance, radio stations began giving Parton and Gill's duet of "I Will Always Love You" unsolicited airplay, causing it to debut on the Billboard Hot Country Singles & Tracks chart. Parton appeared on The Tonight Show with Jay Leno on August 31 and performed "Something Special". She and Vince Gill performed "I Will Always Love You" on the 29th Annual Country Music Association Awards on October 4. Following their performance at the CMA Awards, the song was officially released as a single in November.

== Critical reception ==
Professional ratings
Review scores
| Source | Rating |
|---|---|
| AllMusic | 3/5 stars |
| The Encyclopedia of Popular Music | 3/5 stars |

Upon its release, the album was met with mixed reviews from critics. A review from Billboard said that "it's a bit distressing when the highlights of a new Dolly Parton album are new recordings of old material." The review went on to praise the re-recording of "I Will Always Love You" with Vince Gill, but felt that the "recent material pales here when contrasted with that duet and ... older Parton compositions. The review concluded by saying, "The new stuff is good. The old stuff is great."

Stephen Thomas Erlewine of AllMusic gave the album three out of five stars, describing the album as "something of a mixed bag." Like the review from Billboard, Erlewine also felt that "the newer songs are fine, [but] they pale in comparison with [Parton's] classics." He went on to say that "if the new songs had been included on an album that only featured new material, they would have formed a strong record, but they take a back seat to Parton's older songs, which are more inspired and better-written." He concluded his review by saying that "the album provides several fine moments, even if it doesn't rank among her best works."

== Track listing ==
All tracks are written by Dolly Parton, except "Teach Me to Trust" written by Dolly Parton and Gene Golden.

| No. | Title | Length |
|---|---|---|
| 1. | "Crippled Bird" | 3:44 |
| 2. | "Something Special" | 3:06 |
| 3. | "Change" | 3:41 |
| 4. | "I Will Always Love You" (duet with Vince Gill) | 3:17 |
| 5. | "Green-Eyed Boy" | 3:53 |
| 6. | "Speakin' of the Devil" | 3:15 |
| 7. | "Jolene" | 3:42 |
| 8. | "No Good Way of Saying Good-Bye" | 2:57 |
| 9. | "The Seeker" | 3:03 |
| 10. | "Teach Me to Trust" | 3:27 |
| Total length: | | 34:05 |

== Personnel ==
- Bob Bailey – background vocals
- Eddie Bayers – drums
- Steve Buckingham – acoustic guitar
- Margie Cates – background vocals
- Suzanne Cox – background vocals
- Richard Dennison – background vocals
- Stuart Duncan – fiddle
- Paul Franklin – steel guitar
- Steve Gibson – acoustic guitar
- Vince Gill – duet vocals on "I Will Always Love You"
- Owen Hale – drums
- Vicki Hampton – background vocals
- Yvonne Hodges – background vocals
- Paul Hollowell – piano
- David Hungate – bass guitar
- Carl Jackson – background vocals
- Alison Krauss – background vocals
- Sonny Landreth – slide guitar
- Randy McCormick – organ
- Terry McMillan – percussion, shaker
- Brent Mason – acoustic guitar, electric guitar
- Jimmy Mattingly – fiddle
- Steve Nathan – piano
- Louis Dean Nunley – background vocals
- Dale Oehler – conductor, string arrangements
- Dolly Parton – lead vocals
- Don Potter – acoustic guitar
- Chris Rodriguez – background vocals
- Matt Rollings – organ, piano
- Brent Rowan – electric guitar
- Steuart Smith – acoustic guitar
- Duawne Starling – background vocals
- Pam Tillis – background vocals
- Steve Turner – drums
- Paul Uhrig – bass guitar
- Reggie Young – electric guitar

== Charts ==
=== Weekly charts ===
| Chart (1995) | Peak position |
|---|---|
| Canadian Country Albums (RPM) | 7 |
| US Billboard 200 | 54 |
| US Top Country Albums (Billboard) | 10 |
| UK Country Albums (Official Charts) | 6 |
| US Cashbox Country Albums | 10 |
| US Cash Box Top Albums | 61 |

=== Year-end charts ===
| Chart (1995) | Position |
|---|---|
| US Top Country Albums (Billboard) | 73 |
