= The Bargain Store =

Studio album by Dolly Parton
- Released: February 17, 1975
- Recorded: December 1974 – January 1975
- Studio: RCA Studios (Nashville)
- Genre: Country
- Length: 25:42
- Label: RCA Victor
- Producers: Bob Ferguson, Porter Wagoner

Dolly Parton chronology
Love Is Like a Butterfly (1974)	The Bargain Store (1975)	Best of Dolly Parton (1975)

Singles from The Bargain Store
- 1. "The Bargain Store" Released: January 13, 1975

Professional ratings
Review scores
Source	Rating
Allmusic	4.5/5 stars
The Encyclopedia of Popular Music	4/5 stars

The Bargain Store is the fifteenth solo studio album by American entertainer Dolly Parton. It was released on February 17, 1975, by RCA Victor. In the Parton-penned title track, one of her best-known compositions, she used worn, second-hand merchandise in a discount store as a metaphor for a woman damaged by an ill-fated relationship. The song was dropped from several country stations' playlists when programmers mistook the line "you can easily afford the price" as a thinly veiled reference to prostitution. Despite the decrease in airplay, the song nonetheless topped the U.S. country singles charts in April 1975.

The album was largely made up of Parton's own compositions but also contained Merle Haggard's "You'll Always Be Special to Me". Haggard would cover Parton's "Kentucky Gambler" later in 1975.

The album was re-released for the first time in December 2013. It was made available as a digital download on iTunes. This is the first time that eight of the songs ("When I'm Gone", "The Only Hand You'll Need to Hold", "I Want to Be What You Need", "Love to Remember", "You'll Always Be Special to Me", "He Would Know" and "I'll Never Forget") have been made available outside of the original LP, cassette and eight-track releases of the album.

== Track listing ==
All songs written by Dolly Parton unless otherwise noted.

Side one
No.	Title	Writer(s)	Recording date	Length
1.	"The Bargain Store"		December 4, 1974	2:44
2.	"Kentucky Gambler"		May 23, 1973	2:40
3.	"When I'm Gone"		December 11, 1974	2:16
4.	"The Only Hand You'll Need to Hold"		December 4, 1974	2:12
5.	"On My Mind Again"	Porter Wagoner	December 11, 1974	2:51

Side two
No.	Title	Writer(s)	Recording date	Length
6.	"I Want to Be What You Need"		December 9, 1974	2:42
7.	"Love to Remember"		December 11, 1974	2:33
8.	"You’ll Always Be Special to Me"	Merle Haggard	December 11, 1974	2:23
9.	"He Would Know"		December 9, 1974	2:34
10.	"I’ll Never Forget"		December 11, 1974	2:47

== Charts ==
Chart performance for The Bargain Store
Chart (1975)	Peak position
US Top Country Albums (Billboard)	9
US Cashbox Country Albums	4
