= Clyde T. Francisco =

American scholar and academic

Clyde Taylor Francisco (June 2, 1916 – August 21, 1981) was born in Virgilina, Virginia and was the John R. Sampey Professor of Old Testament Interpretation at Southern Baptist Theological Seminary in Louisville, Kentucky. He taught Old Testament for over 30 years and his book titled Introducing the Old Testament remained in print for more than 25 years.

== Early life and education ==
He was born in Virgilina, Virginia and graduated with honors from the University of Richmond before serving several churches in Virginia and Kentucky. He received his Th.M. degree in 1942 and Th.D.degree in 1944 from The Southern Baptist Theological Seminary. Upon graduation, he remained at Southern Seminary as an instructor in Old Testament.

== Family ==
His son Don Francisco is a Christian singer/songwriter.

== Legacy ==
The Southern Baptist Theological Seminary offers an annual Clyde T. Francisco Preaching Award.

== Works ==
- Introducing the Old Testament
- Studies in Jeremiah
- Commentary on Genesis
