= Love Is Like a Butterfly =

Studio album by Dolly Parton
- Released: September 16, 1974
- Recorded: June – July 1974
- Studio: RCA Studio B (Nashville)
- Genre: Country
- Length: 26:40
- Label: RCA Nashville
- Producer: Bob Ferguson

Dolly Parton chronology
Porter 'n' Dolly (1974)	Love Is Like a Butterfly (1974)	The Bargain Store (1975)

Singles from Love Is Like a Butterfly
- 1. "Love Is Like a Butterfly" Released: August 5, 1974

Love Is Like a Butterfly is the fourteenth solo studio album by American entertainer Dolly Parton. It was released on September 16, 1974, by RCA Victor. The title track was the third consecutive single to reach number one on the U.S. country charts for Parton. For the few years before her pop chart success, "Butterfly" was considered Parton's signature song and was used as the theme song for her 1976 syndicated music series Dolly!. The album peaked at number seven on the country albums chart. The album was re-released on iTunes in March 2014 the same day as her 2014 album Blue Smoke was made available for pre-order.

== Critical reception ==
Professional ratings
Review scores
Source	Rating
AllMusic	3/5 stars
Christgau's Record Guide	B
The Encyclopedia of Popular Music	4/5 stars

In a positive review of the album, Billboard said, "Beginning with her beautiful hit single, Miss Parton sings a variety of songs which demonstrate her stature in this business. It's an outstanding album, full of great songs, most of which she wrote herself, and covering a great many subjects. Some are ballads, some up-tempo, and she handles everything with grace." The review noted "If I Could Cross Your Mind", "Gettin' Happy", and "Once Upon a Memory" as the best tracks on the album. The review concluded with a note to record dealers, saying that the album has "an outstanding cover, which merits prominent display."

Another positive review of the album from Cashbox said, "Whether with Porter or by herself the inimitable songbird Dolly Parton will have an avid following [in] whatever she chooses to do or whomever she chooses to sing with. Her voice is light, airy, and deliciously unique. She has a vocal style and timbre that truly set her apart from the other female contenders. The collection of material is representative and Dolly carries all the tunes off with superb excellence. Included with the title track which is her present charted single is "If I Cross Your Mind" that is a ballad of prime degree exemplifying Dolly's very special warble. The review noted "Take Me Back", "Sacred Memories", and "Blackie, Kentucky" as the best tracks on the album.

== Track listing ==
All songs are written by Dolly Parton, except where indicated.

Side one
No.	Title	Writer(s)	Recording date	Length
1.	"Love Is Like a Butterfly"		July 16, 1974	2:22
2.	"If I Cross Your Mind"	Porter Wagoner	July 18, 1974	2:40
3.	"My Eyes Can Only See You"		July 16, 1974	2:48
4.	"Take Me Back"		July 16, 1974	2:37
5.	"Blackie, Kentucky"		July 16, 1974	3:30

Side two
No.	Title	Writer(s)	Recording date	Length
6.	"Gettin' Happy"		July 16, 1974	2:38
7.	"You're the One That Taught Me How to Swing"		July 18, 1974	2:07
8.	"Highway Headin' South"	Wagoner	July 18, 1974	2:05
9.	"Once Upon a Memory"		July 16, 1974	3:11
10.	"Sacred Memories"		September 1, 1972	2:42

== Charts ==
Chart performance for Love Is Like a Butterfly
Chart (1974)	Peak position
US Top Country Albums (Billboard)	7
US Cashbox Country Albums	1
