= Dolly (album) =

Dolly: The Seeker & We Used To

Studio album by Dolly Parton
- Released: September 15, 1975
- Recorded: April 16, 1971–December 9, 1974
- Studios: RCA Studio A (Nashville, Tennessee)
- Genre: Country
- Length: 31:26
- Label: RCA Victor
- Producer: Porter Wagoner

Dolly Parton chronology
Say Forever You'll Be Mine (1975)	Dolly: The Seeker & We Used To (1975)	All I Can Do (1976)

Singles from Dolly
- 1. "The Seeker" Released: May 19, 1975; 2. "We Used To" Released: September 8, 1975

Dolly: The Seeker & We Used To is the sixteenth solo studio album by American entertainer Dolly Parton. It was released on September 15, 1975, by RCA Victor. It was the second album where Parton was the sole songwriter, the first being My Tennessee Mountain Home.

== Critical reception ==
Professional ratings
Review scores
Source	Rating
AllMusic	2.5/5 stars
Christgau's Record Guide	C+
The Encyclopedia of Popular Music	3/5 stars

Billboard published a review of the album in the issue dated September 27, 1975, calling the album "a collection of Dolly's favorite love songs. She wrote all of the tunes and is one of the better writers around. All beautiful songs, beautifully done." Billboard also named "Most of All Why", "Because I Love You" and "Only the Memory Remains" as the best cuts on the album.

In the October 4, 1975 issue, Cashbox said, "Produced and arranged by Porter Wagoner, this LP is a collection of love songs written by Dolly, most of them sad songs — songs of remembering lost love. Most are ballads with only a few uptempo cuts."

== Commercial performance ==
The album peaked at No. 14 on the US Billboard Top Country Albums chart.

The album's first single, "The Seeker", peaked at No. 2 on the US Billboard Hot Country Singles chart and No. 105 on the US Billboard Hot 100. In Canada "The Seeker" peaked at No. 1 on the RPM Country Singles chart. The second single, "We Used To", peaked at No. 9 on the US Billboard Hot Country Singles chart and No. 4 on the Canadian RPM Country Singles chart.

== Track listing ==
All tracks are written by Dolly Parton.

Side one
No.	Title	Recording date	Length
1.	"We Used To"	December 9, 1974	3:14
2.	"The Love I Used to Call Mine"	December 26, 1973	2:50
3.	"My Heart Started Breaking"	April 16, 1971	3:23
4.	"Most of All, Why?"	May 24, 1974	3:03
5.	"Bobby's Arms"	December 1, 1973	2.40

Side two
No.	Title	Recording date	Length
1.	"The Seeker"	December 9, 1974	3:02
2.	"Hold Me"	February 1, 1973	2:36
3.	"Because I Love You"	unknown	2:16
4.	"Only the Memory Remains"	unknown	2:49
5.	"I'll Remember You as Mine"	August 22, 1972	2:48

== Personnel ==
Adapted from the album liner notes.

- Herb Burnette - art director
- Dennis Carney - photography
- The Lea Jane Singers - vocal accompaniment
- Bill McElhiney - orchestration
- The Nashville Edition - vocal accompaniment
- Dolly Parton - lead vocals
- Tom Pick - recording engineer
- Roy Shockley - recording technician
- Porter Wagoner - producer, arrangements

== Charts ==
Chart performance for Dolly
Chart (1975)	Peak position
US Top Country Albums (Billboard)	14
US Cashbox Country Albums	15

Singles

Year	Single	Chart	Peak position
1975	"The Seeker"	US Hot Country Singles (Billboard)	2
1975	"The Seeker"	US Billboard Hot 100	105
1975	"The Seeker"	Canada Top Country Singles (RPM)	1
1975	"We Used To"	US Hot Country Singles (Billboard)	9
1975	"We Used To"	Canada Top Country Singles (RPM)	4
