= Eagle When She Flies =

Studio album by Dolly Parton
- Released: March 7, 1991
- Recorded: c. January 1991
- Studios: Nightengale Studio (Nashville); The Doghouse (Nashville)
- Genre: Country
- Length: 38:00
- Label: Columbia
- Producers: Steve Buckingham; Gary Smith; Dolly Parton (exec.)

Dolly Parton chronology
Home for Christmas (1990)	Eagle When She Flies (1991)	Straight Talk (1992)

Singles from Eagle When She Flies
- 1. "Rockin' Years" Released: February 4, 1991; 2. "Silver and Gold" Released: May 20, 1991; 3. "Eagle When She Flies" Released: September 16, 1991; 4. "Country Road" Released: January 6, 1992

Professional ratings
Review scores
Source	Rating
AllMusic	3/5 stars
Calgary Herald	A
Robert Christgau	(neither)
The Encyclopedia of Popular Music	3/5 stars

Eagle When She Flies is the thirty-first solo studio album by American singer-songwriter Dolly Parton. It was released on March 7, 1991, by Columbia Records. The album was produced by Steve Buckingham and Gary Smith, with Parton serving as executive producer. It continues Parton's return to mainstream country sounds following 1989's White Limozeen. The album features collaborations with Lorrie Morgan and Ricky Van Shelton, with additional supporting vocals provided by Vince Gill and Emmylou Harris.

The album was a commercial success, becoming Parton's first solo album to peak at number one on the Billboard Top Country Albums chart since 1980s 9 to 5 and Odd Jobs and her last number one charted album until her 2016 album Pure & Simple. It was certified Platinum in by the RIAA in 1992. The album spawned four singles, the most successful being "Rockin' Years" with Ricky Van Shelton, which topped the Billboard Hot Country Singles & Tracks chart. In support of the album, Parton embarked on the Eagle When She Flies Tour, her only concert tour of the 1990s.

== Release and promotion ==
The album was released March 7, 1991, on CD, cassette, and LP.

Dolly Parton's duet with Shelton, "Rockin' Years", topped the country charts, and the follow-up single co-written by Carl Perkins, "Silver and Gold", was a #15 country single. Rounding out the hit singles was the title song "Eagle When She Flies", which only reached a #33 peak, despite spending 20 weeks on the Billboard Country Singles chart. Her duet with Lorrie Morgan, "Best Woman Wins", appeared simultaneously on Lorrie Morgan's 1991 album Something in Red. She co-wrote the song "Family" with Carl Perkins and "Wildest Dreams" with Mac Davis.

== Critical reception ==
Frank King from Calgary Herald wrote, "Hot damn, she's back. Just when the world is ready to write off Dolly as a cupie doll incapable of anything but candy fluff pop albums and silly duets with Kenny Rogers, she wipes us out with an inspiring, heart-on-your-sleeve country classic. The guest list - Vince Gill, Patty Loveless, Emmylou Harris, Alison Krauss - is impressive, but it's Dolly that shines from start to finish. Most of the 11 tracks are self-penned and drip with honest-to-goodness emotion. Makes a fella proud to slide on his cowboy boots and declare he finally likes Dolly for more than her pin-up appearance."

Neal Broverman from The Advocate described the album's song Family-which contained the lyrics "Some are preachers / some are gay / some are addicts, drunks and strays / But not a one is turned away when it's family"- as "very progressive" for its time.

== Commercial performance ==
The album also topped the U.S. country albums charts, Parton's first solo album to reach the top in a decade (and her last to do so until 2016) and reached #24 on the pop albums charts. The album spent 73 weeks on the Billboard Top Country Albums chart. It was her first solo studio album to reach number one album in the United States after 1980's 9 to 5 and Odd Jobs. The album's single week at number one interrupted what would otherwise have been an unbroken run of over 14 months in the top spot for Garth Brooks.

The album sold 74,000 copies in its first week. It ended up being certified Platinum by the Recording Industry Association of America. The album has sold 1.14 million copies as of July 2016.

== Reissues ==
In 2009, Sony Music reissued Eagle When She Flies in a triple-feature CD set with White Limozeen and Slow Dancing with the Moon.

== Track listing ==
Eagle When She Flies track listing
No.	Title	Writer(s)	Length
1.	"If You Need Me"	Dolly Parton	2:44
2.	"Rockin' Years" (duet with Ricky Van Shelton)	Floyd Parton	3:25
3.	"Country Road"	D. Parton; Gary Scruggs	3:27
4.	"Silver and Gold"	Carl Perkins; Gregg Perkins; Stan Perkins	3:54
5.	"Eagle When She Flies"	D. Parton	3:11
6.	"Best Woman Wins" (duet with Lorrie Morgan)	D. Parton	3:08
7.	"What a Heartache"	D. Parton	3:32
8.	"Runaway Feelin'"	D. Parton	2:56
9.	"Dreams Do Come True"	Bill Owens	3:26
10.	"Family"	D. Parton; C. Perkins	3:47
11.	"Wildest Dreams"	D. Parton; Mac Davis	4:30
Total length:			38:00

== Personnel ==
Adapted from the album liner notes.

- Dolly Parton – lead vocals
- The Mighty Fine Band:
  - Mike Davis – organ
  - Richard Dennison – background vocals
  - Jimmy Mattingly – fiddle, mandolin
  - Jennifer O'Brien – background vocals
  - Gary Smith – piano, keyboards
  - Howard Smith – background vocals
  - Steve Turner – drums
  - Paul Uhrig – bass
  - Bruce Watkins – acoustic guitar
  - Kent Wells – electric guitar

Additional musicians

- Sam Bacco – percussion
- Romantic Roy Huskey – upright bass
- Mark Casstevens – acoustic guitar, mandolin
- Paddy Corcoran – acoustic guitar on "If You Need Me"
- Glen Duncan – fiddle
- Paul Franklin – steel, dobro
- Steve Gibson – guitar, mandolin
- Carl Jackson – acoustic guitar on "If You Need Me"
- Joey Miskulin – accordion
- Mark O'Connor – fiddle on "What a Heartache"
- Allisa Jones Wall – hammer dulcimer

Additional vocalists

- Lea Jane Berinati – background vocals
- Paddy Corcoran – harmony vocals on "If You Need Me"
- Joy Gardner – background vocals
- Vince Gill – harmony vocals on "Silver and Gold"
- Vicki Hampton – background vocals
- Emmylou Harris – harmony vocals on "Country Road"
- Carl Jackson – harmony vocals on "If You Need Me"
- The Kid Connection – additional background vocals on "Family"
- Alison Krauss – harmony vocals on "If You Need Me"
- Patty Loveless – harmony vocals on "Country Road"
- Lewis Nunley – background vocals
- John Wesley Ryles – background vocals
- Lisa Silver – background vocals
- Harry Stinson – harmony vocals on "Silver and Gold"
- Dennis Wilson – background vocals
- Curtis Young – background vocals

Production

- Joe Bogan – additional engineering
- Steve Buckingham – producer
- Ray Bunch – string arrangements
- Robert Charles – assistant engineer
- Richard Dennison – vocal supervision
- Javelina East – string recording
- Chrissy Follmar – assistant engineer
- Carlos Grier – digital editing
- Larry Jeffries – assistant engineer
- Brad Jones – assistant engineer
- John Kunz – engineering assistant, mixing assistant
- Sean Londin – assistant engineer
- Gary Paczosa – engineering, mixing
- John David Parker – assistant engineer
- Dolly Parton – executive producer
- Denny Purcell – mastering
- Gary Smith – producer

Other personnel

- David Blair – hair
- Tony Chase – fashion, styling
- Rachel Dennison – makeup
- Sandy Gallin for Gallin-Morey Associates – management
- Bill Johnson – art direction
- Randee St. Nicholas – photographer
- Jodi Lynn Miller – design assistant

== Chart performance ==
Album

Chart (1991)	Peak position
Australia (ARIA Charts)	185
UK Country Albums Chart (Music Week)	1
U.S. Billboard Top Country Albums	1
U.S. Billboard 200	24
US Cashbox Country Albums	2
US Cash Box Top Albums	68

Album (Year-End)

Chart (1991)	Peak Position
US Top Country Albums (Billboard)	13
US Billboard 200	82

Chart (1992)	Peak Position
US Top Country Albums (Billboard)	51

== Certifications ==
Region	Certification	Certified units/sales
Canada (Music Canada)	Gold	50,000^{^}
United States (RIAA)	Platinum	1,000,000^{^}
^{^} Shipments figures based on certification alone.
