= Yellow Roses (Dolly Parton song) =

- Cassette single cover art

Single by Dolly Parton

from the album White Limozeen
- B-side: "Wait 'Till I Get You Home"
- Released: July 31, 1989
- Recorded: 1989
- Genre: Country
- Length: 3:55
- Label: Columbia
- Songwriter: Dolly Parton
- Producer: Ricky Skaggs

Dolly Parton singles chronology
"Why'd You Come in Here Lookin' Like That" (1989)	"Yellow Roses" (1989)	"He's Alive" (1989)

"Yellow Roses" is a song written and recorded by American country music artist Dolly Parton. It was released in July 1989 as the second single from the album White Limozeen. The song was Parton's 23rd number one country single. The single went to number one for one week and spent a total of 26 weeks on the country chart.

== Chart performance ==
Chart (1989)	Peak position
Canada Country Singles (RPM)	1
US Hot Country Songs (Billboard)	1

=== Year-end charts ===
Chart (1989)	Position
Canada Country Tracks (RPM)	17
US Country Songs (Billboard)	34
