= The Bargain Store (song) =

- Side A of the US single

Single by Dolly Parton

from the album The Bargain Store
- B-side: "I'll Never Forget"
- Released: January 13, 1975
- Genre: Country
- Length: 2:42
- Label: RCA Victor
- Songwriter: Dolly Parton
- Producer: Bob Ferguson

Dolly Parton singles chronology
"Love Is Like a Butterfly" (1974)	"The Bargain Store" (1975)	"The Seeker" (1975)

"The Bargain Store" is a song written and recorded by American country music artist Dolly Parton. It was released in January 1975 as the first single and title track from the album The Bargain Store. The song was Parton's fifth number one on the country chart as a solo artist. The song stayed at number one for a single week and spent nine weeks on the country chart.

== Content ==
Worn, second-hand merchandise in a discount store is used as a metaphor for a woman emotionally damaged by an ill-fated relationship. The song was dropped from a number of country stations' playlists when programmers mistook the line "you can easily afford the price" as a thinly veiled reference to prostitution.

== Chart performance ==
Chart (1975)	Peak position
US Hot Country Songs (Billboard)	1
US Adult Contemporary (Billboard)	35
Canadian RPM Country Tracks	3
