= Eagle When She Flies (song) =

Single by Dolly Parton

from the album Eagle When She Flies
- B-side: "Wildest Dreams"
- Released: September 16, 1991
- Genre: Country
- Length: 3:10
- Label: Columbia
- Songwriter: Dolly Parton
- Producers: Steve Buckingham, Gary Smith

Dolly Parton singles chronology
"Silver and Gold" (1991)	"Eagle When She Flies" (1991)	"Country Road" (1992)

"Eagle When She Flies" is a song written and recorded by American country music artist Dolly Parton. It was released in September 1991 as the third single from the album Eagle When She Flies. The song reached number 33 on the Billboard Hot Country Singles & Tracks chart.

== Background and content ==
Parton wrote "Eagle When She Flies" in June 1989 as the theme for the film Steel Magnolias, citing the film as the inspiration for the line "Gentle as the sweet magnolia, strong as steel, her faith and pride." While the film did not use a theme song of any kind, Parton considers "Eagle When She Flies" one of her best songs.

On a list of the 50 best Dolly Parton songs, Rolling Stone magazine ranked "Eagle When She Flies" at number 21, calling it a "soaring-yet-delicate" feminist anthem"

== Chart performance ==
Chart (1991)	Peak position
Canada Country Singles (RPM)	9
US Hot Country Songs (Billboard)	33
