= Silver and Gold (Dolly Parton song) =

Single by Dolly Parton

from the album Eagle When She Flies
- B-side: "Runaway Feelin'"
- Released: May 20, 1991
- Genre: Country
- Length: 3:45
- Label: Columbia
- Songwriters: Carl Perkins, Greg Perkins, Stan Perkins
- Producers: Steve Buckingham, Gary Smith

Dolly Parton singles chronology
"Rockin' Years" (1991)	"Silver and Gold" (1991)	"Eagle When She Flies" (1991)

"Silver and Gold" is a song recorded by the American country music artist Dolly Parton. It was released in May 1991 as the second single from the album Eagle When She Flies.

== Background ==
The song reached number 15 on the Billboard Hot Country Singles & Tracks chart. The song was written by Carl Perkins, Greg Perkins and Stan Perkins.

== Chart performance ==
Chart (1991)	Peak position
Canada Country Singles (RPM)	7
US Hot Country Songs (Billboard)	15

=== Year-end charts ===
Chart (1991)	Position
Canada Country Tracks (RPM)	87
