= Home for Christmas (Dolly Parton album) =

Studio album by Dolly Parton
- Released: September 11, 1990
- Recorded: July 1990
- Studio: Nightingale Studios (Nashville)
- Genre: Christmas; country
- Length: 31:38
- Label: Columbia
- Producer: Gary Smith; Dolly Parton (exec.)

Dolly Parton chronology
White Limozeen (1989)	Home for Christmas (1990)	Eagle When She Flies (1991)

Parton's Christmas chronology
Once Upon a Christmas (1984)	Home for Christmas (1990)	A Holly Dolly Christmas (2020)

Home for Christmas is the thirtieth solo studio album by American singer-songwriter Dolly Parton. It was released on September 11, 1990, by Columbia Records. The album was produced by Gary Smith, with Parton serving as executive producer. It is Parton's second Christmas album, following 1984's Once Upon a Christmas with Kenny Rogers. Unlike Once Upon a Christmas, which featured a number of original songs, Home for Christmas is made up of ten Christmas standards. The album's release was accompanied by an ABC television special, Dolly Parton: Christmas at Home. The album was certified Gold by the RIAA in 1994.

== Release and promotion ==
The album was released September 11, 1990, on CD and cassette. It also received a limited LP release exclusively in the Netherlands.

There were no singles released from the album. Instead, Parton promoted the album's release with a television special titled Dolly Parton: Christmas at Home. It aired December 21, 1990, on ABC. The special features footage of Parton in the studio recording the album, visiting and singing with her family at the Tennessee Mountain Home where she grew up, as well as performances filmed at a church and various other locations in the Smoky Mountains.

== Critical reception ==
Professional ratings
Review scores
Source	Rating
AllMusic	2/5 stars

Thom Floyd from AllMusic gave the album two out of five stars. He criticized the album's production as "a bit too slick," but said that Parton's "irrepressible charm" makes it a "reasonably enjoyable holiday record."

== Commercial performance ==
The album debuted and peaked at number 74 on the Billboard Top Country Albums chart, spending a total of two weeks on the chart. The album was certified Gold by the RIAA on December 27, 1994.

== Track listing ==
Home for Christmas track listing
No.	Title	Writer(s)	Length
1.	"First Noel"	Traditional	4:03
2.	"Santa Claus Is Coming to Town"	J. Fred Coots; Haven Gillespie	1:52
3.	"I'll Be Home for Christmas"	Kim Gannon; Walter Kent	3:13
4.	"Rudolph the Red-Nosed Reindeer"	Johnny Marks	3:25
5.	"Go Tell It on the Mountain"	Traditional	2:50
6.	"The Little Drummer Boy"	Katherine Kennicott Davis; Henry Onorati; Harry Simeone	4:34
7.	"We Three Kings"	Traditional	2:44
8.	"Jingle Bells"	James Lord Pierpont	1:55
9.	"O Little Town of Bethlehem"	Traditional	2:39
10.	"Joy to the World"	Traditional	4:23
Total length:			31:38

== Personnel ==
Adapted from the album liner notes.

- Dolly Parton – lead vocals (all tracks), background vocals (tracks 7, 9)
- The Mighty Fine Band:
  - Michael Davis – keyboards (tracks 1, 3, 6, 10), percussion (track 8)
  - Richard Dennison – background vocals (tracks 1–3, 5–6, 10)
  - Jimmy Mattingly – fiddle (tracks 2–4), mandolin (tracks 7–9)
  - Jennifer O'Brien – background vocals (tracks 1–3, 5–6, 10)
  - Gary Smith – piano (tracks 1–3, 5–6, 10), Hammond B3 organ (track 5), keyboards (track 6)
  - Howard Smith – background vocals (tracks 1–3, 5–6, 10)
  - Steve Turner – drums (tracks 1–3, 5–8, 10), percussion (tracks 2, 4, 8–9)
  - Paul Uhrig – acoustic bass (tracks 1–2, 7–9), bass (tracks 3, 5–6, 10)
  - Kent Wells – acoustic guitar (tracks 1–2), electric guitar (tracks 3, 5–7, 10)
  - Robert Williams – dobro (tracks 4, 8)

Additional musicians

- Stuart Duncan – mandolin (track 4), fiddle (track 9)
- Carl Jackson – acoustic guitar (all tracks)
- Michael Johnson – gut string guitar (track 3)
- Jack Smith – steel guitar (tracks 3, 5, 7)
- Alisha Jones Wall – Hammered dulcimer (tracks 7–8)

Additional background vocals

- Bob Bailey (tracks 5–6)
- Bobby Jones & Nashville (tracks 5–6)
  - Theresa J. Comer, Everett Drake, Nuana Dunlap, Gary E. Jenkins, Bobby Jones, Lenoria Ridley, Lawrence D. Thomison, Harry Watkins, Angela Wright
- The Christ Church Pentecostal Choir (track 10)
  - Jason Beddoe, Coby Coffman, Al Coleman, Melissa Coleman, Joy Gardner, Landy Gardner, Vicki Pointer, Rebekah Rayburn, Tanya Sykes, Mark Warren
- Carl Jackson (track 7)
- The New Salem Methodist Church Congregation (tracks 1, 10)
- Our Kids (tracks 4, 8)
  - Trent Ashcraft, Alyson Chance, Hannah Dennison, Vanessa Hollowell, Jake Hoover, Crystal Hunt, Amy Johnson, Gretchen Johnson, Cole Kiracofe, Ian Kiracofe, Bryan Seaver, Rebecca Seaver, Austin Smith, Brandon Smith, Tiffany Smith, David Turner, Katie Turner, Derek Wells, Dustin Wells

Production

- Michael Davis – recording assistant
- Richard Dennison – production assistant
- Chrissy Follmar – recording assistant
- Brad Jones – recording assistant
- Mark Kiracofe – production assistant
- John Kunz – recording assistant
- The Mighty Fine Band – arrangements
- Gary Paczaosa – recording, mixing
- Dolly Parton – executive producer
- Denny Purcell – mastering
- Gary Smith – producer

Other personnel

- Dennis Carney – photography
- Tony Chase – styling
- Rachel Dennison – makeup
- Cheryl Riddle – hair

== Charts ==
Chart (1990)	Peak position
US Top Catalog Albums (Billboard)	37
US Top Country Albums (Billboard)	74
US Top Holiday Albums (Billboard)	29

== Certifications ==
Region	Certification	Certified units/sales
United States (RIAA)	Gold	500,000^{^}
^{^} Shipments figures based on certification alone.
