= The Seeker (Dolly Parton song) =

Single by Dolly Parton

from the album Dolly
- B-side: "Love With Feeling"
- Released: May 19, 1975
- Recorded: December 9, 1974
- Genre: Country; gospel
- Length: 3:02; 3:14 (2007 edited reissue)
- Label: RCA Victor
- Songwriter: Dolly Parton
- Producer: Porter Wagoner

Dolly Parton singles chronology
"The Bargain Store" (1975)	"The Seeker" (1975)	"We Used To" (1976)

"The Seeker" is a song written and recorded by American country music artist Dolly Parton. It was released as the first single from Parton's 1975 album, Dolly, and was also a top ten single on the U.S. country charts. A spiritual, which Parton described as her "talk with God", the song was released as a single in July 1975, just missing the top spot on the U.S. country singles chart; it peaked at #2.

Two decades later, Parton rerecorded the song for her 1995 album Something Special. Nelly Furtado covered this song for the film The Year Dolly Parton Was My Mom. Merle Haggard who, in his 1981 autobiography, Sing Me Back Home, would confess his infatuation with Parton, also recorded the song. The British band The New Seekers recorded a version of the song in 1976.

== Chart performance ==
Weekly

Chart (1975)	Peak position
US Hot Country Songs (Billboard)	2
US Bubbling Under Hot 100 (Billboard)	5
Canadian RPM Country Tracks	1
US Cash Box Top 100	91

Year-End

Chart (1975)	Peak Position
US Hot Country Songs (Billboard)	35
