= Why'd You Come in Here Lookin' Like That =

Single by Dolly Parton

from the album White Limozeen
- B-side: "Wait 'Till I Get You Home"
- Released: April 24, 1989
- Genre: Country
- Length: 2:33
- Label: Columbia
- Songwriters: Bob Carlisle, Randy Thomas
- Producer: Ricky Skaggs

Dolly Parton singles chronology
"Make Love Work" (1988)	"Why'd You Come in Here Lookin' Like That" (1989)	"Yellow Roses" (1989)

"Why'd You Come in Here Lookin' Like That" is a song written by Bob Carlisle and Randy Thomas, and recorded by American country music artist Dolly Parton. It was released in April 1989 as the first single from the album White Limozeen. The song was Parton's 22nd number one on the country chart. The single went to number one for one week and spent a total of 20 weeks on the country chart.

Parton performed the song (along with the title track to the album) when she hosted Saturday Night Live on April 15, 1989.

The song has also been recorded as a duet by Jill Johnson and Nina Persson, released on the 2007 Jill Johnson cover album Music Row, which received much SR P4 airplay.

== Personnel ==
- Mark Casstevens, Steve Gibson, Albert Lee — guitar
- Mike Brignardello — bass
- Eddie Bayers — drums
- Barry Beckett — piano
- Béla Fleck – banjo
- Jo-El Sonnier — Cajun accordion
- Ricky Skaggs — acoustic guitar, mandolin, fiddle, triangle, harmony vocals
- Curtis Young — harmony vocals

== Chart performance ==
Chart (1989)	Peak position
Canada Country Singles (RPM)	1
US Hot Country Songs (Billboard)	1

=== Year-end charts ===
Chart (1989)	Position
Canada Country Tracks (RPM)	2
US Country Songs (Billboard)	43
