= Heartsongs: Live from Home =

Live album by Dolly Parton
- Released: September 27, 1994
- Recorded: April 23–24, 1994
- Genres: Country; gospel
- Length: 75:17
- Languages: English; Irish
- Labels: Columbia; Blue Eye
- Producer: Steve Buckingham

Dolly Parton chronology
Honky Tonk Angels (1993)	Heartsongs: Live from Home (1994)	Something Special (1995)

Singles from Heartsongs: Live from Home
- 1. "To Daddy" Released: October 3, 1994

Professional ratings
Review scores
Source	Rating
AllMusic	3/5 stars
The Encyclopedia of Popular Music	3/5 stars
Music Week	4/5 stars

Heartsongs: Live from Home is a live album by Dolly Parton, released on September 27, 1994. Recorded at a concert at Parton's theme park Dollywood, the album featured a mix of Parton originals and traditional folk songs. "To Daddy" was one of Parton's compositions that she had never previously released; Emmylou Harris, who recorded the song in 1978, took her recording of the song to the U.S. country singles top three). The campy "PMS Blues" went on to become a concert favorite, and received a fair amount of airplay as an album track. Mairéad Ní Mhaonaigh sang Irish vocals on "Barbara Allen".

"Heartsongs: Live From Home" spoke of Parton's desire to share her roots with her fans and celebrates the rich musical heritage of the Smoky Mountains. In an interview right before she recorded the album, Parton said,

"It's about my life and my roots and my growing up days… It's about the connection between the Scottish music, the Irish music, the English music, and the Welsh music that has been brought over to the Smoky Mountains that I grew up singing."

The original song "To Daddy" was a first-time recording for Parton, but had been released in an earlier version by Emmylou Harris.

== Track listing ==
No.	Title	Writer(s)	Length
1.	"Heartsong"	Dolly Parton	5:25
2.	"I'm Thinking Tonight of My Blue Eyes"	A.P. Carter	2:52
3.	"Mary of the Wild Moor"	Joseph W. Turner	4:06
4.	"In the Pines"	Traditional	2.42
5.	"My Blue Tears"	Dolly Parton	2:47
6.	"Applejack"	Dolly Parton	3:35
7.	"Coat of Many Colors"	Dolly Parton	4:21
8.	"Smoky Mountain Memories"	Dolly Parton	4:11
9.	"Night Train to Memphis"	Owen Bradley, Marvin Huges, Beasley Smith	2:42
10.	"What a Friend We Have in Jesus"	Charles Converse, Joseph Scriven	2:47
11.	"Hold Fast to the Right"	James D. Vaughan	2:32
12.	"Walter Henry Hagan"	Dolly Parton	3:40
13.	"Barbara Allen"	Traditional (English), Irish lyrics by Proinsias Ó Maonaigh (performed by Mairéad Ní Mhaonaigh)	5:24
14.	"Brave Little Soldier"	Dolly Parton	3:54
15.	"To Daddy"	Dolly Parton	2:55
16.	"True Blue"	Dolly Parton, James Newton Howard	3:06
17.	"Longer Than Always"	Dolly Parton	2:59
18.	"Wayfaring Stranger"	Traditional	3:09
19.	"My Tennessee Mountain Home"	Dolly Parton	3:22
20.	"Heartsong (Reprise)"	Dolly Parton	2:20
21.	"Cas Walker Theme"		0:58
22.	"Black Draught Theme"		1:24
23.	"PMS Blues"	Dolly Parton	5:36

== Personnel ==
- Altan - vocals
- Mairéad Ní Mhaonaigh - vocals, fiddle
- Frankie Kennedy - flute
- Ciaran Curran - bouzouki
- Daithi Gproule - guitar
- Ciaran Tourish - fiddle
- Dermot Bryne - accordion
- Jerry O'Sullivan - uilleann pipes
- Timothy White - photography
- Alison Krauss - harmony vocals, fiddle
- Suzanne Cox - harmony vocals
- Rhonda Vincent - harmony vocals
- Darrin Vincent - harmony vocals
- Carl Jackson - harmony vocals, guitar
- Randy Scruggs - guitar
- Harry Stinson - drums
- Roy Huskey Jr. - upright bass
- Jimmy Matthingly - fiddle
- David Lindley - Bronson acoustic steel, Hawaiian acoustic steel, dulcimer, autoharp, claw hammer banjo
- Adam Steffey - mandolin
- Ron Block - banjo
- Ronnie McCoury - mandolin
- Robbie Mercury - banjo
- Pig Robbing - piano
- Jerry Douglas - dobro
- Bruce Watkins - guitar
- Steve Buckingham - guitar
- Viktor Krauss - upright bass
- Richard Dennison - background vocals
- Jennifer O'Brien-Enoch - background vocals
- Lisa Silver - background vocals
- Louis Nunley - background vocals

== Chart performance ==
Chart (1994)	Peak position
Australian Albums (ARIA)	175
Canadian RPM Country Albums	7
UK Country Compilations (OCC)	6
US Billboard 200	87
US Top Country Albums (Billboard)	16
US Cash Box Top Albums	92
US Cashbox Country Albums	8
