= White Limozeen (song) =

Single by Dolly Parton

from the album White Limozeen
- B-side: "The Moon, the Stars and Me"
- Released: April 9, 1990
- Genre: Country
- Length: 4:17
- Label: Columbia
- Songwriters: Dolly Parton, Mac Davis
- Producer: Ricky Skaggs

Dolly Parton singles chronology
"Time for Me to Fly" (1990)	"White Limozeen" (1990)	"Love Is Strange" (1990)

"White Limozeen" is a song co-written and recorded by American country music artist Dolly Parton. It was released in April 1990 as the fifth single and title track from the album White Limozeen. The song reached #29 on the Billboard Hot Country Singles & Tracks chart. The song was written by Parton and Mac Davis.

== Chart performance ==
Chart (1990)	Peak position
US Hot Country Songs (Billboard)	29
Canadian RPM Country Tracks	47
