= Don Francisco (musician) =

American Christian singer and songwriter

- Born: February 28, 1946 (age 80); Louisville, Kentucky, U.S.
- Genre: Contemporary Christian
- Occupations: Singer; songwriter; musician
- Instrument: Vocals
- Years active: 1976–present

Don Francisco (born February 28, 1946) is an independent American singer, songwriter, and musician, specializing in the field of contemporary Christian music. He has won two Dove awards, 1980 song of the year (for "He's Alive"), and 1980 songwriter of the year.

== Background ==
Don Francisco was born on February 28, 1946, in Louisville, Kentucky, the son of a seminary professor, Clyde T. Francisco. He pursued a career in secular music before rededicating his life to God after an experience he believed to be supernatural. He has a son Uri (born 1974) with his first wife Karen; they divorced in 1994. He and his second wife, Wendy, who is also a recording artist in addition to being a graphic artist, live in Colorado.

== Career ==
In 1977 Don Francisco recorded "I Don't Care Where You've Been Sleeping" for the album Forgiven. It is one of the most uncompromising songs he has ever written and is considered by many to be one of his best songs. Benson Records re-released the original album Forgiven along with Got to Tell Somebody, putting them on a CD in 1988. The re-release left the song "I Don't Care Where You've Been Sleeping" off in order to fit both albums on a 70-minute CD. However, they released the album, Forgiven in the early 1990s with the song on it, along with all of the others, on their "Right Price" line of CDs.

Eventually after 1994, Francisco opted to operate independently which, while affording him more control, seems to have had no effect on his musical output or quality. Albums released after then have gradually increased session work and demonstrated a greater range of styles. In 2003, he released The Promises, which consists almost entirely of selected and paraphrased readings from the Bible. The disc is a collaboration with Don and Wendy.

== Musical style ==
Don Francisco's style is fairly distinctive, focusing on acoustic instruments barren of modern production techniques and concentrates on the narratives of the songs, using ballad styles or speaking through the music that interprets scriptural events or Biblical lessons, specifically with respect to the teachings of Jesus Christ and his messages of "unconditional love" ("I Don't Care Where You've Been Sleeping"), salvation ("Give Your Heart a Home"), and a lesson against religious self-righteousness and pharisaic condemnation ("Beautiful To Me"). As is the case with many singer-songwriters advocating a specific religious belief or philosophical viewpoint through music, he uses his adaptations and interpretations as the means to convey what he feels are the most important teachings of the Christian scriptures.

Some of Don Francisco's songs deal with what his site calls Churchianity, where church life habits replace practicing actual Christianity.

== Barred from the UK ==
In March 2009, Don Francisco was scheduled to perform in an Easter music program called "Why Good Friday?" in Poole, an English port in Dorset, but was barred from entering the United Kingdom after listing his occupation as "gospel singer" and failing to obtain a religious worker visa and a certificate of sponsorship, a new requirement of which the organizers of the concert were unaware. In 2009, the UK phased in an immigration system that increased scrutiny for religious workers traveling to the country.

== Discography ==
=== Studio albums ===
- 1976 Brother of the Son
- 1977 Forgiven
- 1979 Got to Tell Somebody
- 1981 The Traveler
- 1984 Holiness
- 1985 One Heart at a Time
- 1987 The Power
- 1988 High Praise
- 1991 Vision of the Valley
- 1992 Come Away
- 1994 Genesis and Job
- 1999 Grace on Grace
- 2001 Only Love is Spoken Here
- 2003 The Promises (Spoken Word)
- 2005 That I May Know You
- 2007 The Sower
- 2009 Let It Ride
- 2012 Carols on Guitar
- 2014 Forever My Friend

=== Live albums ===
- 1982 The Live Concert
- 1989 Live in the UK
- 2017 Acoustic Live Concert (two-CD)

=== Compilations ===
- 1985 The Poet
- 1991 The Early Works
- 1996 Word Pictures
- 1999 Balladeer Tales
- 1996 He's Alive, Collection Vol. I
- 1998 Beautiful To Me, Collection Vol. II
- 2004 The Package, Collection Vol. III
