= All I Can Do (Dolly Parton song) =

Single by Dolly Parton

from the album All I Can Do
- B-side: "The Fire That Keeps You Warm"
- Released: July 5, 1976
- Recorded: 1976
- Genre: Country
- Length: 2:25
- Label: RCA Victor
- Songwriter(s): Dolly Parton
- Producer(s): Dolly Parton

Dolly Parton singles chronology
"We Used To" (1975)	"All I Can Do" (1976)	"Hey, Lucky Lady" (1976)

"All I Can Do" is a song written and recorded by American country music artist Dolly Parton. It was released in July 1976 as the second single and title track from the album All I Can Do. At the country singles chart, the song topped in Canada, and reached number 3 in USA.

== Chart performance ==
Weekly

Chart (1976)	Peak position
U.S. Billboard Hot Country Singles	3
Canadian RPM Country Tracks	1

Year-End

Chart (1976)	Peak Position
US Hot Country Songs (Billboard)	36
