= All I Can Do (album) =

Studio album by Dolly Parton
- Released: August 16, 1976
- Recorded: December 9, 1974–February 19, 1976
- Studio: RCA Studio A (Nashville)
- Genre: Country
- Length: 27:51
- Label: RCA Victor
- Producers: Porter Wagoner; Dolly Parton

Dolly Parton chronology
Dolly (1975)	All I Can Do (1976)	New Harvest...First Gathering (1977)

Singles from All I Can Do
- 1. "Hey, Lucky Lady" Released: February 2, 1976; 2. "All I Can Do" Released: July 5, 1976; 3. "Shattered Image" Released: November 19, 1976

All I Can Do is the seventeenth solo studio album by American singer-songwriter Dolly Parton. It was released on August 16, 1976, by RCA Victor. The album was co-produced by Parton and Porter Wagoner and would be the last of Parton's solo albums to have any involvement from Wagoner. It was nominated for Best Country Vocal Performance, Female at the 19th Annual Grammy Awards. The album spawned three singles: "Hey, Lucky Lady", "All I Can Do", and "Shattered Image".

The album was reissued for the first time in March 2007. It was released on CD with Parton's 1977 album New Harvest...First Gathering and was also released as a digital download.

== Content ==
In addition to eight Parton compositions, the album includes two covers: Emmylou Harris' "Boulder to Birmingham" and Merle Haggard's "Life's Like Poetry". The album was released around the time Parton began appearing regularly in the tabloids, and "Shattered Image", which advised to "stay out of my closet if your own's full of trash," was said to be a reaction to that. "The Fire That Keeps You Warm" was previously recorded by Parton and Porter Wagoner on their 1974 album Porter 'n' Dolly.

Parton would re-record "Shattered Image" for her 2002 album Halos & Horns.

"Falling Out of Love with Me" was covered by country-rock band Pinmonkey in 2002 with Parton providing harmony vocals.

== Critical reception ==
Professional ratings
Review scores
Source	Rating
AllMusic	4/5 stars
Christgau's Record Guide	B+
The Encyclopedia of Popular Music	3/5 stars

In a review published in the August 28, 1976, issue, Billboard said, "Exceptional LP by the enigmatic lady who has reached the pinnacle of country music success and is now making her impact, deservingly, on the pop music market. Few artists write better songs than Parton, and no one can sing them better. A powerful performer, Parton provides an album for country and pop chart consideration. Her version of Emmylou Harris' "Boulder to Birmingham" is a striking, heartfelt song, sung without pretension and with a surplus of feeling. Effective blend of slow ballads and uptempo numbers, contains a pair of her hit singles and a couple more that should make good singles. Incisive liner notes by Don Cusic add depth to an already noteworthy LP."

Cashbox published a review in the August 28, 1976, issue that said, "Making a positive move into the progressive sound, Dolly makes her current single the theme of the total offering. Other self-penned selections are "The Fire That Keeps You Warm", "When the Sun Goes Down Tomorrow", "I'm a Drifter," "Falling Out of Love with Me", "Shattered Image", "Preacher Tom" and "Hey, Lucky Lady". Also included are "Life’s Like Poetry" (Merle Haggard) and "Boulder to Birmingham" (Emmylou Harris/Bill Danoff). A Dolly Parton/Porter Wagoner production."

== Commercial performance ==
The album debuted at number 32 on Billboard Hot Country Albums chart. It would eventually peaking at number three in its eleventh week and spent a total of 25 weeks on the chart.

The album's first single, "Hey Lucky Lady", was released in February 1976 and peaked at number 19 on the Billboard Hot Country Singles chart and number 11 in Canada on the RPM Top Country Singles chart.

"All I Can Do" was released as the second single in July 1976 and peaked at number three on the Billboard Hot Country Singles chart and number one in Canada on the RPM Top Country Singles chart.

The third single, "Shattered Image", was released in the UK in November 1976 and did not chart.

== Accolades ==
The album was nominated for Best Country Vocal Performance, Female at the 19th Annual Grammy Awards.

19th Annual Grammy Awards
Year	Work	Award	Result	Ref.
1977	All I Can Do	Best Country Vocal Performance, Female	Nominated	

== Track listing ==
All tracks are written by Dolly Parton, except where noted.

Side one
No.	Title	Recording date	Length
1.	"All I Can Do"	February 18, 1976	2:23
2.	"The Fire That Keeps You Warm"	February 19, 1976	2:49
3.	"When the Sun Goes Down Tomorrow"	unknown	2:05
4.	"I'm a Drifter"	February 17, 1976	2:53
5.	"Falling Out of Love with Me"	February 18, 1976	2:47

Side two
No.	Title	Writer(s)	Recording date	Length
1.	"Shattered Image"		February 17, 1976	2:23
2.	"Boulder to Birmingham"	Emmylou Harris; Bill Danoff	February 19, 1976	4:13
3.	"Preacher Tom"		February 17, 1976	3:40
4.	"Life's Like Poetry"	Merle Haggard	unknown	1:48
5.	"Hey, Lucky Lady"		December 9, 1974	2:20

== Personnel ==
Adapted from the album liner notes.

- Herb Burnette – art director
- Don Cusic – liner notes
- The Lea Jane Singers – vocal accompaniment
- Dolly Parton – vocals, producer, arrangements
- Tom Pick – recording engineer
- Hope Powell – photography
- Roy Shockley – second engineer
- Porter Wagoner – producer, arrangements

== Charts ==
Album

Chart (1976)	Peak position
US Hot Country LP's (Billboard)	3
US Cashbox Country Albums	4

Singles

Title	Year	Peak position	
Title	Year	US Country	CAN Country
"Hey, Lucky Lady"	1976	19	11
"All I Can Do"	1976	3	1
