= Pure & Simple (Dolly Parton album) =

Studio album by Dolly Parton
- Released: August 19, 2016
- Recorded: 2015–2016
- Genre: Country
- Length: 33:00
- Labels: Dolly Records; RCA Records
- Producer: Dolly Parton

Dolly Parton chronology
Just Between You and Me: The Complete Recordings, 1967–1976 (2014)	Pure & Simple (2016)	The Complete Trio Collection (2016)

Singles from Pure & Simple
- 1. "Pure and Simple" Released: July 8, 2016; 2. "Outside Your Door" Released: July 29, 2016; 3. "Head Over High Heels" Released: September 16, 2016

Pure & Simple is the forty-fifth solo studio album by American singer-songwriter Dolly Parton. It was released worldwide on August 19, 2016 by Dolly Records and RCA Records. "Pure & Simple" is Dolly Parton's seventh #1 country album. It is her first #1 country album in 25 years. It is also her last self written of original material in her career

== Background ==
The genesis for the project was a pair of intimate concerts Parton performed at Nashville's Ryman Auditorium in August 2015, featuring Parton and a quartet of backing players, entitled "Dolly Parton: Pure and Simple". The concerts were repeated the following weekend with four performances at Dollywood. The shows were well received and from that emerged the idea to produce a similarly-stripped down album and tour.

At a press conference held in Toronto, Canada on June 13, 2016 Parton covered a wide range of topics to promote the Canadian leg of her Pure & Simple Tour. Among the tidbits were that the album would be distributed worldwide by Sony Music for Dolly Records, its release date had been moved from August 26 to 19, that the title track would be a single and that "Outside Your Door" might be the second single. The album was ultimately distributed through RCA Nashville, effectively reuniting Parton (who had been with RCA from 1967 to 1986) with her longtime record label.

Four songs from the album have been previously recorded by Parton. "Tomorrow Is Forever" was originally recorded as a duet with Porter Wagoner for their 1970 album Porter Wayne and Dolly Rebecca. "Say Forever You'll Be Mine" was also originally recorded as a duet with Porter Wagoner for their 1975 album of the same name. "Can't Be That Wrong", with a few lyrical differences, was previously recorded as "God Won't Get You", and released on the soundtrack to Parton's 1984 film Rhinestone. The bonus track "Mama" was featured in Dollywood's My People production from 2013 to 2017.

== Release and promotion ==
The bonus track "Mama" was released as a free download for Mother's Day via Parton's official website on May 4.

On July 7, Parton revealed the album's artwork and track listing in an article by the Huffington Post. It was also announced that the album would be available for pre-order beginning July 8.

USA Today published an interview with Parton about the album on August 16, and it featured a first-listen to the album track "Can't Be That Wrong".

The album was released August 19 on CD and digital download. A variety of CD versions were released. The standard version featured the 10-track album. The deluxe version of the album sold at Walmart stores contained two bonus tracks and a bonus CD featuring ten of Parton's biggest hits. The European version of the album contained two bonus tracks and a bonus CD of Parton's 2014 Glastonbury set. A deluxe version of the album was released August 26 exclusively at Cracker Barrel. This version of the album comes with a 30-page booklet, two bonus tracks from Parton's Glastonbury set, a magnet, and a coupon booklet.

=== Tour ===
The Pure & Simple Tour was announced March 6, 2016 on Parton's official website. A press conference was held the following day providing additional details concerning the tour. The trek was Parton's biggest tour in 25 years. Parton played 64 dates across the United States and Canada, visiting the most requested markets missed on previous tours. Parton explained that a tour was not initially planned due to her busy schedule, but following two sold out performances at the Ryman Auditorium in August 2015, and four shows the following weekend at Dollywood, her interest in returning to the stage was sparked.

=== Singles ===
On July 6, Parton announced via Twitter that her new single, "Pure and Simple", would receive its radio debut on BBC Radio 2 during the Ken Bruce Show on July 7. Its lyric video was debuted on July 7 by the Huffington Post. The single was released to all digital music platforms on July 8.

The album's second single, "Outside Your Door", was released July 29, along with its lyric video.

On September 15, Cosmopolitan published an article announcing "Head Over High Heels" as the album's third single and premiered the lyric video.

=== Television appearances ===
To promote the album and tour, as well as Dollywood, Parton appeared on Hallmark Channel's Home & Family everyday during the week of May 30–June 3. Throughout the week Parton performed seven songs: three new songs off the album ("Pure and Simple", "Mama", and "Say Forever You'll Be Mine"), one song from the movie Dolly Parton's Coat of Many Colors ("Angel Hill" with Alyvia Alyn Lind), and three classics ("Coat of Many Colors", "Applejack" and "My Tennessee Mountain Home").

Parton appeared on The Tonight Show Starring Jimmy Fallon on August 23 to promote the album and performed the title track, "Pure and Simple". The following morning, to further promote the album, Parton made an appearance on Today where she performed "9 to 5", "Pure and Simple" and "Coat of Many Colors".

On October 3, Parton made appearances on The Talk where she gave an interview, and Jimmy Kimmel Live! where she was interviewed and performed "Outside Your Door".

== Critical reception ==
Professional ratings
Aggregate scores
Source	Rating
AnyDecentMusic?	5.9/10
Metacritic	67/100
Review scores
Source	Rating
Toronto Sun	2.5/5 stars
The Scotsman	2/5 stars
The Plain Dealer	C−
Newsday	B+
Now	3/5 stars
Entertainment Weekly	A−
The Irish Times	3/5 stars
The Guardian	3/5 stars
Metro Weekly	4/5 stars
Exclaim!	6/10

Pure & Simple received generally positive reviews from contemporary music critics. At Metacritic, they assign a rating out of 100 to selected independent reviews from mainstream critics, the album has an average score of 67, based on 11 reviews, which indicates "generally favorable reviews". Glenn Gamboa gave the album a B+ rating in his review for New York's Newsday, calling the album "a thick slice of down-home charm from the country legend." He also named "Head Over High Heels" and "Outside Your Door" standout tracks and praised the simple production of the album, "This isn't big-production Dolly. These are songs that focus on her vocals and her storytelling, sweet, kindhearted tales that seem to belong in a simpler time."

The Toronto Sun reviewed the album, giving it 2 1/2 out of 5 stars, saying, "While it might not be her glossiest offering, Pure & Simple is an average batch of romantic ballads and poppier ditties voiced in her breathy flutter. Nice and sweet – but no big deal." Writing for Exclaim!, Stuart Henderson gave the album a mixed review, calling it a "a middle shelf release in Parton's discography." The Scotsman gave it 2 stars, stating "This is Dolly in either sugary sweet or breathily sensitive mode, accompanied by the trill of mandolin, delicately picked guitar or graceful strings." The Arts Desk gave a positive review of the album, "As artistic passions go, Parton's is a straightforward one, but it's delivered with conviction and an enjoyable sense of melodrama," praising all tracks except "Mama", saying that it "is a gruesome syrup of 1950s gender stereotyping."

In a review for Entertainment Weekly Madison Vain gave the album an A− and said that "occasionally the album feels like it might be on the verge of wading too far into sappy Hallmark Card territory...but those moments are rare, and the album is saved by Parton's self-assured soprano, which has lost none of its girlish charm." Joe Breen of The Irish Times gave the album 3 out of 5 stars, saying that "there is entertainment aplenty, both lachrymose and lively, but the songs are mostly safe and predictable musings on enduring love."

Matt Williams of Toronto's Now gave the album 3 out of 5 stars in his review, calling the album a much needed "injection of sunshine" in the midst of all the "darkness and anxiety [that] permeate[s] our pop music landscape." Sean Maunder for Metro Weekly gave the album 4 stars and said that although it "may not rank among her most memorable work, ...it is quintessential Dolly, an album that reminds us why she has such staying power. In an increasingly uncertain world, it's comforting to know that Dolly Parton is a constant."

== Commercial performance ==
In the U.S., Pure & Simple debuted at No. 11 on the Billboard 200 with first-week sales of 20,200 copies. Pure & Simple was also Parton's best debut on Billboard's Top Country Albums chart, entering at No. 1, surpassing 2014's Blue Smoke, which debuted at No. 2. It was also Parton's first No. 1 album on the Top Country Albums chart since 1991's Eagle When She Flies 25 years prior. The album also debuted at No. 1 on Billboard's US Folk Albums chart. The album has sold 117,600 copies in the U.S. as of May 2017.

Pure & Simple debuted at No. 2 on the UK Albums chart and No. 1 on the UK Country Albums chart with sales of 17,000 copies. On the Australian Albums chart the album landed at No. 9. In Canada, the album debuted at No. 20, her highest charting studio album in the Canada SoundScan era. It surpassed the No. 31 peak of her last release, 2014's Blue Smoke. The album debuted at No. 33 on the Irish Albums chart. In New Zealand the album made its chart debut at No. 39. The lowest chart position came from Belgium, debuting at No. 133.

== Track listing ==
All tracks are written by Dolly Parton, except where noted.

Pure & Simple track listing
No.	Title	Length
1.	"Pure and Simple"	2:44
2.	"Say Forever You'll Be Mine"	2:49
3.	"Never Not Love You"	3:36
4.	"Kiss It (And Make It All Better)"	3:48
5.	"Can't Be That Wrong"	3:56
6.	"Outside Your Door"	3:03
7.	"Tomorrow Is Forever"	3:10
8.	"I'm Sixteen"	3:34
9.	"Head Over High Heels"	2:50
10.	"Forever Love"	3:30
Total length:		33:00

Walmart, international and UK edition bonus tracks
No.	Title	Length
11.	"Mama"	3:42
12.	"Lovin' You"	3:25
Total length:		40:07

Cracker Barrel edition
No.	Title	Length
11.	"Jolene" (Live from Glastonbury)	2:52
12.	"9 to 5" (Live from Glastonbury)	3:59
Total length:		39:51

Walmart and international edition bonus disc – The Hits
No.	Title	Writer(s)	Length
1.	"My Tennessee Mountain Home"		3:08
2.	"Coat of Many Colors"		3:05
3.	"How Great Thou Art"	Stuart K. Hine	3:34
4.	"Jolene"		2:42
5.	"Light of a Clear Blue Morning"		4:57
6.	"Here You Come Again"	Barry Mann; Cynthia Weil	2:57
7.	"Help!"	John Lennon; Paul McCartney	2:45
8.	"Islands in the Stream" (duet with Kenny Rogers)	Barry Gibb; Robin Gibb; Maurice Gibb	4:10
9.	"9 to 5"		2:47
10.	"I Will Always Love You"		2:54
Total length:			32:59

U.K. edition bonus disc – Live from Glastonbury
No.	Title	Writer(s)	Length
1.	"Fire Medley: Baby I'm Burning / Great Balls of Fire / This Girl Is on Fire"	Parton; Otis Blackwell; Jack Hammer; Alicia Keys; Salaam Remi; Jeff Bhaskar; Billy Squier	3:26
2.	"Why'd You Come in Here Lookin' Like That"	Bob Carlisle; Randy Thomas	3:29
3.	"Jolene"		3:41
4.	"Blue Smoke"		5:08
5.	"Coat of Many Colors"		4:27
6.	"Rocky Top"	Felice Bryant; Boudleaux Bryant	5:08
7.	"Mud Song"		2:54
8.	"Banks of the Ohio"	Traditional; additional lyrics by Parton	3:15
9.	"Here You Come Again"	Barry Mann; Cynthia Weil	2:53
10.	"Two Doors Down"		1:59
11.	"Islands in the Stream" (duet with Richard Dennison)	B. Gibb; R. Gibb; M. Gibb	3:49
12.	"9 to 5"		7:29
13.	"Lay Your Hands on Me" (duet with Richie Sambora)	Jon Bon Jovi; Richie Sambora	6:34
14.	"I Will Always Love You"		5:29
Total length:			59:41

== Personnel ==
Adapted from album liner notes.

- Monty Lane Allen – background vocals, duet vocals
- David Angell – violin
- David Davidson – Violin, String Arrangements
- Michael Davis – strings programming
- Richard Dennison – electric piano, background vocals, piano, duet vocals, synth
- Paul Franklin – steel guitar
- Kevin Grantt – upright bass
- Vicki Hampton – background vocals
- Tom Hoey – drums, percussion
- Paul Hollowell – piano, organ
- Anthony LaMarchina – cello
- Steve Mackey – electric bass
- Jimmy Mattingly – mandolin, fiddle
- Patrick Murphy – mixing engineer, tracking engineer
- Jennifer O'Brian – background vocals
- Dolly Parton – lead Vocals, harmony Vocals
- Jeff Pearles – background vocals
- Tom Rutledge – acoustic guitar, tracking engineer, banjo, electric guitar
- Bobby Shin – tracking engineer
- Nathan Smith – mixing engineer
- Steve Turner – drums
- Kent Wells – electric guitar
- Kristen Wilkinson – viola

== Charts ==
=== Weekly charts ===
Chart (2016)	Peak position
Australian Albums (ARIA)	9
Australian Country Albums (ARIA)	1
Belgian Albums (Ultratop Flanders)	132
Canadian Albums (Billboard)	20
German Albums (Offizielle Top 100)	79
Irish Albums (IRMA)	33
New Zealand Albums (RMNZ)	39
Scottish Albums (Official Charts)	2
Swiss Albums (Schweizer Hitparade)	25
UK Albums (Official Charts)	2
UK Country Albums (Official Charts)	1
US Billboard 200	11
US Top Country Albums (Billboard)	1
US Americana/Folk Albums (Billboard)	1

=== Year-end charts ===
Chart (2016)	Position
US Top Country Albums (Billboard)	32
US Folk Albums (Billboard)	11

== Release history ==
Country	Date	Format	Label	Edition(s)
Worldwide	August 19, 2016	CD, digital download	Dolly Records, RCA Nashville	Standard, Walmart, International, UK editions
United States	August 26, 2016	CD	Dolly Records, RCA Nashville	Cracker Barrel edition
