= 9 to 5 and Odd Jobs =

1980 studio album by Dolly Parton

Studio album by Dolly Parton
- Released: November 17, 1980
- Recorded: April–c. September 1980
- Studios: Sound Labs (Hollywood); Audio Media (Nashville, Tennessee); Western Recorders (Los Angeles)
- Genres: Country; pop
- Length: 35:34
- Label: RCA Victor
- Producers: Mike Post, Gregg Perry

Dolly Parton chronology
Porter & Dolly (1980)	9 to 5 and Odd Jobs (1980)	Heartbreak Express (1982)

Singles from 9 to 5 and Odd Jobs
- 1. "9 to 5" Released: November 3, 1980; 2. "But You Know I Love You" Released: March 16, 1981; 3. "The House of the Rising Sun" Released: August 3, 1981

9 to 5 and Odd Jobs is the 23rd studio album by American entertainer Dolly Parton. It was released on November 17, 1980, by RCA Records. A concept album about working, the album was centered on Parton's hit "9 to 5", which served as the theme song to the film of the same name (co-starring Parton, Jane Fonda and Lily Tomlin) and its soundtrack, and topped both the U.S. country and pop charts. The album's two additional singles—a cover of Mike Settle's "But You Know I Love You" and a reading of "The House of the Rising Sun" – provided further country hits, with "But You Know I Love You" also reaching No. 1.

The understated pop-country arrangement of most of the songs was seen as a welcome return to form for Parton by critics, after the overly polished pop sound of Parton's previous albums. In addition to five Parton compositions, the album contained a number of folk and country classics, including work by Woody Guthrie, Mel Tillis and Merle Travis. The Parton-penned "Poor Folks Town" was originally recorded as a duet with Porter Wagoner on the 1972 album Together Always.

The album was produced by Mike Post (with the exception of "9 to 5", which was produced by Parton's bandleader Gregg Perry).

A 1983 reissue on cassette omitted the tracks "Detroit City" and "Dark as a Dungeon", and moved the song "Sing for the Common Man" to the end of Side 2. However, a 2009 reissue of the album included all ten of the album's original tracks, as well as a remixed version of "9 to 5", and a previously unreleased cover of Sly & the Family Stone's 1969 hit "Everyday People" as bonus cuts.

The album stayed at No. 1 on the Billboard Top Country Albums chart for 10 consecutive weeks and ended up being certified Gold by the Recording Industry Association of America.

== Critical reception ==
Professional ratings
Review scores
Source	Rating
AllMusic	4.5/5 stars
Robert Christgau	B+
The Encyclopedia of Popular Music	3/5 stars
The Rolling Stone Album Guide	3.5/5 stars

AllMusic retrospectively rated 9 to 5 and Odd Jobs four-and-a-half out of five stars. William Ruhlmann, who reviewed the album, stated that due to RCA's practice of "shoving poorly organized products onto the market, most of Parton's albums are hard to recommend", but that "[the songs are] enough to put it a notch above most of Parton's RCA catalog." Critic Robert Christgau rated the album a B+ and wrote, "How you respond to this quasi-concept album about (of all things) work [...] depends on your tolerance for fame-game schlock".

== Track listing ==
No.	Title	Writer(s)	Length
1.	"9 to 5"	Dolly Parton	2:45
2.	"Hush-a-bye Hard Times"	Parton	3:48
3.	"The House of the Rising Sun"	Traditional; arranged by Dolly Parton and Mike Post	4:02
4.	"Deportee (Plane Wreck at Los Gatos)"	Woody Guthrie, Martin Hoffman	4:41
5.	"Sing for the Common Man"	Frieda Parton, Mark Andersen	3:47
6.	"Working Girl"	Parton	3:17
7.	"Detroit City"	Danny Dill, Mel Tillis	3:35
8.	"But You Know I Love You"	Mike Settle	3:17
9.	"Dark as a Dungeon"	Merle Travis	3:25
10.	"Poor Folks' Town"	Parton	2:57
Total length:			35:34

2009 CD bonus tracks
No.	Title	Writer(s)	Length
11.	"Everyday People" (previously unreleased)	Sylvester Stewart	2:25
12.	"9 to 5" (Love to Infinity Radio Mix 2008)		3:30
13.	"9 to 5" (Karaoke Mix 2009. Previously unreleased)		2:45
Total length:			44:14

== Personnel ==
- Dolly Parton – vocals/nails
- Reggie Young – guitar
- Jeff Baxter, Marty Walsh – guitar (1)
- Larry Carlton – guitar (3, 6)
- Leland Sklar – bass guitar
- Abraham Laboriel – bass guitar (1)
- Joe McGuffee – steel guitar
- John Goux – slide guitar (3)
- Sonny Osborne – banjo
- Ron Oates – keyboards
- Ian Underwood – synthesizer
- Gregg Perry – organ (10)
- Larry Knechtel – piano (1)
- Eddie Bayers – drums
- Rick Shlosser – drums (1)
- Lenny Castro – percussion (1)
- Tom Saviano – saxophone (1)
- Kim Hutchcroft – baritone saxophone (1)
- Jerry Hey – trumpet (1)
- Bill Reichenbach – trombone (1)
- Mike Post – synthesized flute (8)
- Anita Ball, Joey Scarbury, Richard Dennison – backing vocals
- Anita Ball, Denise Maynelli, Stephanie Spruill – backing vocals (1)
- Bobby Osborne, Sonny Osborne – backing vocals (2)
- Sid Sharp – concertmaster

Technical

Recorded at Audio Media, Nashville, Tennessee. Mixed at Smoke Tree Ranch, Chatsworth, California.

- Chuck Britz, Doug Parry, Larry Carlton, Marshall Morgan, Paul Dobbe – engineer
- George Corsillo – art direction, design
- Tom Bryant – art direction
- Ron Slenzak – photography

== Charts ==
Album

Chart (1980)	Peak position
Australia (Kent Music Report)	33
Canadian RPM Country Albums	3
Canadian RPM Top Albums	15
U.S. Billboard Top Country Albums	1
U.S. Billboard 200	11
Swedish Albums (Sverigetopplistan)	15
Dutch Albums (Album Top 100)	31
US Cashbox Country Albums	1
US Cash Box Top Albums	15

Album (Year-End)

Chart (1981)	Peak Position
US Top Country LPs (Billboard)	1
US Billboard 200	40

== Certifications ==
Certifications for "9 to 5 and Odd Jobs"
Region	Certification	Certified units/sales
Canada (Music Canada)	Gold	50,000^{^}
New Zealand (RMNZ)	Gold	7,500^{‡}
United States (RIAA)	Gold	500,000^{^}
^{^} Shipments figures based on certification alone.^{‡} Sales+streaming figures based on certification alone.
