= 9 to 5 (musical) =

2008 musical by Dolly Parton

9 to 5: The Musical
- Music: Dolly Parton
- Lyrics: Dolly Parton
- Book: Patricia Resnick
- Basis: 9 to 5 by Colin Higgins; Patricia Resnick
- Productions: 2008 Los Angeles (try-out); 2009 Broadway; 2010 US tour 2012 UK tour 2019 West End; 2019 UK tour 2020/2022 Australian tour 2021/2022 UK tour 2022/2023 UK Tour TBC

9 to 5: The Musical is a musical based on the 1980 film of the same name, with music and lyrics by Dolly Parton. It features a book by Patricia Resnick, based on the screenplay by Resnick and Colin Higgins. The musical premiered in Los Angeles in September 2008, and opened on Broadway in April 2009. It received 15 Drama Desk Award nominations, the most received by a production in a single year, as well as four Tony Awards nominations. The Broadway production however was short-lived, closing in September 2009. A national tour of the US was launched in 2010, followed by a UK premiere in 2012. It opened in the West End in February 2019 and then launched a UK Tour in 2021. In its 2026/27 season, Encore! Musicals Berlin e.V. will performe the show in Berlin.

== Production history ==
=== Development ===
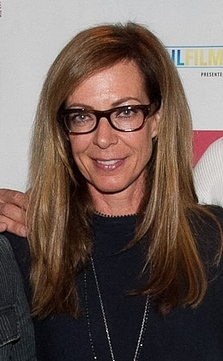
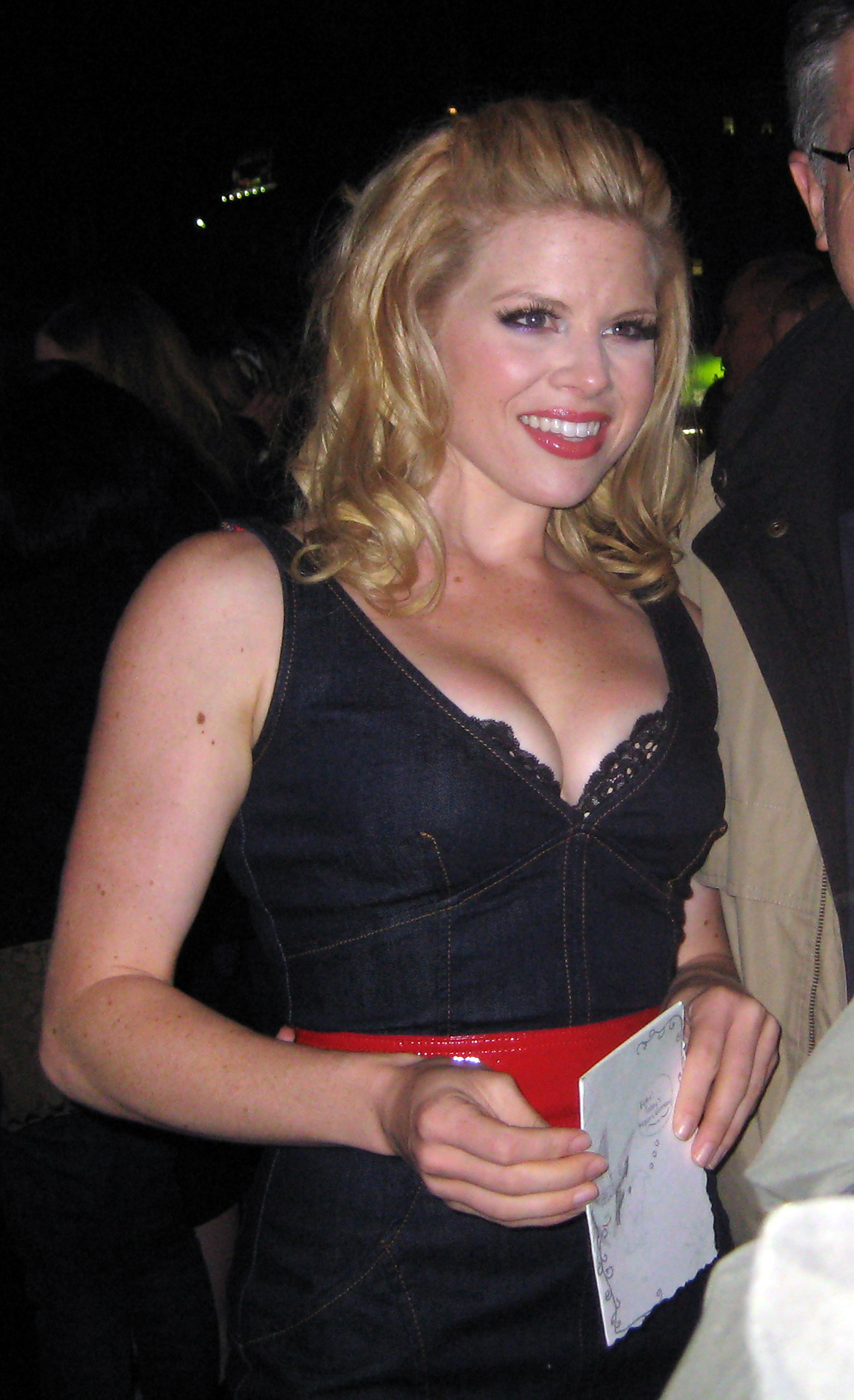
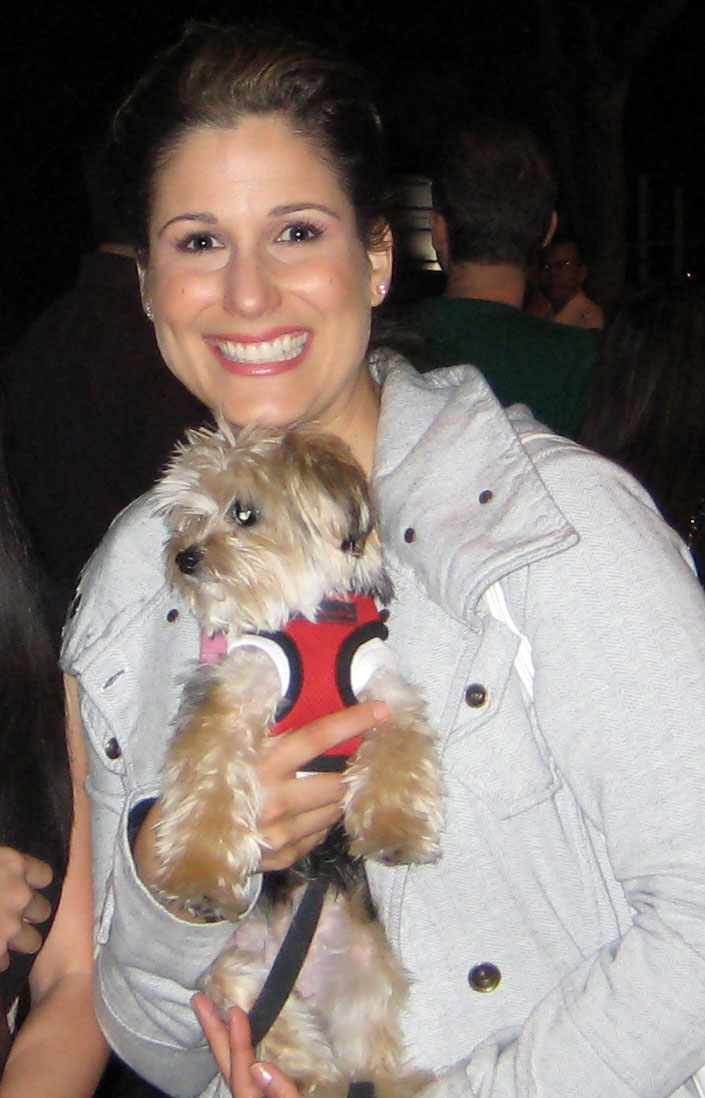
Allison Janney, Megan Hilty, and Stephanie J. Block portrayed Violet Newstead, Doralee Rhodes, and Judy Bernly respectively.

A reading of the musical was held on January 19, 2007, with a cast including Tracey Ullman, Allison Janney, Megan Hilty, Stephanie J. Block, Norm Lewis, and Marc Kudisch. A revised draft was tested in a week-long workshop beginning on June 20, 2007, with an industry presentation in New York on June 28, 2007. Additional performers included Bebe Neuwirth and Andy Karl.

=== Los Angeles tryout (2008) ===
The musical had a world premiere out-of-town engagement at the Center Theatre Group's Ahmanson Theatre in Los Angeles beginning previews September 9, 2008. The official opening night took place on September 20, on a run through October 19. It won two Los Angeles Drama Critics Circle Awards, for Musical Score (Parton) and for Choreography (Andy Blankenbuehler).

Following the Los Angeles run, a lawsuit was filed by the estate of Colin Higgins, the film's co-screenwriter and director, against Higgins' former attorney, now representing Resnick, for the musical's failure "to secure Mr. Higgins's stage rights for the musical project," among other issues.

=== Broadway (2009) ===
Previews began on Broadway at the Marquis Theatre on April 7, 2009, with an official opening on April 30. Joe Mantello directed, with a cast that featured Allison Janney, Stephanie J. Block, Megan Hilty, Andy Karl, and Marc Kudisch. A pro-shot was recorded on April 11, 2009. The production closed on September 6, 2009, after 24 previews and 148 regular performances.

=== US tour (2010–11) ===
The first national tour of the United States began at the Tennessee Performing Arts Center in Nashville on September 21, 2010. Jeff Calhoun took over as director and choreographer, in the production that featured Dee Hoty, Mamie Parris, Diana DeGarmo and Joseph Mahowald in the lead roles. In preparing the musical for the tour, Calhoun stated that in "believing that a short show is a happy show, we [have] jettisoned a second act song for the character of Mr. Hart, repositioned Roz's song in Act One and tried to make invisible cuts to the book."

The 10-month tour concluded on July 31, 2011, at the Bass Performance Hall in Fort Worth, Texas.

=== UK tour (2012–2013) ===
The revised 9 to 5 began its first national tour of the United Kingdom at the Manchester Opera House from October 12, 2012. Headlining the cast were Jackie Clune, Natalie Casey, Amy Lennox, Ben Richards and Bonnie Langford, who was succeeded in the role of Roz by Anita Louise Combe in 2013. Jeff Calhoun returned as director. The tour finished on August 24, 2013, at another run at the Manchester Opera House.

=== West End (2019–2020) ===
9 to 5 began previews at the Savoy Theatre in the West End on 29 January 2019, with an official opening night on 17 February. The original announced cast included Amber Davies as Judy Bernly, Louise Redknapp as Violet Newstead, Natalie McQueen as Doralee Rhodes, Brian Conley as Franklin Hart Jr. and Bonnie Langford as Roz Keith.

Shortly before previews began, Redknapp sustained a wrist injury and subsequently was delayed in joining the production. Caroline Sheen instead played Violet during Redknapp's recovery. Redknapp joined the production as Violet on 25 March 2019.

In May 2019, it was announced that the production's limited engagement would become an open-ended run, initially extending bookings until April 2020. McQueen continued as Doralee, while Chelsea Halfpenny succeeded Davies as Judy.

Sheen returned to the production as Violet on 4 July 2019, following Redknapp's departure from the company.

In October 2019, the production was extended again, with performances scheduled to continue until May 2020. On 28 October 2019, Dolly Parton announced that David Hasselhoff would succeed Conley as Franklin Hart Jr., appearing from 2 December 2019 until 8 February 2020.

The production played its final performance on 14 March 2020, closing earlier than scheduled as a result of the shutdown of West End theatres during the COVID-19 pandemic in the United Kingdom.

=== Australia (2022) ===
9 to 5 was announced to have its Australian premier at the Lyric Theatre in Sydney with previews beginning 19 April 2020. However, due to the global coronavirus pandemic, the production was postponed. The Australian premiere was on 24 February 2022 at the Capitol Theatre in Sydney. The production is directed by Jeff Calhoun who also directed and co-choreographed the 2010 re-imagination of the show as well as the 2019 West End production. The cast was originally announced to be Marina Prior as Violet, Caroline O'Connor as Roz, Erin Clare as Doralee, Samantha Dodemaide as Judy, and Eddie Perfect as Franklin Casey Donovan joined as Judy when the show was relaunched in 2021. Following the Sydney season, the show is expected to travel to Brisbane (at the Lyric Theatre, QPAC), Melbourne (at the State Theatre, Arts Centre Melbourne), and Adelaide (at the Festival Theatre).

=== UK Tour (2021/2022) ===
After the lifting of restrictions due to the COVID-19 pandemic, 9 to 5 began the second national tour of the United Kingdom from the Mayflower Theatre Southampton on August 31, 2021. Louise Redknapp reprised her role as Violet for the 2021 leg of the tour, with Claire Sweeney set to take over the role in the 2022 leg. The tour concluded at the Palace Theatre Manchester on March 5, 2022.

=== US Tour (2022) ===
In March 2022, it was announced that a new US tour, based on the West End and Australian productions, would launch in the fall of that year. Jeff Calhoun would serve as director of the production, with choreography by Lisa Stevens, design by Tom Rogers, lighting design by Howard Hudson, video design by Nina Dunn, and musical supervision, arrangements, and orchestrations by Mark Crossland.

=== UK Tour (2026) ===
Landmark Theatres revived the show for a fourth UK tour in 2026, opening at the producer's venue in Peterborough on a 10 venue tour of the UK.

=== Regional productions ===
The regional theatre premiere was held at the Barter Theatre in Abingdon, Virginia from February 23 to May 12, 2012. Subsequent regional productions took place at the Dutch Apple Dinner Theatre (March 15-April 28, 2012), Pointe Performing Arts Center in Orlando, Florida (March 30-April 15, 2012), The Music Theatre in Wichita, Kansas (June 22-July 1, 2012), Auburn, New York's Merry-Go-Round Playhouse (June 27-July 18, 2012), The Patchogue Theatre for the Performing Arts in Patchogue, NY (July 18-August 4, 2012), Rhode Island's Theatre By The Sea (July 18-August 11, 2012), the Ogunquit Playhouse (September), and Albuquerque's Little Theatre (October 19-November 11, 2012). 3-D Theatricals in Southern California will open a production on February 8, 2013, at Louis E. Plummer Auditorium in Fullerton and March 1, 2013, at the Redondo Beach Performing Arts Center. From June 21–30, 2013, The Wagon Wheel Theatre from June 19–29 wagonwheeltheatre.org, The Grand Opera House in Dubuque will host a production. From July 19 - August 3, 2013, it was presented by Minnetonka Theatre, Minnetonka, MN. On September 2, 2014, 9 to 5 opened at the Walnut Street Theater in Philadelphia. The show closed on October 19, 2014, and featured Dee Hoty as Violet.

=== Broadway Junior adaptation ===
On October 15, 2025, licensing company Music Theatre International released rights for 9 to 5 JR., a 60-minute adaptation of the musical constructed for younger performers. The show was abridged under the supervision of Timothy Allen McDonald.

== Plot ==
=== Act I ===
As the clocks ring and the workers wake up, Violet, Doralee, and Judy prepare for work ("9 to 5"). The workers begin another mundane and hellish day at work under Franklin Hart, Jr., President of Consolidated Industries. Judy and Violet meet for the first time and Judy reveals she does not have any work experience, but Violet states she will be proud to train her and gives her a few tips and pointers for surviving office life ("Around Here"). Franklin Hart, Jr., is a domineering and equally lecherous man, who lusts after his secretary, Doralee, and has no shame in making those feelings known, which discomfits Doralee ("Here for You"). Judy is having major issues on her first day (such as being unable to work a Xerox machine) and feels there is something more inhibiting her. All three women, in separate settings, share mutual feelings, but all feel they can overcome it and make it all work out in the end ("I Just Might"). A new day rises upon the begrudged workers of Consolidated and life resumes as normal. Around the lunch hour, Doralee and Judy speak for the first time as Doralee asks Judy to go to lunch with her, but Judy subtly refuses and Doralee doesn't know why. She then reflects on her whole life, about just being a pretty face and nothing much more ("Backwoods Barbie"). Violet is passed over for yet another promotion, which angers her since it is somebody that she personally trained. After a heated confrontation in Hart's office, Doralee finds out about Hart's rumor about their supposed 'affair', which infuriates her to the point of threatening him. All three of the women, who are now seemingly united in their contempt for Hart, go back to Violet's house and light up a joint. Suddenly, each woman lapses into a murderous fantasy involving Mr. Hart; Judy as an unforgiving femme fatale ("The Dance O' Death"), Doralee as a crack rodeo star ("Cowgirl's Revenge"), and Violet as a deranged Snow White ("Potion Notion"). All of these sadistic fantasies soon culminate into a celebration of Hart's death, which is quickly nixed after Hart is discovered alive ("Joy to the Girls").

The next day at the office, Violet unwittingly acts out her fantasy and believes she put rat poison into Hart's coffee. They all go to the hospital in a panic but learn he was never there. Roz overheard the ladies in the bathroom and tells Hart, who concocts a plan to scare them by pretending he was actually poisoned and to threaten them with the police. After Hart leaves, Roz sings a song confessing her obsessive love and fantasies for him ("Heart to Hart"). Hart confronts Doralee with the information and Doralee, acting on a fight or flight instinct, rips the phones out and ties up Hart with the wires, which he seems to get a quasi-sexual pleasure from. The women are seemingly puzzled as to what to do with Hart, but Judy and Violet create a plan in which they will imprison Hart in his own house. As they are carrying out their plan, they sing to Hart their issues with him and the problems in their own lives but will begin to make the changes in their lives and have the confidence to succeed ("Shine Like the Sun"). The women, empowered, have restrained Hart to a mechanical harness above his bed.

=== Act II ===
After the Entr'acte, in Hart's office, the three women are pondering on how they can keep the office in the dark about Hart's disappearance when Doralee's skill at forging Hart's signature comes into play. Judy and Doralee both point out to Violet that she is, in a sense, the new Operating Officer of the company. Violet then lapses into a power fantasy and sings about her new hard-hitting role, like the rest of the male employees (who seem to rank above the women) ("One of the Boys"). Roz begins to get nosy and wonders where Hart actually is, which creates a new obstacle for the ladies to be rid of. Judy formulates the idea to send Roz to a one-month language seminar to learn French, which isn't necessary and is only a way to get rid of her. Roz receives the memo from Violet and is heartbroken because she believes that Hart doesn't like her and that the time she isn't at work is lonely and boring ("5 to 9"). As Hart is still strung up in his bedroom, he passes time by watching countless hours of soap operas. Doralee enters to give him a meal and Hart lashes out at her saying that he still has the control and will use it when he is free. Doralee brushes him off and leaves the room. Hart begins to recount how most of the men in history had "downfalls" by women and that he is no different, which angers him ("Always a Woman").

Back at the office, the new changes the women have made under Hart's name have seemed to ease the workers' lives and changed their outlook on work ("Change It"). Joe, who has shown admiration toward Violet through the show, asking her out many times, confronts her and asks why she rebuffs him. She claims she was a "one-man woman" and that her husband's death three years before has prevented her from dating again. Joe tells her that it is time to move on and possibly give someone new a chance ("Let Love Grow"). Violet accepts as they walk out of the scene holding hands. Later on that evening, Judy's ex-husband, Dick, shows up at Hart's house and asks her to take him back (since his secretary girlfriend dumped him). She rebuffs him and states she is a changed woman who will not crawl back to someone who broke her heart, showing strength as she orders him to leave ("Get Out and Stay Out").

The next day, Hart storms into the office with Judy hostage, which shocks the women, who have collected evidence about Hart's "creative accounting" and embezzling practices to use against him. The women, seemingly defeated, prepare to submit to Hart's wishes when they learn that the CEO of Consolidated, Mr. Tinsworthy, is paying a visit. The women and Hart meet Tinsworthy, who, after noting the changes in office life, gives the credit to Hart. Violet and the others step up and say they made the changes, but are shot down. However, in a comedic twist, Tinsworthy sends Hart to manage the South American branch in Bolivia. Violet is then promoted to Hart's position as President of the company and a celebration ensues, while Roz is devastated over the loss of her obsession.

The characters deliver epilogues about what happened to everybody after the events of the story (Finale: "9 to 5" Reprise):

- Roz kept on working through the 90s. While she was unable to get through the departure of Hart, things changed when she met an old acquaintance on a social networking site and realized that she had found her soulmate. That turned out to be Hart's wife.
- Judy lived her life as a strong independent single woman and became a regular guest on The View after writing a bestselling memoir Life Without Dick.
- Doralee left Consolidated, went to Nashville, and became a successful country singer. Dwayne almost talked her into running for President of the United States, but bigger boobs have already been in the White House.
- Violet and Joe have been together for the past 30 years and are very happy together. She successfully ran Consolidated making it part of the top businesses in the country for employee satisfaction.
- Hart was abducted by a tribe of Amazons in the jungles of Bolivia and was never heard from again (in some versions, the tribe of Amazons are replaced with a tribe of angry warriors).

== Musical numbers ==
Act I

- "9 to 5" – Violet, Doralee, Dwayne, Judy and Ensemble
- "Around Here" – Violet and Ensemble
- "Here for You" – Franklin
- "I Just Might"* – Judy, Doralee and Violet
- "Backwoods Barbie" – Doralee
- "The Dance of Death" †† – Judy, Franklin and Ensemble
- "Cowgirl's Revenge" †† – Doralee, Franklin and Ensemble
- "Potion Notion" – †† Violet, Franklin and Ensemble
- "Joy to the Girls" †† – Judy, Doralee, Violet, Franklin and Ensemble
- "Heart to Hart" – Roz and Ensemble
- "Shine Like the Sun" – Doralee, Judy and Violet

Act II

- Entr'acte – Orchestra
- "One of the Boys" – Violet and Boys
- "5 to 9" – Roz
- "Always a Woman" *† – Franklin and Men's Ensemble
- "Change It" * – Doralee, Violet, Judy and Ensemble
- "Let Love Grow" – Joe and Violet
- "Get Out and Stay Out" – Judy
- "Finale: 9 to 5" – Company

Notes

† Removed for the US National Tour

†† Removed from the West End production and UK Tour and replaced with "Hey Boss" for Violet, Doralee and Judy

* Added to production after Los Angeles pre-Broadway run

=== Other songs ===
The following songs were in the Los Angeles pre-Broadway run and have since been cut from the final version of the Broadway production.

- "Out of Control": This song took place during the scene where Judy is using the Xerox machine. The song begins after Violet leaves Judy alone with the copy machine, having instructed her on how to use it. As the song progresses, Judy begins to feel confident that she is finally doing something right. Then suddenly the machine begins to go crazy; papers flying all over the place, etc. The aforementioned is what is currently present in the musical.
- "Tattletales": A song performed in the office cafeteria when Judy is eating lunch with Violet and the girls. They ask Judy to "spill her story" and she refuses. Kathy (Ann Harada's originated role) urges her to tell them and the cafeteria patrons all begin to explain how they "learned to gossip". Doralee enters in the middle of the song, wearing Judy's scarf, and the girls continue to spread rumors.
- "9 to 5" (Reprise) / "The One I Love": In the current and final version of the show a song called "I Just Might" takes place over these two songs. "9 to 5" (Reprise) was a small song that takes place as the Consolidated employees head home at 5PM after a long day of work. "The One I Love" comes shortly afterward and involves each of the three women at home either chatting with their husbands or with their children. Judy explicates that she may still love and have feelings for her ex-husband Dick, Violet with her son, and Doralee with her husband.
- "I Killed the Boss!": As Judy, Violet, and Doralee are at the hospital, they hear a doctor explaining to someone that "he is dead". Violet, believing that the doctor was speaking of Franklin, has become overly dramatic and thinks that she has killed Franklin by putting the rat poison in his coffee.
- "Mundania" / "Mundania" (Reprise): The song basically has the same message as "Always a Woman" which replaced these songs. Franklin is "hanging around" bored doing nothing and is finally sick and tired of the trio of girls and attempts to escape. He finally escapes during the reprise.
- "Willin'" / "Well-Oiled Machine": Was replaced by "Change It" and has the same meaning. The Consolidated employees are puzzled and concerned by all of Mr. Hart's changes and the girls urge them to continue working as a team.

9 to 5 uses a rock combo including keyboards, guitars, bass, drums, percussion, two woodwind players, two trumpets, and a trombone.

== Casts ==
Below is the principal casting of all major productions of the musical.

Characters	Broadway	US National Tour	First UK Tour	West End	Second UK Tour	Third UK Tour	Australia	Japan	Fourth UK Tour
Characters	2009	2010	2012	2019		2021	2022	2024	2026
Violet Newstead	Allison Janney	Dee Hoty	Jackie Clune	Caroline Sheen	Louise Redknapp	Louise Redknapp Claire Sweeney	Marina Prior	Rio Asumi	Jade Marvin
Judy Bernly	Stephanie J. Block	Mamie Parris	Natalie Casey	Amber Davies	Amber Davies	Vivian Panka	Casey Donovan	Sora Kazuki	Kayla Carter
Doralee Rhodes	Megan Hilty	Diana DeGarmo	Amy Lennox	Natalie McQueen	Georgina Castle	Stephanie Chandos	Erin Clare	Aya Hirano	Karla Tracey
Franklin Hart, Jr.	Marc Kudisch	Joseph Mahowald	Ben Richards	Brian Conley	Sean Needham	Sean Needham	Eddie Perfect	Tetsuya Bessho	Tim Rogers
Roz Keith	Kathy Fitzgerald	Kristine Zbornik	Bonnie Langford	Bonnie Langford	Lucinda Lawrence	Julia J Nagle	Caroline O'Connor	Megumi Iino	Jessica Martin
Joe	Andy Karl	Gregg Goodbrod	Mark Willshire	Christopher Jordan Marshall	Christopher Jordan Marshall	Russell Dickson	Ethan Jones	Akiyoshi Utsumi	Benjamin Karran

== Recordings ==
An original Broadway cast recording was recorded on May 3, and May 4, 2009, at Legacy Recording Studios in New York. The cast recording of the show was available on July 14, 2009, through all digital formats (including iTunes), and through Parton's official website. The hard-copy CD was available on July 28, 2009. It was released ahead of schedule at the Marquis Theatre (July 2, 2009). The cast recording has 18 tracks and features the entire original score minus the Act II entr'acte. On December 4, 2009, when the Grammy Award nominees were announced, the cast recording was nominated for Best Musical Show Album.

A West End Cast Recording was released on February 7, 2020. It features the entire West End version of the score as recorded by the Original West End cast. It was recorded live at the Savoy Theatre during the show's run there.

== Critical response ==
=== Los Angeles ===
The Los Angeles try-outs received mixed reviews from critics. Variety praised the three female leads but suggested cutting act one: "Giant production numbers lose sight of character and quickly wear out their welcome." Further, the review praised the choreography, design, and Parton's music, saying that the "score mostly achieves its intended goals of variety, build and likability, at its best nailing character with images as resonant as the title tune's 'Pour myself a cup of ambition.'" The review noted: "Joe Mantello consistently indulges business in dubious taste." The Theatremania.com review, while praising the choreography, costumes, set and performances of the female leads, concluded that "ultimately, the whole enterprise lacks the freshness it needs to make it a truly first-rate musical". The Ventura County Star praised the director and choreographer, "along with music director Stephen Oremus, whose arrangements add to the texture of the show... the classy Allison Janney and two actor-songbirds, Megan Hilty and Stephanie J. Block, who carry the delightful burden of keeping the faith with much more of Parton's energizing, warmhearted way with words and music". The Orange County Register praised the three female leads but wrote that "this production is more tricked out than it needs to be. Director Joe Mantello and his creative team have spent a great deal of time and energy turning a modest story about office politics into a bells-and-whistles Broadway show".

=== Broadway ===
Following the Broadway opening, Ben Brantley of The New York Times described the show as an "overinflated whoopee cushion" and a "gaudy, empty musical" that "piles on the flashy accessories like a prerecession hedge funder run amok at Barney's." He thought the stage adaptation turns its "feminist revenge story into an occasion for lewd slapstick (which feels about as up-to-date as the 1940s burlesque revue Hellzapoppin) and a mail-order catalog of big production numbers, filtered through that joyless aesthetic that pervaded the 1970s." He added, "The comic sensibility certainly feels vintage, rather in the smirky mode of sitcoms like Three's Company. The governing philosophy seems to be that it's O.K. to leer if you wink at your own prurience... That's true of much of the show. Its broad flirtation with tastelessness reminds you of how stylishly Mel Brooks played with brazen vulgarity in The Producers."

In the New York Daily News, Joe Dziemianowicz rated the production three out of five stars. He thought the "bouncy, big-hearted songs" were "fresh and original", although "Not every tune is a home run, and some lyrics are too plain-spoken. But enough of them stand out." He thought the creative team "has struggled to open the show up for the stage". In conclusion he said, "Is 9 to 5 as hip as TV's The Office or as joyously hit-filled as How to Succeed in Business Without Really Trying? No, but if you're looking for a little diversion, it will do the trick from 8 to 10:15."

Linda Winer of Newsday called it "lavish and harmless entertainment... with a shiny-colored and efficient score" and said "the squarely old-fashioned show fills a tourist-ready Hollywood slot left vacant by Legally Blonde and Hairspray. The thing feels less created than assembled from recycled musical-comedy components, but Broadway doesn't have one of these right now, and summer approaches."

Writing for the New York Post, Elizabeth Vincentelli rated the show three out of four stars and called it "goofily entertaining". About Dolly Parton she said, "It shouldn't surprise anybody she's taken so well to the stage: She's always been a storyteller first and foremost. Her countrified pop, enhanced by fiddle and pedal-steel guitar, fits perfectly on Broadway. Of all the mainstream artists who've tried their hand at show music in the past few years, she may be the most convincing."

Variety critic David Rooney thought that, although the material showcasing the female leads "is an uneven cut-and-paste job that struggles to recapture the movie's giddy estrogen rush, plenty of folks will nonetheless find this a nostalgic crowd-pleaser." He continued, "As composer-lyricist of the country-flavored pop score, Parton is a significant presence... not just in the evergreen title tune but particularly in a handful of new songs... [that] reveal the songwriter's authentic personality," and concluded, "The pleasures of 9 to 5 are less guilty, but they're also less satisfying than they should be. The promising material and terrific performers are too often sold short by clumsy story-building, overwhelming sets and unfocused direction."

Ed Pilkington of The Guardian called the stage adaptation "a triumph" and praised Parton, describing her as "the real star of the show" and adding, "She is not on stage, but her presence fills it. She has composed a set of songs, accompanied with her own lyrics, that complement the original song. The greatest triumph of the night was that the film has been reinvented as a musical so successfully. It seemed improbable, given the cult status of the movie, but the stage show has met it and raised it, rather than being its pale imitation."

== Awards and nominations ==
=== Los Angeles try-out ===
Year	Award Ceremony	Category	Nominee	Result
2008	LA Ovation Award	Best Book/Lyrics/Music for an Original Musical	Dolly Parton and Patricia Resnick	Nominated
2008	LA Ovation Award	Lead Actress in a Musical	Megan Hilty	Nominated
2008	LA Ovation Award	Lead Actress in a Musical	Allison Janney	Nominated
2008	LA Ovation Award	Best Scenic Design - Large Theatre	Scott Pask	Nominated
2008	LA Ovation Award	Best Costume Design - Large Theatre	William Ivey Long	Nominated
2008	LA Ovation Award	Best Lighting Design - Large Theatre	Jules Fisher and Peggy Eisenhauer	Nominated
2008	LA Ovation Award	Best Sound Design - Large Theatre	John H. Shivers	Nominated
2008	Los Angeles Drama Critics Circle Award	Best Musical Score	Dolly Parton	Won
2008	Los Angeles Drama Critics Circle Award	Best Choreography	Andy Blankenbuehler	Won

=== Original Broadway production ===
Year	Award Ceremony	Category	Nominee	Result
2009	Drama Desk Award	Outstanding Musical		Nominated
2009	Drama Desk Award	Outstanding Book of a Musical	Patricia Resnick	Nominated
2009	Drama Desk Award	Outstanding Actress in a Musical	Allison Janney	Won
2009	Drama Desk Award	Outstanding Actress in a Musical	Stephanie J. Block	Nominated
2009	Drama Desk Award	Outstanding Actress in a Musical	Megan Hilty	Nominated
2009	Drama Desk Award	Outstanding Featured Actor in a Musical	Marc Kudisch	Nominated
2009	Drama Desk Award	Outstanding Director of a Musical	Joe Mantello	Nominated
2009	Drama Desk Award	Outstanding Choreography	Andy Blankenbuehler	Nominated
2009	Drama Desk Award	Outstanding Music	Dolly Parton	Nominated
2009	Drama Desk Award	Outstanding Lyrics	Dolly Parton	Nominated
2009	Drama Desk Award	Outstanding Orchestrations	Bruce Coughlin	Nominated
2009	Drama Desk Award	Outstanding Set Design	Scott Pask	Nominated
2009	Drama Desk Award	Outstanding Costume Design	William Ivey Long	Nominated
2009	Drama Desk Award	Outstanding Lighting Design	Jules Fisher and Kenneth Posner	Nominated
2009	Drama Desk Award	Outstanding Sound Design	John H. Shivers	Nominated
2009	Drama League Award	Distinguished Production of a Musical		Nominated
2009	Drama League Award	Distinguished Performance	Megan Hilty	Nominated
2009	Drama League Award	Distinguished Performance	Allison Janney	Nominated
2009	Grammy Award	Best Musical Show Album		Nominated
2009	Outer Critics Circle Award	Outstanding Actress in a Musical	Megan Hilty	Nominated
2009	Outer Critics Circle Award	Outstanding Featured Actress in a Musical	Kathy Fitzgerald	Nominated
2009	Outer Critics Circle Award	Outstanding Choreographer	Andy Blankenbuehler	Nominated
2009	Tony Award	Best Original Score	Dolly Parton	Nominated
2009	Tony Award	Best Actress in a Musical	Allison Janney	Nominated
2009	Tony Award	Best Featured Actor in a Musical	Marc Kudisch	Nominated
2009	Tony Award	Best Choreography	Andy Blankenbuehler	Nominated
