= List of events held at Rogers Place =

Rogers Place is a multipurpose indoor arena in Edmonton. This is a list of past and upcoming events held at the arena.

== List of events ==
Musical events
Sports events
Other entertainment events

Date	Event	Notes	Ref
September 16, 2016	Keith Urban	Ripcord World Tour	
September 17, 2016	Dolly Parton	Pure & Simple Tour	
September 20–21, 2016	Drake and Future	Summer Sixteen Tour	
September 29, 2016	Dixie Chicks	DCX MMXVI World Tour	
October 13, 2016	Carrie Underwood	Storyteller Tour: Stories in the Round	
October 15, 2016	Kanye West	Saint Pablo Tour	
October 22, 2016	John Fogerty	Rollin' on the River	
November 5, 2016	Chicago and Earth, Wind & Fire	Heart and Soul Tour 2.0	
November 8, 2016	2016 CHL Canada/Russia Series	WHL All-Stars vs. Russia Selects	
November 18, 2016	Florida Georgia Line	Dig Your Roots Tour	
November 30, 2016	Amy Schumer	Amy Schumer Tour	
December 22–26, 2016	Cirque du Soleil	Toruk - The First Flight	
February 17–19, & 23–25, 2017 (9 Concerts)	Garth Brooks and Trisha Yearwood	The Garth Brooks World Tour with Trisha Yearwood	
March 31, 2017	The Lumineers	Cleopatra World Tour	
April 17, 2017	John Mayer	The Search for Everything World Tour	
May 6, 2017	Thomas Rhett	Home Team Tour	
May 28, 2017	Red Hot Chili Peppers	The Getaway World Tour	
June 2, 2017	Def Leppard	North American Tour	
June 3, 2017	Tim McGraw and Faith Hill	Soul2Soul The World Tour 2017	
June 7, 2017	Future	Nobody Safe Tour	
June 13, 2017	Tool		
July 1, 2017	Sarah McLachlan	Canada 150 in 150 Celebrations	
July 4, 2017	Queen + Adam Lambert	Queen + Adam Lambert Tour 2017	
July 10, 2017	Duran Duran	Paper Gods on Tour	
July 14, 2017	Matchbox 20 and Counting Crows	A Brief History of Everything Tour 2017	
July 19, 2017	Bob Dylan	Never Ending Tour 2017	
July 25–26, 2017	Ed Sheeran	÷ Tour	
July 30–31, 2017	Bruno Mars	24K Magic World Tour	
August 3, 2017	Lady Gaga	Joanne World Tour	
August 18, 2017	OneRepublic	Honda Civic Tour	
September 1, 2017	Lionel Richie and Mariah Carey	All the Hits Tour	
September 9, 2017	UFC 215: Nunes vs. Shevchenko 2		
September 26–27, 2017	Coldplay	A Head Full of Dreams Tour	
September 28, 2017	Nickelback	Feed The Machine Tour	
October 2, 2017	The Weeknd	Starboy: Legend of the Fall Tour	
October 10, 2017	Imagine Dragons	Evolve Tour	
October 11, 2017	Arcade Fire	Infinite Content Tour	
October 13, 2017	Kings of Leon	Walls Tour	
October 24–25, 2017	Roger Waters	Us + Them Tour	
October 27, 2017	Depeche Mode	Global Spirit Tour	
November 9–11, 2017	PBR Global Cup		
December 9, 2017	Jay-Z	4:44 Tour	
February 6, 2018	Old Dominion	Happy Endings World Tour	
February 15, 2018	Avenged Sevenfold	The Stage World Tour	
March 7, 2018	Brantley Gilbert	The Ones That Like Me Tour	
March 12, 2018	Santana	Divination Tour	
March 22, 2018	Hedley	Cageless Tour	
March 23, 2018	Michelle Obama		
March 23, 2018	Jeff Dunham	Passively Aggressive Tour	
April 6, 2018	Rod Stewart		
April 22, 2018	Steve Miller Band with Peter Frampton		
May 9–10, 2018	Shania Twain	Shania Now Tour	
May 15, 2018	The Eagles		
May 18, 2018	Queens of the Stone Age	Villains World Tour	
June 8, 2018	Bryan Adams	The Ultimate Tour	
June 9, 2018	Kevin Hart		
June 27, 2018	Vance Joy	Nation of Two Tour	
September 9, 2018	Smashing Pumpkins	Shiny And Oh So Bright Tour	
September 10, 2018	Sam Smith	The Thrill of It All Tour	
September 22, 2018	Keith Urban	Graffiti U World Tour	
September 30, 2018	Paul McCartney	Freshen Up Tour	
October 22, 2018	Foo Fighters	Concrete and Gold Tour	
November 2, 2018	Jack White	Boarding House Reach Tour	
November 6–7, 2018	Drake	Aubrey & the Three Amigos Tour	
November 9, 2018	Russell Peters	Deported World Tour	
January 18, 2019	Jim Gaffigan		
January 24, 2019	Dierks Bentley	Burning Man Tour	
January 26, 2019	Harlem Globetrotters	World Tour 2019	
January 31, 2019	Arkells	Rally Cry Tour	
February 2, 2019	Paul Brandt	The Journey Tour	
February 6–7, 2019	Justin Timberlake	The Man of the Woods Tour	
February 20, 2019	Snoop Dogg	Snoop Dogg & Friends Tour	
February 24, 2019	Little Big Town	The Breakers Tour	
March 12, 2019	Lynyrd Skynyrd	The Last of the Street Survivors Farewell Tour	
March 15, 2019	WWE	WWE Live: Road to WrestleMania	
March 22, 2019	Michelle Obama		
April 15, 2019	Michael Bublé	An Evening with Michael Bublé	
April 25, 2019	Ariana Grande	Sweetener World Tour	
May 3, 2019	Godsmack		
May 10, 2019	Thomas Rhett		
May 15, 2019	Twenty One Pilots	The Bandito Tour	
May 17, 2019	Vanilla Ice	I Love the 90's Tour	
May 25, 2019	Cher	Here We Go Again Tour	
May 28, 2019	Carrie Underwood	Cry Pretty Tour 360	
June 11, 2019	Judas Priest	Firepower World Tour	
June 16, 2019	Shawn Mendes	Shawn Mendes: The Tour	
June 20, 2019	Oprah Winfrey		
June 21, 2019	Corey Hart	The Never Surrender Tour	
June 30, 2019	Pentatonix	Pentatonix: The World Tour	
July 4, 2019	Khalid	Free Spirit World Tour	
July 25, 2019	Backstreet Boys	DNA World Tour	
July 27, 2019	UFC 240: Holloway vs. Edgar		
July 29, 2019	Def Leppard	Hits Canada	
August 30, 2019	Iron Maiden	Legacy of the Beast Tour	
September 21, 2019	WWE	WWE Live	
September 23, 2019	Ghost	A Pale Tour Named Death	
September 27–28, 2019	Elton John	Farewell Yellow Brick Road Tour	
October 11, 2019	Luke Combs	Beer Never Broke My Heart Tour	
October 15, 2019	John Fogerty	My 50 Year Trip	
October 19, 2019	Dallas Smith & Dean Brody	Friends Don't Let Friends Tour Alone	
November 12, 2019	Fleetwood Mac		
November 13, 2019	City and Colour		
August 1–September 28, 2020	2020 Stanley Cup playoffs	Western Conference early rounds, Conference finals	
September 19–28, 2020	2020 Stanley Cup Final		
January 09, 2022	Harlem Globetrotters	World Tour 2022	
January 22, 2020	Alexisonfire		
April 13, 2022	Imagine Dragons	Mercury Tour	
April 15, 2022	Slipknot	Knotfest Roadshow 2022	
May 9, 2022	James Taylor & Jackson Browne		
May 11, 2022	Chris Stapleton	Chris Stapleton's All-American Road Show Goes to Canada	
May 15, 2022	Stars On Ice	Stars On Ice - Canada	
May 19, 2022	Avril Lavigne	Bite Me 2022 Canada Tour	
June 18, 2022	Trevor Noah	Back to Abnormal	
June 27, 2022	Russell Peters	Act Your Age World Tour	
July 5, 2022	Shawn Mendes	Wonder, The World Tour	
July 13–17, 2022	Cirque Du Soleil	Cirque Du Soleil: OVO	
July 20, 2022	John Fogerty		
July 22, 2022	Alanis Morissette with special guest Garbage		
August 5, 2022	Maroon 5		
August 7, 2022	The Lumineers	BRIGHTSIDE World Tour	
August 26, 2022	Backstreet Boys	DNA World Tour	
August 27, 2022	Greta Van Fleet	Dreams In Gold Tour 2022	
September 13, 2022	Roger Waters	This Is Not a Drill	
September 17, 2022	Rod Stewart		
September 26, 2022	WWE	Monday Night Raw	
October 2, 2022	Utah Jazz @ Toronto Raptors	NBA Canada Series	
October 29, 2022	Arkells		
November 11–12, 2022	PBR Canada	Canada National Finals	
January 8, 2023	Harlem Globetrotters	2023 World Tour	
July 22-23, 2023	Monster Jam		
August 4, 2023	Avenged Sevenfold	Life Is but a Dream... Tour	
September 11, 2023	50 Cent	The Final Lap Tour	
October 18, 2023	Jordan Davis	The Damn Good Time World Tour	
October 19, 2023	Guns N' Roses	Guns N' Roses 2023 Tour	
October 24, 2023	The Doobie Brothers	The Doobie Brothers 50th Anniversary Tour	
October 25, 2023	Tool		
November 9, 2023	Burna Boy	I Told Them... Tour	
November 10, 2023	Kiss	End of the Road Tour	
November 12, 2023	Shania Twain	Queen of Me Tour	
November 14, 2023	Jonas Brothers	Five Albums. One Night. The World Tour	
November 17–18, 2023	PBR Canada	PBR Canada National Finals	
November 21, 2023	Depeche Mode	Memento Mori World Tour	
November 30, 2023	Jeff Dunham	Still not Cancelled	
December 27–31, 2023	Cirque Du Soleil	Cirque Du Soleil: Corteo	
February 10, 2024	City and Colour with Nathaniel Rateliff & The Night Sweats		
March 9, 2024	Journey	Freedom Tour 2024	
March 10, 2024	Harlem Globetrotters	2024 World Tour	
March 29, 2024	Noah Kahan	We'll All Be Here Forever Tour	
May 4, 2024	Seattle Storm vs. Los Angeles Sparks	WNBA Canada Game	
June 13, 15, and 21, 2024	Game 3, Game 4, and Game 6 of the 2024 Stanley Cup Final vs. Florida Panthers	Game 3 on June 13, Game 4 on June 15, and Game 6 on June 21	
September 6, 2024	WWE	Friday Night SmackDown	
November 2, 2024	UFC Fight Night: Moreno vs. Albazi		
November 8-9, 2024	PBR Canada	PBR Canada National Finals	
January 12, 2025	Harlem Globetrotters	2025 World Tour	
February 16, 2025	Toronto Sceptres vs. Ottawa Charge	PWHL Takeover Tour	
June 4, 6, and 14, 2025	Game 1, Game 2, and Game 5 of the 2025 Stanley Cup Final vs. Florida Panthers	Game 1 on June 4, Game 2 on June 6, and Game 5 on June 14	
November 14–15, 2025	PBR Canada	PBR Canada National Finals	
December 27, 2025	Minnesota Frost vs. Vancouver Goldeneyes	PWHL Takeover Tour	
January 11, 2026	Harlem Globetrotters	100 Year Tour	
April 7, 2026	Boston Fleet vs. Vancouver Goldeneyes	PWHL Takeover Tour	
July 3, 2026	A$AP Rocky	Don’t Be Dumb World Tour	
September 23, 2026	Bring Me The Horizon	The Third Ascension Program	
October 7, 2026	Canadian Finals Rodeo	CFR 52	
October 17, 2026	UFC Fight Night: Buckley vs. Malott		
