= Pure & Simple Tour =

2016–17 concert tour by Dolly Parton

- Tour by Dolly Parton
- Promotional poster for tour
- Location: North America
- Associated album: Pure & Simple
- Start date: June 3, 2016
- End date: December 10, 2016
- Legs: 1
- No. of shows: 65 in North America

Dolly Parton concert chronology
- Blue Smoke World Tour (2014); Pure & Simple Tour (2016)

The Pure & Simple Tour was the twelfth and final headlining concert tour by American country music artist, Dolly Parton. The tour supported the singer's 43rd studio album, Pure & Simple. It was marketed as Parton's biggest tour in North America, with over sixty shows performed in 2016. The tour began on June 3, 2016 in Greensboro, North Carolina and concluded on December 10, 2016 in Thackerville, Oklahoma.

== Background ==
The tour was announced March 6, 2016 on Parton's official website. A press conference was held the following day providing additional details concerning the tour. The trek is coined as Parton's biggest tour in 25 years. 64 dates are planned in the United States and Canada, visiting the most requested markets missed on previous tours. Alongside the tour; the singer's latest album, Pure & Simple was released worldwide on August 19. Parton explained a tour was not planned due to her busy schedule. In August 2015, the singer performed two sold-out shows at the Ryman Auditorium in Nashville. The scaled down shows sparked Parton's interest in returning to the stage.

Previous tours saw a majority of shows in Europe and Australia. Parton states her lack of hits in the U.S. for the past 20 years pushed focus on other territories. With this tour, Parton will move away from her typical big productions and perform a minimalist show in an intimate setting. This will allow the singer to perform in venues of all sizes. The show will feature songs with an acoustic sound, few interludes and more interaction with the audience.

To further describe the show, Parton stated:

"We're so excited to get out there and see the fans again. I'm really looking forward to singing songs the fans have not heard in a while, as well as the hits, while debuting a few new ones off Pure & Simple"

== Setlist ==
The following songs were performed during the June 4, 2016 concert at the Infinite Energy Arena in Duluth, GA. It does not represent all concerts during the tour.

1. "Train, Train"
2. "Pure & Simple"
3. "Why'd You Come in Here Lookin' Like That?"
4. "Jolene"
5. "Precious Memories"
6. "My Tennessee Mountain Home"
7. "Coat of Many Colors"
8. "Smoky Mountain Memories"
9. "Applejack"
10. "Rocky Top"
11. "Banks of the Ohio"
12. "American Pie" / "If I Had a Hammer"
13. "Blowin' in the Wind"
14. "The Night They Drove Old Dixie Down"
15. "The Seeker"
16. "I'll Fly Away"

Intermission

1. "Baby I'm Burning" / "Great Balls of Fire" / "Girl on Fire"
2. "Outside Your Door"
3. "The Grass Is Blue"
4. "Those Memories of You"
5. "Do I Ever Cross Your Mind?"
6. "Little Sparrow"
7. "Two Doors Down"
8. "Here You Come Again"
9. "Islands in the Stream"
10. "9 to 5"

Encore

27. "I Will Always Love You"
28. "Hello God" / "He's Alive"

== Tour dates ==
Date	City	Country	Venue	Attendance	Revenue
North America
June 3, 2016	Greensboro	United States	Greensboro Coliseum	—N/a	
June 4, 2016	Duluth	United States	Infinite Energy Arena	8,175 / 8,175	$746,735
June 5, 2016	Greenville	United States	Peace Concert Hall	—N/a	—N/a
June 7, 2016	Charleston	United States	Charleston Civic Center Coliseum	—N/a	—N/a
June 8, 2016	Vienna	United States	Filene Center	—N/a	—N/a
June 10, 2016	Northfield	United States	Hard Rock Live	—N/a	—N/a
June 11, 2016	Cincinnati	United States	The Shoe at Horseshoe Casino	—N/a	—N/a
June 12, 2016	Lewiston	United States	Artpark Outdoor Amphitheater	—N/a	—N/a
June 15, 2016	Philadelphia	United States	Mann Center for the Performing Arts	4,114 / 5,093	$405,376
June 17, 2016	Lenox	United States	Koussevitzky Music Shed	—N/a	—N/a
June 18, 2016	Bangor	United States	Darling's Waterfront Pavilion	—N/a	—N/a
June 21, 2016	Boston	United States	Wang Theatre	3,003 / 3,561	$386,609
June 22, 2016	Wilkes-Barre	United States	Mohegan Sun Arena at Casey Plaza	—N/a	
June 25, 2016	New York City	United States	Forest Hills Stadium	9,263 / 12,887	$1,055,126
June 26, 2016	Holmdel Township	United States	PNC Bank Arts Center	—N/a	—N/a
June 28, 2016	Pittsburgh	United States	Consol Energy Center	—N/a	—N/a
July 19, 2016	Cedar Rapids	United States	U.S. Cellular Center	4,546 / 5,560	$364,308
July 20, 2016	Hinckley	United States	Grand Casino Hinckley Amphitheater	—N/a	—N/a
July 22, 2016	Sioux Falls	United States	Denny Sanford Premier Center	5,027 / 5,978	$489,924
July 23, 2016	Deadwood	United States	Deadwood Mountain Grand Event Center	—N/a	—N/a
July 26, 2016	Orem	United States	UCCU Center	—N/a	—N/a
July 27, 2016	Morrison	United States	Red Rocks Amphitheatre	—N/a	—N/a
July 29, 2016	Kansas City	United States	Sprint Center	—N/a	—N/a
July 30, 2016	St. Louis	United States	Scottrade Center	—N/a	—N/a
August 2, 2016^{[A]}	Columbus	United States	Celeste Center	—N/a	—N/a
August 3, 2016	Fort Wayne	United States	Allen County War Memorial Coliseum	5,324 / 5,476	$319,624
August 4, 2016	Windsor	Canada	The Colosseum at Caesars Windsor	—N/a	
August 6, 2016	Grand Rapids	United States	Van Andel Arena	5,195 / 5,552	$489,002
August 7, 2016^{[B]}	Highland Park	United States	Ravinia Park Pavilion	—N/a	—N/a
August 9, 2016	Danville	United States	Norton Center for the Arts	—N/a	—N/a
August 10, 2016	Evansville	United States	Ford Center	6,508 / 8,392	$627,145
August 12, 2016	Tulsa	United States	BOK Center	6,112 / 6,579	$543,662
August 13, 2016	North Little Rock	United States	Verizon Arena	7,669 / 13,000	—N/a
September 9, 2016	Toronto	Canada	Molson Canadian Amphitheatre	—N/a	—N/a
September 10, 2016	Sault Ste Marie	Canada	Essar Centre	—N/a	—N/a
September 12, 2016	Winnipeg	Canada	MTS Centre	—N/a	—N/a
September 13, 2016	Moose Jaw	Canada	Mosaic Place	—N/a	—N/a
September 16, 2016	Calgary	Canada	Scotiabank Saddledome	—N/a	—N/a
September 17, 2016	Edmonton	Canada	Rogers Place	—N/a	—N/a
September 19, 2016	Vancouver	Canada	Rogers Arena	—N/a	—N/a
September 21, 2016	Kent	United States	ShoWare Center	—N/a	—N/a
September 22, 2016	Airway Heights	United States	Northern Quest Outdoor Concert Venue	—N/a	—N/a
September 24, 2016	Mountain View	United States	Shoreline Amphitheatre	11,951 / 22,000	$646,203
September 25, 2016	Santa Barbara	United States	Santa Barbara Bowl	—N/a	—N/a
September 27, 2016	San Diego	United States	Valley View Casino Center	—N/a	—N/a
September 28, 2016	Paso Robles	United States	Vina Robles Amphitheatre	2,949 / 2,949	$340,290
September 30, 2016	Laughlin	United States	Laughlin Event Center	—N/a	
October 1, 2016	Los Angeles	United States	Hollywood Bowl	28,321 / 31,957	$2,509,209
October 2, 2016	Los Angeles	United States	Hollywood Bowl	28,321 / 31,957	$2,509,209
November 15, 2016	Pigeon Forge	United States	LeConte Center	—N/a	—N/a
November 16, 2016	Huntsville	United States	Von Braun Center Arena	—N/a	—N/a
November 18, 2016	North Charleston	United States	North Charleston Coliseum	—N/a	—N/a
November 19, 2016	Charlotte	United States	Spectrum Center	—N/a	—N/a
November 26, 2016	Tampa	United States	Amalie Arena	6,699 / 6,699	$612,289
November 27, 2016	Sunrise	United States	BB&T Center	5,342 / 6,183	$407,227
November 29, 2016	Pensacola	United States	Pensacola Bay Center	6,581 / 6,581	$551,787
November 30, 2016	New Orleans	United States	Smoothie King Center	—N/a	
December 2, 2016	Corpus Christi	United States	American Bank Center Arena	4,701 / 8,452	$350,161
December 3, 2016	Grand Prairie	United States	Verizon Theatre at Grand Prairie	—N/a	—N/a
December 5, 2016	Houston	United States	NRG Arena	—N/a	—N/a
December 6, 2016	Austin	United States	Frank Erwin Center	10,504 / 10,504	$906,981
December 8, 2016	San Antonio	United States	Tobin Center for the Performing Arts	—N/a	—N/a
December 9, 2016	Thackerville	United States	Global Event Center at WinStar World Casino and Resort	—N/a	—N/a
December 10, 2016	Thackerville	United States	Global Event Center at WinStar World Casino and Resort	—N/a	—N/a
TOTAL				141,984 / 175,578	$11,751,658

Festivals and other miscellaneous performances
^{A} Ohio State Fair
^{B} Ravinia Festival

Cancellations and rescheduled shows

Date	City, State	Venue	Reason
September 10, 2016	Seguin, Ontario	Foley Fair Grounds	Due to scheduling conflict
