= Porter & Dolly =

Studio album by Porter Wagoner and Dolly Parton
- Released: August 4, 1980
- Recorded: May 22, 1968–December 14, 1979
- Studios: RCA Studio B (Nashville); Fireside Studio (Nashville)
- Genre: Country
- Length: 26:30
- Label: RCA Victor
- Producer: Porter Wagoner

Porter Wagoner and Dolly Parton chronology
Say Forever You'll Be Mine (1975)	Porter & Dolly (1980)	Just Between You and Me: The Complete Recordings, 1967 - 1976 (2014)

Dolly Parton chronology
Dolly, Dolly, Dolly (1980)	Porter & Dolly (1980)	9 to 5 and Odd Jobs (1980)

Singles from Porter & Dolly
- 1. "Making Plans" Released: June 2, 1980; 2. "If You Go, I'll Follow You" Released: October 13, 1980

Porter & Dolly is the thirteenth and final collaborative studio album by Porter Wagoner and Dolly Parton. It was released on August 4, 1980, by RCA Victor. The album is made up of previously unreleased material recorded during Wagoner and Parton's duet years (1967–76), with new studio overdubs. It was released as part of a settlement from legal action Wagoner took against Parton following her departure from his band and syndicated television series. Two singles were released from the album. "Making Plans" peaked at number two on the Billboard Hot Country Singles chart and "If You Go, I'll Follow You" peaked at number 12.

In 2014, Bear Family Records released Just Between You and Me: The Complete Recordings, 1967-1976. It contains the complete duet recordings made by Wagoner and Parton during their partnership, including the original masters of the songs from this album, without the overdubs.

== Background ==
Wagoner and Parton recorded "Here Comes the Freedom Train" in 1973, their only non-RCA single, as a fundraiser for a bicentennial train that was going to be traveling America with a museum car featuring the nation's historic documents on display. Around this time Wagoner had begun to urge Parton to write less about her East Tennessee home and the vanishing rural lifestyle. Wagoner later told CMT, "I had a pretty long talk with her about it. I said, 'Dolly, the people who live in Idaho and Canada don't care if your mama's got an old black kettle or if your dad has working boots. They know about love. You need to write some love songs."

That was on Parton's mind one night while she was sitting by the fireplace at her home in Antioch, Tennessee. She had decided to write a song of farewell, which ended up being "I Will Always Love You". Parton told CMT, "I absolutely remember where I was sitting, the time of night and everything. I was having so much trouble leaving Porter's show...We'd had great success, [but] we had a lot of problems. We didn't get along very well, but we loved each other, too...But he wouldn't hear me out. He just couldn't listen to me, and so I thought, 'The only way I'm gonna express what I feel and have him understand is to write a song.' I wrote it in a couple of hours. It just felt so right to get it all out. And while I was at it, I wrote "Jolene". A lot of people don't know that I wrote those two songs on the same night, the same writing session."

The next day Parton went to Wagoner's office and sang "I Will Always Love You" for him. Wagoner told her she could go, as long as he could produce that song. They performed their last show together in June 1974, although Wagoner continued to produce Parton's albums through 1976's All I Can Do.

Wagoner filed a $3 million lawsuit against Parton on March 21, 1979, alleging breach of contract. The lawsuit sought an accounting of Parton's net income and record royalties to the date of judgment, 15% of her net income from June 1974 through June 1979, and 15% of her record royalties from the date the payments ceased to the date of judgment. Wagoner hoped for the court to issue a declaratory judgment that Parton "is liable under contract to pay Porter Wagoner 15% of her record royalties earned from the date of judgment for so long as she receives such record royalties." As an alternative to this, Wagoner sought $2 million for "future loss of income from Dolly Parton's net income and record royalties." The suit was settled out of court, with Parton later saying, "It took me a while to pay it off, but he got the first million dollars I ever made."

Rumors began to circulate in November 1979 that Wagoner and Parton were discussing recording a new duet album in 1980 following the settlement of the lawsuit. This turned out to be partially true. The resulting album was made up of songs the pair had recorded between 1967 and 1976 overdubbed with new instrumentation. Wagoner and Parton were reportedly not on speaking terms and would not reunite in person, so the cover photo is actually a composite of two separate photos edited together.

== Critical reception ==
Professional ratings
Review scores
Source	Rating
AllMusic	3/5 stars
The Encyclopedia of Popular Music	4/5 stars

A positive review of the album from Billboard said, "An encore album from this once red-hot country pairing takes Parton and Wagoner through a series of songs heavy on heartbreak and guitars. Simple arrangements by Wagoner, solid harmony bolstered by some smooth background singing and upfront keyboard work and strings provide a good balance in molding these two dissimilar voices." The review noted "Making Plans", "Someone Just Like You", "Touching Memories", and "If You Say I Can" as the best cuts on the album.

Although they made mention of the age of the material on the album, Cashbox also gave a positive review of the album, saying, "This package of never before released material dates back to pre-1976, when the duet was as hot as this summer's heatwave. Except for a few minor touch-ups, the material is as it was recorded in the Parton-Wagoner heyday. Even though this album was actually recorded at least four years ago, the material and distinctive Parton-Wagoner vocals are timeless."

== Commercial performance ==
The album debuted at number 67 on the Billboard Hot Country LPs chart, eventually peaking at number nine in its sixth week, where it remained for two weeks. It spent a total of 31 weeks on the chart.

The album's first single, "Making Plans", was released in June 1980 and peaked at number two on the Billboard Hot Country Singles chart and number 38 in Canada on the RPM Country Singles chart. The second single, "If You Go, I'll Follow You", was released in October 1980 and peaked at number twelve on the Billboard Hot Country Singles chart.

== Recording ==
All ten of the album's tracks were recorded on ten different dates between 1968 and 1976. The two newest tracks on the album, "Touching Memories" and "Someone Just Like You", were the only two tracks from their respective April 22 and 26, 1976 sessions to be released until the 2014 box set Just Between You and Me: The Complete Recordings, 1967–1976. "Hide Me Away" was recorded during a May 24, 1974 session for 1974's Porter 'n' Dolly. "If You Say I Can" was the first track to be released from a December 5, 1973 session and is possibly the only surviving track from this session as none of the other songs recorded included on the 2014 box set. "Beneath the Sweet Magnolia Tree" was recorded during the February 13, 1973 session for 1973's Love and Music. "Singing on the Mountain" and "Little David's Harp" were recorded during sessions for 1973's We Found It on August 21 and 22, 1972, respectively. "If You Go, I'll Follow You" was the second track to be released from the September 29, 1971 session. "Daddy Did His Best" was recorded during a session on December 2, 1970, for 1971's Two of a Kind. The oldest track included on the album, "Making Plans", was recorded on May 22, 1968, during a session for 1968's Just the Two of Us.

Overdub sessions for the album took place on November 23, December 3, December 7, December 11, and December 14, 1979, at Fireside Studio in Nashville, Tennessee. The producer of these sessions was Jerry Bradley.

== Track listing ==
Side one
No.	Title	Writer(s)	Recording date	Length
1.	"Making Plans"	Johnny Russell; Voni Morrison	May 22, 1968	2:12
2.	"If You Go, I'll Follow You"	Dolly Parton; Porter Wagoner	September 29, 1971	2:39
3.	"Hide Me Away"	Parton	May 24, 1974	3:05
4.	"Someone Just Like You"	Joe Hudgins	April 29, 1976	3:08
5.	"Little David's Harp"	Parton	August 22, 1972	3:05

Side two
No.	Title	Writer(s)	Recording date	Length
1.	"Beneath the Sweet Magnolia Tree"	Parton	February 13, 1973	2:22
2.	"Touching Memories"	Wagoner; Tom Pick	April 22, 1976	2:27
3.	"Daddy Did His Best"	Jerry Chesnut	December 2, 1970	2:45
4.	"If You Say I Can"	Parton	December 5, 1973	2:23
5.	"Singing on the Mountain"	Wagoner	August 21, 1972	2:24

== Personnel ==
Adapted from the album liner notes.

- Stu Basore – steel guitar
- Jerry Bradley – producer (overdub sessions)
- Herb Burnette – art director
- Bobby Dyson – bass
- Bob Ferguson – producer (original masters prior to the overdubs)
- Sudie Calloway – background vocals
- Ed Caraeff – photography (Dolly Parton)
- Chuck Cochran – string arrangements
- Jim Colvard – electric guitar
- Rita Figlio – background vocals
- R.E. Hardaway – drums
- Jim Isbell – drums
- K&S Photographics – special photo effects
- Benny Kennerson – piano
- Dave Kirby – electric guitar, acoustic guitar
- Mike Lawler – piano
- Wayne Moss – acoustic guitar
- Fred Newell – electric guitar, acoustic guitar
- Bill Noss – lettering
- Dolly Parton – lead vocals
- Tom Pick – engineer
- Hope Powell – photography (Porter Wagoner)
- Hargus Robbins – piano
- Roy Shockley – engineer
- Porter Wagoner – lead vocals, producer, arrangements
- Curtis Young – background vocals

== Charts ==
Album

Chart (1980)	Peak position
US Hot Country LP's (Billboard)	9

Singles

Title	Year	Peak position	
Title	Year	US Country	CAN Country
"Making Plans"	1980	2	38
"If You Go, I'll Follow You"	1980	12	—
