= Jeff Calhoun (choreographer) =

American director and choreographer

- Born: 1960 (age 65–66); Pittsburgh, Pennsylvania, U.S.
- Occupations: Theatre director, choreographer, producer, dancer
- Years active: 1982–present

Jeff Calhoun (born 1960) is an American director, choreographer, producer and dancer.

== Career ==
As a student at Richland High School, now Pine-Richland High School (Gibsonia, PA; North of Pittsburgh), Calhoun was interested in both athletics and performance, playing football and studying tap dance. He danced in the ensemble at The Kenley Players in Ohio in the late 1970s where he met Tommy Tune. Tune later hired Calhoun to perform in the First National Tour of The Best Little Whorehouse in Texas. Calhoun made his Broadway debut in the stage adaptation of Seven Brides for Seven Brothers (1982). He also starred opposite Twiggy in My One and Only (1983). Calhoun’s collaboration with Tommy Tune resulted in the 1991 Tony Award for Best Choreography for The Will Rogers Follies. His Broadway directing debut was Tommy Tune Tonight! (1992).

Calhoun began his association with Deaf West Theatre in 2000 when he directed and choreographed a world premiere adaptation of Oliver! Calhoun continued his work with Deaf West Theater with Big River the following season. Big River subsequently played Roundabout Theatre Company’s America Airlines Theatre in 2003 on Broadway and garnered the 2004 Tony Award for Excellence in Theater. Calhoun also directed the world premiere of the first original American Sign Language musical, Sleeping Beauty Wakes, at the Kirk Douglas Theater in 2007. In 2009, he directed and choreographed the Deaf West Theatre & Center Theater Group production of Pippin at the Mark Taper Forum, which included new and revised material from composer Stephen Schwartz.

Calhoun directed both the world premiere and international productions of Disney’s High School Musical: On Stage and Disney’s High School Musical 2: On Stage. He also provided choreography for Xena: Warrior Princess (The Bitter Suite), Downtown, Happy Together and Weekend Warriors.

Calhoun's additional Broadway credits include the first Broadway revival of Grease (1994), Annie Get Your Gun (1999), Bells Are Ringing (2001), Brooklyn The Musical (2004), and Grey Gardens (2006). Off-Broadway he appeared in One More Song/One More Dance (1983) with Ann Reinking, choreographed Bouncers (1987) and Comic Potential (2000), and directed Holy Cross Sucks! (2005). His regional theater credits include the First National Tour of Irving Berlin’s White Christmas presented by Theater of the Stars (2008), Shenandoah at the Ford’s Theater (2006) and Himself and Nora, a musical based on James Joyce and Nora Barnacle, which he choreographed and co-directed (with Joseph Hardy) for the Old Globe Theatre in 2005.

Calhoun is an Associate Artist at Ford’s Theater, Washington, DC where he directed both the 2008 Presidential Gala presentation of Frank Wildhorn’s The Civil War, and a new production of that same work as part of the Ford’s Theater 2009 reopening season.

In 2011, Calhoun directed and choreographed the Broadway musical Bonnie & Clyde, a collaboration with composer Frank Wildhorn, lyricist Don Black and librettist Ivan Menchell. The show opened at the Gerald Schoenfeld Theatre on December 1, 2011, and closed on December 30. Bonnie & Clyde had its world premiere at La Jolla Playhouse in 2009 and had another out-of-town tryout at the Asolo Repertory Theatre in Sarasota, Florida, in 2010. Calhoun also directed and choreographed the national tour of Dolly Parton's 9 to 5: The Musical, which began performances in September 2010 in Nashville, Tennessee.

Calhoun directed the Disney musical Newsies. After a run at the Paper Mill Playhouse in Millburn, New Jersey in fall 2011, Disney Theatrical Productions announced that the show would transfer to Broadway for a strictly limited engagement. Newsies, which opened at the Nederlander Theatre on March 29, 2012, and closed on Broadway on August 24, 2014. The musical has had 8 Tony Award nominations, including Best Musical and Best Director of a Musical for Calhoun.

Calhoun worked on the first revival of Jekyll & Hyde. The production, starring Constantine Maroulis and Deborah Cox, will play a 25-week national tour before landing on Broadway in Spring 2013. Calhoun also directed the UK tour of 9 to 5 in Fall 2012.

== Awards and nominations ==
- 2012 Tony Award for Best Direction of a Musical (Newsies, nominee)
- 2012 Tony Award for Best Musical (Newsies, nominee)
- 2012 Drama Desk Award for Outstanding Musical (Newsies, nominee)
- 2012 Drama Desk Award for Outstanding Musical (Bonnie & Clyde, nominee)
- 2012 Drama League Award for Distinguished Production of a Musical (Newsies, nominee)
- 2012 Outer Critics Circle Award for Outstanding Director of a Musical (Newsies, nominee)
- 2012 Outer Critics Circle Award for Outstanding New Broadway Musical (Newsies, nominee)
- 2012 Outer Critics Circle Award for Outstanding New Broadway Musical (Bonnie & Clyde, nominee)
- 2011 Craig Noel Award for Outstanding Direction of a Musical (Emma, nominee)
- 2011 Craig Noel Award for Outstanding Resident Musical (Emma, winner)
- 2009 San Diego Theatre Critics Circle Award for Best Director of a Musical (Bonnie & Clyde, winner)
- 2009 San Diego Theatre Critics Circle Award for Outstanding New Musical (Bonnie & Clyde, winner)
- 2007 Ovation Award for Direction (Sleeping Beauty Wakes, nominee)
- 2007 Ovation Award for World Premiere Musical (Sleeping Beauty Wakes, winner)
- 2006 Helen Hayes Award for Outstanding Director (Big River, nominee)
- 2004 Tony Award Tony Honor for Excellence in Theatre (Big River, winner)
- 2004 Drama Desk Award for Outstanding Director of a Musical (Big River, nominee)
- 2003 Ovation & L.A. Drama Critics Circle Awards for Direction and Choreography (Big River, winner)
- 2004 Drama Desk Award for Outstanding Director of a Musical (Big River, nominee)
- 2001 LA Weekly Theater Award for Best Director of a Musical (Big River, winner)
- 2001 Los Angeles Drama Critics Circle Award for Best Director (Big River, winner)
- 2001 Los Angeles Drama Critics Circle Award for Best Choreographer (Big River, winner)
- 2001 BackStage West Garland Award for Best Director (Big River, winner)
- 2000 Ovation Award for Best Director of a Musical (Oliver!, winner)
- 2000 Ovation Award for Best Musical (Intimate Theater) (Oliver!, winner)
- 1994 Tony Award for Best Choreography (Grease, nominee)
- 1994 Drama Desk Award for Outstanding Choreography (Grease, nominee)
