= Just Between You and Me: The Complete Recordings, 1967–1976 =

Compilation album by Dolly Parton & Porter Wagoner
- Released: May 5, 2014
- Recorded: October 10, 1967–April 22, 1976
- Genre: Country
- Label: Bear Family Records

Dolly Parton & Porter Wagoner chronology
Porter & Dolly (1980)	Just Between You and Me: The Complete Recordings, 1967–1976 (2014)

Dolly Parton chronology
Blue Smoke (2014)	Just Between You and Me: The Complete Recordings, 1967–1976 (2014)	Pure & Simple (2016)

Professional ratings
Review scores
Source	Rating
AllMusic	5/5 stars

Just Between You and Me: The Complete Recordings, 1967–1976 is a 6-CD box set compilation album by country music duo Porter Wagoner and Dolly Parton. It covers their entire recording career with RCA Victor. The box set was released on May 5, 2014, by Bear Family Records.

The ten tracks included on 1980's Porter & Dolly were overdubbed before being released. The original, undubbed masters were released for the first time on this set, with the exception of the original master of "If You Say I Can", which had previously been released as the B-side to the duo's 1976 single, "Is Forever Longer Than Always?". These original masters and all other unreleased recordings from this box set were subsequently released digitally as part of the "RCA Sessions 1968-1976" compilation.

There is only one recording that Wagoner and Parton both took part in during their duet years that does not appear on this collection, 1972's tribute to Chet Atkins, "Chet's Tune, Part 2", which features Wagoner and Parton among many others who had worked with him.

Following the end of their partnership, Wagoner and Parton would come together on record just a few more times. In 2006, they both appeared on Christie Lynn's cover of their song "Beneath the Sweet Magnolia Tree". In 2007, Parton would lend her vocals to Wagoner's song "Mother Church of Country Music", a tribute to the Grand Ole Opry, along with many other members of the Opry. Wagoner and Parton's last duet would be their 2007 recording of "Drifting Too Far from the Shore".

== Track listing ==
Disc 1: 1967–1968
No.	Title	Writer(s)	Recording date	Length
1.	"Just Between You and Me"	Jack Clement	October 10, 1967	2:22
2.	"Before I Met You"	Charles L. Seitz, Joe Lewis, Elmer Rader	October 10, 1967	1:56
3.	"Two Sides to Every Story"	Dolly Parton, Bill Owens	October 10, 1967	2:23
4.	"Mommie, Ain't That Daddy?"	Parton	October 10, 1967	3:15
5.	"Four O Thirty Three"	B. Owens, Earl Montgomery	October 11, 1967	2:49
6.	"Love Is Worth Living"	Parton	October 11, 1967	2:44
7.	"The Last Thing on My Mind"	Tom Paxton	October 11, 1967	2:38
8.	"Sorrow's Tearing Down the House (That Happiness Once Built)"	Mel Tillis, Kent Westberry	October 11, 1967	2:27
9.	"Home Is Where the Hurt Is"	Fred MacRae, Marge Barton	October 12, 1967	2:16
10.	"This Time Has Gotta Be Our Last Time"	B. Owens	October 12, 1967	2:32
11.	"Put It Off Until Tomorrow"	Parton, B. Owens	October 12, 1967	2:24
12.	"Because One of Us Was Wrong"	Parton, B. Owens	October 12, 1967	2:08
13.	"Slip Away Today"	Curly Putman	January 31, 1968	2:42
14.	"Holding On to Nothin'"	Jerry Chesnut	January 31, 1968	2:31
15.	"Just the Two of Us"	Chesnut	May 20, 1968	2:41
16.	"Closer by the Hour"	Al Gore	May 20, 1968	2:20
17.	"Afraid to Love Again"	Chesnut, Theresa Beaty	May 20, 1968	1:59
18.	"I Washed My Face in the Morning Dew"	Tom T. Hall	May 21, 1968	2:49
19.	"Jeannie's Afraid of the Dark"	Parton	May 21, 1968	2:50
20.	"The Party"	Parton	May 21, 1968	2:58
21.	"I Can"	Parton	May 21, 1968	2:09
22.	"We'll Get Ahead Someday"	Mack Magaha	May 22, 1968	1:59
23.	"The Dark End of the Street"	Dan Penn, Chips Moman	May 22, 1968	2:19
24.	"Somewhere Between"	Merle Haggard	May 22, 1968	2:17
25.	"Making Plans (Original Master)" (Previously Unreleased)	Johnny Russell, Voni Morrison	May 22, 1968	2:14
26.	"Malena"	Parton	December 3, 1968	2:27
27.	"Good as Gold (Alternate Version)" (Previously Unreleased)	Paul Martin	December 3, 1968	2:53
28.	"One by One" (Previously Unreleased)	Johnnie Wright, Jack Anglin, Jim Anglin	December 3, 1968	2:43
29.	"Good as Gold"	Martin	December 20, 1968	2:33
30.	"Yours Love"	Harlan Howard	December 20, 1968	2:34
Total length:				74:34

Disc 2: 1969–1970
No.	Title	Writer(s)	Recording date	Length
1.	"Just Someone I Used to Know"	Clement	April 21, 1969	2:25
2.	"No Reason to Hurry Home"	Parton	April 21, 1969	2:29
3.	"Milwaukee, Here I Come"	Lee Fikes	April 21, 1969	2:16
4.	"The House Where Love Lives"	Leona Reese	April 21, 1969	2:05
5.	"Why Don't You Haul Off And Love Me?"	Wayne Raney, Lonnie Glosson	April 22, 1969	1:55
6.	"Mendy Never Sleeps"	Parton	April 22, 1969	2:09
7.	"I Don't Believe You've Met My Baby"	Autry Inman	April 22, 1969	2:13
8.	"Anything's Better Than Nothing"	Marie Wilson	April 23, 1969	2:18
9.	"Always, Always"	Joyce McCord	April 23, 1969	2:39
10.	"My Hands Are Tied"	Parton	April 23, 1969	2:36
11.	"There Never Was a Time"	Myra Smith, Margaret Lewis	April 23, 1969	2:30
12.	"Forty Miles from Poplar Bluff"	Frank Dycus	December 1, 1969	2:52
13.	"Each Season Changes You"	Ruth Talley	December 1, 1969	2:35
14.	"Daddy Was an Old Time Preacher Man (Alternate Version)" (Previously Unreleased)	Parton, Dorothy Jo Hope	December 1, 1969	2:46
15.	"Tangled Vines"	Damon Black	December 2, 1969	2:08
16.	"We Can't Let This Happen to Us"	Hope	December 2, 1969	2:11
17.	"Tomorrow Is Forever"	Parton	December 2, 1969	2:50
18.	"Silver Sandals"	Parton	December 2, 1969	2:42
19.	"No Love Left"	B. Owens	December 3, 1969	2:03
20.	"I'm Wasting Your Time and You're Wasting Mine"	Parton	December 3, 1969	2:24
21.	"Run That by Me One More Time"	Parton	December 3, 1969	2:20
22.	"It Might as Well Be Me"	Parton, Hope	December 3, 1969	2:16
23.	"I Know You're Married But I Love You Still"	Don Reno, Magaha	April 21, 1970	2:25
24.	"Daddy Was an Old Time Preacher Man"	Parton, Hope	April 21, 1970	3:04
25.	"Fight and Scratch"	Parton	April 21, 1970	2:38
26.	"A Good Understanding"	Parton	April 21, 1970	2:44
Total length:				63:17

Disc 3: 1970–1971
No.	Title	Writer(s)	Recording date	Length
1.	"Once More"	Dusty Owens	May 5, 1970	2:34
2.	"Ragged Angel"	Parton	May 5, 1970	2:09
3.	"Before Our Weakness Gets Too Strong"	Louis Owens	May 5, 1970	2:43
4.	"Let's Live for Tonight"	Reno	May 5, 1970	2:12
5.	"One Day at a Time"	Joe Babcock	May 6, 1970	2:34
6.	"Thoughtfulness"	B. Owens	May 6, 1970	2:28
7.	"There'll Be Love"	Parton, Porter Wagoner	May 6, 1970	2:39
8.	"Daddy Did His Best (Original Master)" (Previously Unreleased)	Chesnut	December 2, 1970	2:49
9.	"Possum Holler"	Dallas Frazier	December 2, 1970	2:19
10.	"The Fighting Kind"	Parton	December 2, 1970	2:33
11.	"All I Need Is You"	Betty Jean Robsinson	December 8, 1970	3:10
12.	"Curse of the Wild Weed Flower"	Parton, L. Owens	December 8, 1970	2:18
13.	"Today, Tomorrow and Forever"	B. Owens	December 8, 1970	2:45
14.	"The Flame"	Parton	December 9, 1970	2:57
15.	"Her and the Car and the Mobile Home"	Dave Kirby, Don Stock	December 9, 1970	2:40
16.	"Is It Real?"	Parton	December 9, 1970	2:56
17.	"Two of a Kind"	Parton, Wagoner	December 14, 1970	2:40
18.	"Oh, the Pain of Loving You"	Parton, Wagoner	December 14, 1970	2:07
19.	"Better Move It on Home"	Ray Griff	December 14, 1970	2:16
20.	"The Right Combination"	Wagoner	April 7, 1971	2:57
21.	"Burning the Midnight Oil"	Wagoner	April 7, 1971	1:50
22.	"Love's All Over"	Wagoner	April 7, 1971	3:10
23.	"Take Away"	Wagoner	April 7, 1971	2:28
24.	"You and Me - Her and Him"	Wagoner	April 7, 1971	2:25
25.	"How Close They Must Be"	Wagoner	April 7, 1971	2:29
26.	"On and On"	Eddie Sovine	April 7, 1971	2:08
27.	"More Than Words Can Tell"	Wagoner	April 8, 1971	2:49
28.	"In Each Love Some Pain Must Fall"	Parton	April 8, 1971	2:06
Total length:				70:56

Disc 4: 1971–1972
No.	Title	Writer(s)	Recording date	Length
1.	"Anyplace You Want to Go"	Wagoner	September 28, 1971	2:19
2.	"Somewhere Along the Way"	Parton	September 28, 1971	3:12
3.	"The Fog Has Lifted"	Wagoner	September 28, 1971	2:23
4.	"Looking Down"	Wagoner	September 29, 1971	2:38
5.	"If You Go, I'll Follow You (Original Master)" (Previously Unreleased)	Parton, Wagoner	September 29, 1971	2:43
6.	"Waldo the Weirdo" (Previously Unreleased)	Wagoner	September 29, 1971	2:55
7.	"I've Been This Way Too Long"	Parton	September 30, 1971	2:43
8.	"Lost Forever in Your Kiss"	Parton	September 30, 1971	3:26
9.	"Sounds of Nature"	Parton, Wagoner	September 30, 1971	2:21
10.	"Through Thick and Thin"	B. Owens	September 30, 1971	2:06
11.	"We Found It"	Wagoner	April 28, 1972	2:34
12.	"Poor Folks Town"	Parton	April 28, 1972	2:44
13.	"Together You and I"	Parton	May 1, 1972	2:24
14.	"Christina"	Parton	May 1, 1972	3:05
15.	"Together Always"	Parton	May 1, 1972	2:18
16.	"Ten Four - Over and Out"	Wagoner	May 2, 1972	3:33
17.	"Singing on the Mountain (Original Master)" (Previously Unreleased)	Wagoner	August 21, 1972	2:27
18.	"Say Forever You'll Be Mine"	Parton	August 21, 1972	2:49
19.	"That's When Love Will Mean Most"	Wagoner	August 21, 1972	1:59
20.	"Love Have Mercy on Us"	Parton	August 21, 1972	2:56
21.	"Sweet Rachel Ann"	Parton	August 21, 1972	2:56
22.	"Satan's River"	Wagoner	August 21, 1972	2:38
23.	"I Am Always Waiting"	Wagoner	August 22, 1972	2:18
24.	"I've Been Married (Just as Long as You Have)"	Parton, Wagoner	August 22, 1972	2:47
25.	"Little David's Harp (Original Master)" (Previously Unreleased)	Parton	August 22, 1972	3:08
26.	"Between Us"	Parton	November 29, 1972	1:50
27.	"Love City"	Parton	November 29, 1972	2:02
28.	"In the Presence of You"	Wagoner, Tom Pick	November 29, 1972	2:49
Total length:				73:48

Disc 5: 1973–1974
No.	Title	Writer(s)	Recording date	Length
1.	"How Can I (Help You Forgive Me)"	Wagoner, Pick	February 12, 1973	1:57
2.	"Come to Me (Alternate Version)" (Previously Unreleased)	Parton	February 12, 1973	2:19
3.	"Laugh the Years Away"	Howard Tuck	February 12, 1973	2:03
4.	"There'll Always Be Music (Alternate Version)" (Previously Unreleased)	Parton	February 12, 1973	2:58
5.	"I Have No Right to Care"	Parton	February 12, 1973	2:46
6.	"Come to Me"	Parton	February 13, 1973	2:25
7.	"Beneath the Sweet Magnolia Tree (Original Master)" (Previously Unreleased)	Parton	February 13, 1973	2:28
8.	"Love Is Out Tonight"	Wagoner, Pick	February 13, 1973	2:44
9.	"If Teardrops Were Pennies"	Carl Butler	February 13, 1973	2:10
10.	"You"	Parton	February 13, 1973	2:25
11.	"There'll Always Be Music"	Parton	February 13, 1973	3:14
12.	"I Get Lonesome by Myself"	Parton	February 13, 1973	3:24
13.	"Sounds of Night"	Wagoner	April 9, 1973	2:28
14.	"Wasting Love"	Wagoner	April 9, 1973	1:52
15.	"All Aboard America"	Wagoner, Stephen H. Lemberg	October 12, 1973	3:38
16.	"Here Come the Freedom Train"	Lemberg	October 12, 1973	3:56
17.	"Too Far Gone"	Parton	May 23, 1974	2:15
18.	"Again"	Wagoner	May 23, 1974	2:31
19.	"Something to Reach For"	Parton	May 23, 1974	2:27
20.	"The Fire That Keeps You Warm"	Parton	May 23, 1974	2:13
21.	"Without You"	Parton	May 23, 1974	2:29
22.	"Sixteen Years"	Wagoner, Pick	May 23, 1974	2:54
23.	"Carolina Moonshiner" (Previously Unreleased)	Parton	May 23, 1974	1:55
24.	"If You Say I Can (Single Master)"	Parton	December 5, 1973 (Dolly); May 24, 1974 (Porter)	2:28
25.	"The Power of Love"	Wagoner	May 24, 1974	2:26
26.	"The Beginning"	Parton	May 24, 1974	3:08
27.	"Please Don't Stop Loving Me"	Parton, Wagoner	May 24, 1974	2:47
Total length:				70:06

Disc 6: 1974–1976
No.	Title	Writer(s)	Recording date	Length
1.	"Life Rides the Train"	Wagoner	May 24, 1974	2:27
2.	"Two"	Parton	May 24, 1974	2:41
3.	"Hide Me Away (Original Master)" (Previously Unreleased)	Parton	May 24, 1974	3:09
4.	"We'd Have to Be Crazy"	Parton	May 24, 1974	2:35
5.	"Love to See Us Through"	Gore, Dycus	April 15, 1975	2:17
6.	"If You Were Mine"	Randy Parton	April 15, 1975	2:52
7.	"Our Love"	Gore, Dycus	April 15, 1975	2:43
8.	"Is Forever Longer Than Always?"	Wagoner, Dycus	April 15, 1975	2:36
9.	"I Learned It Well" (Previously Unreleased)	Linda Carol Moore	April 22, 1976	2:28
10.	"Touching Memories (Original Master)" (Previously Unreleased)	Wagoner, Pick	April 22, 1976	2:28
11.	"In the Morning^{[A]}" (Previously Unreleased)	Parton	April 22, 1976	2:04
12.	"About Susanne, About Your Man^{[A]}" (Previously Unreleased)	Parton	April 22, 1976	2:54
13.	"A Fool Like Me" (Previously Unreleased)	Moore	April 29, 1976	2:34
14.	"Someone Just Like You (Original Master)" (Previously Unreleased)	Parton	April 29, 1976	3:12
15.	"The Golden Streets of Glory^{[A]}" (Previously Unreleased)	Parton	April 29, 1976	3:00
16.	"Twin Mounds of Clay^{[A]}" (Previously Unreleased)	Howard Lips	April 29, 1976	3:03
17.	"Introduction by Porter (Live)"		April 25, 1970	0:47
18.	"Run That by Me One More Time (Live)"	Parton	April 25, 1970	2:57
19.	"Jeannie's Afraid of the Dark (Live)"	Parton	April 25, 1970	2:35
20.	"Tomorrow Is Forever (Live)"	Parton	April 25, 1970	2:32
21.	"Two Sides to Every Story (Live)"	Parton, B. Owens	April 25, 1970	1:43

- ^{[A]} These tracks are presented with only Parton's vocals.
