= Say Forever You'll Be Mine =

Studio album by Porter Wagoner and Dolly Parton
- Released: August 18, 1975
- Recorded: August 21, 1972–April 15, 1975
- Studio: RCA Studio (Nashville)
- Genre: Country
- Length: 25:33
- Label: RCA Victor
- Producer: Porter Wagoner

Porter Wagoner and Dolly Parton chronology
Porter 'n' Dolly (1974)	Say Forever You'll Be Mine (1975)	Porter & Dolly (1980)

Dolly Parton chronology
Best of Dolly Parton (1975)	Say Forever You'll Be Mine (1975)	Dolly (1975)

Singles from Say Forever You'll Be Mine
- 1. "Say Forever You'll Be Mine" Released: June 16, 1975

Say Forever You'll Be Mine is the 12th collaborative studio album by Porter Wagoner and Dolly Parton. It was released on August 18, 1975, by RCA Victor. It was their last album of new material together until 1980.

== Critical reception ==
Professional ratings
Review scores
Source	Rating
AllMusic	3/5 stars
The Encyclopedia of Popular Music	3/5 stars

In the issue date August 30, 1975, Billboard published a review that said, "As always, when the pair get[s] together, a fine set of love songs giving each a chance to display their vocal wares separately, as well as working in their general perfectly succinct harmony. Dolly is enjoying her strongest period of success as a solo yet, and Wagoner is a consistent chart maker, yet together they always seem to rise to new heights. Material a bit more on the straight country side than their solo material, with the writing split as usual fairly evenly between the two. Production of Porter is excellent. Instrumentally, fiddle and guitar work in particular shines on this set."

Cashbox also published a review in their August 30 issue which said, "Running the gamut of most every phase of love, this Porter and Dolly LP includes "Something to Reach For", "If You Were Mine", "I Have No Right to Care", "The Beginning", "Our Love," "Again", "How Can I (Help You Forgive Me)", "Love to See Us Through", and of course the title song, which is also their current chart climbing single, "Say Forever You'll Be Mine". The sound is gentle and pure country, serving as a perfect foil for the cameo performance of these two great country artists."

== Commercial performance ==
The album peaked at number six on the US Billboard] Hot Country LPs chart.

The album's only single, "Say Forever You'll Be Mine", was released in June 1975 and peaked at number five on the US Billboard Hot Country Singles chart.

== Recording ==
Only three tracks on the album resulted from new recording sessions; "Our Love", "If You Were Mine", and "Love to See Us Through" were recorded during an April 15, 1975 session at RCA Studio B in Nashville, Tennessee. The seven others tracks included on the album date as far back as 1972. "Say Forever You'll Be Mine" is the oldest track included and was recorded on August 21, 1972, during a session for 1973's We Found It. "I Have No Right to Care" and "How Can I (Help You Forgive Me)" were recorded during a session for 1973's Love and Music on February 12, 1973. Four tracks were recorded during sessions for 1974's Porter 'n' Dolly. "Something to Reach For" and "Again" were recorded on May 23, 1974, while "The Beginning" and "Life Rides the Train" were recorded the following day.

== Track listing ==
Side one
No.	Title	Writer(s)	Recording date	Length
1.	"Say Forever You'll Be Mine"	Dolly Parton	August 21, 1972	2:56
2.	"Something to Reach For"	Dolly Parton	May 23, 1974	2:25
3.	"Again"	Porter Wagoner	May 23, 1974	2:25
4.	"Our Love"	Al Gore; Frank Dycus	April 15, 1975	2:37
5.	"The Beginning"	D. Parton	May 24, 1974	3:04

Side two
No.	Title	Writer(s)	Recording date	Length
1.	"I Have No Right to Care"	D. Parton	February 12, 1973	2:40
2.	"If You Were Mine"	Randy Parton	April 15, 1975	2:46
3.	"Love to See Us Through"	Gore; Dycus	April 15, 1975	2:12
4.	"How Can I (Help You Forgive Me)"	Wagoner; Tom Pick	February 12, 1973	1:55
5.	"Life Rides the Train"	Wagoner	May 24, 1974	2:33

== Charts ==
Album

Chart (1975)	Peak position
US Hot Country LP's (Billboard)	6

Singles

Title	Year	Peak position	
Title	Year	US Country	CAN Country
"Say Forever You'll Be Mine"	1975	5	1
