= 9 to 5 (soundtrack) =

Soundtrack of the 1980 film 9 to 5

Soundtrack album by Charles Fox
- Released: December 8, 1980
- Recorded: 1980
- Genre: Soundtrack
- Label: 20th Century Fox
- Producers: Charles Fox; Gregg Perry

Singles from 9 to 5
- 1. "9 to 5" Released: November 3, 1980

9 to 5 is the soundtrack album to the 1980 film of the same name. It was released on December 8, 1980, by 20th Century Fox Records. The album features selections from the score by Charles Fox and the theme song, "9 to 5", written and recorded by Dolly Parton. It became one of her biggest hits of the decade and was nominated for several awards, including the Academy Award for Best Song at the 53rd Academy Awards.

== Background ==
While filming 9 to 5, Dolly Parton found she could use her long acrylic fingernails to simulate the sound of a typewriter. She wrote the song on set by clicking her nails together and forming the beat.

== Critical reception ==
A review published in the December 20, 1980 issue of Billboard said, "The main title ("9 to 5") [is] the only track with vocals on this film score that utilizes classical music throughout. Dolly Parton's soft country vocals on the title track are complemented by innovative piano chords. Tight orchestration, effectively using brass, strings and rhythm instruments, abound on "Violet Steals Body", "Judy's Fantasy", and "Dora Lee's Fantasy." Best cuts: Those mentioned."

== Commercial performance ==
The album peaked at number 77 on the Billboard 200 and spent a total of 15 weeks on the chart.

The only single released from the soundtrack, "9 to 5", peaked at number one for two weeks on the Billboard Hot 100, as well as the Billboard Hot Country Singles chart. Additionally, it was certified platinum by the RIAA.

== Accolades ==
24th Annual Grammy Awards
Nominee / work	Award	Result	Ref.
"9 to 5"	Song of the Year	Nominated	
"9 to 5"	Best Country Vocal Performance, Female	Won	
"9 to 5"	Best Country Song	Won	
9 to 5	Best Album of Original Score Written for a Motion Picture or Television Special	Nominated	

The song "9 to 5" was nominated for several awards, including the Academy Award for Best Song at the 53rd Academy Awards. It won the 1981 People's Choice Award for Favorite Motion Picture Song at the 7th People's Choice Awards, and two 1982 Grammy Awards for Country Song of the Year and Female Country Vocal of the Year at the 24th Annual Grammy Awards.

== Track listing ==
All tracks are written by Charles Fox, except as noted.

No.	Title	Writer(s)	Length
1.	"9 to 5" (Main Title – Vocal) (performed by Dolly Parton)	Dolly Parton	2:42
2.	"Violet Steals Body"		3:35
3.	"Office Montage"		2:53
4.	"Judy's Fantasy"		2:20
5.	"Hart Tries to Escape"		2:14
6.	"Pillow Fight"		2:03
7.	"Violet's Fantasy"		4:25
8.	"Easy Time"		1:50
9.	"Dora Lee's Fantasy"		2:06
10.	"Violet's Poisoned the Boss"		2:29
11.	"Ajax Warehouse"		2:23
12.	"The Intruder"		1:39
13.	"Charlie's Bar"		1:49
14.	"9 to 5" (End Title – Vocal) (performed by Dolly Parton)	Parton	2:28

== Charts ==
Chart (1980/81)	Peak position
Australia (Kent Music Report)	33
US Billboard Top LPs & Tape	77

== Certifications ==
Region	Certification	Certified units/sales
Australia (ARIA)	3× Platinum	210,000^{‡}
^{‡} Sales+streaming figures based on certification alone.
