= Say Forever You'll Be Mine (song) =

Single by Dolly Parton and Porter Wagoner

from the album Say Forever You'll Be Mine
- B-side: "How Can I Help You Forgive Me"
- Released: August 1975
- Genre: Country
- Label: RCA Records
- Songwriter(s): Dolly Parton
- Producer(s): Porter Wagoner

Dolly Parton and Porter Wagoner singles chronology
"Please Don't Stop Loving Me" (1974)	"Say Forever You'll Be Mine" (1975)	"Is Forever Longer Than Always" (1976)

"Say Forever You'll Be Mine" is a song written and recorded by American country music artist Dolly Parton as a duet with American country music artist Porter Wagoner. It was released in August 1975 as the first single from their album Say Forever You'll Be Mine. The song peaked at number 5 on the Billboard Hot Country Singles chart. It also reached number 1 on the RPM Country Tracks chart in Canada.

== Chart performance ==
Chart (1975)	Peak position
U.S. Billboard Hot Country Singles	5
Canadian RPM Country Tracks	1
