= 9 to 5 (Dolly Parton song) =

1980 song by Dolly Parton

Single by Dolly Parton

from the album 9 to 5 and Odd Jobs
- B-side: "Sing for the Common Man"
- Released: November 1980
- Recorded: April 4, 1980
- Studio: Sound Labs (Hollywood, California)
- Genre: Country pop; disco
- Length: 2:43
- Label: RCA Victor
- Songwriter: Dolly Parton
- Producer: Gregg Perry

Dolly Parton singles chronology
"Old Flames Can't Hold a Candle to You" (1980)	"9 to 5" (1980)	"But You Know I Love You" (1981)

Music video
- "9 to 5" on YouTube

"9 to 5" is a song written by and recorded by American country music star Dolly Parton for the 1980 comedy film 9 to 5, as well as in the subsequent TV series of the same name (1982–1983, 1986–1987). In addition to appearing on the film's soundtrack, the song was the centerpiece and opening track of Parton's album 9 to 5 and Odd Jobs, released in late 1980.

Released as a single in November 1980, the song garnered Parton an Academy Award nomination for Best Original Song at the 53rd Academy Awards and three Grammy Award nominations including Song of the Year, winning her the awards for Best Country Song and Best Country Vocal Performance, Female at the 24th Annual Grammy Awards. Parton received an additional Best Album of Original Score Written for a Motion Picture or Television Special Grammy nomination for the 9 to 5 soundtrack alongside composer Charles Fox. For a time, it became something of an anthem for office workers in the US, and in 2004, it ranked at number 78 on the American Film Institute's 100 Years...100 Songs. The song was accompanied by a music video that featured footage of Parton and her band performing, intercut with scenes from the film.

== Background ==
The song was written for the comedy film 9 to 5, starring Jane Fonda, Lily Tomlin, and Dolly Parton in her film debut; both the song and the film owe their titles to 9to5, an organization founded in 1973 to bring about fair pay and equal treatment for women in the workplace. The song is also featured in a musical theater adaptation of the film, featuring a book by the film's original writer, Patricia Resnick, and 20 additional songs written by Dolly Parton. The musical began showing previews in Los Angeles on September 9, 2008, and played on Broadway at the Marquis Theatre from April until September 2009 before touring. In 2012, a UK theatre tour of 9 to 5 began.

A few months before Parton's song and the film, Scottish singer Sheena Easton released a single called "9 to 5" in the UK. When Easton's song was released in the U.S. the following year it was renamed "Morning Train (Nine to Five)" to avoid confusion. Easton's single topped the Billboard Hot 100 chart three months later. Despite similar titles, the two songs differ in lyrical themes. While Parton's song is about a working woman, Easton's song is about a woman waiting at home for her lover to return from work. Rolling Stone called "9 to 5" Parton's "most transformative song", ranking it at number 7 on its list of the 50 Best Dolly Parton songs.

== Commercial performance ==
"9 to 5" reached number one on the Billboard Country chart in January 1981. In February 1981, it went to number one on both the Billboard Hot 100 and the Adult Contemporary charts, respectively. It became Parton's first and only solo number one entry on the former (and her final top 40 hit on the pop charts), as Parton would later team up with Kenny Rogers on their number one duet "Islands in the Stream". The song was certified gold by the RIAA on February 19, 1981, indicating shipment of 1,000,000 physical copies. It was certified platinum on September 25, 2017. The song has accrued 500,000 digital downloads as of February 2019 in the United States after it was made available for download in the 21st century.

The song originally peaked at number 47 on the UK Singles Chart in 1981, but following Parton's death in 2026, it reached the UK Top 40 for the first time, reaching number 12. The following week, it climbed to number 5, reaching a new peak. It remains popular on radio and in nightclubs throughout the UK and was spliced between "Independent Women Part 1" by Destiny's Child and "Eple" by Röyksopp for the Soulwax album As Heard on Radio Soulwax Pt. 2. It had sold 303,511 digital copies in the UK as of July 2014. According to a report by the Official Charts Company in August 2026, "9 to 5" is Parton's most downloaded and streamed track in the UK, totaling 396,000 downloads and 239.4 million streams, respectively. It has amassed 2,433,372 total units in the UK since 1994, and is her biggest-selling song in the country. The track also topped the Canadian RPM Top Singles chart (2 weeks), #1 on the Canadian Country chart, and reached the top 10 in Austria, Belgium, Sweden, South Africa, Oceania, and the Netherlands.

== Legacy ==
"9 to 5" is one of the few Billboard chart songs to feature the clacking of a typewriter. Parton stated in numerous interviews that when she wrote the song, she devised the clacking typewriter rhythm by running her acrylic fingernails back and forth against one another. With this song, Parton became only the second woman to top both the U.S. country singles chart and the Billboard Hot 100 with the same single; the first was 1968's "Harper Valley PTA" by Jeannie C. Riley, which Parton had coincidentally covered on her 1969 album, In the Good Old Days (When Times Were Bad). "9 to 5" served as the theme song for the mid-1980s sitcom 9 to 5, which derived from the film. Phoebe Snow sang the theme for the four-episode premiere season, which aired in March and April 1982; however, Parton sang the theme for the sitcom's 1982–1983 run and for its 1986–1988 revival. Songwriters Neil and Jan Goldberg filed a lawsuit against Parton, claiming that "9 to 5" was a copy of their 1976 song "Money World". In December 1985 the court ruled in Parton's favor.

In 1985, the air freight company Emery Worldwide used the tune with advertising lyrics in some TV commercials. U.S. Senator Elizabeth Warren frequently used the song at campaign appearances during her 2020 presidential campaign, with it often playing when she took the stage. Reacting to the song's use, Parton's manager Danny Nozell said, "We did not approve the request, and we do not approve requests like this of (a) political nature." The song was sung from the public gallery of the New Zealand Parliament by supporters of Green Party MP Jan Logie at the conclusion of her valedictory address, and is thus recorded in Hansard. In early 2021, Parton recorded a new version of the song titled "5 to 9" for a Squarespace advert in the Super Bowl LV.

The song appeared in the opening scenes of the films The Love Guru performed by Mike Myers on the sitar as his character Guru Pitka and Deadpool 2 with Deadpool himself (Ryan Reynolds) using it in a sequence where he kills a series of people in his mercenary job, even starting the music by declaring "hit it, Dolly" immediately before. "9 to 5" was interpolated into the 2024 song "Powerful Women" by Pitbull, which features Parton re-recording the song's chorus alongside adding new lines. Pitbull later declared on X that it was "an honor to be collaborating with one of music's most powerful women".

The song was featured in "After Hours", the first episode of The Penguin. In June 2026, CBS News included the song in its list of the 250 essential American songs of the past 250 years. On August 25, 2026, following Parton's death, the Empire State Building in New York City lit up in a "pink sparkle" tribute at 9:25 p.m. EDT UTC–4 for "9 2 5" in her honor. On August 26, the Band of the Coldstream Guards played "9 to 5" during the Changing the Guard ceremony at Buckingham Palace. Meanwhile, Jessie Seal, a state senator in Tennessee, proposed making September 25 (9/25) a day to celebrate Parton’s accomplishments. The legislature will consider the measure when it convenes in January 2027.

== Personnel ==
- Dolly Parton – lead vocals, nails
- Jeff Baxter, Marty Walsh – guitars
- Abraham Laboriel – bass
- Larry Knechtel – piano
- Rick Shlosser – drums
- Leonard Castro – percussion
- William Reichenbach – trombone
- Tom Saviano – saxophone
- Kim S. Hutchroft – baritone saxophone
- Jerry Hey – trumpet
- Denise Mainelli DeCaro, Stephanie Spruill, Marty McCall, Joey Scarbury – background vocals

== Charts ==
=== Weekly charts ===
Weekly chart performance for "9 to 5"
Chart (1980–1981)	Peak position
Australia (Kent Music Report)	9
Austria (Ö3 Austria Top 40)	5
Belgium (Ultratop 50 Flanders)	5
Canada (CBC)	2
Canada (RPM)	1
Netherlands (Dutch Top 40)	10
Netherlands (Single Top 100)	15
New Zealand (Recorded Music NZ)	9
South Africa (Springbok Radio)	9
Spain (AFYVE)	18
Sweden (Sverigetopplistan)	6
UK Singles (Official Charts)	47
US Billboard Hot 100	1
US Adult Contemporary (Billboard)	1
US Hot Country Songs (Billboard)	1
West Germany (GfK)	46

Weekly chart performance for "9 to 5"
Chart (2026)	Peak position
Australia On Replay (ARIA)	1
Canada Hot 100 (Billboard)	24
Denmark (Tracklisten)	22
Global 200 (Billboard)	21
Ireland (IRMA)	8
Israel International Airplay (Media Forest)	1
New Zealand (Recorded Music NZ)	5
Norway (IFPI Norge)	47
Sweden (Sverigetopplistan)	17
Switzerland (Schweizer Hitparade)	34
UK Singles (Official Charts)	5

=== Year-end charts ===
Year-end chart performance for "9 to 5"
Chart (1981)	Position
Australia (Kent Music Report)	56
Belgium (Ultratop Flanders)	45
Canada Top Singles (RPM)	6
Netherlands (Dutch Top 40)	84
Netherlands (Single Top 100)	76
US Billboard Hot 100	9
US Adult Contemporary (Billboard)	9

== Certifications ==
Certifications for "9 to 5"
Region	Certification	Certified units/sales
Australia (ARIA)	7× Platinum	490,000^{‡}
Austria (IFPI Austria)	Platinum	100,000^{*}
Canada (Music Canada)	3× Platinum	240,000^{‡}
Denmark (IFPI Danmark)	Platinum	90,000^{‡}
Mexico (AMPROFON)	Gold	30,000^{‡}
New Zealand (RMNZ)	5× Platinum	150,000^{‡}
Norway (IFPI Norway)	3× Platinum	180,000^{‡}
United Kingdom (BPI)	4× Platinum	2,400,000^{‡}
United States (RIAA)	3× Platinum	3,000,000^{‡}
Streaming
Sweden (GLF)	3× Platinum	24,000,000^{†}
^{*} Sales figures based on certification alone.^{‡} Sales+streaming figures based on certification alone.^{†} Streaming-only figures based on certification alone.

== 2022 re-recording ==
"9 to 5 (From the Still Working 9-5 Documentary)"

Promotional single by Dolly Parton and Kelly Clarkson
- Released: September 9, 2022
- Recorded: 2021
- Genre: Pop
- Length: 3:44
- Label: Smack; Atlantic
- Songwriter: Dolly Parton
- Producers: Shane McAnally; Sasha Alex Sloan; King Henry

In 2021, Parton personally invited fellow American singer Kelly Clarkson to re-record "9 to 5" to promote the documentary film Still Working 9 to 5, which was produced by the Lane twins, Regina K. Scully, Geralyn Dreyfous and Shane McAnally to commemorate the 42nd anniversary of the original film and explore the challenges faced by women in the workplace. Their version, produced by McAnally with Sasha Alex Sloan and King Henry, was re-arranged to a midtempo pop ballad to fit in the atmosphere of the documentary. The track charted at number 15 on the Billboard Digital Song Sales chart. Parton and Clarkson later performed a live rendition of the song on Clarkson's eponymous variety talk show on December 1, 2022.

Weekly chart performance for "9 to 5 (From the Still Working 9-5 Documentary)"
Chart (2022)	Peak position
Canada Digital Song Sales (Billboard) Duet with Kelly Clarkson	46
US Digital Song Sales (Billboard) Duet with Kelly Clarkson	15
US Country Digital Song Sales (Billboard) Duet with Kelly Clarkson	6

== See also ==
- List of Billboard Hot 100 number ones of 1981
