= 9 to 5 (film) =

1980 American comedy film by Colin Higgins

- Theatrical release poster
- Directed by: Colin Higgins
- Screenplay by: Colin Higgins; Patricia Resnick
- Story by: Patricia Resnick
- Produced by: Bruce Gilbert
- Starring: Jane Fonda; Lily Tomlin; Dolly Parton; Dabney Coleman; Elizabeth Wilson; Sterling Hayden
- Cinematography: Reynaldo Villalobos
- Edited by: Pembroke J. Herring
- Music by: Charles Fox
- Production company: IPC Films
- Distributed by: 20th Century Fox
- Release date: December 19, 1980
- Running time: 110 minutes
- Country: United States
- Language: English
- Budget: $10 million
- Box office: $103.5 million

9 to 5 (also known as Nine to Five) is a 1980 American comedy film directed by Colin Higgins from a screenplay by Higgins and Patricia Resnick. It stars Jane Fonda, Lily Tomlin, Dolly Parton (in her film debut), Dabney Coleman, Elizabeth Wilson, and Sterling Hayden. In the film three female office employees band together to seek revenge against their sexist and autocratic male boss.

Development on 9 to 5 began after Fonda formed the production company IPC Films, inspired by 1940s-era films which featured multiple female leads. Patricia Resnick initially wrote the screenplay as a drama, but after discussions between Tomlin and Fonda, Higgins was hired and adapted the story from a drama to a comedy. Production paused during rewrites, during which time the rest of the main cast was rounded out. 9 to 5 would prove to be a star vehicle for Parton, who was a successful musician prior to acting in the film. Principal photography took place primarily in Los Angeles. The film's theme song, performed by Parton, was released in November 1980.

9 to 5 was first theatrically released in the United States on December 19, 1980, by 20th Century Fox. Upon release the film received mixed-to-positive reviews from critics, with praise for Parton's performance but criticism for its plot. Its theme song was nominated for an Academy Award and a Golden Globe, while Parton received two Golden Globe nominations, including for Best Actress. 9 to 5 has since received retrospective praise for its comedy and commentary on workplace sexism and women's labor. It grossed $103.3 million domestically and has also been adapted into both a television series and a musical. In April 2024 it was reported that a remake, produced by Jennifer Aniston, is in development.

== Plot ==
Housewife Judy Bernly starts work as a secretary at Consolidated Companies after her divorce and is placed under the supervision of sharp-tongued widow Violet Newstead. Both work under president Mr. Hinkle and egotistical, sexist vice president Franklin Hart.

When Hart turns down Violet for a promotion in favor of the less-qualified Bob Enright, Violet confronts him in his office when his secretary, Doralee Rhodes, follows Violet and subsequently learns about the rumor that she's having an affair with Hart. Discovering the rumor is a lie, both women hit a bar to drink away their frustration. Meanwhile, Hart fires Maria Delgado after learning from his loyal assistant, Roz, that Maria discussed her salary with a co-worker. Disgusted by Hart's cruelty, Judy joins Violet and Doralee at the bar.

They spend the evening smoking marijuana at Doralee's house and fantasizing about how they would get revenge on Hart: Judy would hunt him with a gun and mount his head on a wall, as he does to animals on his hunting trips; Doralee would turn the tables on sexual harassment, hogtie him rodeo style, then roast him over a fire; and Violet, in a fairytale-like sequence, would poison his coffee and throw him out the window. The next day, a distracted Violet accidentally puts rat poison in Hart's coffee, mistaking the box for the nearly identical box of sweetener. Before he can drink it, his desk chair malfunctions and he blacks out after hitting his head on a credenza.

Violet realizes her mistake and thinks the poisoned coffee caused Hart to black out. She and Judy meet Doralee at the hospital just in time to overhear a doctor pronounce a man dead from poisoning. Thinking the dead man is Hart, Violet steals the body to prevent an autopsy, but while arguing with Judy and Doralee, she crashes her car, damaging a fender. When Doralee retrieves a tire iron from the trunk to fix the fender, she discovers the body is not Hart so they return it to the hospital.

The next morning, Hart shocks the women when he arrives for work as usual. In the ladies’ room, Doralee explains that Hart hit his head but did not drink the coffee. Relieved that nothing will come out of the night's events, the ladies agree to meet for happy hour at the end of the day. However, Roz overhears their conversation and reports back to Hart.

Hart summons Doralee to his office and offers her a choice: if she spends the night with him, he will not report her, Judy, and Violet for attempted murder. Doralee refuses, and when Hart will not hear her out, she hogties him and stuffs a scarf in his mouth to keep him quiet. He tricks Judy into loosening the binds, which leads her to shoot at him with Doralee's handgun, nearly committing murder.

The women discover that Hart has been selling Consolidated inventory and pocketing the proceeds, so they decide to blackmail him into keeping quiet. When they are told that invoices Violet ordered to prove the crimes will not arrive for 4 to 6 weeks, they kidnap Hart and hold him prisoner in his bedroom.

While Hart is out of the office, Doralee forges his signature and in his name, they implement several programs that are popular with the workers, including an in-office daycare center, equal pay for everyone, flexible hours, and a job-sharing program allowing employees to work part-time.

Days before the invoices arrive, Hart's wife Missy returns from a cruise and frees him, giving him the time to buy back the inventory he sold. Before Hart can report Judy, Doralee, and Violet to the police, the chairman of the board Russell Tinsworthy arrives and congratulates Hart on his improvements to the office, which have resulted in a 20 percent increase in productivity. Tinsworthy invites Hart to join him on a multiyear project in Brazil, which he reluctantly accepts.

A postscript states that Violet is promoted to vice president. Judy marries the Xerox representative. Doralee leaves Consolidated to become a country & western singer. Hart is abducted by a tribe of Amazons in the Brazilian jungle and is "never heard from again".

== Cast ==
- Jane Fonda as Judy Bernly, a new employee for whom Consolidated is her first job after being a housewife. She is forced to get a job after her husband leaves her for his young secretary, with whom he cheated on Judy. Soon after starting work, she befriends Violet and Doralee.
- Lily Tomlin as Violet Newstead, a widow with four kids who has been working at Consolidated for twelve years. Despite being very knowledgeable about the company and having once trained him, Hart treats her like a secretary and gives a promotion she wanted to a man. She is the most senior supervisor on her floor and becomes responsible for training Judy, whom she eventually befriends.
- Dolly Parton as Doralee Rhodes, Frank Hart's attractive, married secretary whom he consistently flirts with and sexually harasses. He also gives her presents he tells Violet are for his wife, and spreads an untrue rumor that he and Doralee are having an affair, resulting in the staff shunning her.
- Dabney Coleman as Franklin M. Hart Jr., a Vice President of Consolidated Companies who is the boss of Judy, Violet, Roz, and Doralee. Despite being married, he is not shy about flirting or sexually harassing other women, especially Doralee, and refers to the secretaries on his floor as his "girls". He also steals an idea from Violet and tries to embezzle from Consolidated.
- Sterling Hayden as Russell Tinsworthy, Consolidated Companies' chairman of the board who is mostly away working on a jungle clearance project in Brazil.
- Elizabeth Wilson as Roz, Hart's sycophantic, loyal administrative personal assistant who constantly eavesdrops on the other staff and reports what she learns to Hart.
- Henry Jones as Mr. Hinkle, the President of Consolidated Companies who Hart works under and answers to Tinsworthy.
- Lawrence Pressman as Dick, Judy's ex-husband.
- Marian Mercer as Missy Hart, Franklin's sweet-natured wife who adores him and is oblivious to his cheating.
- Renn Woods as Barbara, one of Judy and Violet's co-workers
- Norma Donaldson as Betty, another co-worker
- Roxanna Bonilla-Giannini as Maria Delgado, a friendly co-worker that has children who Judy befriends. Roz reports to Hart on derisive comments on salary that she heard her make in the ladies' room which results in Hart having Roz inform Maria that she is fired. She later returns to work part-time under the women's job-sharing program that impresses Tinsworthy.
- Jeffrey Douglas Thomas as Dwayne Rhodes, Doralee's husband.
- Peggy Pope as Margaret Foster, an alcoholic secretary whom others refer to as "the old lush".
- Richard Stahl as Meade
- Ray Vitte as Eddie, a friend of Violet's who works in the company mail room, but aspires to become an executive.
- Earl Boen as Perkins

== Production ==
The film was based on an idea by Jane Fonda, who had recently formed her own production company IPC Films:

My ideas for films always come from things that I hear and perceive in my daily life ... A very old friend of mine had started an organization in Boston called "Nine to Five", which was an association of women office workers. I heard them talking about their work and they had some great stories. And I've always been attracted to those 1940s films with three female stars.

Fonda said the film was at first going to be a drama, but "any way we did it, it seemed too preachy, too much of a feminist line. I'd wanted to work with Lily [Tomlin] for some time, and it suddenly occurred to [her producing partner] Bruce and me that we should make it a comedy." Patricia Resnick wrote the first draft drama, and Fonda cast herself, Lily Tomlin, and Dolly Parton in the leads, Parton in her first film role.

Colin Higgins then came on board to direct and rewrite the script; part of his job was to make room for all three in the script. Higgins said Fonda was a very encouraging producer, who allowed him to push back production while the script was being rewritten. "He's a very nice, quiet, low-key guy", said Parton of Higgins. "I don't know what I would have done if I'd had one of those mean directors on my first film." Higgins admitted that he "expected some tension" from working with three stars, "but they were totally professional, great fun, and a joy to work with. I just wish everything would be as easy."

Fonda stated that the resulting film "remains a 'labour film'", but that she hoped it to be "of a new kind, different from the Grapes of Wrath or Salt of the Earth". "We took out a lot of stuff that was filmed, even stuff the director, Colin Higgins, thought worked but which I asked to have taken out. I'm just super-sensitive to anything that smacks of the soapbox or lecturing the audience".

Fonda said she did a lot of research, focusing on women who had begun work late in life due to divorce or being widowed.

What I found was that secretaries know the work they do is important, is skilled, but they also know they're not treated with respect. They call themselves "office wives". They have to put gas in the boss's car, get his coffee, buy the presents for his wife and mistress. So when we came to do the film, we said to Colin [Higgins], OK, what you have to do is write a screenplay which shows you can run an office without a boss, but you can't run an office without the secretaries!

=== Filming locations ===
The home of Franklin Hart is located at 10431 Bellagio Road in Bel Air, Los Angeles. According to commentary included in the DVD release of the film, the home was, at the time, owned by the Chandler family, publishers of the Los Angeles Times. The Consolidated offices were presumably in the Pacific Financial Center located at 800 W 6th Street, at South Flower Street in Los Angeles. Although the story appears to be set in Los Angeles, the opening credit montage, set to the title song, is mostly composed of shots from downtown San Francisco. These shots include an electric Muni bus fitted with a KFOG 104.5 FM advertisement, the Ferry Building clock, and a brief glimpse of the San Francisco twins, Marian and Vivian Brown.

== Soundtrack ==
=== Theme song ===
The film's theme song, "9 to 5", written and recorded by Parton, became one of her biggest hits of the decade. While filming the 9 to 5 movie, Parton found she could use her long acrylic fingernails to simulate the sound of a typewriter. She wrote the song on set by clicking her nails together and forming the beat. The song went to number one for two weeks on the Billboard Hot 100, as well as the U.S. country singles charts, and was nominated for several awards, including the Academy Award for Best Original Song. It won the 1981 People's Choice Award for "Favorite Motion Picture Song", and two 1982 Grammy Awards: for "Country Song of the Year" and "Female Country Vocal of the Year" (it was nominated for four Grammys). Additionally, it was certified platinum by the RIAA.

== Reception ==
Roger Ebert gave the film 3 stars out of 4 and called it "pleasant entertainment, and I liked it, despite its uneven qualities and a plot that's almost too preposterous for the material." Ebert singled out Dolly Parton as "a natural-born movie star" who "contains so much energy, so much life and unstudied natural exuberance that watching her do anything in this movie is a pleasure." Vincent Canby of The New York Times was less enthusiastic, writing, "It's clearly a movie that began as someone's bright idea, which then went into production before anyone had time to give it a well-defined personality."

Gene Siskel of the Chicago Tribune gave the film 2.5 stars out of 4 and wrote, "The most pleasant surprise is the appearance of Dolly Parton, who with this one film establishes herself as a thoroughly engaging movie star. The biggest disappointment is that this Jane Fonda comedy about a trio of secretaries out to get their boss doesn't have more bite ... Instead of getting darker and darker, 'Nine to Five' gets lighter and lighter until it loses most of the energy it established so well early on." Variety stated, "Although it can probably be argued that Patricia Resnick and director Colin Higgins' script at times borders on the inane, the bottom line is that this picture is a lot of fun." Kevin Thomas of the Los Angeles Times wrote that the film "appears to be an audience pleaser that never misses an intended laugh. However, it strays so far from reality for so long that it threatens to become mired in overly complicated silliness and to lose sight of the serious satirical points it wants to make. Happily, it does pull together for a finish that's as strong as it is funny."

Gary Arnold of The Washington Post thought the film "runs a merely weak comic premise into the ground with coarse, laborious execution". He thought that Dolly Parton was the film's "only reassuring aspect", as she seemed "an instantly likable natural on the movie screen, too". David Ansen of Newsweek called the film "a disappointment ... It's not wild or dark enough to qualify as a truly disturbing farce and it's too fanciful and silly to succeed as realistic satire. Politically and esthetically, it's harmless—a mildly amusing romp that tends to get swallowed up by its own overly intricate plot."

Ronald Reagan wrote in his presidential diary that he and his wife Nancy watched the film on Valentine's Day 1981. He wrote, "Funny—but one scene made me mad. A truly funny scene if the 3 gals had played getting drunk but no they had to get stoned on pot. It was an endorsement of Pot smoking for any young person who sees the picture."

While the film received mixed reviews from critics during its initial theatrical release, it has since been reappraised for its commentary on workplace sexism and the gender pay gap. In a 2018 review for The Guardian, Peter Bradshaw wrote, "Thirty-eight years on, this tale of misogyny, kidnap and rattling typewriters is a boldly progressive piece of film-making." The film's cultural legacy, path to production, and impact on the women's labor movement are explored in the 2022 documentary Still Working 9 to 5.

The film holds a score of 71% on Rotten Tomatoes based on 103 reviews. The critical consensus reads: "It might not be much of a way to make a living, but 9 to 5 is a wonderfully cast comedy that makes some sharp points about gender roles in the workplace." Metacritic gave the film a score of 58 based on 12 reviews, indicating "mixed or average" reviews.

=== Accolades ===
Award	Category	Nominee(s)	Result	Ref.
Academy Awards	Best Original Song	"9 to 5"; Music and Lyrics by Dolly Parton	Nominated	
Academy of Country Music Awards	Country Movie of the Year	Bruce Gilbert	Nominated	
Golden Globe Awards	Best Actress in a Motion Picture – Musical or Comedy	Dolly Parton	Nominated	
Golden Globe Awards	New Star of the Year in a Motion Picture – Female	Dolly Parton	Nominated	
Golden Globe Awards	Best Original Song – Motion Picture	"9 to 5"; Music and Lyrics by Dolly Parton	Nominated	
Grammy Awards	Song of the Year	"9 to 5" – Dolly Parton	Nominated	
Grammy Awards	Best Country Vocal Performance, Female	"9 to 5" – Dolly Parton	Won	
Grammy Awards	Best Country Song	"9 to 5" – Dolly Parton	Won	
Grammy Awards	Best Album of Original Score Written for a Motion Picture or a Television Special	9 to 5 – Charles Fox and Dolly Parton	Nominated	
Online Film & Television Association Awards	Film Hall of Fame: Songs	"9 to 5"	Inducted	
People's Choice Awards	Favorite Song from a Motion Picture	"9 to 5"	Won	
Writers Guild of America Awards	Best Comedy – Written Directly for the Screenplay	Colin Higgins and Patricia Resnick	Nominated	

The film is recognized by American Film Institute in these lists:

- 2000: AFI's 100 Years...100 Laughs – No. 74
- 2004: AFI's 100 Years...100 Songs:
  - "9 to 5" – No. 78

== Legacy ==
=== Television series ===
The film inspired a sitcom, which aired from 1982 to 1983 and from 1986 to 1988, on ABC (1982–83) and in first-run syndication (1986–88). It featured Parton's younger sister, Rachel Dennison, in Parton's role; with Rita Moreno and Valerie Curtin, respectively, taking over Tomlin's and Fonda's roles. In the syndicated era, Sally Struthers replaced Moreno. A total of 85 episodes were filmed.

=== Stage adaptation ===
In an interview aired on September 30, 2005, on Larry King Live, Parton revealed that she was writing the songs for a musical stage adaptation of the film. A private reading of the musical took place on January 19, 2007. Further private presentations were held in New York City in summer 2007.

In early March 2008, Center Theatre Group artistic director Michael Ritchie announced that 9 to 5 would have its pre-Broadway run at the center's Ahmanson Theatre in Los Angeles beginning September 21, 2008, with Allison Janney starring as Violet, joined by Stephanie J. Block as Judy, Megan Hilty as Doralee, and Marc Kudisch as Franklin Hart Jr. The libretto was written by Patricia Resnick, who co-authored the film. Andy Blankenbuehler choreographed the show, and Joe Mantello directed.

According to Playbill, the musical opened on Broadway at the Marquis Theatre in previews on April 7, 2009, and officially on April 30, 2009. However, due to low ticket sales and gross, the production closed on September 6, 2009. A national tour began in September 2010.

=== Possible sequel ===
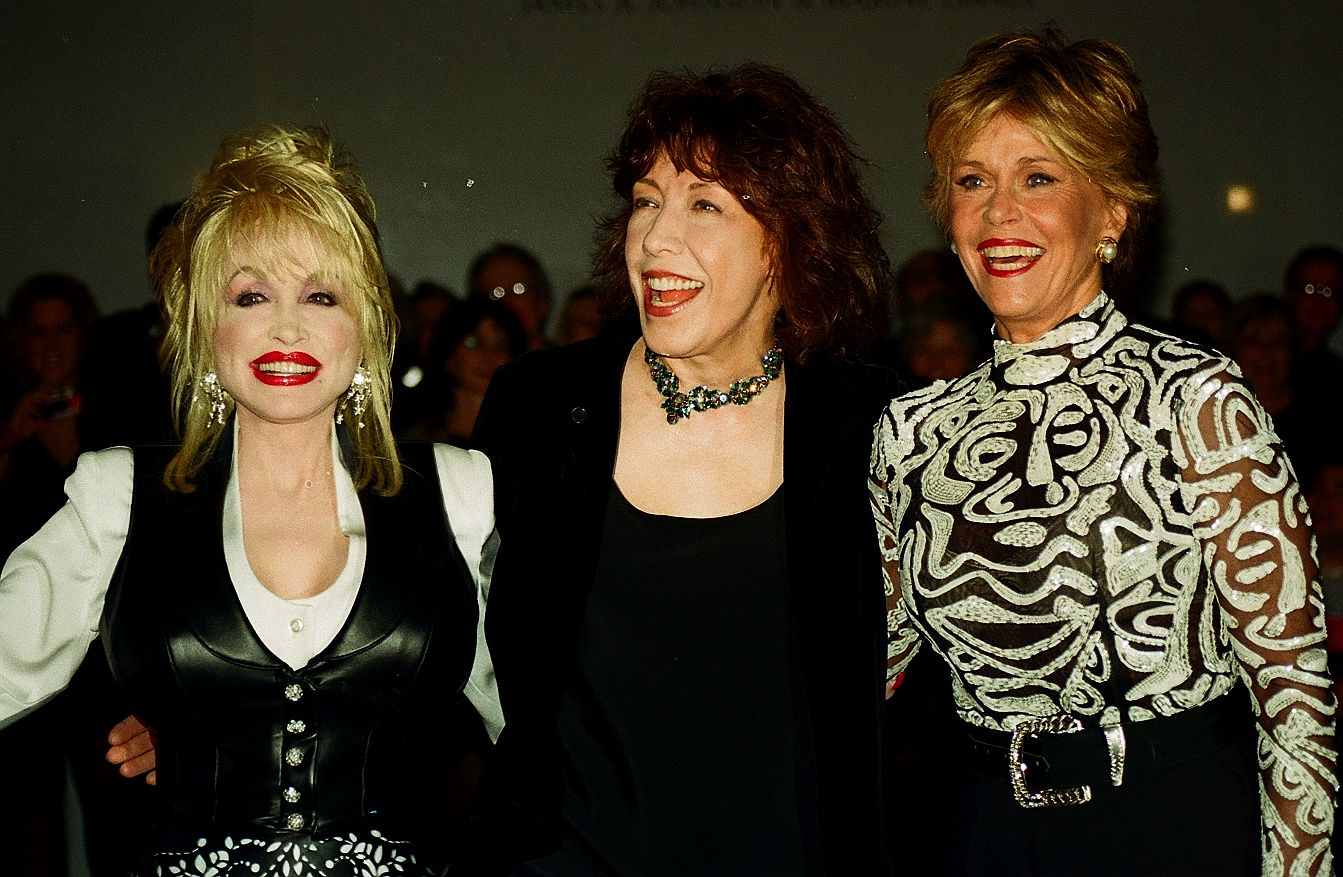
Parton, Tomlin, and Fonda in 2000

In the 1980s, Universal developed a sequel with Higgins. Tom Mankiewicz worked on it for a while and says that while Parton was enthusiastic, Fonda was not and Higgins' heart was not in it.

In a 2005 BBC One interview broadcast, Fonda, Tomlin, and Parton all expressed interest in a sequel. Fonda said if the right script was written she would definitely do it, suggesting a suitable name for a 21st-century sequel would be 24/7. Parton suggested they had better hurry up before they reach retirement age. In the DVD commentary, the three reiterate their enthusiasm; Fonda suggests a sequel should cover outsourcing and they agree Hart would have to return as their nemesis.

In 2018, Parton announced that a sequel was in the works to bring the story into a modern-day setting. In July 2018, Jane Fonda also confirmed that a sequel was in the works with herself, Tomlin and Parton returning to their roles as mentors to a new generation of women. Fonda revealed that she is also an executive producer on the project. Rashida Jones and Pat Resnick have been attached to write a script. On October 23, 2018, Fonda reiterated news about the development of a sequel on GMA Day. On October 30, 2019, Parton announced the sequel had been dropped.

In 2022, though, all three actresses made a full reunion of the 9 to 5 cast, after Parton appeared in a guest-starring role in the final episode of the Netflix comedy streaming TV series Grace and Frankie, which starred Fonda and Tomlin for seven seasons.

=== Remake ===
In April 2024, Variety revealed that Jennifer Aniston and her Echo Films partner Kristin Hahn are producing a 9 to 5 reimagining for 20th Century Studios. In January 2025, it was reported that Aniston was considering casting Ariana Grande, Sydney Sweeney and Zendaya in the lead roles.

=== Turkish adaptation ===
There is an adaptation film titled Patron Duymasın (Don't Let the Boss Find Out), which was made in Turkey in 1985. Except for the fact that the two main oppressed characters are both men (the boss is also male), the script is almost identical. It has been performed by famous actors in Turkey and is occasionally broadcast on television.

== Home media ==
In 1981, the film was released on VHS and LaserDisc by Magnetic Video Corporation. It would be rereleased by its successor, CBS/Fox Video (a joint venture between CBS and 20th Century Fox) later that decade. The CBS/Fox Video release covered several countries, including the United States, the United Kingdom, Germany, the Netherlands, Japan and Australia. 20th Century Fox Home Entertainment later released the film on DVD in the United States on April 17, 2001. In Australia, it was released on DVD in 2003 by 20th Century Fox Home Entertainment South Pacific, while in the United Kingdom it was released on DVD on March 6, 2006. During the 2000s, the film was in rotation on the Fox Movie Channel, a channel dedicated to 20th Century Fox Films.

On March 20, 2019, Rupert Murdoch sold most of 21st Century Fox's film and television assets to The Walt Disney Company, and 9 to 5 was one of the films included in the deal. 9 to 5 was made available on Disney's streaming service Disney+, which launched in 2019.

== See also ==
- Horrible Bosses

== Bibliography ==
- Ellen Cassedy; Jane Fonda (2022). Working 9 to 5: A Women's Movement, a Labor Union, and the Iconic Movie. Chicago Review Press. ISBN 9781641608220.
