= Patricia Resnick =

American screenwriter

- Born: February 9, 1953 (age 73); Miami, Florida, USA
- Education: University of Southern California
- Occupations: Screenwriter, TV writer, producer

Patricia Resnick (born February 9, 1953) is an American screenwriter and producer, known for her work on films like 9 to 5, Straight Talk, and Maxie. She has also worked as a consulting producer or co-producer on TV series like Mad Men and Better Things.

== Biography ==
Resnick met Robert Altman while studying at the University of Southern California and started her career working with him on the film 3 Women. She collaborated several times with Altman, beginning with developing 3 Women. She later appeared as herself in one of his films, The Player. One of her biggest successes came in 9 to 5: Resnick wrote the first draft drama, and Jane Fonda cast herself, Lily Tomlin, and Dolly Parton in the leads, the last in her first film role.

Resnick served as a writer on a number of television series, and as a supervising producer on the final season of Mad Men.

== Selected filmography (as writer) ==
=== Film ===
- Straight Talk (1992)
- Second Sight (1989)
- Maxie (1985)
- 9 to 5 (1980)
- Quintet (1979)
- A Wedding (1978)
- 3 Women (1977) (uncredited)

=== TV ===
- Better Things (2020) (series) (1 episode)
- Tales of the City (2019) (series) (1 episode)
- The Arrangement (2017) (series) (2 episodes)
- Recovery Road (2016) (series) (3 episodes)
- Perfect Match (2015) (TV movie)
- Midnight Masquerade (2015) (TV movie)
- Olivia (2009) (series) (15 episodes)
- The Battle of Mary Kay (2002) (TV movie)
- Jenifer (2001) (TV movie)
- Sex, Lies & Obsession (2001) (TV movie)
- The Expendables (2000) (TV movie)
- Price of a Broken Heart (1999) (TV movie)
- Faerie Tale Theatre (1982 Hansel And Gretel
- Cher… and Other Fantasies (1979) (TV movie)
- Visions (1979) (series) (1 episode)
- Cher… (1978) (TV special)
