= Blue Smoke (album) =

Studio album by Dolly Parton
- Released: January 31, 2014
- Recorded: 2013
- Studios: Ben's Studio (Nashville, Tennessee); Blackbird (Nashville, Tennessee); Kent Wells Production (Nashville, Tennessee); Sound Emporium (Nashville, Tennessee); Sound Kitchen (Franklin); Starstruck (Nashville, Tennessee)
- Genre: Country
- Length: 46:43
- Labels: Dolly Records, Sony Masterworks

Dolly Parton chronology
| Joyful Noise (2012) | Blue Smoke (2014) | Just Between You and Me: The Complete Recordings, 1967–1976 (2014) |

Singles from Blue Smoke
- 1. "Blue Smoke" Released: December 10, 2013; 2. "Home" Released: April 22, 2014; 3. "Try" Released: July 7, 2014; 4. "Unlikely Angel" Released: February 16, 2015

Blue Smoke is the forty-fourth solo studio album by American country entertainer Dolly Parton. The album was released in Australia and New Zealand on January 31, 2014, in North America on May 13, 2014, in Ireland on June 6, 2014, and in Europe on June 9, 2014. It includes duets with Kenny Rogers and Willie Nelson, and covers of songs by Bob Dylan and Bon Jovi.

== Background ==
Parton mentioned working on a new album in July 2013. In December 2013, Parton announced that the album would be released through a partnership between Parton's Dolly Records and Sony Masterworks.

The name, Blue Smoke, was inspired by the mist that covers the Great Smoky Mountains of East Tennessee. The album features a duet with Kenny Rogers on "You Can't Make Old Friends", which was originally released on his 2013 album of the same name. The song debuted on the Billboard Country Airplay chart in December 2013 and reached a peak of number 57, becoming Parton's first chart entry since "Jesus and Gravity" peaked at number 56 in 2008. The album also includes a new recording of "From Here to the Moon and Back" with Willie Nelson, which was also on Nelson's 2013 album, To All the Girls.... Parton previously recorded and performed the song with Kris Kristofferson in Joyful Noise, and it was featured on the movie's soundtrack release. Blue Smoke also includes covers of Bob Dylan's "Don't Think Twice, It's All Right" and Bon Jovi's "Lay Your Hands on Me".

In the UK, a special version of the album, titled Blue Smoke – The Best Of, was released on June 9, 2014, in conjunction with the European leg of the Blue Smoke World Tour. It features the standard album, plus a bonus disc with 20 of Parton's greatest hits, most of which feature in the tour set list.

=== Previous recordings ===
Three songs featured on the album had previously been recorded by Parton.

- "Unlikely Angel" was originally written and recorded for the 1996 film of the same name. The version featured in the film was never commercially released.
- "From Here to the Moon and Back" was previously recorded by Parton, Jeremy Jordan and Kris Kristofferson for the 2012 film Joyful Noise and was released on the film's soundtrack album.
- "Early Morning Breeze" was originally recorded by Parton for her 1971 album Coat of Many Colors and again for her 1974 album Jolene.

== Promotion ==
The Blue Smoke World Tour was officially announced on The Queen Latifah Show on October 21, 2013, where she performed a song from the album, "Miss You, Miss Me". In December 2013, Parton discussed the album and tour on Access Hollywood. The tour will serve as the main promotional vehicle behind the album. On April 14, 2014, Parton appeared on AXS TV's The Big Interview to discuss the album, tour, and other aspects of her career with Dan Rather. Parton also signed on to become one of the headlining acts of the Glastonbury Festival to promote the album in the United Kingdom in June 2014. On April 27, 2014, Parton performed on QVC's Q Sessions Live, where she performed several songs from the album along with past hits. Also on April 27, the entire album became available to stream for free on National Public Radio. Yahoo! Music hosted a series of videos of Parton discussing her album, life, and career leading up to the album's release. Parton appeared on Today on the album's release date where she performed in the show's Toyota Concert Series. Parton also promoted the album by offering fans a free digital copy of Blue Smoke if they pre-ordered the album from Walmart.

The title track was released as a single ahead of the album release in Australia and New Zealand in December 2013. On March 18, 2014, the single was released elsewhere via iTunes. It was also available for immediate download with pre-order of the album. The second single is "Home" and Parton filmed a video in Tennessee for the song. "Home" was written by Parton and Kent Wells, and was released as a single with a music video on May 28, 2014. Lyrically, the song tells the story of a girl who left her home at age 17 to follow her dreams and is now returning after many years, which she describes fondly. The song is considered to be autobiographical of Parton.

== Critical reception ==
Professional ratings
Aggregate scores
| Source | Rating |
|---|---|
| Metacritic | 81/100 |
Review scores
| Source | Rating |
| AllMusic | 3.5/5 stars |
| American Songwriter | 4/5 stars |
| The A.V. Club | B+ |
| CCM Magazine | 4/5 stars |
| Country Weekly | A− |
| Exclaim! | 7/10 |
| Mojo | 4/5 stars |
| Paste | 8.3/10 |
| Slant Magazine | 3.5/5 stars |
| Tom Hull | B+ |

Blue Smoke received general acclaim from contemporary music critics. At Metacritic, they assign a rating out of 100 to selected independent reviews from mainstream critics, the album has an average score of 81, based on 8 reviews, which indicates "universal acclaim". At Country Weekly, Jon Freeman graded the album an A−, stating that "On Blue Smoke, the country legend travels many different paths and sounds only like herself." Stephen Thomas Erlewine of AllMusic rated the album three-and-a-half stars out of five, writing that "Perhaps there are no permanent additions to her canon here, but the remarkable thing is how satisfying an album this is: it sounds good and the songs are sturdy, proof that Parton is far from resting on her laurels." At Paste, Holly Gleason rated the album an 8.3 out of ten, saying that the artist "Finding a strong balance between art and slick, Parton continues walking a line of what people expect and her heart. She just gets better with age." Marah Eakin of The A.V. Club graded the album a B+, stating that the release shows how Parton "handily harnesses those charms [...] coupled with that stellar musicality, of course [...] to produce an absolutely lovely LP."

At The Boston Globe, James Reed gave a positive review of the album, writing that "even when Parton goes camp and piles on the gloss, there's still a big heart beating beneath the album's surface, much like the artist herself." At American Songwriter, Eric Allen rated the album four stars out of five, stating that "Blue Smoke easily hits its mark of making us look within ourselves while laughing through our tears." Joe Sweeney of Slant Magazine rated the album three-and-a-half stars out of five, saying that in "the vividness and genuine conviction in that timeless, still-powerful voice finds the humanity in all of it", and in so doing "the country legend mainlines one greeting-card sentiment after another, singing about angels, rainbows, moons, and fishing holes with reckless abandon." At Exclaim!, Thierry Côté rated the album a seven out of ten, writing that "It is an album of small pleasures, an eclectic collection of songs that showcases many of the qualities that have made the Tennessee singer such a vital force in country music for five decades." Andy Argyrakis of CCM Magazine rated the album four stars out of five, commenting how "Parton's cheer, humor and candor continue on this stripped-down, catchy collection" that "continues her popularity resurgence with another rootsy record consisting of many personally penned tunes."

== Commercial performance ==
In the US, Blue Smoke debuted at number 6 with first-week sales of 37,000 copies. It was Parton's highest-charting, and first top 10, solo album ever. Its first week sales were her best sales week for a solo project. Blue Smoke also logged her best debut rank on Top Country Albums in 23 years, entering at No. 2.

In the UK, Blue Smoke proved to be Parton's most successful album ever, spending 12 weeks in the top 10 UK Albums Chart, with a peak position of number 2 in the seventh week. It was certified Silver by the British Phonographic Industry (BPI) on July 4, 2014, Gold on July 18, 2014, and Platinum on December 12, 2014. The album has sold over 437,351 copies in the UK as of August 2026.

== Track listing ==
All tracks are written by Dolly Parton, except where noted.

Blue Smoke track listing
| No. | Title | Writer(s) | Length |
|---|---|---|---|
| 1. | "Blue Smoke" | | 3:33 |
| 2. | "Unlikely Angel" | | 3:23 |
| 3. | "Don't Think Twice" | Bob Dylan | 3:21 |
| 4. | "You Can't Make Old Friends" (duet with Kenny Rogers) | Ryan Hanna King; Don Schlitz; Caitlyn Smith | 3:57 |
| 5. | "Home" | Parton; Kent Wells | 3:22 |
| 6. | "Banks of the Ohio" | Traditional; additional lyrics by Parton | 3:48 |
| 7. | "Lay Your Hands on Me" | Jon Bon Jovi; Richie Sambora | 4:13 |
| 8. | "Miss You–Miss Me" | | 4:00 |
| 9. | "If I Had Wings" | | 4:06 |
| 10. | "Lover du Jour" | | 4:11 |
| 11. | "From Here to the Moon and Back" (duet with Willie Nelson) | | 4:02 |
| 12. | "Try" | | 4:47 |
| Total length: | | | 46:43 |

Walmart edition bonus tracks
| No. | Title | Length |
|---|---|---|
| 13. | "Get Up, Get Out, Get On" | 2:55 |
| 14. | "Olive Branch" | 3:09 |
| 15. | "Early Morning Breeze" | 2:57 |
| 16. | "Angels in the Midst" | 3:12 |
| Total length: | | 58:56 |

UK edition bonus disc – Blue Smoke: The Best of Dolly Parton
| No. | Title | Writer(s) | Length |
|---|---|---|---|
| 1. | "I Will Always Love You" | | 3:07 |
| 2. | "9 to 5" | | 3:01 |
| 3. | "Jolene" | | 2:42 |
| 4. | "Together You and I" | | 3:59 |
| 5. | "Islands in the Stream" (duet with Kenny Rogers) | Barry Gibb; Robin Gibb; Maurice Gibb | 4:11 |
| 6. | "Here You Come Again" | Barry Mann; Cynthia Weil | 2:55 |
| 7. | "Coat of Many Colors" | | 3:05 |
| 8. | "Little Sparrow" | | 4:14 |
| 9. | "Love Is Like a Butterfly" | | 2:22 |
| 10. | "My Tennessee Mountain Home" | | 3:09 |
| 11. | "In the Ghetto" | Mac Davis | 2:49 |
| 12. | "Silver Threads and Golden Needles" (with Tammy Wynette and Loretta Lynn) | Jack Rhodes; Dick Reynolds | 2:25 |
| 13. | "Sacred Memories" | | 2:44 |
| 14. | "Applejack" | | 3:27 |
| 15. | "Two Doors Down" | | 3:06 |
| 16. | "Baby I'm Burning" | | 2:38 |
| 17. | "Better Get to Livin'" | Parton; Wells | 3:36 |
| 18. | "The Sacrifice" | | 3:28 |
| 19. | "From Here to the Moon and Back" (with Kris Kristofferson and Jeremy Jordan) | | 4:26 |
| 20. | "Better Day" | | 3:19 |

QVC edition bonus CD – Dolly Parton Live
| No. | Title | Writer(s) | Length |
|---|---|---|---|
| 1. | "Two Doors Down" (Live from London) | | 4:16 |
| 2. | "Jolene" (Live from London) | | 3:00 |
| 3. | "Here You Come Again" (Live from London) | Mann; Weil | 2:58 |
| 4. | "9 to 5" (Live from London) | | 3:15 |
| 5. | "I Will Always Love You" (Live from London) | | 4:32 |

- The 4 Walmart Edition bonus tracks were made available on Digital and streaming as bonus tracks on her previous studio album Better Day.

== Personnel ==
- Monty Allen – background vocals
- Rebecca Isaacs Bowman – background vocals
- Mike Brignardello – bass guitar
- Jim "Moose" Brown – piano
- Pat Buchanan – electric guitar, harmonica
- Nick Buda – drums, percussion
- J.T. Corenflos – electric guitar
- Chad Cromwell – drums
- Dennis Crouch – upright bass
- Eric Darken – percussion
- Christian Davis – background vocals
- Michael Davis – keyboards
- Richard Dennison – piano, background vocals
- Stuart Duncan – fiddle
- Terry Eldridge – background vocals
- Paul Franklin – steel guitar
- Steve Gibson – electric guitar
- Vicki Hampton – background vocals
- Aubrey Haynie – fiddle, mandolin
- Steve Hinson – lap steel guitar
- Jim Hoke – harmonica
- Paul Hollowell – Hammond B-3 organ, keyboards, piano
- Dann Huff – electric guitar
- Sonya Isaacs – background vocals
- Carl Jackson – background vocals
- Jamie Johnson – background vocals
- Charlie Judge – piano, synthesizer strings, synthesizer
- Randy Kohrs – dobro
- Steve Mackey – bass guitar
- Bob Mater – drums
- Jimmy Mattingly – fiddle, mandolin
- John Mock – harmonium
- Greg Morrow – drums
- The Nashville String Machine – strings
- Willie Nelson – duet vocals on "From Here to the Moon and Back"
- Jennifer O'Brien – background vocals
- Dolly Parton – lead vocals
- Mickey Raphael – harmonica
- Danny Roberts – mandolin
- Kenny Rogers – duet vocals on "You Can't Make Old Friends"
- Tom Rutledge – acoustic guitar
- Jimmie Lee Sloas – bass guitar
- Val Story – background vocals
- Bryan Sutton – acoustic guitar
- Bobby Terry – acoustic guitar
- Ilya Toshinsky – acoustic guitar
- Steve Turner – drums, percussion
- Scott Vestal – banjo
- Jay Weaver – upright bass
- Derek Wells – electric guitar
- Kent Wells – drum programming, acoustic guitar, electric guitar
- Tommy White – steel guitar
- Bobby Wood – synthesizer

== Charts ==
=== Weekly charts ===
| Chart (2014) | Peak position |
|---|---|
| Australian Albums (ARIA) | 7 |
| Australian Country Albums (ARIA) | 1 |
| Danish Albums (Hitlisten) | 13 |
| Irish Albums (IRMA) | 21 |
| New Zealand Albums (RMNZ) | 1 |
| Scottish Albums (Official Charts) | 2 |
| Swedish Albums (Sverigetopplistan) | 43 |
| UK Albums (Official Charts) | 2 |
| UK Country Albums (Official Charts) | 4 |
| UK Country Compilation Albums (OCC) | 1 |
| US Billboard 200 | 6 |
| US Top Country Albums (Billboard) | 2 |
| German Albums (Offizielle Top 100) | 34 |

=== Year-end charts ===
| Chart (2014) | Position |
|---|---|
| UK Albums (OCC) | 13 |
| US Top Country Albums (Billboard) | 60 |

== Certifications and sales ==
| Region | Certification | Certified units/sales |
|---|---|---|
| United Kingdom (BPI) | Platinum | 437,351 |
| United States | — | 88,000 |

== Release history ==
| Country | Date | Format | Label |
|---|---|---|---|
| Australia | January 31, 2014 | CD, digital download | Dolly Records/Sony Masterworks |
| New Zealand | January 31, 2014 | CD, digital download | Dolly Records/Sony Masterworks |
| North America | May 13, 2014 | CD, LP, digital download | Dolly Records/Sony Masterworks |
| Republic of Ireland | June 6, 2014 | CD, digital download | Dolly Records/Sony Masterworks |
| Europe | June 9, 2014 | CD, LP, digital download | Dolly Records/Sony Masterworks |
