= Dolly Parton (Warhol) =

1985 painting by Andy Warhol

- Artist: Andy Warhol
- Year: 1985
- Medium: Acrylic and silkscreen ink on canvas
- Movement: Pop Art
- Subject: Dolly Parton
- Dimensions: 106.7 cm × 106.7 cm (42.0 in × 42.0 in)

Dolly Parton is a silkscreen painting by American artist Andy Warhol, created in 1985. It depicts singer-songwriter and actress Dolly Parton. Warhol and Parton had been acquainted since the late 1970s. In 1985, Parton commissioned the portrait for her manager, Sandy Gallin. Warhol used Polaroid photographs he took of Parton as the basis for the portraits. Gallin ultimately was not satisfied with the completed portraits and refused to pay for the commission. Several Dolly Parton paintings have been exhibited and sold at auction, while others are held in museums and private collections.

== Background ==
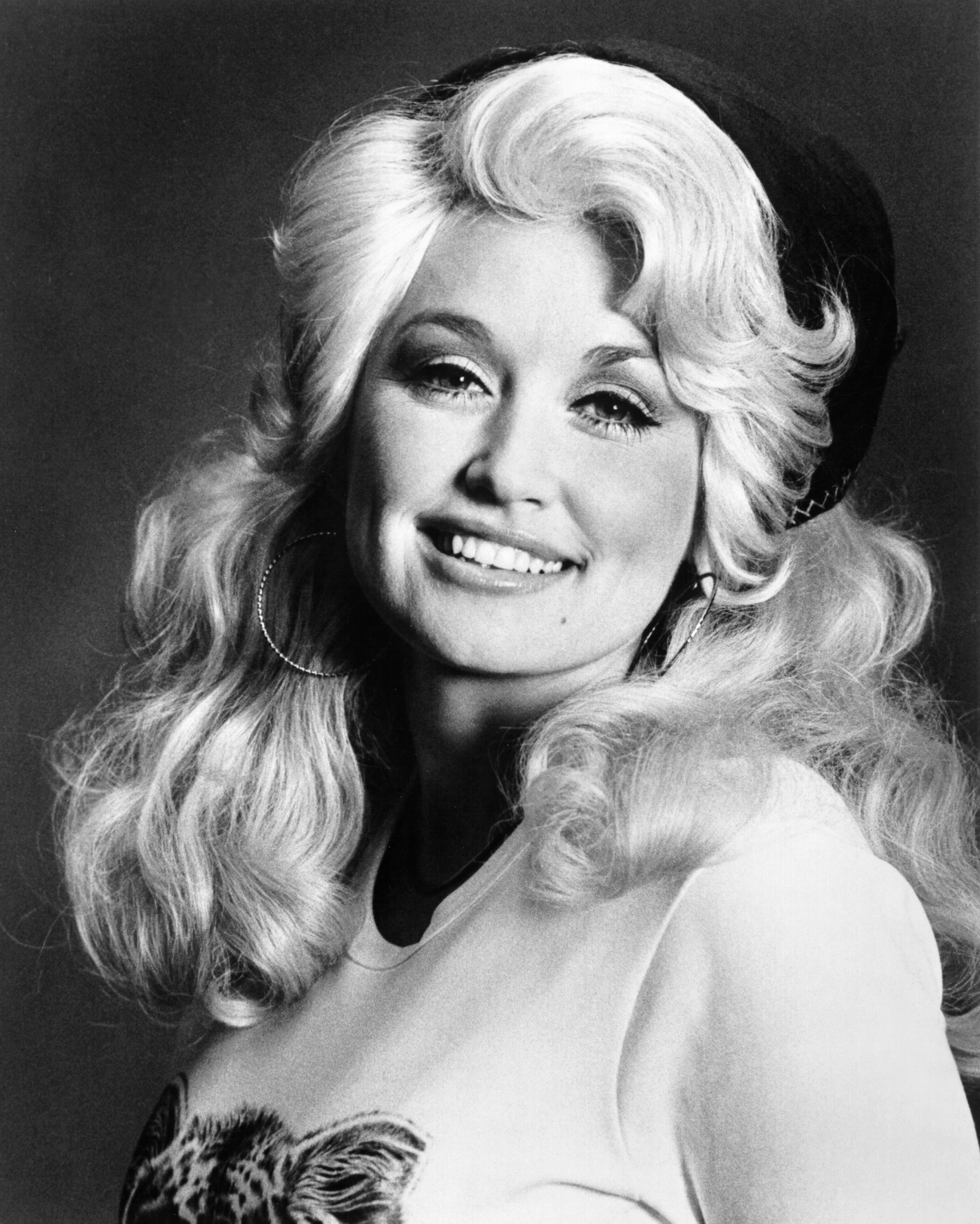
Parton in a 1977 RCA press photo

Pop artist Andy Warhol first met country singer Dolly Parton during her engagement at the Bottom Line in New York City in May 1977. Warhol attended a performance and a party RCA Records held for Parton at Windows on the World. The two became further acquainted through their mutual friend, fashion designer Halston, and Warhol documented their subsequent encounters in The Andy Warhol Diaries (1989). On October 17, 1978, Warhol noted that he spent the evening with Parton, who was now a "Halston girl," and they socialized at Studio 54 in New York City. Parton later recalled:

Andy and I would mostly just sit on the couch and watch all these crazy people out there doing their thing. We really got to know each other, just sitting on that couch. … Studio 54 was just full of energy. Everybody was having a good time. Andy and I didn't do too many drugs or drink too much alcohol, so we'd just sit and watch the people party. I met Halston there, and he liked to drink. He was at Studio 54 all the time.

On February 5, 1979, Warhol and his longtime partner Jed Johnson were invited to dinner at Halston's home with Parton, Liza Minnelli, Elizabeth Taylor, and Lorna Luft; however, Parton and Taylor did not attend.

On March 17, 1984, Parton visited Warhol's studio, the Factory, where she was interviewed by Warhol and Maura Moynihan for the July 1984 issue of Interview. Warhol recorded in his diary that Parton spoke almost continuously throughout the four-hour interview, describing her as a "walking monologue." She also told him that many of her groupies were members of the LGBT community.

In August 1985, Warhol was commissioned to paint Parton's portrait for her manager Sandy Gallin, who ultimately rejected the finished works. Warhol continued to use Parton's portrait, notably in the 1986 Neiman Marcus Christmas catalog. On January 14, 1987, shortly before his death, Warhol attended a CBS Records party for Parton at the Gotham Bar & Grill in New York City. Parton later appeared on the cover of Interview a second time in July 1989.

== Production ==
On August 14, 1985, Parton called Warhol at the Factory and proposed that he produce a portrait of her as a gift for her manager, Sandy Gallin. Although Warhol referred her to his business manager Fred Hughes and Vincent Fremont, vice president of Andy Warhol Enterprises, he agreed to photograph Parton on August 16, when he would be in Los Angeles for the wedding of pop star Madonna and actor Sean Penn.

The portrait session ended up taking place on August 17 at Gallin's residence in Beverly Hills. Parton had a home in Los Angeles, but she wanted to kept her residence private because she had received death threats. Warhol was accompanied by several people, including artist Keith Haring. Warhol noted that Gallin had already measured the locations on his walls where he intended to display the portraits. Warhol produced a series of Polaroid photographs of Parton, which he subsequently used as source images for the silkscreen portraits.

A few days after returning to New York, Warhol recorded in his diary on August 22 that Hughes asked Gallin to send a deposit for the commission, which Gallin agreed to do. On September 6, Warhol noted that artist Jean-Michel Basquiat had accidentally knocked paint onto one of the Parton portraits, damaging it while the work was still in progress. Gallin repeatedly contacted Warhol requesting the completed portraits, which underwent further adjustments. On September 9, Warhol received calls about whether Parton's beauty mark should appear in the portrait: "I'd taken it out and they want it in, so I called Rupert and told him it was in again." Two days later, he observed that "some of the Dolly Parton portraits came out light and some were dark." He said repeated calls from Los Angeles had pressured him to declare them finished, despite his feeling that "I could've done better."

After not hearing from Gallin about the portraits, Warhol called him on September 18. His secretary said that Gallin was so embarrassed, he felt that the portraits did not look like Warhol's work, and she asked for a refund of Gallin's $10,000 deposit:

And I said, "Well, sure, you know but doesn't he want me to do it again?" She said they'd thought it would be more colorful, more Pop. But I mean, I should have known, because it all started out so strange, with Dolly calling and saying that she was the one who wanted to buy it—as a gift for Sandy—and then that was just so they could get a better price. I guess, because when I said, "Well, I'd like to give you one, Dolly, for being so nice to Sandy to give these to him," they called back and said, "Well, since you were going to give a free one, why not just knock down the price instead?" You know? Hollywood. Well, I've learned things. Next time I'm going to make them work for it, like come in and see if they like the pictures and everything every single step of the way—make them work hard. Oh, and then they even said that I could try to sell it. They said they'd give "permission." So that was horrible.

== Description ==
Each 42 × 42-inch (106.7 × 106.7 cm) portrait depicts Parton in a close-up, with her face occupying most of the square composition. Her voluminous hair forms a halo-like frame around her head, while brightly colored makeup emphasizes her eyes and lips. The painting reflects Warhol's approach to celebrity portraiture, in which he produced the portraits in different color combinations. Rather than presenting a conventional likeness, Warhol emphasized the artificiality and glamour associated with celebrity.

== Aftermath and Reception ==
On October 8, Warhol recorded in his diary that Palladium nightclub owner Steve Rubell told him that the painting was actually intended for music executive David Geffen rather than Gallin. Rubell claimed that Parton had never seen the finished portrait and was unaware that Gallin wanted to hang it above his fireplace. Warhol refuted this account because Parton had been present when Gallin showed him where the painting would be displayed.

Shortly after completing the portraits, Warhol digitally manipulated an image of one of them using a Commodore Amiga 1000 during an interview for "The Creative Issue" of Amiga World (January–February 1986).

In September 1986, Warhol used one of his Dolly Parton portraits in a Today show segment about the Neiman Marcus Christmas catalog. The catalog, known for offering extravagant and unusual gifts, featured a portrait session at Warhol's studio for $35,000. The package included a trip to New York for the recipient to have their portrait painted by Warhol, with only three portrait sessions available. "A wonderful part is that later you receive 900 reproductions for Christmas cards for 1987," said Pat Morgan, Neiman's vice president of mail order merchandising.

One of the portraits was later reproduced in an interview with Warhol by Trevor Fairbrother, published in the February 1987 issue of Arts Magazine. Fairbrother asked Warhol if he were to follow John Singer Sargent's example, which work would he choose as his best if he were to offer a painting to the Metropolitan Museum of Art. Warhol selected his Dolly Parton portraits, explaining that it had been commissioned but that the client ultimately refused to pay for it. He described the portrait as "great," said that he had approximately fifteen versions, and jokingly called it his "favorite to get rid of."

Parton later recalled the commission in her book Behind the Seams: My Life in Rhinestones (2023), saying that Gallin admired Warhol's portraits of Marilyn Monroe and rejected her portrait because he had expected her to resemble Monroe. Parton quipped, "Well, I looked like Monroe—but more like Bill Monroe, the Father of Bluegrass. So Sandy didn't want the portrait and he gave it back to Andy even though he had commissioned it. And then it became worth millions. Sandy lived long enough to kick his own ass about that!"

== Interpretation ==
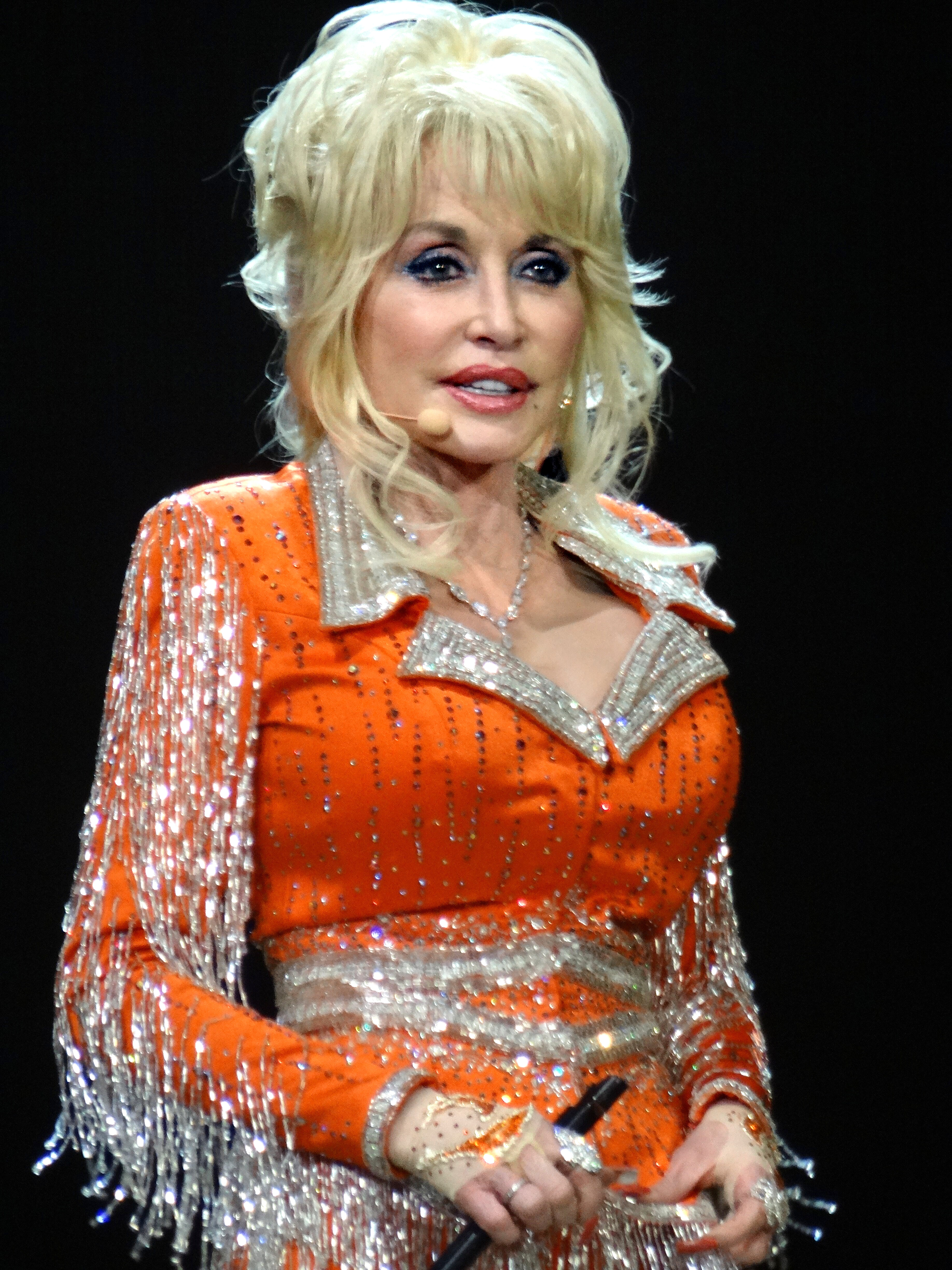
Parton in Knoxville during the Blue Smoke World Tour, 2014

Parton's larger-than-life persona closely paralleled Warhol's fascination with celebrity and his carefully constructed image. Warhol described himself as "a deeply superficial person" and he embraced Hollywood's artificiality, saying, "I love Los Angeles, and I love Hollywood. They're beautiful. Everybody's plastic, but I love plastic. I want to be plastic." For Warhol and Parton superficiality was not something to hide but rather an essential part of their public images.

In a 1977 interview with Lisa Robinson, Parton described her flamboyant appearance as an intentional part of her brand: "See, my gaudy appearance is part of my personality. It's something I enjoy, it makes me happy. I love all that glitter and glare." She added, "I like to think that people think it's cute, or funny, or ridiculous outrageous, whatever they think; because a true person, with any directness at all, can see right. through it and know that it's a kind of gimmick, a fun thing for the audience. … I'm just a character and I like to be an extremist."

Art critic Blake Gopnik, writing in The New York Times in 2026, argued that Warhol's Dolly Parton portraits were "too good," presenting an idealized image of the singer. He contrasted them with Warhol's strongest works, which he described as "weird and tough" and deliberately "wrongheaded." In Gopnik's view, the portrait captured Parton's glamorous public persona but failed to convey the "darkness that lurks beneath" her work.

Parton's desire to reach a broader audience also echoed Warhol's move beyond painting. In 1977, she explained her move from country music toward pop: "I wanted total musical freedom," adding, "There was so much more I could do than to just have it labeled as country" and "I just want to reach more people." Parton extended her career into acting and business, including the development of Dollywood theme park. She later said that "there's more to me than the big hair and the phoney stuff." Warhol likewise called himself as a "business artist," working across film, theater, and television. Both transformed their original artistic identities into expansive careers and become icons in popular culture.

== Exhibitions ==
Two Dolly Parton portraits were included in the exhibition About Face: Andy Warhol Portraits, held at the Wadsworth Atheneum in Hartford from September 23, 1999 to January 30, 2000. The exhibition subsequently traveled to the Miami Art Museum in Miami, where it was presented from March 24 to June 4, 2000.

A portrait of Parton was included in Andy Warhol: Portraits, held at the Tony Shafrazi Gallery in New York City from May 12 to October 1, 2005.

Two Dolly Parton portraits were included in the exhibition Andy Warhol: A Celebration of Life … and Death held at the National Gallery of Scotland in Edinburgh from August 4 to October 7, 2007.

A Dolly Parton portrait was included in Warhol's retrospective Andy Warhol—From A to B and Back Again at the Whitney Museum of American Art in New York City from November 12, 2018, to March 31, 2019.

Two Dolly Parton portraits were included in Impressionist, Modern, and Post-War Masters at Acquavella Gallery in Palm Beach, Florida, from April 1 to May 28, 2021.

A portrait of Parton was included in the exhibition FAME: Andy Warhol in AlUla at Maraya Concert Hall in AlUla, Saudi Arabia from February 17 to May 16, 2023.

One Dolly Parton portrait was included in Pop Masters: Art from the Mugrabi Collection, New York, presented at HOTA Gallery (Home of the Arts) on the Gold Coast in Surfers Paradise, Queensland, from February 18 to June 4, 2023.

== Collections ==
A Dolly Parton portrait featuring blue accents and hoop earrings is in the collection of the San Francisco Museum of Modern Art in San Francisco. The Andy Warhol Museum in Pittsburgh holds two portraits: one depicting Parton with purple-toned skin and blue oval earrings, and another featuring platinum blonde hair and blue oval earrings. Another portrait of Parton with blonde hair, mint-colored oval earrings, and purple eyeshadow, is held in the Mugrabi Collection. Television talk show host Andy Cohen also owns a Dolly Parton portrait.

== Art market ==
In May 2010, a Dolly Parton portrait featuring gold accents, purple eyeshadow, and hoop earrings sold for $914,500 at Sotheby's in New York.

In November 2010, a Dolly Parton portrait featuring pastel pink hair, blue eyeshadow, and gold oval earrings sold for $746,500 at Sotheby's in New York.

In May 2012, a Dolly Parton portrait featuring cotton-candy-colored hair and blue oval earrings sold for $626,500 at Christie's in New York.
