= Better Day World Tour =

2011 concert tour by Dolly Parton

- Tour by Dolly Parton
- Advertisement for the tour
- Associated album: Better Day
- Start date: July 17, 2011
- End date: December 1, 2011
- Legs: 4
- No. of shows: 20 in North America; 18 in Europe; 11 in Australia; 49 Total
- Box office: US$34 million

Dolly Parton concert chronology
- Backwoods Barbie Tour (2008); Better Day World Tour (2011); Blue Smoke World Tour (2014)

The Better Day World Tour was the tenth concert tour by American recording artist, Dolly Parton. Visiting North America, Europe and Australia, the tour supported her 43rd studio album, Better Day. With nearly 275,000 tickets sold, and an overall gross of $34 million, it is Parton's most successful tour. The tour was her first visit to Australia in 30 years.

== Background ==
In January 2011, Parton told media outlet she planned to release an album in 2011 and a supporting tour. A month later, British webzine Glasswerk announced the tour to visit Scotland, England and Ireland. In March, the tour was expanded to include dates in the United States. Parton explained the tour would be a joyful celebration full of hope and inspires to look towards better days. To introduce the tour, Parton remarks:

"I’m very excited, first of all, to be going back on tour at all. But I love the fans and I miss the live stage shows. With the new stage show I hope to have a lot of new things for the fans, especially all the new songs from the Better Day CD and some new and different segments in the show with a lot more fun things as well."

The tour began on July 17, 2011, at the Thompson–Boling Arena in Knoxville, Tennessee. The inaugural concert benefited Parton's Dollywood Foundation. All proceeds from the concert were donated to the Imagination Library, providing educational opportunities to children in various communities.

== Broadcasts & Recordings ==
Footage was recorded on 22–23 November 2011 at Rod Laver Arena, Melbourne, Australia for a live DVD. The release date has not been announced although Liquid Crystal Productions has stated it will be released in 2013.

== Set list ==
This set list is representative of the show in Knoxville, Tennessee. It is not representative of all concerts for the duration of the tour

1. "Walking on Sunshine" (contains excerpts from "Shine Like the Sun")
2. "Better Get to Livin'"
3. "Jolene"
4. "Rocky Top"
5. "Mule Skinner Blues"
6. "Help!"
7. "Shine"
8. "Stairway to Heaven"
9. "My Tennessee Mountain Home"
10. "Precious Memories"
11. "Coat of Many Colors"
12. "Smoky Mountain Memories"
13. "Son of a Preacher Man"
14. "Better Day"
15. "Together You and I"
16. "Holding Everything"
17. "Joyful Noise"
18. "He Will Take You Higher" (contains excerpts from "I Want to Take You Higher")
19. "He's Everything"
20. "White Limozeen"
21. "The Best of Both Worlds"
22. "The Sacrifice"
23. "In the Meantime"
24. "Little Sparrow"
25. "River Deep – Mountain High"
26. "Here You Come Again
27. "Islands in the Stream"
28. "9 to 5"

Encore

29. "I Will Always Love You"
30. "Light of a Clear Blue Morning"

== Tour dates ==
Date	City	Country	Venue
North America
July 17, 2011	Knoxville	United States	Thompson–Boling Arena
July 19, 2011	Grand Prairie	United States	Verizon Theatre at Grand Prairie
July 20, 2011	Albuquerque	United States	Sandia Casino Amphitheater
July 22, 2011	Los Angeles	United States	Hollywood Bowl
July 23, 2011	Los Angeles	United States	Hollywood Bowl
July 24, 2011	Concord	United States	Sleep Train Pavilion
July 27, 2011	Prior Lake	United States	Mystic Showroom
July 28, 2011	Rosemont	United States	Rosemont Theatre
July 30, 2011	Wallingford	United States	Oakdale Theatre
July 31, 2011	Vienna	United States	Filene Center
August 2, 2011	Durham	United States	Durham Performing Arts Center
August 3, 2011	Alpharetta	United States	Verizon Wireless Amphitheatre
Europe
August 20, 2011	Glasgow	Scotland	Scottish Exhibition and Conference Centre
August 21, 2011	Glasgow	Scotland	Scottish Exhibition and Conference Centre
August 22, 2011	Nottingham	England	Capital FM Arena Nottingham
August 25, 2011	Copenhagen	Denmark	Forum Copenhagen
August 27, 2011	Stockholm	Sweden	Ericsson Globe
August 28, 2011	Gothenburg	Sweden	Scandinavium
August 31, 2011	Liverpool	England	Echo Arena Liverpool
September 2, 2011	Birmingham	England	LG Arena
September 3, 2011	Cardiff	England	Motorpoint Arena Cardiff
September 4, 2011	Cardiff	England	Motorpoint Arena Cardiff
September 6, 2011	Bournemouth	England	Windsor Hall
September 7, 2011	London	England	The O_{2} Arena
September 8, 2011	London	England	The O_{2} Arena
September 10, 2011	Newcastle	England	Metro Radio Arena
September 11, 2011	Manchester	England	Manchester Evening News Arena
September 12, 2011	Sheffield	England	Motorpoint Arena Sheffield
September 14, 2011	Dublin	Ireland	The O_{2}
September 15, 2011	Belfast	Ireland	Odyssey Arena
North America
October 7, 2011	Cedar Park	United States	Cedar Park Center
October 8, 2011	Tulsa	United States	BOK Center
October 10, 2011	Biloxi	United States	Mississippi Coast Coliseum
October 11, 2011	Houston	United States	Verizon Wireless Theater
October 14, 2011	Valdosta	United States	All Star Amphitheatre
October 15, 2011	Clearwater	United States	Ruth Eckerd Hall
October 16, 2011	Sarasota	United States	Van Wezel Performing Arts Hall
October 18, 2011	Hollywood	United States	Hard Rock Live
Australia
November 8, 2011	Perth	Australia	Burswood Dome
November 12, 2011	Adelaide	Australia	Adelaide Entertainment Centre
November 15, 2011	Sydney	Australia	Allphones Arena
November 19, 2011	Pokolbin	Australia	Hope Estate Winery Amphitheatre
November 20, 2011	Pokolbin	Australia	Hope Estate Winery Amphitheatre
November 22, 2011	Melbourne	Australia	Rod Laver Arena
November 23, 2011	Melbourne	Australia	Rod Laver Arena
November 25, 2011	Brisbane	Australia	Brisbane Entertainment Centre
November 26, 2011	Brisbane	Australia	Brisbane Entertainment Centre
November 27, 2011	Brisbane	Australia	Brisbane Entertainment Centre
November 29, 2011	Sydney	Australia	Allphones Arena
December 1, 2011	Melbourne	Australia	Rod Laver Arena

=== Box office score data ===
Venue	City	Tickets sold / available	Gross revenue
Thompson–Boling Arena	Knoxville	8,572 / 9,193 (93%)	$450,574
Verizon Theater at Grand Prairie	Grand Prairie	3,811 / 3,923 (97%)	$244,775
Rosemont Theatre	Rosemont	3,181 / 3,500 (91%)	$305,163
Durham Performing Arts Center	Durham	2,634 / 2,634 (100%)	$200,070
Scottish Exhibition and Conference Centre	Glasgow	16,822 / 17,237 (97%)	$1,782,970
Capital FM Arena Nottingham	Nottingham	6,595 / 7,249 (91%)	$684,472
Forum Copenhagen	Copenhagen	7,522 / 7,522 (100%)	$1,036,190
Ericsson Globe	Stockholm	11,016 / 11,700 (94%)	$1,163,080
Scandinavium	Gothenburg	6,985 / 7,900 (88%)	$775,750
Echo Arena Liverpool	Liverpool	9,191 / 9,305 (99%)	$931,719
LG Arena	Birmingham	11,317 / 12,437 (91%)	$1,174,750
Motorpoint Arena Cardiff	Cardiff	9,478 / 9,548 (99%)	$1,016,210
Windsor Hall	Bournemouth	3,337 / 3,373 (99%)	$338,780
The O_{2} Arena	London	25,308 / 27,278 (93%)	$2,911,080
Metro Radio Arena	Newcastle	8,318 / 9,602 (87%)	$850,448
Manchester Evening News Arena	Manchester	10,925 / 12,202 (89%)	$1,106,630
Motorpoint Arena Sheffield	Sheffield	7,195 / 10,988 (65%)	$734,925
The O_{2}	Dublin	7,589 / 8,300 (91%)	$938,481
Odyssey Arena	Belfast	5,351 / 7,300 (73%)	$596,605
Cedar Park Center	Cedar Park	3,783 / 4,034 (94%)	$253,165
BOK Center	Tulsa	4,157 / 5,389 (77%)	$265,209
Mississippi Coast Coliseum	Biloxi	2,491 / 4,973 (50%)	$178,114
Ruth Eckerd Hall	Clearwater	2,114 / 2,114 (100%)	$229,518
Burswood Dome	Perth	12,494 / 13,622 (92%)	$1,922,350
Adelaide Entertainment Centre	Adelaide	5,957 / 6,663 (89%)	$999,978
Allphones Arena	Sydney	15,707 / 16,679 (94%)	$2,630,460
Hope Estate Winery Amphitheatre	Pokolbin	14,127 / 31,624 (45%)	$1,956,130
Rod Laver Arena	Melbourne	25,882 / 28,208 (92%)	$4,192,030
Brisbane Entertainment Centre	Brisbane	21,691 / 27,594 (79%)	$3,787,570
TOTAL		273,550 / 322,091 (85%)	$33,657,196
