= Porter 'n' Dolly =

Studio album by Porter Wagoner and Dolly Parton
- Released: August 19, 1974
- Recorded: September 30, 1971–May 24, 1974
- Studio: RCA Studio B (Nashville)
- Genre: Country
- Length: 24:22
- Label: RCA Victor
- Producer: Bob Ferguson

Porter Wagoner and Dolly Parton chronology
Love & Music (1973)	Porter 'n' Dolly (1974)	Say Forever You'll Be Mine (1975)

Dolly Parton chronology
Jolene (1974)	Porter 'n' Dolly (1974)	Love Is Like a Butterfly (1974)

Singles from Porter 'n' Dolly
- 1. "Please Don't Stop Loving Me" Released: July 15, 1974

Porter 'n' Dolly is the eleventh collaborative studio album by Porter Wagoner and Dolly Parton. It was released on August 19, 1974, by RCA Victor. Though they had each topped the U.S. country singles chart individually many times, "Please Don't Stop Loving Me", from this album, was their only duet to reach #1 on the U.S. country singles chart.

Parton re-recorded "The Fire That Keeps You Warm" for her 1976 album All I Can Do.

Parton also re-recorded "Together You and I" for her 2011 album, Better Day.

== Critical reception ==
Professional ratings
Review scores
Source	Rating
The Encyclopedia of Popular Music	3/5 stars

Billboard gave a positive review of the album, noting that all of the album's tracks were written by Wagoner and Parton. They continued by saying the album contains "some nice ballads, some up-tempo, but [they are] all good listening." The review indicated "We'd Have to Be Crazy", "Two", and "The Power of Love" as the best cuts on the album. The review concluded with a note to record dealers that the album's "portrait cover will enhance display."

In another positive review, Cashbox said, "Although Porter and Dolly have each assumed their own artistic identities as far as live performing, they are still recording together. This new LP features some excellent material and the inimitable duo are sounding better than ever. The LP is a sparkling collection and Porter and Dolly have always stood as an exceptional duo on the country music scene. "Please Don't Stop Loving Me" is an up-tempo ditty that professes that they need each other. "The Fire That Keeps You Warm" is a heart warming tune that tells of true love."

== Recording ==
Recording sessions for the album took place on May 23 and 24, 1974, at RCA Studio B in Nashville, Tennessee. These two sessions produced eight of the album's ten tracks. The two other tracks were recorded during sessions for previous albums. "Sounds of Nature" was recorded during a September 30, 1971 session for 1972's The Right Combination • Burning the Midnight Oil and "Together You and I" was recorded during the May 1, 1972 session for 1972's Together Always.

== Track listing ==
Track listing, writing credits and track length adapted from LP sleeve. All songs written by Dolly Parton, except where noted.

Side one
No.	Title	Writer(s)	Recording date	Length
1.	"Please Don't Stop Loving Me"	Parton; Porter Wagoner	May 24, 1974	2:45
2.	"The Fire That Keeps You Warm"		May 23, 1974	2:07
3.	"Too Far Gone"		May 23, 1974	2:10
4.	"We'd Have to Be Crazy"		May 24, 1974	2:32
5.	"The Power of Love"	Wagoner	May 24, 1974	2:22

Side two
No.	Title	Writer(s)	Recording date	Length
1.	"Sixteen Years"	Wagoner; Tom Pick	May 23, 1974	2:47
2.	"Together You and I"		May 1, 1972	2:20
3.	"Without You"		May 23, 1974	2:25
4.	"Two"		May 23, 1974	2:37
5.	"Sounds of Nature"	Parton; Wagoner	September 30, 1971	2:17
