= Forum Copenhagen =

Indoor arena

- Forum København
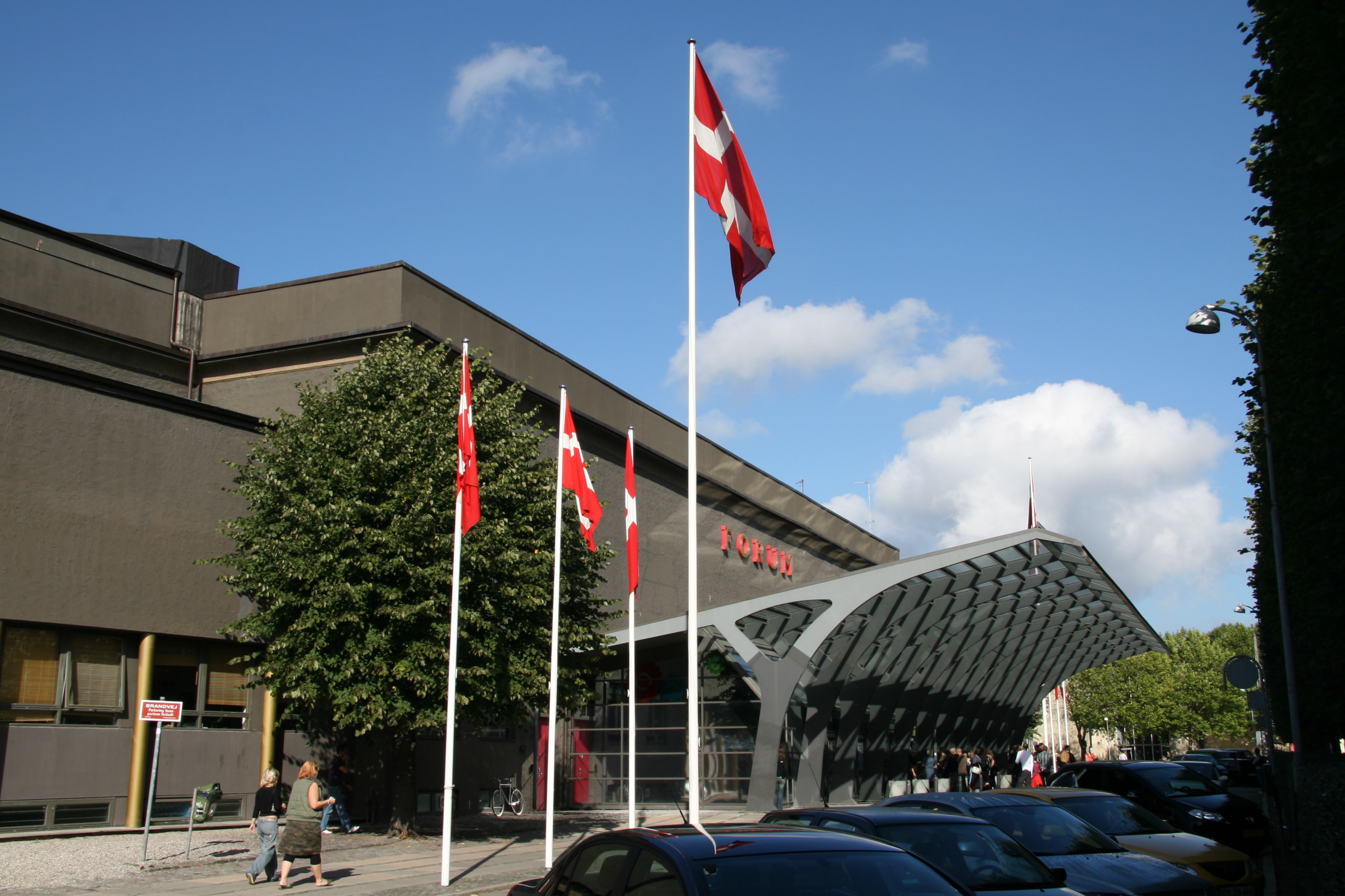
- The Forum in October 2006
- Interactive map of Forum Copenhagen
- Location: Julius Thomsens Plads 1, 1925; Frederiksberg, Copenhagen
- Coordinates: 55°40′50″N 12°33′8″E
- Owner: Bella Center Group
- Capacity: 10,000 (standing); 8,500 (seated)
- Record attendance: 10,891 (Britney Spears concert, 9 May 2004)
- Acreage: 5,000 m^{2>} (combined)
- Public transit: Forum Station

Construction
- Groundbreaking: 25 September 1925
- Opened: 20 February 1926
- Renovated: 1996–97
- Expanded: 1947, 1954–55
- Cost: 70 million NOK (1997)
- Architects: Oscar Gundlach-Pedersen; Poul Henningsen

Website
- www.forumcopenhagen.dk

Forum Copenhagen (Danish: Forum København) is a large multi-purpose, rentable indoor arena located in Frederiksberg, Denmark. It hosts a large variety of concerts, markets, exhibitions and other events. The venue can hold up to 10,000 people depending on the event. The Forum operates as a convention center, concert hall and indoor arena.

It was opened in February 1926 to host a car exhibition and was last renovated in 1996–97. Over two storeys there is a combined exhibition floor area of 5,000 m^{2} and a separate restaurant for up to 250 seated guests. The Metro station Forum is adjacent to the building.

== History ==
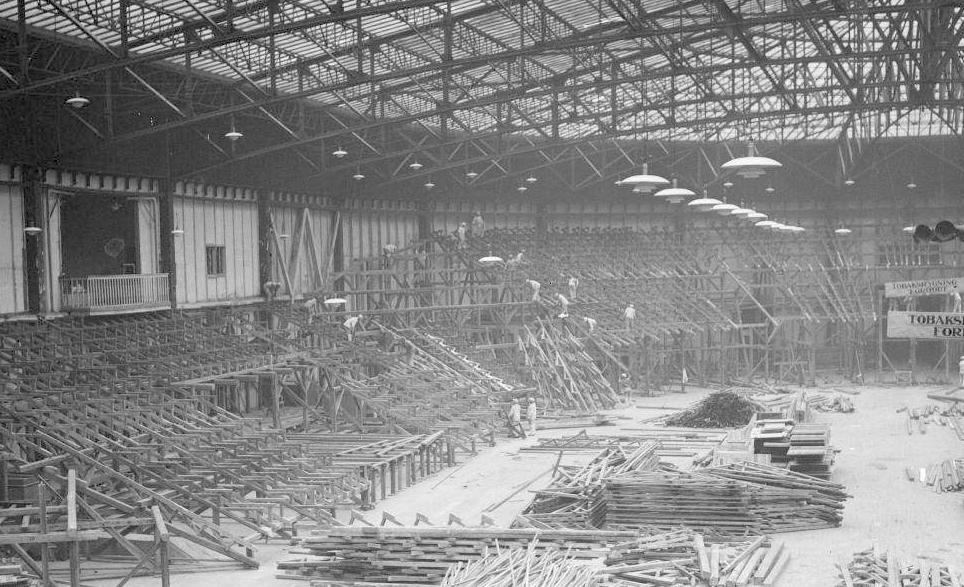
Construction of bicycle races path at the first Forum building (before it was destroyed in 1943)

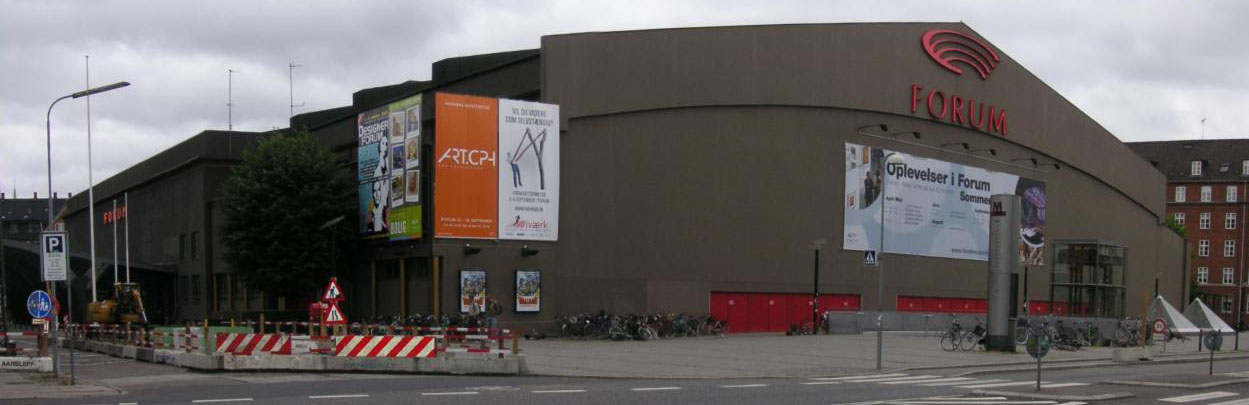
Forum Copenhagen (July 2005)

On August 11, 1925, the construction committee signed the contract to build the venue. On 25 September 1925, Prime Minister Thorvald Stauning laid the foundation stone for the construction. Forum opened for the first time on February 20, 1926, for this year's major automotive exhibition. Forum Copenhagen was designed by Oscar Gundlach-Pedersen, and the lighting was from Poul Henningsen's brand new PH-lamp.

In 1929 it held an architecture exhibition, which was one of the first presentations of functionalism in Denmark, namely the Housing and Building Exhibition in Forum. It was at this exhibition that Arne Jacobsen and Flemming Lassen exhibited their subscription to the cylindrical "House of the Future".

During World War II, the Danish resistance movement group Holger Danske destroyed the original hall in an act of sabotage in August 1943. The hall was first rebuilt and extended in 1947. An annual six-day bicycle race was originally held here and was later moved to Ballerup Super Arena. In 1997, the Forum concluded an extensive renovation of the roof costing 70 million DKK, resulting in better acoustic sound and more concerts.

== Concerts and events ==
The venue has hosted numerous music acts since its opening.

=== List of events ===
Artist	Dates	Tour	Opening Act
2023
Lamb of God & Kreator	February 22	State of Unrest Tour	Municipal Waste
2019
Troye Sivan	March 18	The Bloom Tour	
2018
5 Seconds Of Summer	November 8	Meet You There Tour	
Lauryn Hill	December 8	20th Anniversary tour	
Demi Lovato	May 30	Tell Me You Love Me World Tour	Joy
Rag'n'Bone Man	February 28	Grande Reserve	
Toto	February 17	40 Trips Around the Sun Tour	
Alt-J	January 23	Relaxer Tour	
2017
Bryan Adams	February 8	Get Up Tour	
The xx	February 10	I See You Tour	
Queens of the Stone Age	November 14	Villains World Tour	
2016
The Cure	October 14		
Muse	June 8 and 9	Drones Tour 2016	
Chris Brown	June 5	One Hell Of a Nite Tour	
Ellie Goulding	March 5	Delirium World Tour	
Mariah Carey	March 29	Sweet Sweet Fantasy Tour	
Adele	May 3	Adele Live 2016	
5 Seconds Of Summer	May 29	Sounds Live Feels Live World Tour	
2015
Slipknot	February 12	Prepare For Hell Tour	
Cirque Du Soleil	February 18–22	Quidam	
Usher	February 27	UR Experience Tour	
Bryan Adams	March 19	Reckless: 30th Anniversary Tour	
Dizzy Mizz Lizzy	May 2		
André Rieu	May 7		
5 Seconds Of Summer	May 12	Rock Out with Your Socks Out Tour	
2014
Disney On Ice	February 12–13		
Michael Bublé	February 26	To Be Loved Tour	
Drake	March 3	Would You Like A Tour?	
Hansi Hinterseer	March 7	Hansi Hinterseer 2015	
Backstreet Boys	March 15	In A World Like This Tour	
Nine Inch Nails	May 13		
André Rieu	May 17	André Rieu 2014	
Riverdance	May 22–24		
Cliff Richard	May 28	Still Reelin' And A-Rockin' Tour	
Miley Cyrus	June 4	Bangerz Tour	
Dolly Parton	July 8	Blue Smoke World Tour	
Neil Young & Crazy Horse	July 30		
Pharrell Williams	September 12	Dear Girl Tour	
Britney Spears	September 25	Intimate Britney Spears Collection Launch	
Danish Music Awards	November 8		
Ed Sheeran	November 11	X Tour	
Elton John	November 12	Follow The Yellow Brick Road Tour	
2013
Hey Jude Theaterconcert	January 2–6, 8–13, 15–20		
Cirque Du Soleil	February 13–17, 19–24	Alegria	
We Will Rock You	March 12–17	We Will Rock You: 10th Anniversary Tour	
Shrek The Musical	April 5–7, 10–14, 17–21, 26–28		
One Direction	May 10	Take Me Home Tour	Camryn
Beyoncé	May 27	The Mrs. Carter Show World Tour	
Eros Ramazzotti	May 31		
Kiss	June 11	Monster Tour	
Mark Knopfler	June 16	Privateering Tour	
Soundgarden	September 9		
John Mayer	October 16	Born and Raised World Tour	
Nephew	October 18	Hjertestarter Tour	
Bruno Mars	October 31	Moonshine Jungle Tour	
The National	November 2		
Danish Music Awards	November 9		
Nickelback	November 13	Here And Now Tour	
Volbeat	November 24	Shady Ladies and Outlaw Gentlemen Tour	
Black Sabbath	November 26	Black Sabbath Reunion Tour	
Queens Of The Stone Age	November 29		
Volbeat	December 1	Shady Ladies And Outlaw Gentlemen Tour	
2012
Disney On Ice	February 15–16		
Rammstein	February 21	Made In Germany 1995–2011 Tour	
Hansi Hinterseer	March 8		
Elvis Presley in Concert	March 24		
Il Divo	March 25		
Top Gear	March 29 – April 1	List of Top Gear Live performances	
Drake	April 13	Club Paradise Tour	
André Rieu	April 21		
Avicii	May 4		
Skrillex	May 5		
Pearl Jam	July 10	Pearl Jam 2012 Tour	
We Love The '90s	September 1		
Walking With Dinosaurs	October 17–21	The Arena Spetacular	
Jennifer Lopez	November 3	Dance Again World Tour	
Bon Iver	November 4		
Danish Music Awards	November 10		
Chris Brown	November 14	Carpe Diem Tour	
Swedish House Mafia	November 26	One Last Tour	
Hey Jude Theaterconcert	December 28–31		
2011
Jeff Dunham	April 13		
Sade	May 9	Sade Live	
Robin Gibb	June 2		
Jerry Seinfeld	June 6		
Dolly Parton	August 25	Better Day World Tour	
2010
John Mayer	May 30	Battle Studies World Tour	
2008
Kylie Minogue	June 8	KylieX2008	
2007
Gwen Stefani	October 14	Sweet Escape Tour	
Linkin Park	May 24	Minutes to Midnight World Tour	
2004
Britney Spears	May 9	The Onyx Hotel Tour	
Anastacia	October 20	Live at Last Tour	
2003–
Various	November 15	Junior Eurovision Song Contest 2003	
2002
Various	April 27	MGP Nordic 2002	
Destiny's Child	May 25	Destiny's Child World Tour	
Kylie Minogue	June 1	KylieFever2002	
2001
Westlife	April 24	Where Dreams Come True Tour	
U2	June 6 & 7	Elevation Tour	
1998
Janet Jackson	May 11	The Velvet Rope Tour	
Spice Girls	May 22–23	Spiceworld Tour	
1997
Oasis	September 10	Be Here Now Tour	
1995
Janet Jackson	March 9	Janet World Tour	
1993
Bon Jovi	April 12	Keep the Faith Tour	
1992
Metallica	December 9-10	Wherever We May Roam Tour	
1980
Bob Marley and The Wailers	June 18	Uprising Tour	

=== Esports ===
On 22nd–24th of July 2022, the arena plays host for the playoff games of the 2022 Valorant Champions Tour: Stage 2 Masters, in which it hosts the Semifinals and the Grand Finals with live audience, making it the first international Valorant Esports event to be held with live audience.

On 5th-7th May 2023, the venue also hosted the finals stage of the BLAST Rainbow Six Siege Major Copenhagen.

== See also ==
- List of indoor arenas in Denmark
- List of indoor arenas in Nordic countries
