= Avicii Arena =

Indoor arena in Stockholm, Sweden

Globen (Avicii Arena)
- Globen

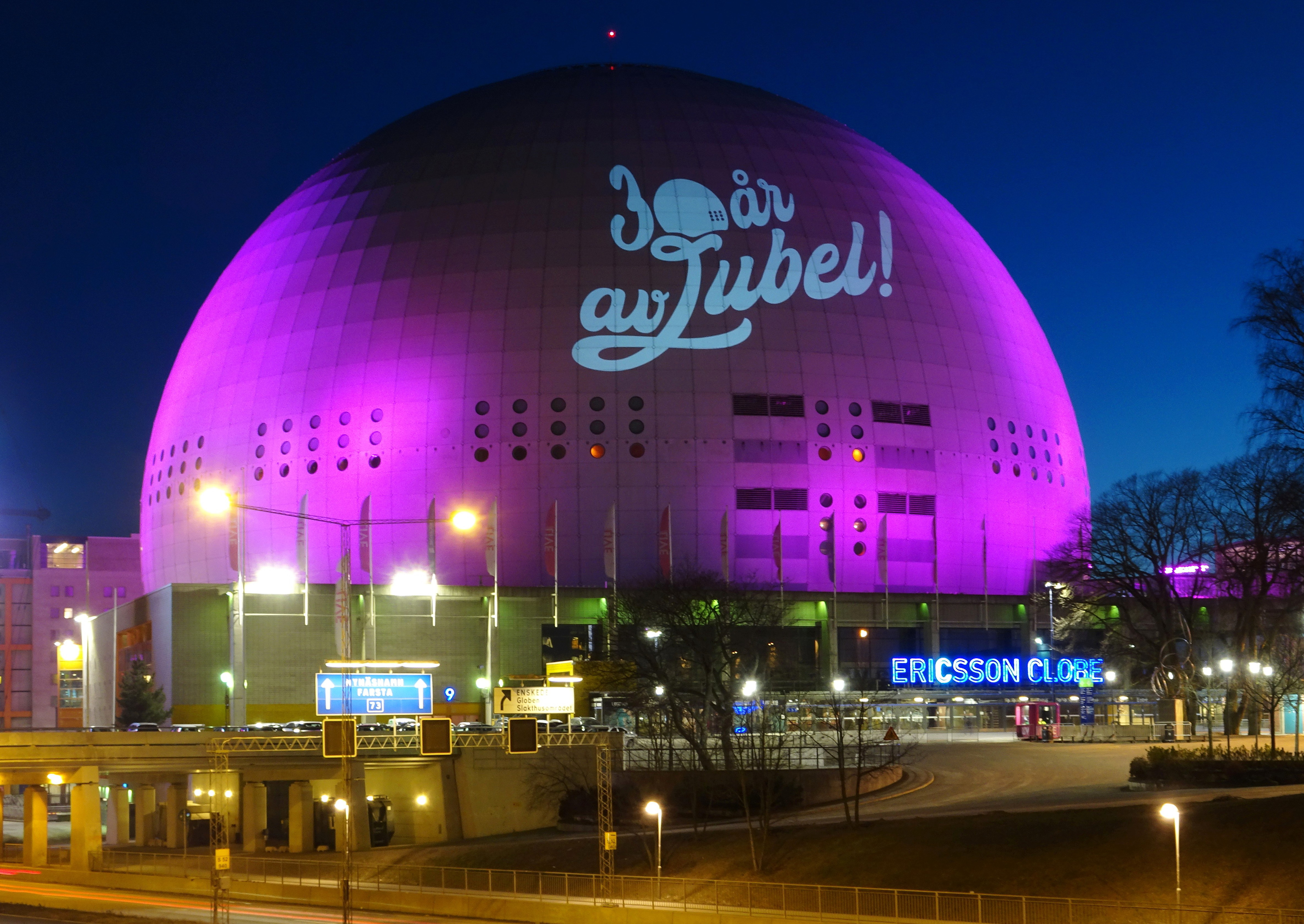
- Globe celebrates 30 years, February 2019
- Interactive map of Globen (Avicii Arena)
- Former names: Stockholm Globe Arena (1989–2009); Ericsson Globe (2009–2021)
- Location: 121 77 Johanneshov, Stockholm, Sweden
- Coordinates: 59°17′37″N 18°5′0″E
- Owner: City of Stockholm via SGA Fastigheter
- Operator: AEG Live
- Capacity: 13,950 (ice hockey); 16,000 (concerts)
- Record attendance: 17,303 (Metallica, 5 May 2018)
- Public transit: Globen

Construction
- Groundbreaking: 10 September 1986
- Built: 1986–1989
- Opened: 19 February 1989
- Architects: Svante Berg, Lars Vretblad

Tenants
- Sweden men's national ice hockey team AIK Hockey; Djurgårdens IF Hockey

Website
- aviciiarena.se

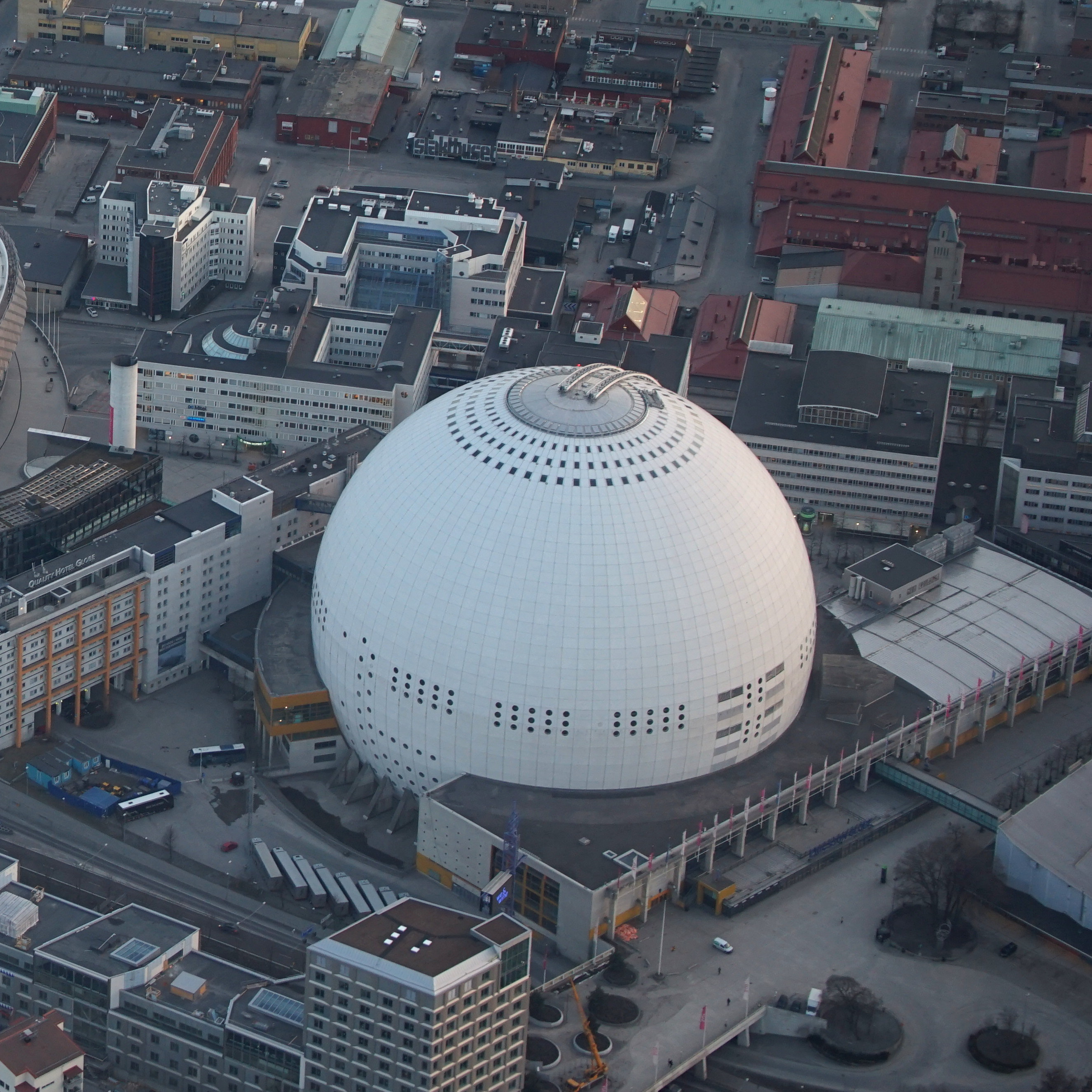
Aerial view, April 2018

Avicii Arena is a multi-purpose arena in Stockholm Globe City, Johanneshov district of Stockholm, Sweden near the Globen metro station. The arena was previously named Stockholm Globe Arena and Ericsson Globe and is referred to in Swedish simply as Globen (Swedish: [ˈɡlǔːbɛn]; lit. 'the Globe'), as it is shaped like a globe and represents the Sun in the Sweden Solar System, the world's largest scale model of the Solar System.

Avicii Arena is the second largest spherical building on Earth (overtaken by the Las Vegas Sphere in 2023) and took two and a half years to build. It has a diameter of 110 metres (360 ft) and an inner height of 65 metres (213 ft). The volume of the building is 605,000 cubic metres (21,400,000 cu ft) and it has a seating capacity of 16,000 spectators for shows and concerts, and 13,850 for ice hockey. In the upper area there are 40 VIP boxes and a restaurant. The building was designed by Berg Arkitektkontor AB and the globe structure was constructed by Mero-Schmidlin.

== History ==
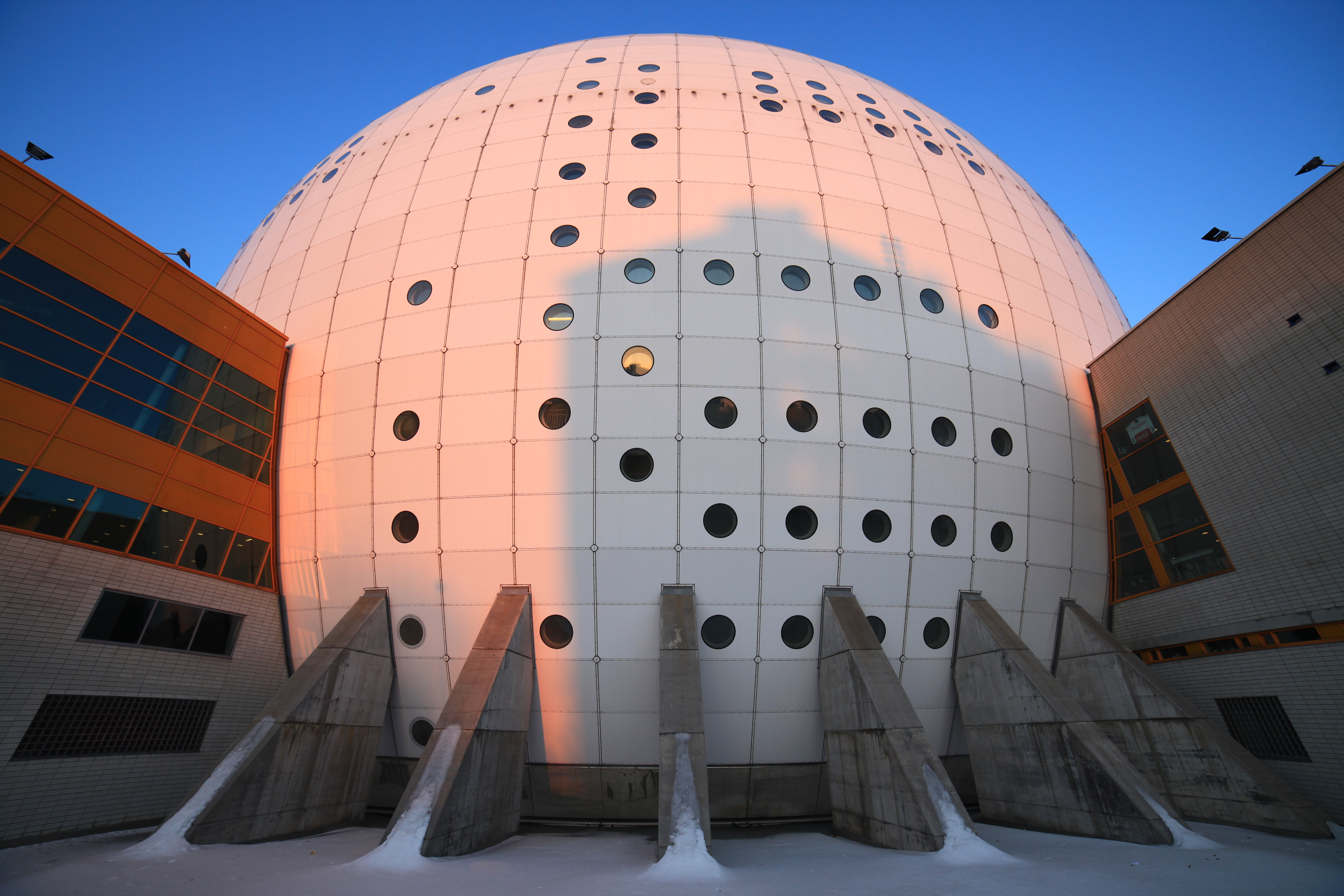
View of Globen from the east side

Globen was inaugurated on 19 February 1989 after a construction period of less than three years. The first major events were Melodifestivalen 1989, the 1989 Ice Hockey World Championships and the Men's European Volleyball Championships.

In 2009, the naming rights to the Stockholm Globe Arena were acquired by Ericsson, and it became known as the Ericsson Globe.

In 2021, the arena was renamed Avicii Arena after Avicii, who died in 2018. To commemorate the new name, the Royal Stockholm Philharmonic Orchestra recorded a performance of the Avicii song "For a Better Day", with vocals provided by fourteen-year-old Swedish singer Ella Tiritiello.

In 2024, a $92 million modernization, overseen by NCC and led by HOK with C.F. Møller Architects and Schlaich Bergermann was implemented. Upgrades included a retractable acoustic ceiling with reflective panels, new premium hospitality spaces and the introduction of gondola seating. The arena reopened in February 2025.

== Events ==
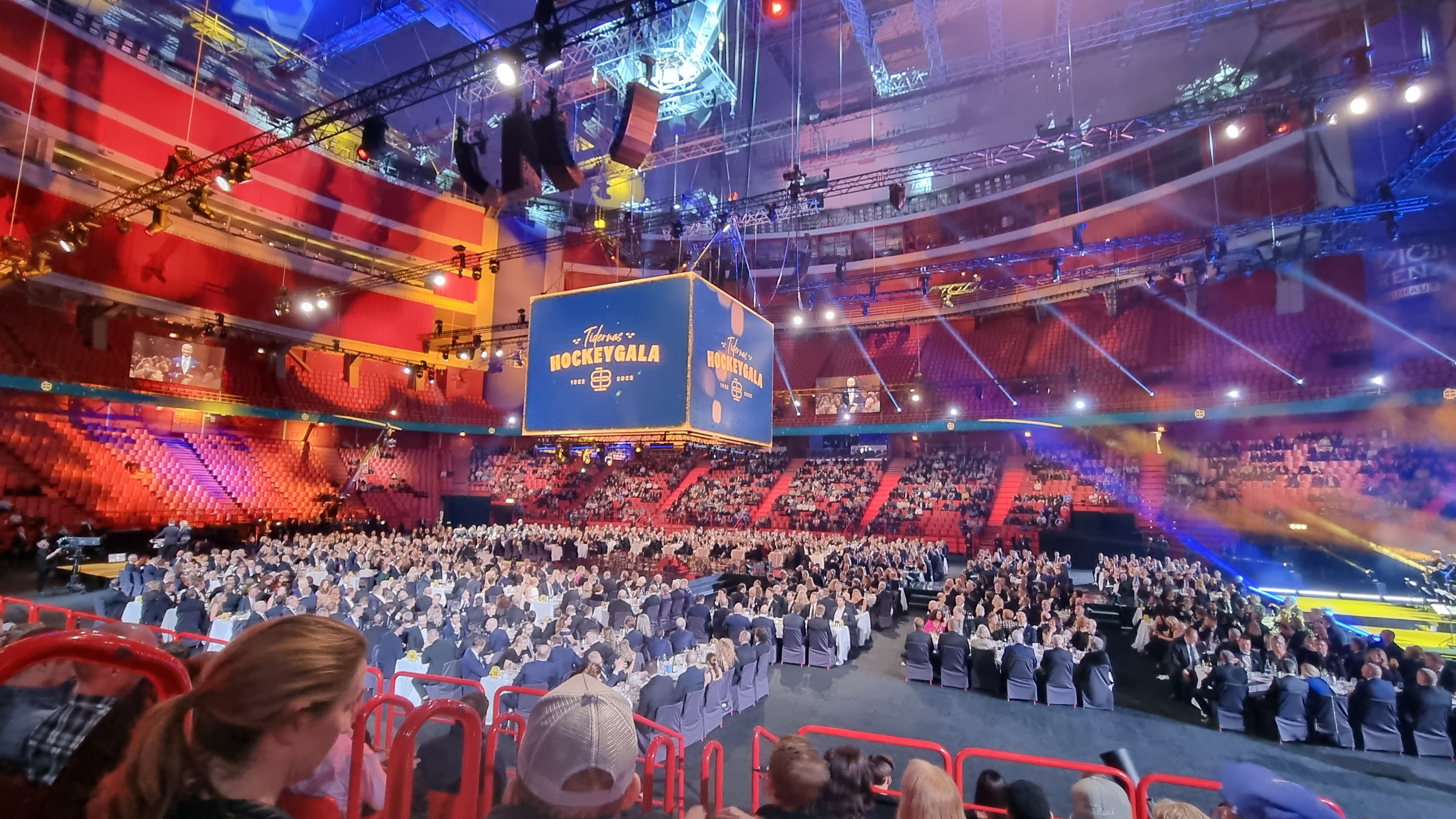
Swedish Ice Hockey Association's 100th anniversary All Time Hockey Gala in 2022

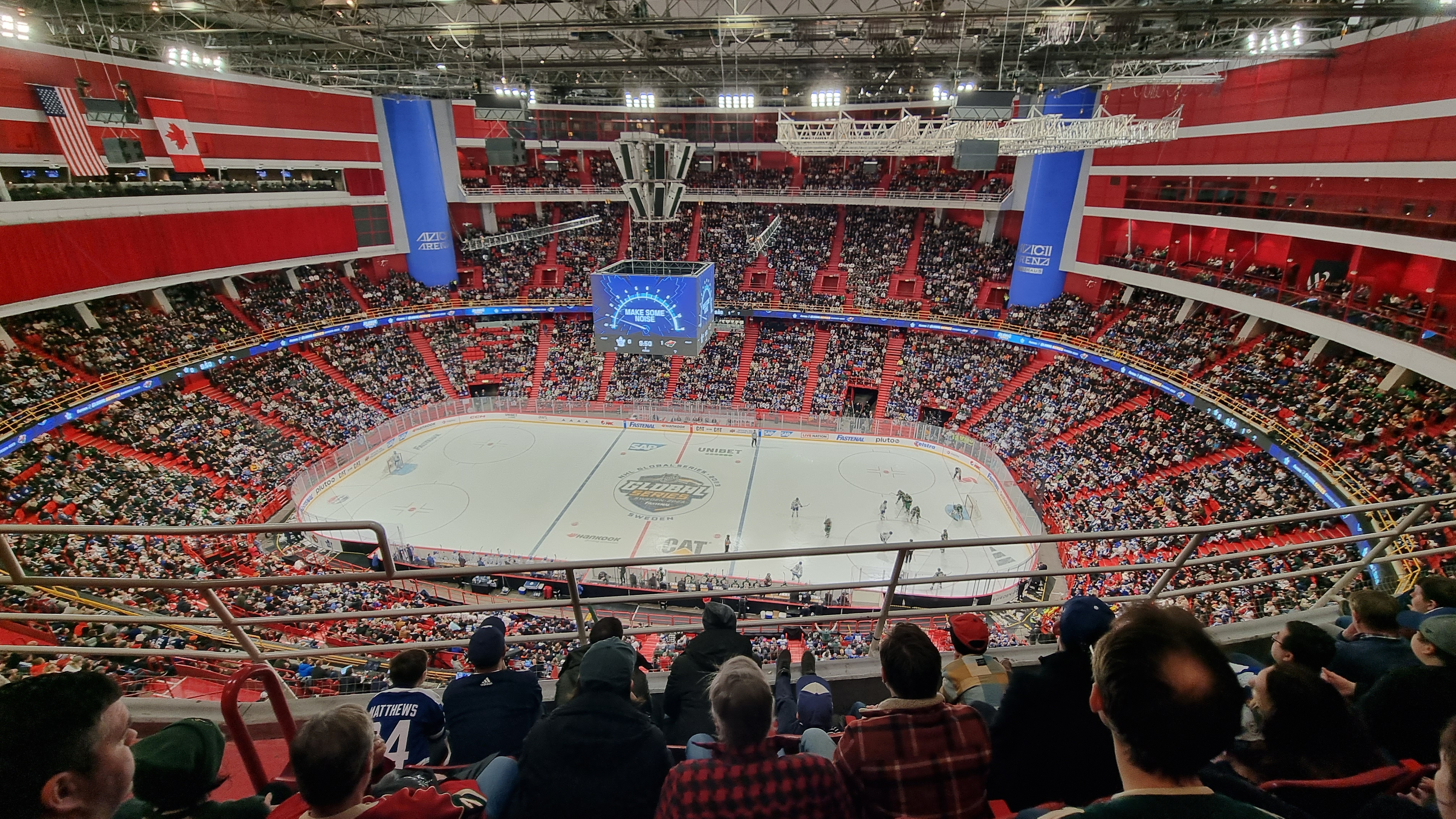
Globen hosting the NHL Global Series event in 2023

The Globe is primarily used for ice hockey, and is the former home arena of AIK, Djurgårdens IF, and Hammarby IF. It is also used for concerts and sports such as futsal (indoor football). The third team to play a home game in their league was Huddinge IK (three home games there, all in 1993), followed by Hammarby IF (20 home games in Globen so far) and AC Camelen (one game in 1998, in the sixth level league, with 92 spectators).

The first international game played in Globen was between Hammarby IF (Sweden) and Jokerit (Finland) a couple of weeks before the grand opening, although the players were only 12 years old at the time (born 1977) and it was a friendly game.

The arena hosted the final of Sveriges Television's yearly music competition Melodifestivalen, Sweden's qualifier show for the Eurovision Song Contest, until 2012. The show returned to the arena for the first three heats of the 2022 competition.

It also hosted the Eurovision Song Contest in 2000 and 2016.

In March 2021, it hosted the 2021 World Figure Skating Championships despite the COVID-19 pandemic. In November 2021, it hosted the Counter-Strike: Global Offensive tournament PGL Major Stockholm 2021, which was named in the Guinness World Records for the most-watched Counter-Strike tournament.

Since the 2000 NHL Challenge, the National Hockey League has used the arena for occasional games, both in the preseason and the regular season. The most recent games at the arena were two regular-season games between the Buffalo Sabres and Tampa Bay Lightning in November 2019, part of the NHL Global Series event. The Global Series returned to Avicii Arena in November 2023, with the Senators returning and being joined by the Detroit Red Wings, Minnesota Wild, and Toronto Maple Leafs. Each team played two games during the event.

In 2027, the arena will host the group phase matches for the EuroBasket Women 2027.

== Concerts ==
Concerts at Avicii Arena
Date	Artist	Opening act	Tour	Attendance	Revenue
12 June 1989	Pink Floyd	—N/a	A Momentary Lapse of Reason Tour	N/A	
13 June 1989	Pink Floyd	—N/a	A Momentary Lapse of Reason Tour	N/A	
14 June 1989	Pink Floyd	—N/a	A Momentary Lapse of Reason Tour	N/A	
15 December 1989	Bon Jovi	Dan Reed Network	New Jersey Syndicate Tour	N/A	
21 August 1990	Whitesnake	Poison, The Quireboys	Monsters of Rock Sweden 1990	N/A	
6 October 1990	Depeche Mode	—N/a	World Violation Tour	N/A	
16 August 1991	Guns 'n Roses	Skid Row	Use Your Illusion Tour	N/A	
17 August 1991	Guns 'n Roses	Skid Row	Use Your Illusion Tour	N/A	
20 September 1991	Roxette	Glass Tiger	Join the Joyride! Tour	N/A	
21 September 1991	Roxette	Glass Tiger	Join the Joyride! Tour	N/A	
22 September 1991	Roxette	Glass Tiger	Join the Joyride! Tour	N/A	
10 June 1992	U2	Fatima Mansions	Zoo TV Tour	N/A	
11 June 1992	U2	Fatima Mansions	Zoo TV Tour	N/A	
18 December 1992	Metallica	—N/a	Wherever We May Roam Tour	N/A	
13 April 1993	Peter Gabriel	Ayub Ogada	Secret World Tour	N/A	
9 September 1994	Roxette	Brainpool	Crash! Boom! Bang! Tour	N/A	
3 December 1994	ZZ Top	Ian Moore	Antenna World Tour	N/A	
6 December 1996	Kiss	The Verve Pipe	Alive Worldwide Tour	N/A	
25 April 1997	The Who		Quadrophenia Tour	N/A	
9 September 1997	Oasis	—N/a	Be Here Now Tour	N/A	
19 May 1998	Spice Girls	—N/a	Spiceworld Tour	N/A	
20 May 1998	Spice Girls	—N/a	Spiceworld Tour	N/A	
6 February 1999	The Corrs	Bable Fish	Talk on Corners World Tour	N/A	
10 June 1999	Aerosmith	The Black Crowes	Nine Lives Tour	N/A	
14 December 1999	Black Sabbath	Godsmack, Drain STH	—N/a	N/A	
13 May 2000	Eurovision Song Contest 2000	-		N/A	
9 November 2000	Britney Spears	—N/a	Oops!... I Did It Again Tour		
18 November 2000	The Corrs	Picturehouse	In Blue Tour		
13 January 2001	Googoosh		Comeback World Tour		
23 April 2001	Westlife		Where Dreams Come True Tour		
9 July 2001	U2	Stereophonics	Elevation Tour	31,511	$1,269,775
10 July 2001	U2	Stereophonics	Elevation Tour	31,511	$1,269,775
16 November 2001	Roxette	The Rasmus	Room Service Tour	N/A	
28 May 2002	Destiny's Child	Play; Solange Knowles	Destiny's Child World Tour	N/A	
10 April 2003	Shakira	—N/a	Tour of the Mongoose	N/A	
24 April 2003	Peter Gabriel		Growing Up Tour	N/A	
11 May 2004	Britney Spears	Skye Sweetnam, JC Chasez, Wicked Wisdom	The Onyx Hotel Tour	13,635 / 14,045	$686,102
17 May 2005	Destiny's Child	—N/a	Destiny Fulfilled... and Lovin' It		
22 June 2005	Avril Lavigne	Simple Plan, Melody Club	Bonez Tour	N/A	
12 March 2007	Shakira	—N/a	Oral Fixation Tour	N/A	
16 March 2007	Dolly Parton	—N/a	An Evening with Dolly Parton	N/A	
3 May 2007	Beyoncé	Lemar	The Beyoncé Experience	N/A	
25 May 2007	Linkin Park		Minutes to Midnight World Tour		
19 June 2007	Justin Timberlake		FutureSex/LoveShow		
6 July 2007	The Who		Endless Wire Tour	7,500	
7 June 2008	Céline Dion	Calasia	Taking Chances World Tour	14,817 / 14,817	$2,428,840
11 June 2008	Kylie Minogue	—N/a	KylieX2008		
28 June 2008	Avril Lavigne	Jonas Brothers	The Best Damn World Tour		
17 September 2008	Coldplay	High Wire	Viva la Vida Tour	28,043 / 28,510	$1,873,058
18 September 2008	Coldplay	High Wire	Viva la Vida Tour	28,043 / 28,510	$1,873,058
28 January 2009	Oasis	Caesars	Dig Out Your Soul Tour		
7 March 2009	Metallica	—N/a	World Magnetic Tour	—N/a	$2,111,922
4 May 2009	Metallica	—N/a	World Magnetic Tour		$2,111,922
13 May 2009	Beyoncé	—N/a	I Am... World Tour	10,640 / 10,640	$707,602
13 July 2009	Britney Spears	DJ Havana Brown	The Circus Starring Britney Spears	23,022	$2,690,080
14 July 2009	Britney Spears	DJ Havana Brown	The Circus Starring Britney Spears	27,310	$2,690,080
11 October 2009	Green Day	Prima Donna	21st Century Breakdown World Tour	N/A	
10 November 2009	P!nk	Evermore	Funhouse Tour	N/A	
7 May 2010	Lady Gaga	Semi Precious Weapons	The Monster Ball Tour	N/A	
8 May 2010	Lady Gaga	Semi Precious Weapons	The Monster Ball Tour	N/A	
6 May 2011	Rush	—N/a	Time Machine Tour	5,637 / 10,764	$456,028
14 June 2011	Linkin Park	The Futureheads	A Thousand Suns World Tour		
27 August 2011	Dolly Parton	—N/a	Better Day World Tour	11,016 / 11,700	$1,163,080
16 October 2011	Britney Spears	Joe Jonas, Destinee & Paris	Femme Fatale Tour	N/A	
1 November 2011	Rihanna	Calvin Harris	Loud Tour	N/A	
3 November 2011	Roxette	—N/a	The Neverending World Tour	N/A	
4 November 2011	Bob Dylan	Mark Knopfler	Never Ending Tour	N/A	
10 December 2011	Paul McCartney	—N/a	On the Run	N/A	
18 April 2012	Michael Bublé	Naturally 7	Crazy Love Tour	N/A	
7 July 2012	Pearl Jam	X	Pearl Jam 2012 Tour		
30 August 2012	Lady Gaga	The Darkness, Lady Starlight	Born This Way Ball	27,477	$2,848,530
31 August 2012	Lady Gaga	The Darkness, Lady Starlight	Born This Way Ball	27,477	$2,848,530
22 April 2013	Justin Bieber	—N/a	Believe Tour	N/A	
23 April 2013	Justin Bieber	—N/a	Believe Tour	N/A	
24 April 2013	Justin Bieber	—N/a	Believe Tour	N/A	
26 May 2013	P!nk	Churchill	The Truth About Love Tour	14,975 / 14,975	$1,134,870
29 May 2013	Beyoncé	Luke James	The Mrs. Carter Show World Tour	13,934 / 13,934	$1,318,690
22 July 2013	Rihanna	GTA	Diamonds World Tour	13,929 / 13,929	$1,226,039
3 November 2013	Bruno Mars	Mayer Hawthorne	The Moonshine Jungle Tour	N/A	
23 February 2014	Michael Bublé	Naturally 7	To Be Loved Tour	N/A	
22 May 2014	Peter Gabriel	—N/a	Back to Front Tour	10,950	N/A
30 May 2014	Miley Cyrus	Sky Ferreira	Bangerz Tour	N/A	
12 June 2014	John Mayer	Phillip Phillips	Born and Raised World Tour	N/A	
11 July 2014	Dolly Parton	—N/a	Blue Smoke World Tour	N/A	
30 September 2014	Lady Gaga	Lady Starlight	ArtRave: The Artpop Ball	N/A	
16 March 2015	Nicki Minaj	Trey Songz, Ester Dean	The Pinkprint Tour	4,894 / 8,522	$348,272
22 March 2015	Katy Perry	Charli XCX	Prismatic World Tour	N/A	
21 May 2015	Ariana Grande	Rixton	The Honeymoon Tour	N/A	
16 September 2015	U2	—N/a	Innocence + Experience Tour	62,716 / 62,716	$6,850,151
17 September 2015	U2	—N/a	Innocence + Experience Tour	62,716 / 62,716	$6,850,151
20 September 2015	U2	—N/a	Innocence + Experience Tour	62,716 / 62,716	$6,850,151
21 September 2015	U2	—N/a	Innocence + Experience Tour	62,716 / 62,716	$6,850,151
3 March 2016	Ellie Goulding	Sarah Hartman	Delirium World Tour	4,900 / 13,649	—N/a
10 May 2016	Eurovision Song Contest 2016	Heroes by Måns Zelmerlöw	_		
12 May 2016	Eurovision Song Contest 2016	That's Eurovision	_		
14 May 2016	Eurovision Song Contest 2016	Flag Parade	_		
27 January 2017	Green Day	Catfish and the Bottlemen	Revolution Radio Tour		
4 March 2017	Drake	dvsn	Boy Meets World Tour	13,838	$989,625
30 March 2017	Ed Sheeran	Anne-Marie, Ryan McMullan	÷ Tour	14,024 / 14,260	$1,003,630
7 May 2017	John Mayer	Andreas Moe	The Search for Everything World Tour	12,306 / 12,726	$919,463
17 May 2017	Shawn Mendes	James TW	Illuminate World Tour	11,342 / 11,342	$624,676
20 May 2017	Bruno Mars	Anderson Paak	24K Magic World Tour	14,688 / 14,688	$939,321
3 March 2018	Kendrick Lamar	James Blake	The Damn Tour	14,064 / 14,064	$1,290,910
18 March 2018	Harry Styles	Mabel	Harry Styles: Live on Tour	8,578 / 8,578	$711,071
29 April 2018	Bryan Adams	—N/a	Ultimate Tour		
5 May 2018	Metallica	Kvelertak	WorldWired Tour	32,990 / 32,990	$2,903,553
7 May 2018	Metallica	Kvelertak	WorldWired Tour	32,990 / 32,990	$2,903,553
10 June 2018	Katy Perry	Tove Styrke	Witness: The Tour		
8 February 2019	Twenty One Pilots	The Regrettes	The Bandito Tour	N/A	
4 March 2019	Nicki Minaj	Lil Xan	The Nicki Wrld Tour	N/A	
4 March 2019	Juice Wrld	Lil Xan	The Nicki Wrld Tour		
15 March 2019	Shawn Mendes	Alessia Cara	Shawn Mendes: The Tour	12,174 / 12,174	$712,062
21 May 2019	Mumford & Sons	Gang of Youths	Delta Tour		
2 June 2019	Backstreet Boys	KnowleDJ	DNA World Tour	13,698 / 13,698	$953,136
26 June 2019	Bob Dylan	—N/a	Never Ending Tour	N/A	
1 October 2019	John Mayer	—N/a	I Guess I Just Feel Like World Tour	N/A	
7 October 2019	Ariana Grande	Ella Mai, Social House	Sweetener World Tour	13,831 / 13,831	$1,264,240
23 October 2019	Michael Bublé	Naturally 7	An Evening with Michael Bublé	N/A	
11 December 2019	A$AP Rocky	Playboi Carti, Ski Mask the Slump God, Comethazine	Injured Generation Tour	N/A	
15 June 2022	Pet Shop Boys	—N/a	Dreamworld Tour	N/A	
10 October 2022	The Cure	The Twilight Sad	Lost World Tour	N/A	
17 October 2022	Kendrick Lamar	Baby Keem, Tanna Leone	The Big Steppers Tour	N/A	
3 December 2022	Burna Boy	Kaliffa	Love damini Tour	N/A	
1 March 2023	Robbie Williams	—N/a	XXV Tour		
28 April 2023	Sabaton	Lordi; Babymetal	The Tour To End All Tours		
6 May 2023	Eros Ramazzotti	—N/a	Batitto Infinito		
31 May 2023	Peter Gabriel	—N/a	i/o The Tour		
7 October 2023	50 Cent	Busta Rhymes	The Final Lap Tour		
1 February 2025	Kite	—N/a	Kite on Ice		
18 February 2025	Teddy Swims		I've Tried Everything but Therapy		
1 March 2025	Yung Lean				
15 March 2025	Thåström				
3 April 2025	Sabrina Carpenter	Rachel Chinouriri	Short n' Sweet Tour		
4 April 2025	Sabrina Carpenter	Rachel Chinouriri	Short n' Sweet Tour		
5 April 2025	Daniel Adams Ray, Blåsarsymfonikerna				
11 April 2025	Viktor Norén, Sarah Dawn Finer, Dotter, Anton Ewald		We will Rock You		
12 April 2025	Viktor Norén, Sarah Dawn Finer, Dotter, Anton Ewald		We will Rock You		
23 April 2025	Billie Eilish	Tom Odell	Hit Me Hard and Soft: The Tour		
24 April 2025	Billie Eilish	Tom Odell	Hit Me Hard and Soft: The Tour		
29 May 2025	Pernilla Wahlgren		Pernilla Wahlgren - Kort, glad och Tacksam		
30 May 2025	Pernilla Wahlgren		Pernilla Wahlgren har hybris		
31 May 2025	Pernilla Wahlgren		Pernilla Wahlgrens Happy Ending		
1 June 2025	Tate McRae	Benee	Miss Possessive Tour		
14 June 2025	André Rieu				
25 June 2025	Kylie Minogue	Jodie Harsh	Tension Tour		
29 June 2025	Pitbull		Party After Dark Tour		
13 September 2025	Ronny & Ragge		En jääla arenashow Fan!		
12 October 2025	Lady Gaga		The Mayhem Ball		
13 October 2025	Lady Gaga		The Mayhem Ball		
15 October 2025	Lady Gaga		The Mayhem Ball		
31 October 2025	OneRepublic		Escape To Europe Tour		
6 November 2025	Mumford & Sons		2025 UK + EU Tour		
26 November 2025	Viagra Boys		The Sphere Stockholm!		
29 November 2025	Ola Salo & Peter Jöback		A Show Extravaganza!		
15 January 2026	Burna Boy		No Sign of Weakness Tour		
31 January 2026	Soppgirobygget		Viva la Tour - Final Part		
7 February 2026	RAYE		This Tour May Contain New Music		
17 February 2026	Dave		The Boy Who Played the Harp Tour		
8 March 2026	Hans Zimmer		The Next Level		
13 March 2026	Håkan Hellström		Håkan Hellström 2026		
14 March 2026	Håkan Hellström		Håkan Hellström 2026		
20 March 2026	Molly Sandèn		Molly Sandèn		
28 March 2026	Måns Möller		Min Perfekta Final		
29 March 2026	Louis Tomlinson		How Did We Get Here? World Tour		
20 April 2026	Matt Rife		Stay Golden Tour		
26 April 2026	Tame Impala	RIP Magic	Deadbeat Tour		
15 November 2026	The Prodigy	Cockhouse			
8 April 2027	Rush		Fifty Something Tour		

== Artwork ==
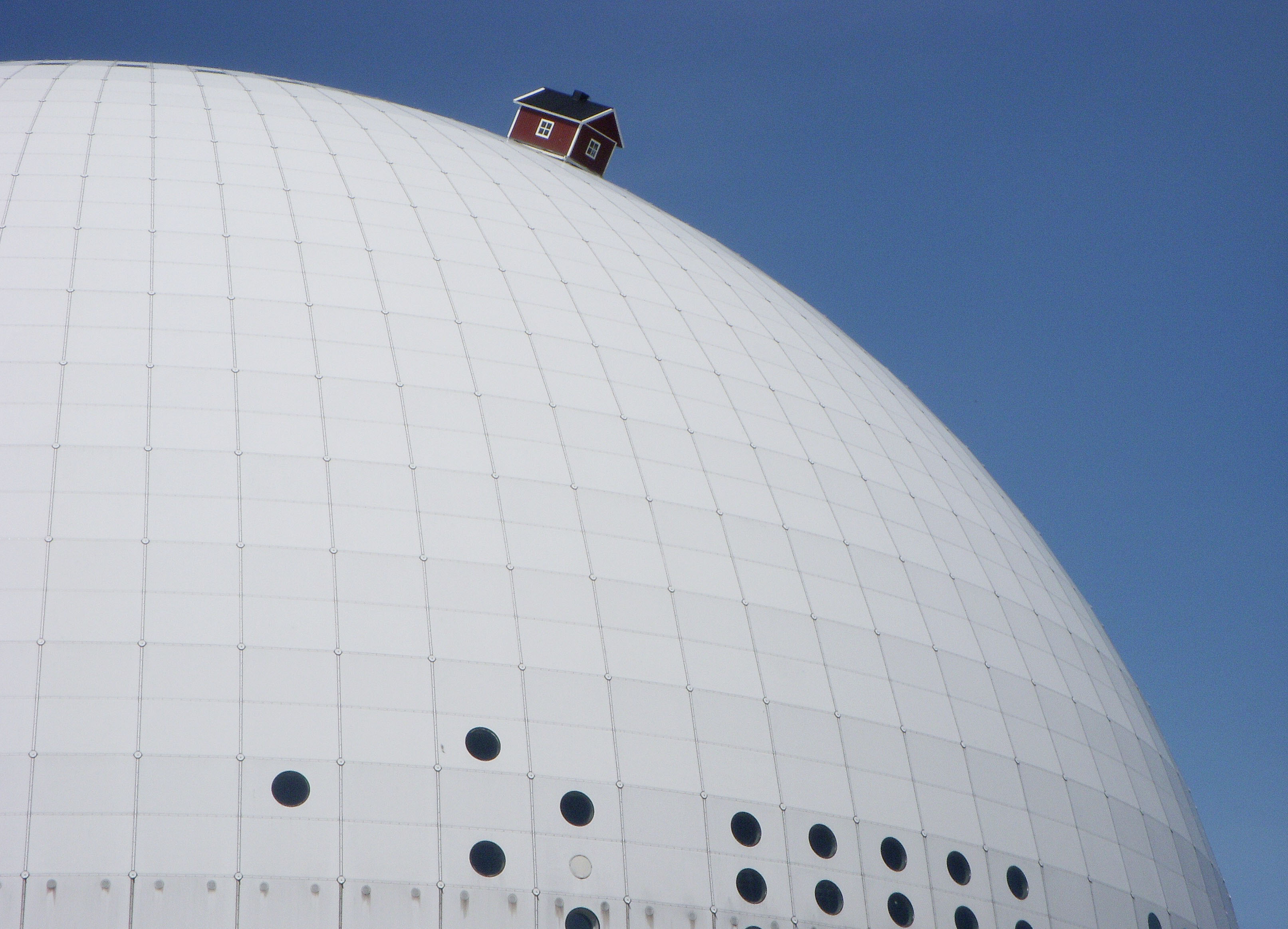
A small cottage bolted to the top of the Globe

A small cottage in aluminum with a 12-square-metre (130 sq ft) base was placed upon the Globe on 26 May 2009. The artist, Mikael Genberg, intended it to illustrate two important symbols for Sweden: the high-technology Globe building and the traditional, simple small countryside cottage in Falu red with white trim. The house was positioned some distance from the exact top position of the Globe. Genberg also hoped to eventually place a similar cottage on the Moon, which has not yet happened. The cottage remained on the Globe until October 2009.

== Skyview ==
Opened in February 2010, Skyview is an exterior inclined elevator which transports visitors to the top of the arena for a virtually unobstructed view of Stockholm. It has two spherical gondolas, each able to accommodate up to 12 passengers, which travel along parallel tracks on the exterior of the south side of the globe.

== See also ==
- Architecture of Stockholm
- Hovet
- 3Arena
- Sphere
- List of indoor arenas in Nordic countries
- List of European ice hockey arenas

Events and tenants
Preceded by Wiener Stadthalle; Vienna	Ice Hockey World Championships; Final Venue; 1989	Succeeded by Eisstadion Allmend; Bern
Preceded by Malmö City Theatre; Malmö	Melodifestivalen; Final Venue; 1989	Succeeded by Rondo; Gothenburg
Preceded by Flanders Expo; Ghent	European Volleyball Championship; Final Venue; 1989	Succeeded by Deutschlandhalle; Berlin
Preceded by Mediolanum Forum; Milan	Ice Hockey World Championships; Final Venue; 1995	Succeeded by Wiener Stadthalle; Vienna
Preceded by Palais omnisports de Paris-Bercy; Paris	European Indoor Championships in Athletics; Venue; 1996	Succeeded by Palau Velódrom Lluís Puig; Valencia
Preceded by International Convention Center; Jerusalem	Eurovision Song Contest; Venue; 2000	Succeeded by Parken Stadium; Copenhagen
Preceded by Malmö Opera and Music Theatre; Malmö	Melodifestivalen; Final Venue; 2002 – 2012	Succeeded by Friends Arena; Solna
Preceded by Dom Sportova; Zagreb	European Men's Handball Championship; Final Venue; 2002	Succeeded by Tivoli Hall; Ljubljana
Preceded by Abdi İpekçi Arena; Istanbul	FIBA EuroBasket; Final Venue; 2003	Succeeded by Belgrade Arena; Belgrade
Preceded by Hartwall Areena; Helsinki	Ice Hockey World Championships; Final Venue; 2013	Succeeded by Minsk-Arena; Minsk
Preceded by Wiener Stadthalle; Vienna	Eurovision Song Contest; Venue; 2016	Succeeded by International Exhibition Centre; Kyiv
