= Blue Smoke World Tour =

2014 concert tour by Dolly Parton

- Tour by Dolly Parton
- Promotional poster for 2014 tour
- Associated album: Blue Smoke
- Start date: January 24, 2014
- End date: July 14, 2014
- Legs: 4
- No. of shows: 11 in North America; 13 in Australia; 23 in Europe; 47 total

Dolly Parton concert chronology
- Better Day World Tour (2011); Blue Smoke World Tour (2014); Pure & Simple Tour (2016)

The Blue Smoke World Tour is the eleventh concert tour by American recording artist Dolly Parton. The tour promotes Parton's 42nd studio album, Blue Smoke. Beginning in January 2014, the tour played forty-seven shows in North America, Oceania, and Europe. On Pollstar's Mid Year Top 100 Worldwide Tours list, released in July 2014 and ranking tours up until that date, the Blue Smoke World Tour ranked at number 23 with $23.3 million in grosses and 210,288 tickets sold for 38 shows.

== Background ==
Parton mentioned working on a new album in July 2013. A month later, news of a tour hit multiple media outlets, as the singer was promoting the expansion of her theme park, Dollywood. The tour was officially announced on The Queen Latifah Show in October 21, 2013. She also performed a new song, "Miss You, Miss Me" along with performing a "rap" that went viral. Parton initially revealed dates only in Australia. Along with the announcement, the singer posted a message to her Australian fans on her official website. It stated:

"Australia, here I come again. We have a lot of new and exciting things for the show and can’t wait to share it with you. I love my fans in that part of the world. You've been so very good to me for so many years and I know that we're gonna have a wonderful time. It's a long way from home in your part of the world, but I always feel like I'm right at home. So Australia, I'm coming home. Wait up!"

The tour will serve as the main promotional vehicle behind her forthcoming album, Blue Smoke. Shortly after the announcement, additional shows were revealed in Europe, specifically the United Kingdom, Ireland, Scandinavia and Germany. With the release of European shows, Parton remarked:

"Every time I come to Europe, I'm just as excited as I was my very first time, which was many, many years ago. I love that part of the [W]orld and I especially love the fans. We always have such a good time and I've put together a lot of things for this show that I think the fans will love. We had not planned to come back so soon, but we got so much fan mail and such a great reaction that I thought, 'Well, why not. If they’re having a good time and we always do, let's just do it'".

The scheduling of the shows also sparked rumors the singer would perform at the Glastonbury Festival. Parton's participation in the festival was confirmed on June 1, 2014. She expressed her excitement, stating she's wanted to perform at the festival for many years. Before she hit the stage, she was honored by the RIAA with a plaque commemorating 100 million albums sold worldwide. The performance was a success, with BBC News reporting Parton drew the biggest crowd of the festival. Despite bad weather and mud, she performed at the Pyramid Stage in an all white catsuit. She performed an abbreviated setlist from the current runs; which featured a guest appearance by famed guitarist Richie Sambora on "Lay Your Hands On Me".

Despite the high praise, the festival appearance was shadowed by allegations of lip-synching. Sky News reporter, Kay Burley, tweeted her in disappointment with Parton for miming a huge event. This created an uproar on the Internet. Dolly responded to the chaos stating she was not miming. She continued to say "My boobs are fake, my hair's fake but what is real is my voice and my heart".

The news came alongside media reports of Parton in a car accident. Parton described the incident as a fender-bender and that she sustained no injuries. While touring in Australia, the singer will also launch her program Imagination Library in that region. In November 2013, show in California, Nevada and Arizona were revealed. Initially believed to be one-off shows, Parton stated the shows will kick off the 2014 tour. She further stated:

"It's always great to perform at home in the good ol' U.S.A. We’re kicking off our Blue Smoke World Tour right here at home. I love traveling all over the world; but it's true, there's nothing like home".

It was also reported additional shows in the U.S. (and possibly Canada) will take place in May 2014.

== Set list ==
The following songs were performed during the January 28, 2014 concert at the Comerica Theatre in Phoenix, Arizona. It does not represent all concerts during the tour.

1. "Baby I'm Burnin'" / "Girl On Fire
2. "Why'd You Come in Here Lookin' Like That"
3. "Jolene"
4. "Blue Smoke"
5. "Don't Think Twice"
6. "My Tennessee Mountain Home"
7. "(Give Me That) Old-Time Religion" / "I'll Fly Away" / "I’m on My Way to Canaan's Land"
8. "Coat of Many Colors"
9. "Smoky Mountain Memories"
10. "Rocky Top"
11. "Together You and I"
12. "Lay Your Hands on Me"
13. "Two Doors Down"
14. "Better Get to Livin'"
15. "Lover du Jour"
16. "Banks of the Ohio"
17. "Little Sparrow"
18. "Travelin' Prayer"
19. "Shine"
20. "It's All Wrong, But It's All Right" / "The Bargain Store"
21. "Love Is Like a Butterfly"
22. "Old Flames Can't Hold a Candle to You"
23. "But You Know I Love You"
24. "Real Love" / "Think About Love"
25. "Here You Come Again"
26. "Islands in the Stream"
27. "9 to 5"

Encore

28. "I Will Always Love You"

== Tour dates ==
Date	City	Country	Venue
North America
January 24, 2014	Rancho Mirage	United States	The Show
January 25, 2014	Primm	United States	Star of the Desert Arena
January 26, 2014	Reno	United States	Reno Events Center
January 28, 2014	Phoenix	United States	Comerica Theatre
Oceania
February 7, 2014	Auckland	New Zealand	Vector Arena
February 8, 2014	Auckland	New Zealand	Vector Arena
February 11, 2014	Melbourne	Australia	Rod Laver Arena
February 12, 2014	Melbourne	Australia	Rod Laver Arena
February 13, 2014 (Note: Originally set to take place on February 25, 2014.)	Adelaide	Australia	Adelaide Entertainment Centre
February 15, 2014	Pokolbin	Australia	Hope Estate Winery Amphitheatre
February 16, 2014	Tamworth	Australia	Tamworth Regional Entertainment Centre
February 18, 2014	Sydney	Australia	Qantas Credit Union Arena
February 19, 2014	Sydney	Australia	Qantas Credit Union Arena
February 21, 2014	Brisbane	Australia	Brisbane Entertainment Centre
February 22, 2014	Brisbane	Australia	Brisbane Entertainment Centre
February 24, 2014	Cairns	Australia	Cairns Convention Centre
February 27, 2014	Perth	Australia	Perth Arena
North America
May 22, 2014	Catoosa	United States	The Joint
May 23, 2014	Catoosa	United States	The Joint
May 25, 2014	Cherokee	United States	Harrah's Cherokee Event Center
May 27, 2014 (Note: Part of Evening Among Friends)	Richmond	United States	EKU Center for the Arts
May 28, 2014 (Note: Part of a benefit concert for the Imagination Library & The Robert F. Thomas Foundation)	Knoxville	United States	Thompson–Boling Arena
May 30, 2014	Thackerville	United States	Global Event Center
May 31, 2014	Thackerville	United States	Global Event Center
Europe
June 8, 2014	Liverpool	United Kingdom	Echo Arena Liverpool
June 10, 2014	Belfast	Ireland	Odyssey Arena
June 11, 2014	Dublin	Ireland	The O_{2}
June 12, 2014 (Note: Part of Live at the Marquee)	Cork	Ireland	The Docklands
June 14, 2014	Newcastle	United Kingdom	Metro Radio Arena
June 15, 2014	Aberdeen	United Kingdom	GE Oil and Gas Arena
June 17, 2014	Glasgow	United Kingdom	SSE Hydro
June 18, 2014	Glasgow	United Kingdom	SSE Hydro
June 20, 2014	Leeds	United Kingdom	First Direct Arena
June 21, 2014	Manchester	United Kingdom	Phones 4u Arena
June 22, 2014	Birmingham	United Kingdom	LG Arena
June 24, 2014	Cardiff	United Kingdom	Motorpoint Arena Cardiff
June 25, 2014	Cardiff	United Kingdom	Motorpoint Arena Cardiff
June 27, 2014	London	United Kingdom	The O_{2} Arena
June 28, 2014	London	United Kingdom	The O_{2} Arena
June 29, 2014 (Note: Part of Glastonbury Festival)	Pilton	United Kingdom	Worthy Farm
July 2, 2014	Nottingham	United Kingdom	Capital FM Arena Nottingham
July 5, 2014	Cologne	Germany	Lanxess Arena
July 6, 2014	Berlin	Germany	O_{2} World
July 8, 2014	Copenhagen	Denmark	Forum Copenhagen
July 9, 2014	Oslo	Norway	Oslo Spektrum
July 11, 2014	Stockholm	Sweden	Ericsson Globe
July 14, 2014^{[E]} (Note: Part of Moon and Stars)	Locarno	Switzerland	Piazza Grande

=== Box office score data ===
Venue	City	Tickets sold / available	Gross revenue
Brisbane Entertainment Centre	Brisbane	13,842 / 18,060 (77%)	$1,765,110
Perth Arena	Perth	10,833 / 12,642 (86%)	$1,234,000
Rod Laver Arena	Melbourne	15,281 / 16,000 (95%)	$1,904,070
Qantas Credit Union Arena	Sydney	12,368 / 13,390 (92%)	$1,418,070
Thompson-Boling Arena	Knoxville	8,654 / 8,803 (98%)	$452,443
O2 Arena	London	27,627 / 31,180 (89%)	$3,375,110
O2 World	Berlin	6,370 / 6,986 (91%)	$513,182
TOTAL		94,975 / 107,061 (89%)	$10,661,985
