= Please Don't Stop Loving Me =

Single by Porter Wagoner and Dolly Parton

from the album Porter 'n' Dolly
- B-side: "Sounds of Nature"
- Released: July 1974
- Genre: Country
- Label: RCA Records
- Songwriter(s): Porter Wagoner; Dolly Parton
- Producer(s): Bob Ferguson

Porter Wagoner and Dolly Parton singles chronology
"If Teardrops Were Pennies" (1973)	"Please Don't Stop Loving Me" (1974)	"Say Forever You'll Be Mine" (1975)

"Please Don't Stop Loving Me" is a song written and recorded as a duet by American country music artists Porter Wagoner and Dolly Parton. It was released in July 1974 as the first single from the album Porter 'n' Dolly. "Please Don't Stop Loving Me" was Porter Wagoner and Dolly Parton's sixteenth country hit and their only number one on the country chart as a duet act. Though Parton and Wagoner had each topped the charts as solo artists, and many of their duet singles had reached the country top-ten, "Please Don't Stop Loving Me" was their only chart-topper as a duet act. The single stayed at number one for one week and spent a total of ten weeks on the country chart.

== Chart performance ==
Chart (1974)	Peak position
U.S. Billboard Hot Country Singles	1
Canadian RPM Country Tracks	45
