= Joyful Noise (soundtrack) =

Soundtrack of the 2012 film Joyful Noise

Soundtrack album by various artists
- Released: January 10, 2012
- Recorded: 2011
- Genre: R&B; pop rock; gospel; country
- Length: 47:32
- Label: WaterTower Music
- Producer: Mervyn Warren

Dolly Parton chronology
Better Day (2011)	Joyful Noise (2012)	Blue Smoke (2014)

Singles from Joyful Noise
- 1. "He's Everything" Released: October 28, 2011; 2. "From Here to the Moon and Back" Released: July 6, 2012

Joyful Noise is the soundtrack album to the 2012 film of the same name, starring Queen Latifah and Dolly Parton. The soundtrack was released on January 10, 2012, by WaterTower Music and contains three original compositions by Parton. The soundtrack produced two singles; "He's Everything" and "From Here to the Moon and Back".

Professional ratings
Review scores
Source	Rating
AllMusic	3/5 stars

== Track listing ==
No.	Title	Writer(s)	Performer(s)	Length
1.	"Not Enough"	Dolly Parton	Dolly Parton and Queen Latifah	4:30
2.	"Man in the Mirror"	Glen Ballard; Siedah Garrett	Keke Palmer	4:24
3.	"Maybe I'm Amazed"	Paul McCartney	Jeremy Jordan and Keke Palmer	3:17
4.	"In Love"	Kirk Franklin	Kirk Franklin	4:30
5.	"Fix Me, Jesus"	Traditional	Queen Latifah	3:05
6.	"From Here to the Moon and Back"	Parton	Dolly Parton, Kris Kristofferson and Jeremy Jordan	4:24
7.	"I'm Yours"	Mervyn Warren	Keke Palmer, DeQuina Moore and Angela Grovey	3:18
8.	"Mighty High"	David Crawford; Richard Downing	Karen Peck	3:06
9.	"That's the Way God Planned It"	Billy Preston	Ivan Kelley, Jr.	3:45
10.	"Higher Medley: I Want to Take You Higher / Forever / Yeah! / Signed, Sealed, Delivered I'm Yours"	Sylvester Stewart; Chris Brown; Jamal Jones; Brian Kennedy; Andre Merritt; Rob Allen; Christopher Bridges; James Phillips; Jonathan Smith; LaMarquis Jefferson; Patrick Smith; Sean Garrett; Stevie Wonder; Lee Garrett; Syreeta Wright; Lula Mae Hardaway	Queen Latifah, Dolly Parton, Keke Palmer, Jeremy Jordan, Andy Karl, Angela Grovey, and DeQuina Moore	5:32
11.	"He's Everything"	Parton	Queen Latifah, Dolly Parton, Keke Palmer, Jeremy Jordan, Andy Karl and DeQuina Moore	4:37
12.	"Joyful Noise Suite"	Warren	Mervyn Warren	2:44

Additionally, the songs "Letters from the 9th Ward / Walk Away Renée" by Rickie Lee Jones, "On My Phone" by Jack Miz, and "My Friend the Sun" by Peter Holsapple and Chris Stamey appear in the film but do not appear on the soundtrack album.

== Charts ==
=== Weekly charts ===
Chart (2012)	Peak position
UK Compilation Albums (OCC)	95
US Billboard 200	12
US Top Christian Albums (Billboard)	1
US Top Gospel Albums (Billboard)	1
US Soundtrack Albums (Billboard)	1

=== Year-end charts ===
Chart (2012)	Position
US Christian Albums (Billboard)	15
US Top Gospel Albums (Billboard)	7
US Soundtrack Albums (Billboard)	25

Chart (2013)	Position
US Top Gospel Albums (Billboard)	31

Singles

Title	Year	Peak chart positions	
Title	Year	US Christian Digital Sales	US Gospel Digital Sales
"He's Everything"	2011	—	15
"From Here to the Moon and Back"	2012	2	2

Other charted songs

Title	Year	Peak chart positions	
Title	Year	US Christian Digital Sales	US Gospel Digital Sales
"Man in the Mirror"	2012	7	2
"Maybe I'm Amazed"	2012	19	3
"Fix Me, Jesus"	2012	—	19
"That's the Way God Planned It"	2012	—	12
"Higher Medley"	2012	4	1
