= To Be Loved Tour =

2013–2015 concert tour by Michael Bublé

- World tour by Michael Bublé
- Location: Africa; Asia; Europe; North America; Oceania; South America
- Associated album: To Be Loved
- Start date: 30 June 2013
- End date: 22 March 2015
- Legs: 9
- No. of shows: 172
- Box office: $173.6 million

Michael Bublé concert chronology
- Crazy Love Tour (2010–12); To Be Loved Tour (2013–15); An Evening with Michael Bublé (2019–22)

To Be Loved Tour was the fifth concert tour by Canadian singer Michael Bublé. Launched in support of his eighth studio album, To Be Loved (2013), the tour began on June 30, 2013, with a series of ten concerts at The O_{2} Arena in London and ended on March 22, 2015 in Johannesburg.

== Opening act ==
- Naturally 7

== Setlist ==
1. "Fever"
2. "Haven't Met You Yet"
3. "Try a Little Tenderness"
4. "You Make Me Feel So Young"
5. "Moondance"
6. "Come Dance with Me"
7. "Feeling Good"
8. Instrumental (Team Buble)
9. "I've Got the World on a String"
10. "Everything"
11. "That's All"
12. "Close Your Eyes"
13. "How Can You Mend a Broken Heart"
14. "Home"
15. "Get Lucky"
16. "Who's Lovin' You" (performed with Naturally 7)
17. "I Want You Back" (performed with Naturally 7) (A cappella)
18. "To Love Somebody" (performed with Naturally 7)
19. "All You Need is Love"
20. "Burning Love"
21. "It's a Beautiful Day"

Encore:

22. "Cry Me a River"
23. "Save the Last Dance for Me"
24. "A Song for You"

== Tour dates ==
=== 2013 ===
List of UK/Ireland concerts
Date	City	Country	Venue	Attendance	Revenue
30 June 2013	London	England	The O_{2} Arena	155,608 / 159,580	$16,003,100
1 July 2013	London	England	The O_{2} Arena	155,608 / 159,580	$16,003,100
3 July 2013	London	England	The O_{2} Arena	155,608 / 159,580	$16,003,100
4 July 2013	London	England	The O_{2} Arena	155,608 / 159,580	$16,003,100
5 July 2013	London	England	The O_{2} Arena	155,608 / 159,580	$16,003,100
7 July 2013	London	England	The O_{2} Arena	155,608 / 159,580	$16,003,100
8 July 2013	London	England	The O_{2} Arena	155,608 / 159,580	$16,003,100
10 July 2013	London	England	The O_{2} Arena	155,608 / 159,580	$16,003,100
12 July 2013	London	England	The O_{2} Arena	155,608 / 159,580	$16,003,100
13 July 2013	London	England	The O_{2} Arena	155,608 / 159,580	$16,003,100
15 July 2013	Dublin	Ireland	The O_{2}	—N/a	—N/a
16 July 2013	Dublin	Ireland	The O_{2}	—N/a	—N/a
18 July 2013	Dublin	Ireland	The O_{2}	—N/a	—N/a
19 July 2013	Dublin	Ireland	The O_{2}	—N/a	—N/a
20 July 2013	Dublin	Ireland	The O_{2}	—N/a	—N/a

List of U.S. concerts
Date	City	Country	Venue	Attendance	Revenue
7 September 2013	Chicago	United States	United Center	12,880 / 12,880	$1,269,095
8 September 2013	Kansas City	United States	Sprint Center	9,080 / 9,800	$681,596
11 September 2013	Saint Paul	United States	Xcel Energy Center	11,682 / 11,682	$938,411
13 September 2013	Lincoln	United States	Pinnacle Bank Arena	11,408 / 11,408	$943,139
14 September 2013	St. Louis	United States	Scottrade Center	10,800 / 10,800	$765,763
15 September 2013	Indianapolis	United States	Bankers Life Fieldhouse	10,000 / 10,000	$671,315
17 September 2013	Auburn Hills	United States	The Palace of Auburn Hills	10,177 / 11,000	$740,432
18 September 2013	Cleveland	United States	Quicken Loans Arena	9,220 / 10,400	$590,862
20 September 2013	Pittsburgh	United States	Consol Energy Center	11,477 / 11,477	$763,678
21 September 2013	Philadelphia	United States	Wells Fargo Center	11,992 / 11,992	$1,048,564
22 September 2013	Washington, D.C.	United States	Verizon Center	10,176 / 11,000	$954,275
24 September 2013	Buffalo	United States	First Niagara Center	10,905 / 10,905	$864,020
25 September 2013	Hartford	United States	XL Center	8,789 / 10,000	$560,164
27 September 2013	Boston	United States	TD Garden	11,505 / 11,505	$1,140,561
28 September 2013	Newark	United States	Prudential Center	11,866 / 11,866	$1,169,186
29 September 2013	Brooklyn	United States	Barclays Center	11,125 / 11,125	$1,101,611
18 October 2013	Dallas	United States	American Airlines Center	11,715 / 11,715	$1,139,018
19 October 2013	San Antonio	United States	AT&T Center	10,704 / 10,704	$887,372
20 October 2013	Houston	United States	Toyota Center	10,526 / 10,526	$1,004,891
22 October 2013	New Orleans	United States	New Orleans Arena	9,471 / 10,400	$754,008
23 October 2013	Nashville	United States	Bridgestone Arena	8,195 / 9,800	$652,053
25 October 2013	Raleigh	United States	PNC Arena	9,235 / 10,000	$659,192
26 October 2013	Charlotte	United States	Time Warner Cable Arena	9,203 / 10,200	$687,689
27 October 2013	Duluth	United States	The Arena at Gwinnett Center	9,638 / 9,638	$920,417
29 October 2013	Jacksonville	United States	Jacksonville Veterans Memorial Arena	8,320 / 9,000	$637,428
30 October 2013	Orlando	United States	Amway Center	10,900 / 10,900	$944,479
1 November 2013	Tampa	United States	Tampa Bay Times Forum	11,560 / 11,560	$1,013,164
2 November 2013	Sunrise	United States	BB&T Center	12,379 / 12,379	$1,176,357
15 November 2013	Seattle	United States	KeyArena	10,353 / 10,353	$913,553
16 November 2013	Portland	United States	Moda Center	7,569 / 7,569	$636,645
19 November 2013	Salt Lake City	United States	Energy Solutions Arena	8,571 / 8,571	$714,585
20 November 2013	Denver	United States	Pepsi Center	9,620 / 10,600	$629,408
22 November 2013	Phoenix	United States	US Airways Center	12,215 / 12,215	$1,005,443
23 November 2013	Las Vegas	United States	MGM Grand Garden Arena	12,474 / 12,474	$1,148,568
24 November 2013	Anaheim	United States	Honda Center	11,034 / 11,034	$1,067,969
26 November 2013	San Diego	United States	Valley View Casino Center	9,802 / 10,500	$763,091
29 November 2013	Los Angeles	United States	Staples Center	12,676 / 12,676	$1,213,320
30 November 2013	Oakland	United States	Oracle Arena	11,842 / 11,842	$973,825

=== 2014 ===
List of European concerts
Date	City	Country	Venue	Attendance	Revenue
11 January 2014	Paris	France	Palais Omnisports de Paris-Bercy	—N/a	—N/a
12 January 2014	Oberhausen	Germany	König Pilsener Arena	—N/a	—N/a
14 January 2014	Mannheim	Germany	SAP Arena	—N/a	—N/a
15 January 2014	Zürich	Switzerland	Hallenstadion	9,353 / 10,500	$1,314,570
16 January 2014	Munich	Germany	Olympiahalle	—N/a	—N/a
18 January 2014	Antwerp	Belgium	Sportpaleis	13,032 / 15,290	$1,236,830
19 January 2014	Amsterdam	Netherlands	Ziggo Dome	—N/a	—N/a
21 January 2014	Berlin	Germany	O_{2} World Berlin	10,162 / 11,704	$911,291
22 January 2014	Hamburg	Germany	O_{2} World Hamburg	9,423 / 11,504	$890,981
24 January 2014	Prague	Czech Republic	O_{2} Arena	—N/a	—N/a
25 January 2014	Vienna	Austria	Wiener Stadthalle	—N/a	—N/a
27 January 2014	Milan	Italy	Mediolanum Forum	24,000 / 24,000	$1,120,000
28 January 2014	Milan	Italy	Mediolanum Forum	24,000 / 24,000	$1,120,000
30 January 2014	Barcelona	Spain	Palau Sant Jordi	11,575 / 15,000	—N/a
31 January 2014	Madrid	Spain	Palacio de Deportes de la Comunidad	—N/a	—N/a
1 February 2014	Lisbon	Portugal	MEO Arena	—N/a	—N/a
2 February 2014	Lisbon	Portugal	MEO Arena	—N/a	—N/a
21 February 2014	Helsinki	Finland	Hartwall Arena	—N/a	—N/a
23 February 2014	Stockholm	Sweden	Ericsson Globe	—N/a	—N/a
24 February 2014	Oslo	Norway	Oslo Spektrum	—N/a	—N/a
26 February 2014	Copenhagen	Denmark	Forum Copenhagen	—N/a	—N/a
1 March 2014	Manchester	England	Phones 4U Arena	68,943 / 70,348	$7,832,270
2 March 2014	Manchester	England	Phones 4U Arena	68,943 / 70,348	$7,832,270
4 March 2014	Manchester	England	Phones 4U Arena	68,943 / 70,348	$7,832,270
5 March 2014	Manchester	England	Phones 4U Arena	68,943 / 70,348	$7,832,270
6 March 2014	Manchester	England	Phones 4U Arena	68,943 / 70,348	$7,832,270
8 March 2014	Glasgow	Scotland	SSE Hydro	—N/a	—N/a
9 March 2014	Glasgow	Scotland	SSE Hydro	—N/a	—N/a
10 March 2014	Glasgow	Scotland	SSE Hydro	—N/a	—N/a
12 March 2014	Birmingham	England	National Indoor Arena	—N/a	—N/a
13 March 2014	Birmingham	England	National Indoor Arena	—N/a	—N/a

List of Oceanic concerts
Date	City	Country	Venue	Attendance	Revenue
26 April 2014	Perth	Australia	Perth Arena	25,465 / 25,538	$3,082,230
27 April 2014	Perth	Australia	Perth Arena	25,465 / 25,538	$3,082,230
30 April 2014	Melbourne	Australia	Rod Laver Arena	41,784 / 41,784	$4,682,050
1 May 2014	Melbourne	Australia	Rod Laver Arena	41,784 / 41,784	$4,682,050
3 May 2014	Melbourne	Australia	Rod Laver Arena	41,784 / 41,784	$4,682,050
4 May 2014	Melbourne	Australia	Rod Laver Arena	41,784 / 41,784	$4,682,050
6 May 2014	Adelaide	Australia	Adelaide Entertainment Centre	14,775 / 14,775	$1,868,780
7 May 2014	Adelaide	Australia	Adelaide Entertainment Centre	14,775 / 14,775	$1,868,780
9 May 2014	Sydney	Australia	Allphones Arena	49,113 / 49,113 (Note: The score data is combined from the shows held at the Allphones Arena from 9–10 May and 16–17 May 2014, respectively.)	$6,242,990
10 May 2014	Sydney	Australia	Allphones Arena	49,113 / 49,113	$6,242,990
12 May 2014	Brisbane	Australia	Brisbane Entertainment Centre	17,871 / 17,871	$2,294,750
13 May 2014	Brisbane	Australia	Brisbane Entertainment Centre	17,871 / 17,871	$2,294,750
16 May 2014	Sydney	Australia	Allphones Arena	—	—
17 May 2014	Sydney	Australia	Allphones Arena	—	—
21 May 2014	Auckland	New Zealand	Vector Arena	19,610 / 19,610	$1,195,730
22 May 2014	Auckland	New Zealand	Vector Arena	19,610 / 19,610	$1,195,730

List of North American concerts
Date	City	Country	Venue	Attendance	Revenue
19 June 2014	Vancouver	Canada	Rogers Arena	—N/a	—N/a
20 June 2014	Vancouver	Canada	Rogers Arena	—N/a	—N/a
22 June 2014	Edmonton	Canada	Rexall Place	—N/a	—N/a
23 June 2014	Calgary	Canada	Scotiabank Saddledome	—N/a	—N/a
24 June 2014	Calgary	Canada	Scotiabank Saddledome	—N/a	—N/a
25 June 2014	Winnipeg	Canada	MTS Centre	—N/a	—N/a
28 June 2014	Toronto	Canada	Air Canada Centre	26,824 / 26,824	$2,454,440
29 June 2014	Toronto	Canada	Air Canada Centre	26,824 / 26,824	$2,454,440
30 June 2014	London	Canada	Budweiser Gardens	7,952 / 7,952	$742,892
2 July 2014	Ottawa	Canada	Canadian Tire Centre	—N/a	—N/a
4 July 2014	Montreal	Canada	Bell Centre	25,385 / 25,385	$2,264,150
5 July 2014	Montreal	Canada	Bell Centre	25,385 / 25,385	$2,264,150
7 July 2014	New York City	United States	Madison Square Garden	23,850 / 23,850	$2,859,788
8 July 2014	New York City	United States	Madison Square Garden	23,850 / 23,850	$2,859,788
10 July 2014	Uncasville	United States	Mohegan Sun Arena	6,049 / 6,774	$572,063
11 July 2014	Manchester	United States	SNHU Arena	6,622 / 6,622	$522,856
12 July 2014	Atlantic City	United States	Boardwalk Hall	9,882 / 10,400	$685,300
25 July 2014	Grand Rapids	United States	Van Andel Arena	9,228 / 9,800	$682,025
26 July 2014	Columbus	United States	Schottenstein Center	8,352 / 8,352	$698,602
27 July 2014	Milwaukee	United States	BMO Harris Bradley Center	6,911 / 6,911	$567,252
29 July 2014	Cincinnati	United States	U.S. Bank Arena	6,879 / 6,879	$564,797
30 July 2014	Memphis	United States	FedExForum	6,236 / 6,236	$449,300
1 August 2014 (Note: The 1 August 2014 concert at BOK Center in Tulsa was originally scheduled to take place on 16 October 2013, but was rescheduled due to scheduling conflicts.)	Tulsa	United States	BOK Center	7,748 / 7,748	$665,203
2 August 2014	Oklahoma City	United States	Chesapeake Energy Arena	8,376 / 8,376	$669,024
3 August 2014	Austin	United States	Frank Erwin Center	9,139 / 9,139	$693,611

List of Latin American concerts
Date	City	Country	Venue	Attendance	Revenue
6 August 2014	Monterrey	Mexico	Arena Monterrey	—N/a	—N/a
8 August 2014	Mexico City	Mexico	Mexico City Arena	—N/a	—N/a
9 August 2014	Mexico City	Mexico	Mexico City Arena	—N/a	—N/a
9 September 2014	Santiago	Chile	Movistar Arena	—N/a	—N/a
10 September 2014	Santiago	Chile	Movistar Arena	—N/a	—N/a
13 September 2014	Buenos Aires	Argentina	Estadio G.E.B.A.	8,745 / 11,000	$824,070
17 September 2014	Rio de Janeiro	Brazil	HSBC Arena	8,241 / 9,590	$845,439
19 September 2014	São Paulo	Brazil	Ibirapuera Arena	19,439 / 19,439	$2,985,680
20 September 2014	São Paulo	Brazil	Ibirapuera Arena	19,439 / 19,439	$2,985,680
21 September 2014	São Paulo	Brazil	Ibirapuera Arena	19,439 / 19,439	$2,985,680

List of European concerts
Date	City	Country	Venue	Attendance	Revenue
2 November 2014	Budapest	Hungary	László Papp Arena	—N/a	—N/a
4 November 2014	Kraków	Poland	Kraków Arena	—N/a	—N/a
5 November 2014	Vienna	Austria	Wiener Stadthalle	—N/a	—N/a
6 November 2014	Ljubljana	Slovenia	Arena Stožice	—N/a	—N/a
8 November 2014	Bologna	Italy	Unipol Arena	—N/a	—N/a
10 November 2014	Stuttgart	Germany	Schleyerhalle	—N/a	—N/a
11 November 2014	Frankfurt	Germany	Festhalle	—N/a	—N/a
12 November 2014	Munich	Germany	Olympiahalle	—N/a	—N/a
14 November 2014	Cologne	Germany	Lanxess Arena	—N/a	—N/a
15 November 2014	Rotterdam	Netherlands	Rotterdam Ahoy	—N/a	—N/a
2 December 2014	Birmingham	England	Barclaycard Arena	—N/a	—N/a
3 December 2014	Birmingham	England	Barclaycard Arena	—N/a	—N/a
5 December 2014	Newcastle	England	Metro Radio Arena	—N/a	—N/a
6 December 2014	Newcastle	England	Metro Radio Arena	—N/a	—N/a
8 December 2014	Leeds	England	First Direct Arena	—N/a	—N/a
9 December 2014	Leeds	England	First Direct Arena	—N/a	—N/a
11 December 2014	Belfast	Northern Ireland	Odyssey Arena	23,485 / 23,485	$3,199,700
12 December 2014	Belfast	Northern Ireland	Odyssey Arena	23,485 / 23,485	$3,199,700
13 December 2014	Belfast	Northern Ireland	Odyssey Arena	23,485 / 23,485	$3,199,700
15 December 2014	London	England	The O_{2} Arena	30,533 / 30,533	$3,505,440
16 December 2014	London	England	The O_{2} Arena	30,533 / 30,533	$3,505,440

=== 2015 ===
List of Asian concerts
Date	City	Country	Venue	Attendance	Revenue
13 January 2015	Shanghai	China	Mercedes-Benz Arena	—N/a	—N/a
16 January 2015	Marina Bay	Singapore	Marina Bay Sands	—N/a	—N/a
17 January 2015	Marina Bay	Singapore	Marina Bay Sands	—N/a	—N/a
21 January 2015	Chek Lap Kok	Hong Kong	AsiaWorld Expo Hall 10	—N/a	—N/a
24 January 2015	Bangkok	Thailand	Impact Arena	—N/a	—N/a
27 January 2015	Kuala Lumpur	Malaysia	Putra Indoor Stadium	—N/a	—N/a
29 January 2015	Jakarta	Indonesia	Indonesia Convention Exhibition	—N/a	—N/a
31 January 2015	Pasay	Philippines	Mall of Asia Arena	—N/a	—N/a
4 February 2015	Seoul	South Korea	Jamsil Arena	—N/a	—N/a
6 February 2015	Tokyo	Japan	Nippon Budokan	—N/a	—N/a
12 March 2015	Dubai	United Arab Emirates	Dubai International Cricket Stadium	29,576 / 30,000	$3,451,268
13 March 2015	Dubai	United Arab Emirates	Dubai International Cricket Stadium	29,576 / 30,000	$3,451,268

List of African concerts
Date	City	Country	Venue	Attendance	Revenue
17 March 2015	Durban	South Africa	Moses Mabhida Stadium	16,667 / 16,667	$615,311
19 March 2015	Cape Town	South Africa	Cape Town Stadium	22,060 / 22,060	$980,263
21 March 2015	Johannesburg	South Africa	Coca-Cola Dome	24,952 / 24,952	$1,269,390
22 March 2015	Johannesburg	South Africa	Coca-Cola Dome	24,952 / 24,952	$1,269,390
