= Oscar Gundlach-Pedersen =

Danish architect

- Born: 17 May 1886; Odense, Denmark
- Died: 4 October 1960 (aged 74); Kongens Lyngby, Denmark
- Occupation: Architect

Oscar Gundlach-Pedersen (17 May 1886 – 4 October 1960) was a Danish architect. His work was part of the architecture event in the art competition at the 1924 Summer Olympics.
