= Better Day (album) =

Studio album by Dolly Parton
- Released: June 28, 2011
- Recorded: 2010–2011
- Studios: Blackbird (Nashville, Tennessee); Kent Wells Production (Nashville, Tennessee); Sound Kitchen (Franklin)
- Genre: Country
- Length: 42:22
- Labels: Dolly; Warner Music Nashville
- Producers: Dolly Parton; Kent Wells

Dolly Parton chronology
Sha-Kon-O-Hey! Land of Blue Smoke (2009)	Better Day (2011)	Joyful Noise (2012)

Singles from Better Day
- 1. "Together You and I" Released: May 23, 2011; 2. "The Sacrifice" Released: October 11, 2011

Better Day is the forty-third solo studio album by American singer-songwriter Dolly Parton. It was released on June 28, 2011, by Dolly Records and Warner Music Nashville. The album was produced by Parton and Kent Wells. To promote the album, Parton embarked on her Better Day World Tour. With 49 shows, the tour visited North America, Europe, and Australia.

== Background ==
Parton first mentioned plans for a new album in October 2010 during an interview with The Huntsville Times. She said she was currently working on the album which will "have some uplifting gospel flavor and some country." She went on to say that she plans to tour "in the fall and winter" in Europe and Australia. It was announced in January 2011 that the album's title would be Better Day.

== Content ==
Better Day contains entirely original material, her first since Hungry Again. However, only six of the album's twelve tracks are exclusively new. Four of the songs on Better Day, "I Just Might", "Shine Like the Sun", "Get Out and Stay Out" and "Let Love Grow" are Parton's personally recorded versions of songs she wrote for the Broadway adaptation of her 1980 movie 9 to 5. "Holding Everything" was previously written for and recorded by Randy Owen on his debut album, One on One.

In an interview with Billboard, it was noted that the songs on the album are thematically linked, in that they are all inspirational. Parton replied with, "We actually did demo a lot of songs for this and it seemed that with everything being so doomsday-terrorists and bad weather and unemployment-we need a little sunshine. I wanted to do something people would want to hear." Parton told The National Post that the album inspired in part by such disparate world problems as the Japanese tsunami, the ongoing conflict in the Middle East and America's economic crisis". Parton added, "I don't write just to relieve my own anxieties, I write for the people who can't express themselves." She concluded by saying, "I can't save the world, but I might be able to save someone today if I can put them in a better mood. The music's designed to be like a ray of sunshine for all those folks in the dark."

== Release and promotion ==
The first single from the album, "Together You and I," was premiered on The Ellen DeGeneres Show on May 27, 2011. Parton has already begun promotion of the tour and album, including across the BBC and ITV in the United Kingdom in April 2011. The album was released on CD, vinyl and digital download.

The album's lead single, "Together You and I" was released on May 23, 2011 to digital retailer, iTunes. A video for the single was filmed, and was originally scheduled to debut on May 28. However, for unknown reasons, the video was delayed and later debuted on July 4 on country music video station, CMT. The video was directed by acclaimed CMT Music Awards "Video Director of the Year", Trey Fanjoy. "The Sacrifice" was released as the album's second and final single, and a music video was created using live footage from Parton's Better Day World Tour.

== Critical reception ==
Professional ratings
Aggregate scores
Source	Rating
Metacritic	(72/100)
Review scores
Source	Rating
AllMusic	4/5 stars
Billboard	(favorable)
Entertainment Weekly	A−
Los Angeles Times	3.5/4 stars
The New York Times	(favorable)
Now Magazine	2/5 stars
Paste Magazine	7.5/10 stars
USA Today	3/4 stars
The Washington Post	(mixed)

Better Day has received positive reviews from most music critics. At Metacritic, which assigns a normalized rating out of 100 to reviews from mainstream critics, the album received an average score of 72, based on 19 reviews, which indicates "generally favorable reviews". Mikael Wood of the Los Angeles Times stated, "Stylistically, “Better Day” lands somewhere between Parton's recent bluegrass albums and 2008's “Backwoods Barbie”", and praised of Parton, "[her] irrepressible personality is the star attraction, and on “Better Day” it shines.". Elysa Gardner of USA Today gave Better Day three out of four stars, and wrote "this age-defying country girl, with her resilient soprano and infectious pluck, seems incapable of a truly false note." Entertainment Weekly's Ken Tucker wrote, "In the midst of hard economic times, the positive anthems that fill Better Day [...] come off as brilliant strategy, with some equally brilliant vocal performances." Tucker added to this, with his review for NPR's Fresh Air, stating, "There's a sincere and earnest quality to this music that enables it to stand apart from so much of the trumped-up emotionalism and cheesy irony of the pop-music world all around it." In a favorable review, Billboard's Phil Gallo exclaimed, "The album's dozen story songs [..] are filled with uplifting sentiment and words of encouragement set against a variety of backdrops, most of them deeply rooted in country traditions rather than acquiescing to radio demands", and claimed that the album's mid-tempo songs, "leap out and beg to be played on the radio."

The New York Times writer Nate Chinen offered praise for Parton's "almost ageless" vocals. Holly Gleason of Paste Magazine stated that Parton, "juxtaposes superstardom with her down-home comfort zone" and continued that the album is a "pop-country gem that empowers as it punches country radio’s clichés with a freshness". AllMusic's Steve Leggett commended that Better Day is, "an energetic, spirited, and hopeful outing that rocks and soars with enough musical sunshine to light up even the grayest day" and wrote that Parton, "has never sounded fresher or more spirited [...] she shows she still knows how to write a timeless song."

The Washington Post's Allison Stewart stated that Better Day is a "restless jumble of styles weighted toward mainstream country", and that the album "is only as great as it needs to be". Carla Gillis of NOW panned the album's "eye-rolling Dollyisms", but complimented that Parton's vocals were "as strong, clear and distinct as ever."

== Commercial performance ==
Better Day debuted at number 51 on the Billboard 200 albums chart with first week sales of 17,500. The album also debuted at number 11 on the Billboard Top Country Albums chart. In the UK, the album was released on August 29, 2011 and debuted at number 9 on the UK Album Charts, becoming Parton's highest charting studio album in that country as well as becoming a number 1 on the UK Country Albums Chart.

== Track listing ==
All tracks are written by Dolly Parton, except where noted.

No.	Title	Writer(s)	Length
1.	"In the Meantime"		4:04
2.	"Just Leaving"		3:00
3.	"Somebody's Missing You"		3:43
4.	"Together You and I"		3:56
5.	"Country Is as Country Does"	Parton, Mac Davis	3:20
6.	"Holding Everything" (with Kent Wells)		3:36
7.	"The Sacrifice"		3:26
8.	"I Just Might"		3:57
9.	"Better Day"		3:22
10.	"Shine Like the Sun"		3:12
11.	"Get Out and Stay Out"		3:05
12.	"Let Love Grow"		3:41
Total length:			42:22

== Personnel ==
Adapted from the album liner notes.

- Kii Arens – Art Direction
- Mike Brignardello – Bass guitar
- Matt Coles – Assistant
- Jamie Dailey – Background Vocals
- Christian Davis – Background Vocals
- Michael Davis – Hammond B3 Organ, Synthesizer
- Richard Dennison – Background Vocals
- Kyle Dickinson – Assistant
- Allen Ditto – Assistant
- Peter Dokus – Photo Assistance
- Lloyd Green – Steel Guitar
- Andy Hall – Dobro
- Vicki Hampton – Background Vocals
- Emmylou Harris – Background Vocals on track 3
- Aubrey Haynie – Fiddle, Mandolin
- Steve Hinson – Steel Guitar, Slide Guitar
- Paul Hollowell – Hammond B3 Organ, Keyboards, piano
- Becky Isaacs – Background Vocals
- Sonya Isaacs – Background Vocals
- Randy Kohrs – Dobro
- Alison Krauss – Background Vocals on track 3
- Rob McNelley – Electric guitar
- Jerry McPherson – Electric guitar
- Steve Mackey – Bass guitar, Upright Bass
- Stephen Marcussen – Mastering
- Brent Mason – Electric guitar
- Jimmy Mattingly – Fiddle, Mandolin
- Patrick Murphy – Engineering, Mixing
- Jennifer O'Brien – Background Vocals
- Richie Owens – Harmonica
- Dolly Parton – Composer, Executive Producer, Lead Vocals, Background Vocals
- Cheryl Riddle – Hair Stylist
- Hargus "Pig" Robbins – Piano
- Ben Schmitt – Assistant
- Tony Smith – Engineer
- Fran Strine – Photography
- Steve Summers – Costume Design
- Bryan Sutton – Acoustic Guitar
- Dave Talbot – Banjo
- Steve Turner – Drums, Percussion
- Darrin Vincent – Background Vocals
- Biff Watson – Acoustic Guitar
- Kent Wells – Acoustic Guitar, Electric guitar, Producer, Background Vocals
- Stewart Whitmore – Digital Editing

== Charts ==
Chart (2011)	Peak position
Australian Country Albums (ARIA)	1
Australian Albums Chart	29
Irish Albums Chart	68
Scottish Albums Chart	6
UK Albums Chart	9
UK Country Albums Chart	1
UK Download Albums Chart	18
U.S. Billboard 200	51
U.S. Billboard Top Country Albums	11

== Certifications ==
Region	Certification	Certified units/sales
United Kingdom (BPI)	Silver	60,000^{‡}
^{‡} Sales+streaming figures based on certification alone.

== Release history ==
Country	Date	Label	Format
Canada	June 28, 2011	Dolly; Warner Music Nashville	CD; digital download
United States	June 28, 2011	Dolly; Warner Music Nashville	CD; digital download
Canada	August 16, 2011	Dolly; Warner Music Nashville	LP
United States	August 16, 2011	Dolly; Warner Music Nashville	LP
Australia	August 26, 2011	Dolly; Universal Music TV	CD; digital download
Ireland	August 29, 2011	Dolly; Sony Music	CD; digital download
United Kingdom	August 29, 2011	Dolly; Sony Music	CD; digital download
