= Together You and I =

Single by Dolly Parton

from the album Better Day
- Released: May 23, 2011
- Recorded: 2011
- Genre: Country pop
- Length: 3:56
- Label: Dolly Records
- Songwriter: Dolly Parton

Dolly Parton singles chronology
"Comin' Home for Christmas" (2009)	"Together You and I" (2011)	"The Sacrifice" (2011)

"Together You and I" is a song by American singer-songwriter Dolly Parton. The song was initially by Porter Wagoner on his 1972 album Ballads of Love before being re-recorded as a duet with Parton on the 1974 album Porter 'n' Dolly.

An updated solo recording was released as the lead single from Parton's 2011 album, Better Day, on May 23, 2011. It impacted country radio on May 27. It peaked at number 67 on the UK Singles Chart.

== Music video ==
A video for the single was filmed, and was originally scheduled to debut on May 28. However, for unknown reasons, the video was delayed and later debuted on July 4 on country music video station, CMT. The video was directed by Trey Fanjoy.

== Live performances ==
Dolly Parton performed her song on September 10, 2011 on the Launch Night for the ninth series of Strictly Come Dancing. She also performed the song on American television talk show The Ellen DeGeneres Show on May 27, 2011 and on NBC's The Tonight Show with Jay Leno.

== Chart performance ==
The song reached No. 67 in the UK Singles Chart, becoming her highest chart entry since "9 to 5" in 1981.

Chart (2011)	Peak position
UK Singles (The Official Charts Company)	67

== Release history ==
Region	Date	Label	Format
United States	23 May 2011	Dolly Records	Digital download
